= List of Teletriumph Award winners =

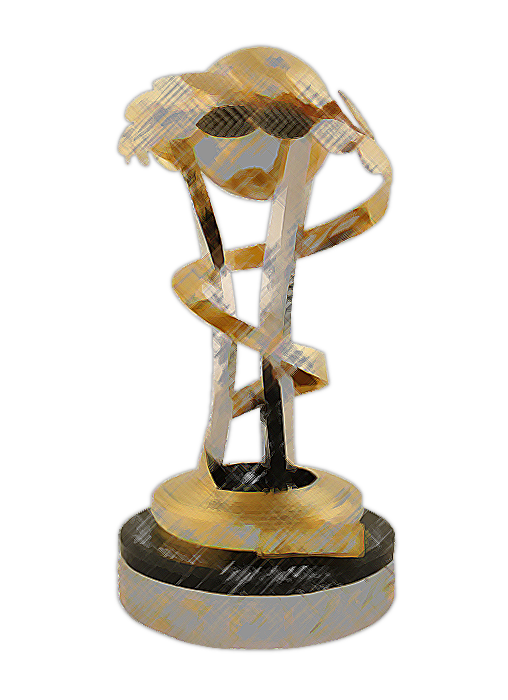
Teletriumph Award

The Teletriumph Awards or Teletriumphs (Ukrainian: Телетріумф) are the only national television awards of Ukraine, awarded by the National Council of Television and Radio Broadcasting of Ukraine, the Television Industry Committee (ITK), and the Ukrainian Television Academy. The awards adopted the name "Triumph," after the Ancient Roman Latin word meaning an outstanding success, or a celebration on the occasion of a victory. Every year since the creation of the awards, the total number of submissions for consideration, the total number of nominations, and the total number of awards has changed.

In 2014, when Russia invaded Crimea, Teletriumph 2014 was cancelled. Teletriumph 2017 was also cancelled due to disagreements within the Ukrainian television industry, no awards were given while the conference underwent major reforms. The awards were again cancelled in 2019, due to collaborative disagreements between the ceremony and awards organizers. However, with the rise of COVID-19 in 2020, most awards ceremonies in Ukraine were cancelled, and the Russians invaded shortly thereafter, meaning that the Teletriumphs have not been awarded since 2018.

== 2001 ==
Category	Nominee	Program	Channel / Organization	Result
Information program – national issues		Reporter	New Channel	Winner
Local news (daily regional issues)		Theme of the Day	TVA (Chernivtsi)	Winner
TV show		Rise	New Channel	Winner
Humorous program		Gentlemen Show	INTER	Winner
Music on television		Melorama	INTER	Winner
Program for children		Visiting the Domy	TK "Privat-TV" ("Ditles", Kharkiv)	Winner
Popular science program		Animal Life	INTER	Winner
Host of an information program	Alla Grigorievna Mazur	TSN	1+1	Winner
Reporter	Artem Valerievich Shevchenko	Day of the Seventh, Roma	ICTV	Winner
Sports commentator / host of sports program	Evgeny Sergeevich Zinchenko	TSN: Sport	1+1	Winner
Screenwriters of TV program	Dmitry Georgievich Dzhagirov, Valery Evgenievich Zaitsev	Great Racing: Hamlet	1+1	Winner
TV director	Anatoliy Mykolayovych Matesko	Birthday of Burzhuy	1+1	Winner
TV program operator	Oleg Orlyankin	Ukiend	INTER	Winner
TV channel design			1+1	Winner

== 2002 ==
Category	Nominee	Program	Channel	Result
Economic program		Business-coffee	PLUSPLUS and Era TV, First National	Winner
Program on Culture		Impreza	International Media – STB	Winner
Program for children	Masks (comedy group)	Lessons of Aunt Owl: Alphabet – Malyshka	TRC Alice	Winner
Popular science program		Steem Stories. Eracury Peace in the Deadlock	Dmitry Kharitonov Studio "21st vek", 1+1	Winner
Publicistic program		N-th Kilometer. Afghanistan	INTER	Winner
TV channel design			1+1	Winner
Sports TV journalist	Serhiy Polkhovsky	ProSport	1+1	Winner
TV program operator	Alexey Stepanov	Evenings on a Farm Near Dikanka	Melorama, INTER	Winner
Screenwriter of a TV program	Sergey Kosarev	On the Very Dele	TRC Telefactory, ICTV	Winner
TV director	Semen Horov	Evenings on a Farm Near Dikanka	Melorama, INTER	Winner
Music on television		M-files	TeleOne, ICTV	Winner
Humorous program		Hidden Camera	About TV, 1+1	Winner
Presenter of an information program	Elena Frolyak	Facts	Telefactory, ICTV	Winner
TV show		Rise	New Channel	Winner
Reporter	Andrey Tsaplienko	N-th Kilometer. Afghanistan	INTER	Winner
Information program		Facts	Telefactory, ICTV	Winner
Regional Awards
Local news (Regional)		Alex-inform	TRC Alex	Winner
TV show (Regional)		In Search of Treasures	Channel 34	Winner
Scientific and popular program (Regional)		I know	TVA	Winner
Music on television (Regional)		Resheto — Singer Rosava	TET	Winner
Humorous program on (Regional)	Masks (comedy group)	Masks in the Casino	TRC Alice	Winner

== 2003 ==
Category	Nominee	Program	Channel / Organization	Result
Special contribution to Ukrainian television	Oleksandr Zinchenko			
Special contribution to Ukrainian television	Ivan Maschchenko			
Information program		Facts	ICTV	Winner
Talk show		Without Taboo with Olga Gerasimyuk	1+1	Winner
TV gameshow		Karaoke on the Maidan	Prime Time Production	Winner
Entertainment program		Gallop in Europe	ICTV	Winner
Popular science program		I See the Earth! (Past of Ukraine)	National Television Company of Ukraine	Winner
Humorous program	Masks (comedy group)	Masks: The Iskusheniya of Dr. Faust from Love Tragoulner		Winner
Music on television		Tvium Format - Skryabin	M1	Winner
Program on culture		Impreza	STB	Winner
Economic program		Windows-Business	STB	Winner
Publicistic program		Spets Reporter	New Channel	Winner
Program for children		Intellect Show: LG-Eureka	INTER	Winner
Television design		Autumn	ICTV	Winner
Host of an information program	Alla Grigorievna Mazur	Main issue: Dubrovka, Moscow	1+1	Winner
Reporter	Andrey Yurievich Tsaplienko	In the Line of Fire	INTER	Winner
Sports commentator / host of sports program	Lidia Vasylivna Taran	Sport: Reporter	New Channel	Winner
Screenwriter	Sergey Alekseevich Dolbilov	Brothers by Blood	1+1	Winner
Director	Sergey Anatolyevich Bukovsky		Kyiv TV	Winner
Operator (Cinematographer)	Alexey Stepanov	Zolushka	INTER	Winner
Host of an entertainment program	Igor Pelykh	Gallop in Europe	ICTV	Winner

== 2004 ==
Category	Nominee	Program	Channel	Result
Special contribution to Ukrainian television	Tatiana Tsymbal			
Information program		Detailed with Dmitry Kiselyov	ICTV	Winner
Game program		Chance	INTER	Winner
Children's program		The Cleverest	1+1	Winner
Talk show		I Think So	1+1	Winner
Entertainment program		TVA Format with Okean Elzy	M1	Winner
Film, series		Chasing Two Hares	INTER	Winner
Publicistic program, documentary film		Independence. Ukrainian Version	New Channel	Winner
Host of an information program	Kobernik Ivanna	Facts	ICTV	Winner
Host of an entertainment program	Yuri Gorbunov	One for All	New Channel	Winner
Director	Dolbilov Sergey	Shevchenko. Solo for Andrew	1+1	Winner
Journalist, reporter of a documentary	Andrey Tsaplienko	In the Line of Fire	INTER	Winner
Operator	Kalugin Anton	Gallop on Europe	ICTV	Winner
Best Producer	Pavlov Mikhail	Criminal Stories	ICTV	Winner
Best Producer	Pavlov Mikhail	Group a Million	ICTV	Winner
Best Producer	Pavlov Mikhail	Crown's Dish	ICTV	Winner
Best Producer	Pavlov Mikhail	Detailed with Dmitry Kiselyov	ICTV	Winner
Actor/Actress in a TV series	Bohdan Stupka, Tamara Yatsenko	Tomorrow Will Be Tomorrow	New Channel	Winner
Television design			M1	Winner
Best regional program		Legends of Old Lviv	Lux TRC	Winner

== 2005 ==
Category	Nominee	Program	Channel	Result
Special contribution to Ukrainian television	Yuriy Artemenko			
Special contribution to Ukrainian television	Tatas Brikaylo			
Information program		Time	Channel 5	Winner
Information program		Results	TRC Era	Nominee
Information program		Results with Yuri Toropchynov	TRC Era	Nominee
Children's program	Masks (comedy group)	Lessons of Aunt Owl	Odessa	Winner
Children's program		Soniki / Evening fairy tale	Children's Media Center "Simba", Kyiv	Nominee
Children's program		Tymko and K	Polissia TV, Lutsk	Nominee
Children's program		School of unusual sciences	Zhytomyr State TRC	Nominee
Talk show		Ivanna Naida's Show	TEC "Pilot Studio"	Winner
Talk show		Temnyk	TRC Era	Nominee
Talk show		5 kopecks (5 Cents)	Channel 5	Nominee
Entertainment program		Watch! / Accelerative Way	TET	Winner
Entertainment program		3 x 4. The funniest home video	TEC "Pilot Studio"	Nominee
Entertainment program		Guten Morgen	TeleOne	Nominee
Publicistic program		Closed Zone	Channel 5	Winner
Publicistic program		Ukraine Online	TRC Era	Nominee
Documentary film	Andriy Shevchenko	The Face of Protest	NGO "Republic"	Winner
Documentary film		Mother-Stepmother	Astrah TV, Donetsk	Nominee
Documentary film		Kinomania	Kinostudio Interfilm	Nominee
Presenter of an information program	Andriy Shevchenko		Channel 5	Winner
Presenter of an information program	Ruslan Polishchuk		TRC Era	Nominee
Presenter of an information program	Roman Skrypin		Channel 5	Nominee
Host of an entertainment program	Frolova Vasilisa		TeleOne	Winner
Host of an entertainment program	Natalia Kalantai		TET	Nominee
Director	Ivan Kravchyshyn		Channel 5	Winner
Director	Olena Kanishevska		TET	Nominee
Journalist, reporter	Tseholko Sviatoslav		Channel 5	Winner
Journalist, reporter	Rhodion Prinkevsky		TeleOne	Nominee
Operator	Nazarov Yuri		STV, Sievierodonetsk	Winner
Operator	Dmytro Danchenko		TET	Nominee
Producer	Koval Valentine		TeleOne	Winner
Producer	Oleksandr Askauliuk		TeleOne	Nominee
Television Design		Teledesign of CJSC	TET	Winner
Television Design		Teledesign of JSC ARTK	GLAS, Odessa	Nominee
Television Design		Show Toli	TeleOne	Nominee
Regional program		Kyiv Miniatures	Kyiv TV	Winner
Regional program		Escape from Hell	Aquarium, Vinnitsa	Nominee
Regional program		History of Kharkiv photography	First Capital, Kharkiv	Nominee
Regional program		Wings of Spirituality, Ivan Svitlychny	Luhansk State TRC	Nominee
Regional program		Live Broadcast	A1, Odessa	Nominee
Regional program		Kharkiv: 350th anniversary	City Information Center, Kharkiv	Nominee
Regional program		Fitil in Zhytomyr	Soyuz-TV, Zhytomyr	Nominee
Categories not Awarded
Game Show	Not Awarded	–	–	–
Actor	Not Awarded	–	–	–
Actor	Bohdan Kozak		TRA Lviv	Nominee
Film	Not Awarded	–	–	–
Film		The Field of our Memory	Bridge TV, Lviv	Nominee
Series	Not Awarded	–	–	–
Series		One For All	TRC Emmanuel	Nominee

== 2006 ==
Category	Nominee	Program	Channel	Result
Special contribution to Ukrainian television	Alexander Yukhimovich Rodnyansky			
Information program		TSN: Summary	1+1	Winner
Information program		Facts	ICTV	Nominee
Information program		Time	Channel 5	Nominee
Game show		The Cleverest	1+1 / STS	Winner
Game show		Karaoke on the Maidan	INTER	Nominee
Game show		Game of Patriots	INTER	Nominee
Children's program		I Want to Be a Star	1+1	Winner
Children's program	Masks (comedy group)	Lessons of Aunt Owl: Alphabet – Malyshka		Nominee
Children's program		Silver Orange	Ukraine	Nominee
Children's program		Masks: Creative Union	Odessa	Nominee
Talk show		The Freedom of Speech with Savik Shuster	ICTV	Winner
Talk show		5 Kopiyok (5 Cents)	Channel 5	Nominee
Talk show		I'm Going to You	1+1	Nominee
Entertainment program		Chance	INTER	Winner
Entertainment program		Evening Quarter	INTER	Nominee
Entertainment program	Masks (comedy group)	Masks 2005	Odessa	Nominee
Publicistic program		Closed Zone. Goal: Ukraine (Part 1.2)	NBM TRC	Winner
Publicistic program		Holodomor: Ukraine in the 20th Century	Suspilne	Nominee
Publicistic program		I Think So	1+1	Nominee
Documentary film		Baturin. Lost Capital	New Studio	Winner
Documentary film				Nominee
Documentary film				Nominee
TV movie		Mazepa: Love, Greatness, Betrayal	1+1	Winner
Series		Lesya + Roma	ICTV	Winner
Sports program		Heavy Games	1+1	Winner
Sports program		Scephaestivity of Power on Khortytsia	1+1 / ICTV	Winner
Sports program		Facts: Sport with Igor Miroshnichenko	ICTV	Winner
Presenter of an information program	Vannikova Irina Valerievna	TSN	1+1	Winner
Host of an entertainment program	Ostap Stupka	First Million	1+1	Winner
Director	Daruga Alexander	Lesya + Roma	ICTV	Winner
Reporter	Grubich Konstantin Vladimirovich	TSN: Reports	1+1	Winner
Camera Operator	Azarenka Sergey	Special reports from hot spots	Channel 5	Winner
Producer	Oseledchyk Volodymyr Davydovych	The Cleverest	1+1 / STS	Winner
Television design	Zakharova Olga Ivanovna	New Year’s Carnival	1+1	Winner
Best Regional Program		Extreme Weekend	Independent Television Agency	Winner

== 2007 ==
Category	Nominee	Program	Channel	Result
Special contribution to Ukrainian television	Zhavrotsky Konstantin Romanovich (awarded posthumously)		–	Winner
Journalists' award: Favorite of the Press		Windows-News	STB	Winner
Special Project		Pride of the Country 2006	New Channel	Winner
Special Project		Jobs	Scoops, ICTV	Nominee
Special Project		Children's Search Service	Magnolia TV	Nominee
Host of an entertainment program	Tina Karol, Yuri Gorbunov	Dancing with the Stars	1+1	Winner
Host of an entertainment program	Andriy Domansky	Wedding in 48 hours	New Channel	Nominee
Host of an entertainment program	Andriy Domansky	Let's go	New Channel	Nominee
Host of an entertainment program	Andriy Domansky	The Lord of the Mountain	New Channel	Nominee
Host of an entertainment program	Volodymyr Zelenskyy	Evening Quarter	INTER	Nominee
Host of an information program	Elena Frolyak	Facts	ICTV	Winner
Host of an information program	Anna Homonai		INTER	Nominee
Host of an information program	Lidiia Anatoliivna Taran	Time	Channel 5	Nominee
Reporter	Andrey Tsaplienko	Details	INTER	Winner
Reporter	Victor Soroka	Facts of the Week with Oksana Sokolova	ICTV	Winner
Reporter	Mikhail Shamanov	Reporter	New Channel	Nominee
Television channel design			1+1	Winner
Children's program		Silver Orange	Ukraine	Winner
Children's program		Evening Tale	First National	Nominee
Entertainment program		Dancing with the Stars	1+1	Winner
Entertainment program		Morgen Morgen Morgen Morgen Morgen!	M1	Nominee
Entertainment program		Evening Quarter	INTER	Nominee
Music program		Chance	INTER	Winner
Music program		VovaZIL'Vov	M1	Nominee
Music program		Show Mania	New Channel	Nominee
Sports program		Goal!	New Channel	Winner
Sports program		The 3rd Half	ICTV	Nominee
Sports program		Footballstrasse	1+1	Nominee
Documentary (series)		War and Peace	INTER	Winner
Documentary (series)		Dissidents	1+1	Nominee
Documentary (series)		Documentary Detective, Katka's Tears	STB	Nominee
Educational, cognitive, cultural, social program		Document: Corporate on Blood	1+1	Winner
Educational, cognitive, cultural, social program		The Key Moment	INTER	Nominee
Educational, cognitive, cultural, social program		Ukrainian show business: how it was	M1	Nominee
Socio-political program		The Freedom of Speech	ICTV	Winner
Socio-political program				Nominee
Socio-political program				Nominee
Information program (news)		Windows-News	STB	Winner
Information program (news)		TSN	1+1	Nominee
Information program (news)		Facts	ICTV	Nominee
Information and entertainment program		Black on White	1+1	Winner
Information and entertainment program		The Fleet	ICTV	Nominee
Information and entertainment program		Watch!	TET	Nominee
Weekly Analysis Program		Facts of the Week with Oksana Sokolova	ICTV	Winner
Weekly Analysis Program		Details of the Week	INTER	Nominee
Local news		Results	Lux TRC	Winner
Local news		Objective: Sunday	Simon, Kharkiv	Nominee
Categories Not Awarded
Feature film (series)	Not awarded		–	–
Feature film (series)		The Thirst for Extreme	1+1	Nominee
Feature film (series)		Don't go to Santa Claus	ICTV	Nominee
Regional transmission	Not awarded		–	–
Regional transmission		Big Journey	NTA, Lviv	Nominee
Regional transmission		Kneippes of the Old City	Lux TRC, Lviv	Nominee

== 2008 ==
Category	Nominee	Program	Channel	Result
Favorite of the Press (Journalists’ Award)		Behind the Windows	STB	Winner
Presenter of an information program	Lidiia Anatoliivna Taran		Channel 5	Winner
Presenter of an information program	Nataliia Moseichuk	TSN	1+1	Nominee
Presenter of an information program	Anna Homonai	Details	INTER	Nominee
Host of an entertainment program	Tina Karol, Yuri Gorbunov	Dancing with the Stars-3: Champions League	1+1	Winner
Host of an entertainment program	Masha Efrosynina	Fashionable Sentence	INTER	Nominee
Host of an entertainment program	Bogdan Benyuk	Eniki-Beniki	STB / Pilot Studio	Nominee
Reporter	Svitlana Usenko	There Are No Children Without Parents	1+1	Winner
Reporter	Dmytro Drabyk		1+1	Nominee
Reporter	Kostiantyn Hrubych	Quality Mark	INTER	Nominee
Debut	Serhiy Rakhmanin	Duel	Ukraine	Winner
Debut	Oksana Karavanska	Fashionable Sentence	INTER	Nominee
Debut	Tetiana Danylenko		Channel 5	Nominee
Documentary (series)		The Finger of Cruelty (The Genre of Cruelty)	INTER	Winner
Documentary (series)		Climbing	1+1	Nominee
Documentary (series)		Ukrainian Independence. Sixth convocation	Channel 5	Nominee
Revived Story		TSN: Lesya Sakada-Ostrovskaya, stories about found Ukrainian relics in Sweden	1+1	Winner
Revived Story		The Tale of the Baptism of Rus	Star Media	Nominee
Revived Story		True history of Major Vikhria	INTER	Nominee
Special project		Great Ukrainians	INTER	Winner
Special project		Freedom with Savik Shuster	INTER	Nominee
Special project		Quality Mark	INTER	Nominee
Special project		The Simpsons (Ukrainian duplication)	Pilot Studio	Nominee
Local news		Our Reporter	Lux TRC	Winner
Local news		Children with Cancer	Lux TRC	Nominee
Local news		The Luxury Shopping Mall	Lux TRC	Nominee
Children's program		The Cleverest	1+1	Winner
Children's program		Eniki-Beniki	STB / Pilot Studio	Nominee
Entertainment program		Dancing with the Stars-3: Champions League	1+1	Winner
Entertainment program		Evening Quarter	INTER	Nominee
Musical program		Karaoke on the Maidan	1+1	Winner
Musical program		Very New Year's cinema, or Night in the Museum	INTER	Nominee
Sports program		UEFA Champions League Journal: On the League	1+1	Winner
Sports program		Football Weekend	Ukraine	Nominee
Educational, cultural, social transmission		Parallel World	Pilot Studio	Winner
Educational, cultural, social transmission		Oleksandr Dovzhenko, Between Caesar and God	Book.UA	Nominee
Socio-political (analytical) transmission		Details of the Week	INTER	Winner
Socio-political (analytical) transmission		Duel	Ukraine	Nominee
Socio-political (analytical) transmission		Time: Summary of the Week	Channel 5	Nominee
Information program (news)		TSN	1+1	Winner
Information program (news)		Details	INTER	Nominee
Information program (news)		News 24	Lux TRC / Channel 24	Nominee
TV channel design			1+1	Winner
TV channel design		Big Ukrainians	INTER	Nominee
TV channel design		M1	TeleOne	Nominee
Categories Not Awarded
Special contribution to Ukrainian television	Not awarded	–	–	–
Feature film (series)	Not awarded	–	–	–
Feature film (series)		Unterrestant	STB / Old Media	Nominee
Feature film (series)		Enchanted Love	INTER	Nominee
Regional program	Not awarded		–	–
Regional program		My hero Volodymyr Etush	Class TRC, Donetsk	Nominee
Regional program		Crimean ark	Symon TRC, Kharkiv	Nominee

== 2009 ==
Category	Nominee	Program	Channel	Result
Special contribution to Ukrainian television	Igor Pelykh			
Reporter	Natalia Sokolenko	Windows-News	STB	Winner
Reporter	Jean Novoseltsev	Gess of the uniform	TSN, 1+1	Nominee
Reporter	Tetiana Prudnikova	Facts	ICTV	Nominee
Daily Information Program		Windows-News	STB	Winner
Daily Information Program		TSN	1+1	Nominee
Daily Information Program		Facts	ICTV	Nominee
Leader / presenter of an information program	Sergey Yurievich Popov	Windows-News	STB	Winner
Leader / presenter of an information program	Nataliia Moseichuk	TSN	1+1	Nominee
Leader / presenter of an information program	Savik Shuster		Ukraine	Nominee
Final information and analytical program		Facts of the week with Oksana Sokolova	ICTV	Winner
Final information and analytical program		Eugene Kiselev. Up	TVi	Nominee
Final information and analytical program		TSN: Week	1+1	Nominee
Tok-show		The Freedom of Speech	ICTV	Winner
Tok-show		Shuster Live, Friday	Ukraine	Nominee
Tok-show		I think so with Anna Bezulyk	Channel 5	Nominee
Musical program		Shamuania	New Channel	Winner
Musical program		Folk-music	NTU	Nominee
Musical program		Ukraine, get up!	INTER	Nominee
Sports transmission		Football Weekend	Ukraine	Winner
Sports transmission		Prosport	1+1	Nominee
Sports transmission		Cycle of programs UEFA Champions League of the 2008/2009 season	Surface Sport-TV	Nominee
Best presenter of an entertainment program	Andrey Domansky	Who's Against Blondes?	New Channel	Winner
Best presenter of an entertainment program	Yuri Gorbunov	Dance for you - 2	1+1	Nominee
Best presenter of an entertainment program	Oksana Marchenko	Ukraine's Got Talent	STB	Nominee
Entertainment program		Ukraine's Got Talent	STB	Winner
Entertainment program		Evening Quarter	INTER	Nominee
Entertainment program		Who's Against Blondes?	New Channel	Nominee
Telefilm		Dear Children	ICTV	Winner
Telefilm		Ukrainian Dream	NTU	Nominee
Telefilm		I want a child	INTER	Nominee
TV series		Milkmaid from Khatsapivka - 2: Call of fate	New Studio	Winner
TV series		Territory of Beauty	INTER	Nominee
Actor, actress of a television film/series	Vitalii Linetskyi	Dear Children	ICTV	Winner
Actor, actress of a television film/series	Victor Gladush	Devils of Two	INTER	Nominee
Actor, actress of a television film/series	Olga Sumskaya	Territory of Beauty	INTER	Nominee
Documentary Film/Series		Faina. War of the Special Services	ICTV	Winner
Documentary Film/Series		Vladimir Ivasyuk. Ideal murder	INTER	Nominee
Documentary Film/Series		War and Peace. Evacuation	INTER	Nominee
Children's program		The Cleverest	INTER	Winner
Children's program		Eniki-Beniki	Pilot Studio	Nominee
Children's program		Silver Orange	Ukraine	Nominee
Educational, cognitive, cultural, social transfer		Pride of the Country	New Channel	Winner
Educational, cognitive, cultural, social transfer		Good News	ICTV	Nominee
Educational, cognitive, cultural, social transfer		Behind the Windows	STB	Nominee
Best Ukrainian translation	(T/S) Translation team	House, M.D.	STB	Winner
Best Ukrainian translation	Translation team	The Simpsons	Pilot Studio	Nominee
Best Ukrainian translation	Translation team	Harry Potter and the Goblet of Fire	New Channel	Nominee
Best design of a work or channel		Identifiers: tennis, bugs, bow, soap bubbles, aspen, satter-fireworks, business center	New Channel	Winner
Best design of a work or channel		Spring-Summer 2009 season	1+1	Nominee
Best design of a work or channel			STB	Nominee
Best promotional campaign of a work or channel		Ukraine's Got Talent	STB	Winner
Best promotional campaign of a work or channel		Announcement of screening of Taxi-2 and Taxi-3	New Channel	Nominee
Best promotional campaign of a work or channel		Announcement of show Star Factory-2	New Channel	Nominee
Best promotional campaign of a work or channel		Announcement of final concert of Star Factory-2	New Channel	Nominee
Best promotional campaign of a work or channel		Dance for you 2. Children's dreams	1+1	Nominee
Regional information program		Day City	CiTi TV	Winner
Regional information program		Kyiv Time	Channel 5	Nominee
Regional program		Mine named after Ordzhonikidze. Three births	KP Rudana	Nominee
Scenario of a TV work		Special Investigation. Complete Pastorization	ICTV	Winner
Scenario of a TV work		Key Moment: Special Edition	Key Moment	Nominee
Scenario of a TV work		Ukrainians Affigen	Ledokol Bakhmatov Group	Nominee
Director of a TV program, television film/series	Bogdan Korovchenko	Victims of beauty	INTER	Winner
Director of a TV program, television film/series	Mykhailo Komarovsky	Dance for you 2	1+1	Nominee
Director of a TV program, television film/series	Serhiy Musienko	Facts of the Week, Maximum in Ukraine	ICTV	Nominee
Operator of TV program, television film/series	Sergey Solovyov	The Freedom of Speech	ICTV	Winner
Operator of TV program, television film/series	Sergey Solovyov	Facts	ICTV	Winner
Operator of TV program, television film/series	Sergey Solovyov	Facts of the week with Oksana Sokolova	ICTV	Winner
Operator of TV program, television film/series	Sergey Solovyov	Good News	ICTV	Winner
Operator of TV program, television film/series	Eugene Adamenko	Alo, garage	New Channel	Nominee
Operator of TV program, television film/series	Sergey Rolik (d/f)	Young Guard - Measure counter	INTER	Nominee
Producer of a TV program, television film/series	Galina Pilyutikova, Ruslan Gorodrichny	Ukraine's Got Talent	STB	Winner
Producer of a TV program, television film/series	Victoria Zabulonskaya	Who's Against Blondes?	New Channel	Nominee
Producer of a TV program, television film/series	Oksana Sokolova	Facts of the Week, Maximum in Ukraine	ICTV	Nominee

== 2010 ==
Category	Nominee(s)	Program	Channel	Result
Special Award: For personal contribution to Ukrainian television	Mykola Slobodian			Winner
Special prize of the Teletriumph	Volodymyr Borodyanka			Winner
Socio-political show		National Award "Pride of the Country 2009" Panasivska Oksana Alekseevna	New Channel	Winner
Socio-political show		Great Politics with Yevhen Kiselyov	INTER	Nominee
Socio-political show		The Freedom of Speech with Andriy Kulykov	ICTV	Nominee
Special report		Tango with Dakar	INTER	Winner
Special report		God behind the sinus	1+1	Winner
Special report		Agents of Influence	NTN	Nominee
Special report		Death on the bend	NTN	Nominee
Special report		Maximum in Ukraine	ICTV	Nominee
Information-Analytical program		Facts of the Week with Oksana Sokolova	ICTV	Winner
Information-Analytical program		TSN: Tyzhden	1+1	Nominee
Information-Analytical program		Shuster Live	Ukraine	Nominee
Information program		Windows-News	MMC-STB	Winner
Information program		Details	INTER	Nominee
Information program		Facts	ICTV	Nominee
Host of an information program	Alla Mazur		1+1	Winner
Host of an information program	Nataliia Moseichuk		1+1	Nominee
Host of an information program	Elena Frolyak	Facts	ICTV	Nominee
Host of an entertainment program	Oksana Marchenko	Ukraine's Got Talent	MMC-STB	Winner
Host of an entertainment program	Volodymyr Zelenskyy	Evening Quarter	INTER	Nominee
Host of an entertainment program	Yuri Gorbunov	Superstar	1+1	Nominee
Children's program		The Cleverest	INTER	Winner
Children's program		Marichkin Cinema Hall	1+1	Nominee
Children's program		Zhyvchyk-Starty	New Channel	Nominee
Sports program		The Third Half	ICTV	Winner
Sports program		Sport-reporter	New Channel	Nominee
Sports commentator	Victor Vatsko	2010 FIFA World Cup	ICTV	Winner
Sports commentator	Sergey Panasyuk		Football	Nominee
Sports commentator	Igor Tsyganik		ICTV	Nominee
Reporter	Sergey Andrushko	Windows-News	MMC-STB	Winner
Reporter	Akim Galimov		INTER	Nominee
Reporter	Alexander Ilyin	Maximum in Ukraine: Special report by a judge in Perkopsk	ICTV	Nominee
Historic program		Searching for the Truth Episode 69: The Double Life of Joseph Stalin	MMC-STB	Winner
Historic program		Great War	Star Media	Nominee
Historic program		Legends of Bandit Kyiv	Telestudio, NTN	Nominee
Cognitive program. Lifestyle		Dr. Komarovsky's School	INTER	Winner
Cognitive program. Lifestyle		Quality Mark	INTER	Nominee
Cognitive program. Lifestyle		World Life with Kateryna Osadcha	1+1	Nominee
Humorous program		Great Difference in Ukrainian	ICTV	Winner
Humorous program		Molded in Ukraine	INTER	Nominee
Humorous program		Faina Ukraine	New Channel	Nominee
TV game		BOOM - Battle of Ukrainian Cities	INTER	Winner
TV game		Karaoke on the Maidan	INTER	Nominee
TV game		Who's Against Blondes?	New Channel	Nominee
Entertainment show		Ukraine's Got Talent	MMC-STB	Winner
Entertainment show		Evening Quarter	INTER	Nominee
Entertainment show		Star Factory 3	New Channel	Nominee
Ukrainian translation		Lilia (Li Lie) Theory	1+1	Winner
Ukrainian translation		Flintstone	Pilot Studio	Nominee
Ukrainian translation		Katyn	National Television Company of Ukraine	Nominee
Director of a television film/series	Andrey Yakovlev	Matchmakers	INTER	Winner
Director of a television film/series	Anatoliy Mateshko	Two	INTER	Nominee
Director of a television film/series	Mark Gorobets	The Basis of the Killing	New Studio	Nominee
TV Director	Yana Fedosenko	Change Woman	1+1	Winner
TV Director	Alan Badoev	Molded in Ukraine	INTER	Nominee
TV Director	Yaroslav Gelias	Call	INTER	Nominee
Screenwriter of a television film/series	Andrey Yakovlev, Mikhail Savin, Andrey Ilkov, Timofey Sayenko, Yuri Mikulenko, Yuri Gorbunov, Alexey Zhelenko	Matchmakers	INTER	Winner
Screenwriter of a television film/series	Igor Ter-Karapetov	Heaven in Fire	Star Media	Nominee
Screenwriter of a television film/series	Igor Shvetsov	Shorn Sheep	Film.ua	Nominee
Screenwriter of a television program	Volodymyr Zelenskyy	Studio Kvartal 95	INTER	Winner
Screenwriter of a television program	Serhiy Atroshchenko	Big Difference in Ukrainian	Sredada	Nominee
Screenwriter of a television program	Tala Onishchuk	Ukraine's Got Talent	MMC-STB	Nominee
Producer of a television film/series	Boris Shefir, Serhiy Shefir, Volodymyr Zelenskyy, Sergey Sozanovsky, Andrey Yakovlev	Matchmakers	INTER	Winner
Producer of a television film/series	Valery Babych, Vlad Ryashin (MeStar), Sergey Alekseevich Antonov, Andrey Alekseevich Rizvanyuk	Shorn Sheep	Film.ua	Nominee
TV Producer	Galina Piliutikova, Ruslan Gorodnichy	Ukraine's Got Talent	MMC-STB	Winner
TV Producer	Boris Shefir, Serhiy Shefir, Volodymyr Zelenskyy	Evening Quarter	INTER	Nominee
TV Producer	Oksana Kucherova	Change Woman	1+1	Nominee
Best actress in a television film/series	Lyudmila Artemyeva	Matchmakers	INTER	Winner
Best actress in a television film/series	Victoria Litvinenko-Yasinovskaya	Only Love	1+1	Nominee
Best actress in a television film/series	Yulia Snihir	Heaven in Fire	Star Media	Nominee
Best actor in a television film/series	Fyodor Dobronravov	Matchmakers	INTER	Winner
Best actor in a television film/series	Pronyn Eugene	Heaven in Fire	Star Media	Nominee
Best actor in a television film/series	Nikitin Alexander	Only Love	1+1	Nominee
Television Novella		Neighbors	INTER	Winner
Television Novella		Ring	INTER	Nominee
Television Novella		Only Love	1+1	Nominee
Television Art Series		Matchmakers	INTER	Winner
Television Art Series		Heaven in Fire	Star Media	Nominee
Television Art Series		Gluhur	Ukraine	Nominee
Television feature film/simile		Shorn Sheep	Film.ua	Winner
Television feature film/simile		Like the Cossacks	INTER	Nominee
Television feature film/simile		Two	INTER	Nominee
Television Documentary Series		The Last History of Ukraine: The Next Hetman	Dmitry Kharitonov Studio	Winner
Television Documentary Series		The Age of Football	ICTV	Nominee
Television Documentary Film		Dr. Jaim. Experiments on people	INTER	Winner
Television Documentary Film		Pulse for Commodity, or the Sacrament of the Death of Shchors	Dmitry Kharitonov Studio	Nominee
Television Documentary Film		Heritage of Andrey Sheptytsky	Star Media	Nominee
Operator of a television film/series	Askarov Radik	Heaven in Fire	Star Media	Winner
Operator of a television film/series	Sergey Bordenyuk	Ey Heart	New Studio	Nominee
Operator of a television film/series	Muravyov Pavlo	Only Love	1+1	Nominee
Teleprogram Operator	Yurii Metallov	Star Factory 3	New Channel	Winner
Teleprogram Operator	Valentin Kaganovich	Searching for the Truth: Personal Secrets of Adolf Hitler	MMC-STB	Nominee
Teleprogram Operator	Valery Chumak	BOOM	INTER	Nominee
Teleprogram Operator	Tymoshenko Konstantin	Change Woman	1+1	Nominee
Artist - director of a television film/series	Ukhov Oleg	Heaven in Fire	Star Media	Winner
Artist - director of a television film/series	Vlad Odudenko	Shorn Sheep	Film.ua	Nominee
Artist - director of a television film/series	Azaman Gogushev	Only Love	1+1	Nominee
Artist - director of a TV program	Gennady Mironenko	Star Factory 3	New Channel	Winner
Artist - director of a TV program	Maria Kobyletska	Friday evening	Ledokol Ibil	Nominee
Artist - director of a TV program	Pylyp Nirod	Searching for the Truth: Kateryna II, Passion and Power	MMC-STB	Nominee
Artist in the light of television programs	Maxim Balashov	Everybody Dances!	ALIGT (ALYTE)	Winner
Artist in the light of television programs	Alexander Degtyar		1+1	Nominee
Light directing of a TV program	Alexander Degtyar	Star Factory 3	New Channel	Winner
Light directing of a TV program	Alexander Degtyar	Superstar	1+1	Nominee
Light directing of a TV program	Alexander Degtyar	Shuster Live	ALIGT (ALYTE)	Nominee
The image of a television film/series	Oleg Beauce	Right to Pardon (Right to Pleasure)	Star Media	Winner
The image of a television film/series	Vasyl Krempa		1+1	Nominee
Sound engineer of a television film/series	Oleksandr Dyachenko	Only Love	1+1	Winner
Sound engineer of a television film/series	Fyodorov Andrey Nikolaevich		1+1	Nominee
Sound engineer of a TV program	Sergey Ugarov	The Freedom of Speech	ICTV	Winner
Sound engineer of a TV program	Halyna Pavlichuk	Pride of the Country 2009	New Channel	Nominee
Sound engineer of a TV program	Serafima Panchenko		INTER	Nominee
Composer of the television film/series	Yegor Olesov	Shorn Sheep	Film.ua	Winner
Composer of the television film/series	Mikhail Alekseev	Blued Deotes	Star Media	Nominee
Composer of the television film/series	Sergey Mogilevskiy		1+1	Nominee
Teleprogram composer	Konstantin Meladze	Star Factory 3	New Channel	Winner
Teleprogram composer	Andriy Kuzmenko (Skryabin)	The Third Half	ICTV	Nominee
Teleprogram composer	Roman Boyko	Mystical Stories with Pavel Kostitin	Film.ua	Nominee
Television design		BOOM - Battle of Ukrainian Cities	INTER	Winner
Television design		Battle of psychics-6. Black and White	MMC-STB	Nominee
Television design		NTN	NTN	Nominee
Television design		Autumn/Winter season 2009/2010	1+1	Nominee
Promotional campaign		Ukraine's Got Talent	MMC-STB	Winner
Promotional campaign		BOOM - Battle of Ukrainian Cities	INTER	Nominee
Promotional campaign		2010 FIFA World Cup	ICTV	Nominee
Regional Awards
Information program - region		Day City	CiTi TV	Winner
Information program - region		Day	Rivne Regional State Television and Radio Company	Nominee
Information program - region		Our Reporter	Lux TRC	Nominee
Host/host of a program of any format - region	Dobrovolskaya Lyudmila		CiTi TV	Winner
Host/host of a program of any format - region	Danilov Viktor Evgenievich		Rivne 1	Nominee
Host/host of a program of any format - region	Lyudmila Kononenko		Kyiv TV	Nominee
Program of any format - region		7 Days of City	Gravis LLC, CiTi TV	Winner
Program of any format - region		Lviv. Chronicles of the ancient city	Independent Television Agency	Nominee
Program of any format - region		Legends City	CiTi TV	Nominee

== 2011 ==
Category	Nominee(s)	Program	Production company / Channel	Result
Special prize "Teletriumfu - 2011"	Volodymyr Borodiansky		STB	Winner
Special contribution to Ukrainian television	Vyacheslav Kudin	–	–	Winner
Ukrainian translation (Multi-episode feature film)		Clan Soprano	NPO (USA), Studio TV+, ICTV	Winner
Ukrainian translation		Hell's Kitchen	CiTi TV, ZIK	Nominee
Ukrainian translation (Ukrainian translation-dub of feature film)		Rackless	1+1	Nominee
Best Promotional campaign		X-Factor	STB	Winner
Best Promotional campaign		Summer promotional campaign	TET	Nominee
Best Promotional campaign		New Year's promotional campaign	ICTV	Nominee
Best Promotional campaign		Everyone Dances!	STB	Nominee
Television Art Series		Matchmakers	INTER / Star Media	Winner
Television Art Series		In the forests and on the mountains	INTER / Star Media	Nominee
Television Art Series		Ballad about the bomber	Film.ua	Nominee
Television Documentary Film		Almost an adult. Diary of Twenty Years	STB	Winner
Television Documentary Film		Fairy Tale of 12 rounds	INTER	Nominee
Television Documentary Film		Ukraine. Point of reference	Ukraine	Nominee
Children's program		Dr. Komarovsky's School	INTER	Winner
Children's program		Cartoon with Luntik	TET	Nominee
Children's program		Dawn	ICTV	Nominee
Sports program		3 Times	ICTV	Winner
Sports program		Football Week	Ukraine	Nominee
Sports program		Profootball	2+2	Nominee
Humorous program		Great Difference in Ukrainian	1+1	Winner
Humorous program		Do me funny	New Channel	Nominee
Humorous program		Laugh at the Comedian	INTER	Nominee
Socio-political show		The Freedom of Speech	ICTV	Winner
Socio-political show		Republic with Anna Bezulyk	Channel 5	Nominee
Socio-political show		Big Politics with Evgeny Kiselyov	INTER	Nominee
Information-analytical program		Facts of the week with Oksana Sokolova	ICTV	Winner
Information-analytical program		TSN: Tyzhden	1+1	Nominee
Information-analytical program		Details of the Week	INTER	Nominee
Special report		Money	1+1	Winner
Special report	Alexander Ilyinov	Maximum in Ukraine: Body for Spare Parts	ICTV	Nominee
Special report		Windows-News: Underground. The Smell of a Big City.	STB	Nominee
Information program		Windows-News	STB	Winner
Information program		TSN	1+1	Nominee
Information program		Facts	ICTV	Nominee
Operator of a television feature film/series	Alexey Lamakh	Represent at any price	Film.ua, STB	Winner
Operator of a television feature film/series	Sergey Ryabets	Caravan Hunters	Star Media, ICTV	Nominee
Operator of a television feature film/series	Alexey Zdelekrudub	True story about the Red Sails	INTER	Nominee
Director of a television feature film/series	Andrey Yakovlev	Matchmakers	INTER	Winner
Director of a television feature film/series	Sergey Chekalov	Caravan Hunters	Star Media, ICTV	Nominee
Director of a television feature film/series	Yaroslav Lastovetsky, Halyna Kuvvchak-Sakhno, Olga Orekhova	Hello, Mom!	ISTIL Studios, INTER	Nominee
Producer of a television film/series	Maksim Sukhanov, Viktor Mirsky, Maxim Asadchiy	Batber Ballad	Film.ua, ICTV	Winner
Producer of a television film/series	Vlad Ryashin, Alexey Terentyev	Caravan Hunters	Star Media, ICTV	Nominee
Producer of a television film/series	Andrey Yakovlev, Volodymyr Zelenskyy, Serhiy Shefir, Boris Shefir	Matchmakers	INTER	Nominee
Actress of a television film/series (female role)	Tatiana Kravchenko	Matchmakers	INTER	Winner
Actress of a television film/series (female role)	Kateryna Kynten	Hello, Mom!	ISTIL Studios, INTER	Nominee
Actress of a television film/series (female role)	Marina Alexandrova	I will not give you to anyone	Star Media, INTER	Nominee
Actor of a television film/series (male role)	Alexey Gorbunov	Grava under the snow	Star Media, 1+1	Winner
Actor of a television film/series (male role)	Vitaliy Saliy	Swallow's Nest	New Channel	Nominee
Actor of a television film/series (male role)	Mykola Dobrynin	Matchmakers	INTER	Nominee
Artist-director of a television program	Volodymyr Koshovyi	Molded in Ukraine	INTER	Winner
Artist-director of a television program	Mikhail Morozov	People's Star	Ukraine	Nominee
Artist-director of a television program	Oleg Sokhatsky	Republic with Anna Bezulyk	Channel 5	Nominee
Screenwriter of a TV program	Tala Onishchuk	X-Factor	STB	Winner
Screenwriter of a TV program	Volodymyr Zelenskyy, Serhiy Shefir, Boris Shefir, Valery Zhydkov, Oleksandr Pikalov, Olena Zelenska, Vadim Pereverzev, Roman Marov, Bogdan Tsyganok, Sergey Shynkaruk, Alexander Starominsky, Artem Mikhailichenko, Maxim Gural, Dmitry Kuchmar	Evening Quarter	Kvartal 95, INTER	Nominee
Screenwriter of a TV program	Viktor Medvedsky, Sergey Antroshchenko	Great Difference in Ukrainian	1+1	Nominee
Best television program design		Night Owl	ICTV	Winner
Best television program design		Evening news	1+1	Nominee
Regional Awards
Program of any format - region		Legend City	CiTi TV, ZIK	Winner
Program of any format - region		Old Kyiv	CiTi TV, ZIK	Nominee
Program of any format - region		Object 2012. The whole truth about the Euro!	CiTi TV, ZIK	Nominee
Information program - region		City Day	CiTi TV, ZIK	Winner
Information program - region		Channel 11 News	Channel 11, Dnipropetrovsk, TRK "Sterkh"	Nominee
Information program - region		Time of the news of Donbass	Donbas TV	Nominee
Host/host of a program of any format - region	Dobrovolskaya Lyudmila	7 Days of City	CiTi TV, ZIK	Winner
Host/host of a program of any format - region	Dmytro Dobrodomov	Who lives here?	TRC Bridge TV, ZIK	Nominee
Host/host of a program of any format - region	Igor Pupkov	Day of City	CiTi TV, ZIK	Nominee

== 2012 ==
Category	Nominee	Program	Channel	Result
Special contribution to Ukrainian television	Evgeny Romanovich Tkachenko			
Information program		Details	INTER	Winner
Information program		Television News Service	1+1	Nominee
Information program		Facts	ICTV	Nominee
Leader/host of information program	Anastasia Daugule	Details	INTER	Nominee
Leader/host of information program	Elena Frolyak	Facts	ICTV	Winner
Leader/host of information program	Tetiana Vysotska	Windows-News	STB	Nominee
Reporter	Volodymyr Sokolov	Facts of the Week with Oksana Sokolova	ICTV	Nominee
Reporter	Larysa Zadorozhna	Details of the Week	INTER	Nominee
Reporter	Olga Kashpor	TSN: Week	1+1	Winner
Information-analytical program		Details of the Week	INTER	Nominee
Information-analytical program		TSN: Week	1+1	Winner
Information-analytical program		Facts of the Week with Oksana Sokolova	ICTV	Nominee
Presenter of an information-analytical program	Alla Mazur	TSN: Week	1+1	Winner
Presenter of an information-analytical program	Oksana Sokolova	Facts of the Week with Oksana Sokolova	ICTV	Nominee
Presenter of an information-analytical program	Oleg Panyuta	Details of the Week	INTER	Nominee
Socio-social talk show		On Life	INTER	Nominee
Socio-social talk show		Shuster life. Adrenaline	Savik Shuster Studio, First National	Nominee
Socio-social talk show		Ukraine Speaks	Ukraine	Winner
Political talk show		Republic with Anna Bezulyk	Channel 5	Nominee
Political talk show		The Freedom of Speech (ICTV)	ICTV	Winner
Political talk show		Shuster Live	Savik Shuster Studio, First National	Nominee
Leader / host of entertainment program	Volodymyr Zelenskyy, Valery Zhydkov	Evening Kyiv	Kvartal 95, INTER	Winner
Leader / host of entertainment program	Kateryna Osadcha	The Voice	1+1	Nominee
Leader / host of entertainment program	Oksana Marchenko	X-factor. Revolution	STB	Nominee
Interviewer	Anastasia Kasilova	Piknik	New channel	Nominee
Interviewer	Anna Teslenko (Ahawa)	Oar Football	ICTV	Nominee
Interviewer	Sergey Dorofeev	Portraits with Sergey Dorofeev	Channel 5	Winner
Information and entertainment program		Durnev +1	TET	Nominee
Information and entertainment program		Inspector	New Channel	Winner
Information and entertainment program		Breakfast with 1+1	1+1	Nominee
Cooking program		Culinary Dynasty	STB	Nominee
Cooking program		Kitchen for Two	New Channel	Nominee
Cooking program		Match at a Plate	INTER	Winner
Humorous program		Evening Quarter	Kvartal 95, INTER	Winner
Humorous program		People, horses, rabbits and home rollers	Pilot Studio, ICTV	Nominee
Humorous program		Parade of advice	New Channel	Nominee
Program for children		The Tale of the House	TV-5	Nominee
Program for children		Heavenly Lullaby	Sphere-TV	Nominee
Program for children		School of Young Superagent	First National	Winner
Format program		The Voice: New Story	1+1	Nominee
Format program		Weighted and Happy	STB	Nominee
Format program		X-factor. Revolution	STB	Winner
Host/host of talk show	Yevgeny Komarovsky	Dr. Komarovsky's School	Film.ua, INTER	Winner
Host/host of talk show	Andriy Kulykov	The Freedom of Speech	ICTV	Nominee
Host/host of talk show	Savik Shuster	Shuster Live	Savik Shuster Studio, First National	Nominee
Sports program		Big Boxing	INTER	Winner
Sports program		Great Football	Ukraine	Nominee
Sports program		Profootball	2+2	Nominee
Leader/hostess of sports programs	Alexander Denisov	Football Weekend	Ukraine	Winner
Leader/hostess of sports programs	Andrey Kovalsky	Facts: Sport	ICTV	Nominee
Leader/hostess of sports programs	Roman Kademin	Big Boxing	INTER	Nominee
Television feature film/mini series		Champions in the Gateway	INTER	Nominee
Television feature film/mini series		Angels of War	Film.ua, INTER	Winner
Television feature film/mini series		Pandora's Box	Star Media, INTER	Nominee
Television Art Series		Test Letter	Film.ua, INTER	Nominee
Television Art Series		Island of Useless People	Star Media, INTER	Winner
Television Art Series		Matchmakers	Kvartal 95, INTER	Nominee
Television novella		Women's Doctor	Film.ua, INTER	Winner
Television novella		Katina Love	Ukraine	Nominee
Television novella		Marusya. Tests	Ukraine	Nominee
Television sitcom/ sketchcom		Fables of Mitya	Kvartal 95, INTER	Winner
Television sitcom/ sketchcom		Bar Dac	TET	Nominee
Television sitcom/ sketchcom		Taxi	Empire of Good, ICTV	Nominee
Actress of a television film/series (female role)	Irma Vitovska	Waiting Letter	Film.ua, INTER	Winner
Actress of a television film/series (female role)	Anna Koshmal	Matchmakers	Kvartal 95, INTER	Nominee
Actress of a television film/series (female role)	Karina Andolenko	Millionaire	Star Media, INTER	Nominee
Actor of a television film/series (male role)	Bohdan Stupka	Once in Rostov	INTER	Winner
Actor of a television film/series (male role)	Oleg Shkolnik	Life and Adventures of the Smile of the Sun	Star Media, INTER	Nominee
Actor of a television film/series (male role)	Alexander Pyatkov	Matchmakers	Kvartal 95, INTER	Nominee

== 2013 ==
Category	Nominee(s)	Program/Project	Channel/Company	Result
Best Information and Analytical Program	Alla Mazur	TSN: Week	1+1	Winner
Best Information and Analytical Program	Oksana Sokolova	Facts of the Week: 100 minutes with Oksana Sokolova	ICTV	Nominee
Best Information and Analytical Program	Oleg Panyuta	Events of the Week	Ukraine	Nominee
Essential promo, promotional campaign		Hell's Kitchen	1+1	Winner
Essential promo, promotional campaign		Remember to live	ICTV	Nominee
Essential promo, promotional campaign		Thank you that they don't know	INTER	Nominee
Promotional campaign (complex)		It Concerns Everyone	INTER	Winner
Promotional campaign (complex)		Great Race	1+1	Nominee
Promotional campaign (complex)		Sobytiya	Ukraine	Nominee
Stylist	Svetlana Rymakova, Irina Belina, Elena Tvelina	ShowMountain (makeup team)	New Channel	Winner
Stylist	Dmitry Kuryata	Everyone Dances!	STB	Nominee
Stylist	Natalia Skarzhepa	Victory: One for All.	INTER	Nominee
Television program design		It Concerns Everyone	INTER	Winner
Television program design		Guten Morgen	M1	Nominee
Television program design		Teletriumph 2012	Ukraine	Nominee
TV channel ID design		Christmas Trees	ICTV	Winner
TV channel ID design		Snowmen	Ukraine	Nominee
TV channel ID design		Autumn advertising campaign	STB	Nominee
Host of an information program	Nataliia Moseichuk	TSN	1+1	Winner
Host of an information program	Tetiana Vysotska	Windows-News	STB	Nominee
Host of an information program	Anastasia Daugule	Details	INTER	Nominee
Host of an information-analytical program	Alla Mazur	TSN: Week	1+1	Winner
Host of an information-analytical program	Oksana Sokolova	Facts of the Week with Oksana Sokolova	ICTV	Nominee
Host of an information-analytical program	Andiry Smiyan	Results of the Week	National Television Company of Ukraine	Nominee
Information program		TSN	1+1	Winner
Information program		Facts	ICTV	Nominee
Information program		Details	INTER	Nominee
Reporter	Olga Kashpor	TSN: Week	1+1	Winner
Reporter	Mykhalio Tkach	Money	1+1	Nominee
Reporter	Dmitry Anopchenko	Details of the Week	INTER	Nominee
Special report		Money	1+1	Winner
Special report		The Territorial of Deception	1+1	Nominee
Special report		Critical Point	Ukraine	Nominee
Best Interviewer	Yulia Lytvynenko	Separate Opinion	TVi	Winner
Best Interviewer	Nadezha Matveeva	Everything will be Fine	STB	Nominee
Best Interviewer	Sergey Dorofeev	Pedosakhalnye Interview: Holy Patriarch of Moscow and All Kill Russia	INTER	Nominee
Talk show host	Andriy Kulykov	The Freedom of Speech	ICTV	Winner
Talk show host	Sergey Dorofeev	It Concerns Everyone	INTER	Nominee
Talk show host	Ruslan Snichkin	Breakfast with 1+1	1+1	Nominee
Political talk show		The Freedom of Speech	ICTV	Winner
Political talk show		Shuster LIVE	INTER	Nominee
Political talk show		1941: Forbidden Truth	Ukraine	Nominee
Socio-social talk show		Ukraine Speaks	Ukraine	Winner
Socio-social talk show		It Concerns Everyone	INTER	Nominee
Socio-social talk show		One for All	STB	Nominee
Host of an Entertainment program	Volodymyr Zelenskyy	Evening Quarter	Kvartal 95	Winner
Host of an Entertainment program	Olga Freimut	Inspector	New Channel	Nominee
Host of an Entertainment program	Yuri Gorbunov	Great Pekarsky Tournament	1+1	Nominee
Information and entertainment program		Evening Kyiv	Kvartal 95	Winner
Information and entertainment program		Heads or Tails	INTER	Nominee
Information and entertainment program		Inspector	New Channel	Nominee
Humorous program		Evening Quarter	Kvartal 95	Winner
Humorous program		Great Difference	INTER	Nominee
Humorous program		The Pedan-Prytula Show	New Channel	Nominee
Music program/film		Brussels	M1	Winner
Music program/film		Music for Adults with Maria Burmaka	TVi	Nominee
Music program/film		Karaoke on the Maidan	KNM Studio	Nominee
Children's program		Dawn	ICTV	Winner
Children's program		Kid's Time	New Channel	Nominee
Children's program		TIVI Alphabet: Letter B	Pixel TV	Nominee
Format program		The Voice	1+1	Winner
Format program		X-Factor	STB	Nominee
Format program		ShowMountain	New Channel	Nominee
Host of sports program	Roman Kademin	Big Boxing	INTER	Winner
Host of sports program	Andrey Kovalsky	Facts: Sports	ICTV	Nominee
Host of sports program	Alexander Denisov	Big Football	Football	Nominee
Sports program		Big Boxing	INTER	Winner
Sports program		Big Football	Football	Nominee
Sports program		Facts: Sports	ICTV	Nominee
Sports commentator	Victor Vatsko		Football	Winner
Sports commentator	Dmitry Laztkin	Big Boxing	INTER	Nominee
Sports commentator	Igor Tsyganik		2+2	Nominee
Operator/TV director	Volodymyr Guievskyi	Great Pekarsky Tournament	1+1	Winner
Operator/TV director	Oleg Shevchshyn, Konstantin Loboda	Heads or Tails	INTER	Nominee
Operator/TV director	Stanislav Ilyin	The Bachelor	STB	Nominee
Producer(s) of a Television program	Volodymyr Zelenskyy, Sergey Shefir, Boris Shefir, Andrey Yakovlev	St. Storm Russia	Kvartal 95	Winner
Producer(s) of a Television program	Igor Zolotarevsky, Darina Ogir, Ilarion Pavlyuk, Oleg Rogozha, Vladimir Rybas	DNA: Portrait of Ukraine	Ukraine	Nominee
Producer(s) of a Television program	Irina Ionova	Victory: One for All	INTER	Nominee
Director(s) of a television program	Rita Yakovenchuk, Mykhailo Horodny	Everybody Dances!	STB	Winner
Director(s) of a television program	Volodymyr Zelenskyy, Mykhailo Komarovsky	Evening Quarter	Kvartal 95	Nominee
Director(s) of a television program	Olena Chorna	Weighted and Happy	STB	Nominee
Director(s) of a television program	Elena Kolyadenko	Victory: One for All	INTER	Nominee
Screenwriter (Scenario group) of a TV program	Volodymyr Zelenskyy, Serhiy Shefir, Boris Shefir, Zhydkov Valerii, Oleksandr Pikalov, Olena Zelenska, Pereverzev Vadym, Roman Marov, Bohdan Tsyganok, Serhii Shynkaruk, Oleksandr Starominskyi, Artem Mykhailichenko, Maksym Hural, Dmytro Kuchmar, Oleksandr Haienko, Oleksii Pavlenko, Oleksandr Ivanov, Mykhailo Martyniuk, Oleksandr Shchur, Stanislav Zubrytskyi, Serhii Ts	Kvartal 95	Kvartal 95	Winner
Screenwriter (Scenario group) of a TV program	Daria Mayboroda	Beloved, We Kill Children	STB	Nominee
Screenwriter (Scenario group) of a TV program	Anton Nikitin, Dmitry Drabik, Natalia Slyvnska	Birthday of the Country	INTER	Nominee
Art director	Borys Mukhin	Teletriumph 2012	Ukraine	Winner
Art director	Vladimir Koshovy	Victory: One for All	INTER	Nominee
Art director	Gregory Ermolin	Weighted and Happy	STB	Nominee
Actor (TV film/series)	Sergey Strelnikov	Passion for Chapay	Film.ua	Winner
Actor (TV film/series)	Alexander Kobzar	Sun	Star Media	Nominee
Actor (TV film/series)	Garik Birch	Vitalyka	TET	Nominee
Actress (TV film/series)	Olesya Zhurakivska	Rozha in the Void	Film.ua	Winner
Actress (TV film/series)	Olga Sumskaya	The Last Role of Rita	Star Media	Nominee
Actress (TV film/series)	Anna Koshmal	Matchmakers	Kvartal 95	Nominee
Producer(s) TV film/series	Galina Balan-Timkina, Vlad Ryashin	Anna German	Star Media	Winner
Producer(s) TV film/series	Andrey Yakovlev, Vladimir Zelensky, Sergey Shefir, Boris Shefir	Matchmakers	Kvartal 95	Nominee
Producer(s) TV film/series	Kateryna Shvets, Olesya Lukyanenko	Butterflies	Film.ua	Nominee
Director (TV feature film/series)	Oleksandr Timenko	Anna German	Star Media	Winner
Director (TV feature film/series)	Andrey Yakovlev	Matchmakers	Kvartal 95	Nominee
Director (TV feature film/series)	Anna Gres	The Road to the Void	Film.ua	Nominee
Director (TV documentary)	Ihor Kobryn	1941	Ukraine	Winner
Director (TV documentary)	Sofia Chemerys	Flower: Voice in a Single Copy	INTER	Nominee
Director (TV documentary)	Volodymyr Rybas	DNA: Portrait of Ukraine	Ukraine	Nominee
Screenwriter (TV film/series)	Alina Semeryakova	Anna German	Star Media	Winner
Screenwriter (TV film/series)	Lesya Vakulyuk, Natalia Kovaleva	Flower: Voice in a Single Copy	INTER	Nominee
Screenwriter (TV film/series)	Andrey Yakovlev, Alexey Zhilenkov, Andrey Ilkov, Yuri Mikulenko, Yuri Poyunov, Timofey Sayenko, Alexey Zhuk, Andrey Nesterov	Matchmakers	Kvartal 95	Nominee
TV documentary miniseries		Bogdan Stupka. Forget the word "death"	INTER	Winner
TV documentary miniseries		1941	Ukraine	Nominee
TV documentary miniseries		Flower: Voice in a Single Copy	INTER	Nominee
TV art series		Anna German	Star Media	Winner
TV art series		The Son of the Father of Nations	INTER	Nominee
TV art series		Matchmakers	Kvartal 95	Nominee
TV feature film/mini series		Butterflies	Film.ua	Winner
TV feature film/mini series		Love for Love	Star Media	Nominee
TV feature film/mini series		Nakhalka	Ukraine	Nominee
TV sketch/net		Fairy Tale Rus	Kvartal 95	Winner
TV sketch/net		Vitalyka	TET	Nominee
TV sketch/net		Forge of Stars 3	Empire of Good	Nominee
Audio design		It Concerns Everyone	INTER	Winner
Audio design		Castantip	M1	Nominee
Audio design		Vitalyka	TET	Nominee
Composer (TV film/series)	Danylo Yudelevic	Anna German	Star Media	Winner
Composer (TV film/series)	Alexander Udovenko	Matchmakers	Kvartal 95	Nominee
Composer (TV film/series)	Andrey Kravchenko	Jamaica	Ukraine	Nominee
Regional Awards
Regional program host	Vakhtang Kipiani	Historical Truth	ZIK	Winner
Regional documentary film		Day is Like a Moment	Lviv Regional State TV/Radio	Winner
Regional program (any format)		180 Degrees: Kindness Syndrome	Association of Mercy "Emmanuel"	Winner
Regional reporter	Natalia Makhnyuk	Big Fish	Channel 34	Winner
Regional information program		Details	Channel 34	Winner

== 2014 ==
There were no awards in 2014.

== 2015 ==
Category	Nominee(s)	Program	Company / Channel	Result
Opening of the Year (Special Award)		The Sniffer	Film.ua	Winner
Actor of a television film or series	Alexey Gorbunov	Schuler	Star Media	Winner
Actor of a television film or series	Stanislav Boklan	When We're Home	STB	Nominee
Actor of a television film or series	Volodymyr Zelenskyy	Love in the Big City 3	Kvartal 95	Nominee
Actress of a television film or series	Eugenia Gladiy	Trap	Film.ua	Winner
Actress of a television film or series	Catherine Kinten	When We're Home	STB	Nominee
Actress of a television film or series	Lyudmila Ignatenko	Schuler	Star Media	Nominee
Leader/Presenter of information/ information-analytical program	Alla Mazur	TSN: Tyzhden	1+1	Winner
Leader/Presenter of information/ information-analytical program	Oksana Sokolova	Facts of the Week with Oksana Sokolova	ICTV	Nominee
Leader/Presenter of information/ information-analytical program	Tetiana Vysotska	Windows-News	STB	Nominee
Leader/Host of entertainment program	Volodymyr Zelenskyy	Evening Quarter	Kvartal 95	Winner
Leader/Host of entertainment program	Lesya Nikityuk	Heads or Tails	Tinspiretus Studio	Nominee
Leader/Host of entertainment program	Serhiy Prytula	Who's on Top?	New Channel	Nominee
Leader/Host of sports programs	Alexander Denisov	Big Football	Football 1 / Football 2	Winner
Leader/Host of sports programs	Andrey Stepanovich Kovalsky	Facts: Sport	ICTV	Nominee
Leader/Host of sports programs	Igor Tsyganik	On the Europa League	2+2	Nominee
Host of a talk show	Alexey Sukhanov	Ukraine Speaks	Ukraine	Winner
Host of a talk show	Andriy Kulykov	The Freedom of Speech	ICTV	Nominee
Host of a talk show	Akhtem Seitablaev	Brave Hearts	1+1	Nominee
Host of a talk show	Serhiy Prytula	The Passion of the Auditor	New Channel	Nominee
Humorous program		Evening Quarter	Kvartal 95	Winner
Humorous program		Mamahotas-show	ULL TV	Nominee
Humorous program		Diesel Show	ICTV	Nominee
Essential promo / promotional campaign		Skryabin. Concert of Remembrance	1+1	Winner
Essential promo / promotional campaign		Clan Jewelers comprehensive promotional campaign	Ukraine	Nominee
Essential promo / promotional campaign		Interer Super Cup of Ukraine: "Guvatie we are separated! We are one game!"	INTER	Nominee
Information and analytical program		Facts	ICTV	Winner
Information and analytical program		TSN: Week	1+1	Nominee
Information and analytical program		Windows-News	STB	Nominee
Information and entertainment program		Heads or Tails	Tinspiretus Studio	Winner
Information and entertainment program		Evening Kyiv	Kvartal 95	Nominee
Information and entertainment program		Everything Will be Fine	STB	Nominee
Other format entertainment programs		Who's on Top?	New Channel	Winner
Other format entertainment programs		I'm embarrassed by my body	STB	Nominee
Other format entertainment programs		Superintuition	New Channel	Nominee
Music program / film		OE.20 LIVE IN KYIV	Film.ua	Winner
Music program / film		Independence Day with OE"	STB	Nominee
Music program / film		Tina Karol. The Power of Love and Voice.	New Channel	Nominee
New Ukrainian TV format		Hut on Dad (Season 3)	STB	Winner
New Ukrainian TV format		League of Laughter	Kvartal 95	Nominee
New Ukrainian TV format		More from the Burr	INTER	Nominee
Operator/director of a television film/series	Andriy Lysetsky	Sniffer	Film.ua	Winner
Operator/director of a television film/series	Vladimir Guevsky	The Last Muscovite	1+1 Productions	Nominee
Operator/director of a television film/series	Vitaliy Dmytrovych Zaporozhchenko	Keep My Love	Axel Time productions	Nominee
Operator-director of a television program	Oleg Shevchyshyn	Heads or Tails	Tinspiretus Studio	Winner
Operator-director of a television program	Volodymyr Guievskyi	Okaana Elzy concert broadcast for Ukrainian Independence Day	1+1 Productions	Nominee
Operator-director of a television program	Yuri Meshcheryakov	X-Factor	STB	Nominee
Program for children		The Tale with Dad – 2	PLUSPLUS	Winner
Program for children		This is Ours and This is Yours	PLUSPLUS	Nominee
Program for children		Useful Hints	PLUSPLUS	Nominee
Journalistic investigations program		Money	1+1	Winner
Journalistic investigations program		Insider	STB	Nominee
Journalistic investigations program		Get!	ICTV	Nominee
Producer(s) of a TV film/series	Artem Dollezhal, Vlad Ryashin	Schuler	Star Media	Winner
Producer(s) of a TV film/series	Olesya Lukyanenko, Alexander Moskalenko	House with Lilies	Film.ua	Nominee
Producer(s) of a TV film/series	Volodymyr Zelenskyy, Serhiy Shefir, Borys Shefir, Andriy Yakovlev	1+1 at Home for New Year's	Kvartal 95	Nominee
Producer(s) of a TV program	Victoria Lezina-Maslyana, Vladimir Zavadyuk, Anna Aksyutenko	The Voice: Children (Season 2)	1+1	Winner
Producer(s) of a TV program	Volodymyr Zelenskyy, Andrej Chivurin, Naum Barul, Serhiy Shefir, Boris Shefir, Andrey Yakovlev	League of Laughter	Kvartal 95	Nominee
Producer(s) of a TV program	Vladimir Turich, Elizaveta Altsiebeeva	MasterChef (Season 4)	STB	Nominee
Director of a TV film/series	Artem Litvinenko	Sniffer	Film.ua	Winner
Director of a TV film/series	Semyon Gorov	The Last Muscovite	1+1	Nominee
Director of a TV film/series	Kvartal 95	1+1 at Home for New Year's	Kvartal 95	Nominee
Director(s) of a TV program	Evgeny Sinelnikov	Heads or Tails	Tinspiretus Studio	Winner
Director(s) of a TV program	Volodymyr Zelenskyy	Evening Quarter	Kvartal 95	Nominee
Director(s) of a TV program	Andriy Muzyka	Independence Day with "Okean Elzy"	1+1 Productions	Nominee
Reporter	Roman Bochkala	Details of Nedela	National Information Systems	Winner
Reporter	Alexander Motorny	TSN: Airport	1+1	Nominee
Reporter	Ruslan Yarmolyuk	TSN: Debaltsevo	1+1	Nominee
Reporter	Stanislav Yasinsky	TSN: Children of War	1+1	Nominee
Sports program		Great Football: Brazil 2014	Football 1 / Football 2	Winner
Sports program		Facts: Sport	ICTV	Nominee
Sports program		Profootball	2+2	Nominee
Sports commentator	Victor Vatsko	Germany vs. Argentina	Football 1 / Football 2	Winner
Sports commentator	Andriy Malinovsky	Dynamo vs. Shakhtar		Nominee
Sports commentator	Vladimir Kobelkov	UEFA Europa League Semifinals: Dnipro vs. Napoli	2+2	Nominee
Socio-Social talk show		Brave Hearts	1+1	Winner
Socio-Social talk show		Ukraine Speaks	Ukraine	Nominee
Socio-Social talk show		One for All	STB	Nominee
Screenwriters of TV film/mini-series	Maria Beck, Elena Boyko	House with Lilies	Film.ua	Winner
Screenwriters of TV film/mini-series	Mykola Kutsyk	The Last Muscovite	1+1	Nominee
Screenwriters of TV film/mini-series	Mykola Rybalka	Guard	2+2	Nominee
Screenwriters of TV film/mini-series		When We're Home	STB	Nominee
Screenwriters of TV program	Screenwriting group	Evening Quarter	Kvartal 95	Winner
Screenwriters of TV program	Nikita Chizhov, Sergey Simmanchuk	Heads or Tails	Tinspiretus Studio	Nominee
Screenwriters of TV program	Akim Galimov	Operation Crimea	1+1 Productions	Nominee
Television novella		Grechanka	Film.ua	Winner
Television novella		Clan Jewelers	Ukraine	Nominee
Television novella		Dvornyazhka Lyalya	Ukraine	Nominee
TV design (channel)		Spring-Winter Season	Ukraine	Winner
TV design (channel)		Ferromagnetic	ICTV	Nominee
TV design (channel)		1+1 design	1+1	Nominee
TV design (program)		X-Factor	STB	Winner
TV design (program)		Breakfast with 1+1	1+1	Nominee
TV design (program)		Real Mysticism	Ukraine	Nominee
Television documentary/cycle		Operation Crimea	1+1	Winner
Television documentary/cycle		History of Criminalistics	Film.ua	Nominee
Television documentary/cycle		Revolution of Dignity	ICTV	Nominee
TV net/sketch comedy		Fairytale Rus	Kvartal 95	Winner
TV net/sketch comedy		When We're Home	STB	Nominee
TV net/sketch comedy		Country In	DRIVE	Nominee
Television art series		The Sniffer	Film.ua	Winner
Television art series		Schuler	Star Media	Nominee
Television art series		The Last Muscovite	1+1	Nominee
Television feature film / mini-series		Unbreakable	Film.ua	Winner
Television feature film / mini-series		Guard	2+2	Nominee
Television feature film / mini-series		Lonely Contract	New Channel	Nominee
Format reality show		Weighted and Happy (Season 4)	STB	Winner
Format reality show		Beloved, We Kill Children (Season 5)	STB	Nominee
Format reality show		Supermodel in Ukrainian	New Channel	Nominee
Format talent show		The Voice. Children (Season 2)	1+1	Winner
Format talent show		X-Factor	STB	Nominee
Format talent show		MasterChef	STB	Nominee
Regional Awards
Program (any format – region)		Show them! Lviv-Donbas Show	ZIK and Donbas TV	Winner
Program (any format – region)		180 Degrees: Diana Quinn - Understand and Forgive Me	Association of Mercy "Emmanuel"	Nominee
Program (any format – region)		I'm going to you	TV5	Nominee
Leader/Host of program (region)	Yulia Minshairova	Time of the Donbass News	Donbas TV	Winner
Leader/Host of program (region)		Details	Channel 34	Nominee
Leader/Host of program (region)		Week: Results	TV5	Nominee
Information program (region)		Week: Results	TV5	Winner
Information program (region)		Time of the Donbass News	Donbas TV	Nominee
Information program (region)		Details	Channel 34	Nominee
Reporter (region)	Eugenia Melnik	Donbass Today	TV5	Winner
Reporter (region)	Olga Zhuravel	Battle for the Child 2	Channel 34	Nominee
Reporter (region)	Yuri Kireev	Register of Corrupt Officials	Channel 34	Nominee
Documentary film (region)		Contrary. Ukrainian happiness	Channel 34	Winner
Documentary film (region)		Righteous Among the World. (Episode 3: Odessa)	Association of Mercy "Emmanuel"	Nominee
Documentary film (region)		SLOU FOR TWO VOICES	Kharkiv Regional State Television and Radio Company	Nominee

== 2016 ==
Category	Nominee(s)	Program	Channel	Result
Personal contribution to the development of the Ukrainian television industry	Victoria Yarmoshchuk			Winner
Actor in a television film/series	Akhtem Seitablayev	Unconquered: Vasyl Stus	STB	Winner
Actor in a television film/series	Volodymyr Zelenskyy	Servant of the People	Kvartal 95, 1+1	Nominee
Actor in a television film/series	Mikhail Zhonin	The Next Doctor		Nominee
Actress in a television film/series	Ivanna Sakhno	Black Flower	Fresh Productions,Ukraine	Winner
Actress in a television film/series	Anna Sahaidachna	The Red Queen	INTER	Nominee
Actress in a television film/series	Ekaterina Kisten	When We're Home	STB	Nominee
Presenter of information/information-analytical program	Alla Mazur	TSN: Method	1+1	Winner
Presenter of information/information-analytical program	Nataliia Moseichuk	TSN	1+1	Nominee
Presenter of information/information-analytical program	Oksana Gutzeith	Facts	ICTV	Nominee
Host of entertainment program	Dmitry Komarov	World Inside Out	1+1	Winner
Host of entertainment program	Volodymyr Zelenskyy	Evening Quarter	Kvartal 95	Nominee
Host of entertainment program	Yuri Gorbunov	The Voice	1+1	Nominee
Host of sports program	Alexander Denisov	Big Football. Euro 2016	Ukraine,Football 1	Winner
Host of sports program	Andriy Kovalsky	Facts: Sport	ICTV	Nominee
Host of sports program	Alexandra Loboda	Profootball	2+2	Nominee
Host of talk show	Serhiy Prytula	The Passion of the Auditor	New Channel	Winner
Host of talk show	Alexey Sukhanov	Ukraine Speaks	Ukraine	Nominee
Host of talk show	Dmitry Karpachov	One For All	STB	Nominee
Humorous program		Diesel Show	ICTV	Winner
Humorous program		Evening Quarter	Kvartal 95	Nominee
Humorous program		League of Laughter	Kvartal 95	Nominee
Promo/Promo campaign		My Country. Beautiful and Independent	1+1	Winner
Promo/Promo campaign		Diesel – the Gods	ICTV	Nominee
Promo/Promo campaign		Azure Dust	Ivory Films,Ukraine	Nominee
Information/information-analytical program		TSN: Method	1+1	Winner
Information/information-analytical program		Windows-News	STB	Nominee
Information/information-analytical program		Facts	ICTV	Nominee
Information-entertainment program		Heads or Tails	Tinspiretus Studio,INTER	Winner
Information-entertainment program		Evening Kyiv	Kvartal 95	Nominee
Information-entertainment program		Secular Life with Kateryna Osadcha		Nominee
Other format entertainment program		The Voice	1+1	Winner
Other format entertainment program		Who's on Top?	New Channel	Nominee
Other format entertainment program		X-Factor	STB	Nominee
Music program/film		Eurovision: National Selection	STB	Winner
Music program/film		M1 Music Awards	M1	Nominee
Music program/film		Christmas Story with Tina Karol		Nominee
New Ukrainian television format		Laugh at the Comedian, Children	Kvartal 95, 1+1	Winner
New Ukrainian television format		The Scams in the Nets		Nominee
New Ukrainian television format		Agents of Justice		Nominee
Operator/Director of TV film/series	Sergey Koshel	Servant of the People	Kvartal 95, 1+1	Winner
Operator/Director of TV film/series	Alexey Tsvilodub	Black Flower	Fresh Productions,Ukraine	Nominee
Operator/Director of TV film/series	Serhiy Bordenyuk	Edit		Nominee
Operator/Director of a television program	Oleg Shevchyshyn, Oleg Avilov	Heads or Tails	Tinspiretus Studio,INTER	Winner
Operator/Director of a television program	Sergey Petrov	Eurovision: National Selection	STB	Nominee
Operator/Director of a television program	Solovyov Sergey	My Ukraine		Nominee
Children's program		This Is Ours and This Is Yours: Through The Eyes of Children	PLUSPLUS	Winner
Children's program		Racing to TRK, Lviv		Nominee
Children's program		A Tale with Dad 3		Nominee
Program of journalistic investigations		Money	1+1	Winner
Program of journalistic investigations		Insider	STB	Nominee
Program of journalistic investigations		Schemes: Corruption in detail	UA: Pershyi / Radio Svoboda	Nominee
Producer(s) of a TV film/series	Volodymyr Zelenskyy, Andrey Yakovlev, Oleksiy Kyryushchenko, Serhiy Shefir, Boris Shefir	Servant of the People	Kvartal 95, 1+1	Winner
Producer(s) of a TV film/series	Iryna Kostiuk, Anna Eliseeva, Yulia Mishchenko, Ella Boblenyuk, Olena Kanishevska	The Next Doctor		Nominee
Producer(s) of a TV film/series	Prikhodko Victor	Dos		Nominee
Producer(s) of a television program	Victoria Lezina, Volodymyr Zavadyuk, Anna Aksyutenko, Ruslan Quinta	The Voice	1+1	Winner
Producer(s) of a television program	Sinelnikova Elena, Mus, Smacheliuk Julia, Gubar Julia, Slobodsky Alexey	Heads or Tails	Tinspiretus Studio,INTER	Nominee
Producer(s) of a television program	Galina Pilyutykova, Natalia Franchuk, Yulia Prokhorova, Anatoly Maximov	Eurovision: National Selection	STB	Winner
Director(s) of a television documentary	Rybay, Volodymyr Illarion Pavlyuk, Oleg Rogozha	Azure Dust	Ivory Films,Ukraine	Winner
Director(s) of a television documentary	Sergey Sotnichenko, Alexey Esakov	Splitting into Atoms		Nominee
Director(s) of a television documentary	Akim Galimov, Daria Sarycheva, Ruslan Sharipov, Olga Mikhalchenko	Ukraine, The Return of Your Story		Nominee
Director of a television feature film/series	Roman Barabash	Black Flower	Fresh Productions,Ukraine	Winner
Director of a television feature film/series	Kaptan Nikolai	Dog		Nominee
Director of a television feature film/series	Anton Shcherbakov	Unconquered: Vasyl Stus	STB	Nominee
Director(s) of a television program	Evgeny Sinelnikov, Yaroslav Andrushchenko	Heads or Tails	Tinspiretus Studio,INTER	Winner
Director(s) of a television program	Antonina Chornoochenko	The Bachelor	STB	Nominee
Director(s) of a television program	Yana Fedosenko	From a Young Lady to a Young Lady		Nominee
Reporter	Mykhailo Tkach	Schemes	UA: Pershyi / Radio Svoboda	Winner
Reporter	Sergey Galchenko	TSN: Week	1+1	Nominee
Reporter	Elena Lunkova	Windows-News	STB	Nominee
Sports program		Great Football. Euro 2016	Ukraine,Football 1	Winner
Sports program		Profootball	2+2	Nominee
Sports program		Facts: Sport	ICTV	Nominee
Sports commentator	Victor Vatsko	Euro 2016: Ukraine vs. Poland		Winner
Sports commentator	Kyryl Krutorogov	Euro 2016: France vs. Germany		Nominee
Sports commentator	Vladimir Kobelkov	Vasily Lomachenko vs. Roman Martinez		Nominee
Socio-social talk show		Ukraine Speaks	Ukraine	Winner
Socio-social talk show		The Freedom of Speech	ICTV	Nominee
Socio-social talk show		The Passion of the Auditor	New Channel	Nominee
Screenwriters of a TV film/miniseries/series	Artem Litvinenko, Andrey Babek	Sniff 2	Film.ua, ICTV	Winner
Screenwriters of a TV film/miniseries/series	Andriy Yakovlev, Oleksii Kiriushchenko, Yurii Kostiuk, Yurii Mykulienko, Dmytro Hryhorenko, Mykhailo Savin, Dmytro Kozlov, Oleksandr Bragin	Servant of the People	Kvartal 95, 1+1	Nominee
Screenwriters of a TV film/miniseries/series	Serhiy Stetsenko, Tetiana Vysotska	Invictus: Vasyl Stus		Nominee
Screenwriter(s) of a TV program	Volodymyr Zelenskyy, Serhiy Shefir, Boris Shefir, Andrey Yakovlev	Evening Quarter	Kvartal 95	Winner
Screenwriter(s) of a TV program	Julian Raitsyna, Elena Krychkovskaya	From a Young Lady to a Young Lady		Nominee
Screenwriter(s) of a TV program	Symanchuk Sergey, Yusupova Taisiya, Avramenko Julia, Storozhuk Maxim	Heads or Tails	Tinspiretus Studio,INTER	Nominee
Television program design		Teletriumph 2014–2015	STB	Winner
Television program design		Splitting into Atoms		Nominee
Television program design		The Bachelor	STB	Nominee
TV channel identity design		25 independent years	1+1	Winner
TV channel identity design		New Year's: “Christmas Glove”	STB	Nominee
TV channel identity design		Ukraine: Mission 2016	Ukraine	Nominee
Television documentary miniseries		Ukraine. Return of its History	1+1	Winner
Television documentary miniseries		Splitting into Atoms		Nominee
Television documentary miniseries		Azure Dust	Ivory Films,Ukraine	Nominee
TV net/sketch comedy		When We're Home	STB	Winner
TV net/sketch comedy		Fairytale Rus	Kvartal 95	Nominee
TV net/sketch comedy		The Last Muscovite: Judgement Day		Nominee
Television art series		Servant of the People	Kvartal 95, 1+1	Winner
Television art series		The Red Queen	INTER	Nominee
Television art series		The Next Doctor		Nominee
Television feature film/miniseries		Black Flower	Fresh Productions,Ukraine	Winner
Television feature film/miniseries		To See the Rainbow...		Nominee
Television feature film/miniseries		You'll be Mine Anyway		Nominee
Format reality show		MasterChef	STB	Winner
Format reality show		Supermodel in Ukrainian 2	New Channel	Nominee
Format reality show		From a Young Lady to a Young Lady		Nominee
Opening of the year (Special Award)		Film Country Initiative	Film Country	Winner
Regional Awards
Regional reporter	Eugenia Melnik	Donbass Today	TV5	Winner
Regional reporter	Yevheniia Melnik	Sunday: Ithag		Nominee
Regional reporter	Anastasia Nevirna	Details: Results		Nominee
Regional program of any format		Maple Ballad	First Gorgorod, Kryvyi Rih	Winner
Regional program of any format		Crime and Punishment		Nominee
Regional program of any format		Normal: Investigation Department in the South		Nominee
Regional documentary film		Contrary. Mission	Channel 34	Winner
Regional documentary film		Crimea, Unconquered		Nominee
Regional documentary film		The baby’s house, Last lullaby		Nominee
Regional host/presenter of any format program	Yulia Minshakirov	Time of the News of Donbass	Donbas TV	Winner
Regional host/presenter of any format program	Andrey Bogdanovich	Nedelya. Ithag		Nominee
Regional host/presenter of any format program	Valery Gritsenko	Details	Channel 34	Nominee
Regional information program		Details	Channel 34	Winner
Regional information program		Time of the News of Donbass	Donbas TV	Nominee
Regional information program		The Day: Itag		Nominee

== 2017 ==
There were no awards held in 2017 while the awards were being reformed.

== 2018 ==
Category	Nominee(s)	Program	Channel	Result
Leading Information and Analytical Program	Alla Mazur	TSN: Method	1+1	Winner
Leading Information and Analytical Program	Oleg Panyuta	Events of the Week	Ukraine	Nominee
Leading Information and Analytical Program	Oksana Sokolova	Facts of the Week: 100 Minutes from ICTV	ICTV	Nominee
Best Informational Program (National Broadcast)	Nataliia Moseichuk	TSN	1+1	Winner
Best Informational Program (National Broadcast)	Yulia Borysko	TSN	1+1	Nominee
Best Informational Program (National Broadcast)	Svyatoslav Grynchuk	TSN	1+1	Nominee
Best Informational Program (Regional Broadcast)	Andrey Bogdanovich	Week / Results	TV5	Winner
Best Informational Program (Regional Broadcast)	Olga Sokolova	News	Channel 7 (Odessa)	Nominee
Best Informational Program (Regional Broadcast)	Marina Rudenko	News	Z	Nominee
Military Correspondent	Andrey Tsaplienko	Frontline Reports	1+1	Winner
Military Correspondent	Oleg Boldyrev	Frontline Reporting	BBC	Nominee
Military Correspondent	Yevhen Nazarenko	Military Journalism	Priamyi	Nominee
Interviewer of the Year	Yanina Sokolova	Randezvous	Channel 5	Winner
Interviewer of the Year	Natalia Vlaschenko	Hard Talk	Ukraine 24	Nominee
Interviewer of the Year	Vasyl Golovanov	Evening with Golovanov	Ukraine 24	Nominee
Best Morning Show	Yehor Hordeev, Nelya Shovkoplyas, Ruslan Senichkin, Lyudmila Barbir	Breakfast with 1+1	1+1	Winner
Best Morning Show		Morning With Ukraine	Ukraine	Nominee
Best Morning Show		Morning Show	Channel 5	Nominee
Best Entertainment Program		Premier Evening	Ukraine	Winner
Best Entertainment Program		Who's on Top?	New Channel	Nominee
Best Entertainment Program		Incredible Truth About the Stars	STB	Nominee
Best Talk Show (Political/Social)		Right to Power	1+1	Winner
Best Talk Show (Political/Social)		Ukraine with Tigran Martirosyan	Ukraine 24	Nominee
Best Talk Show (Political/Social)		Countdown	UA: Pershyi	Nominee
Best Reality Show		Exes	New Channel	Winner
Best Reality Show		Inspector	1+1	Nominee
Best Reality Show		Married at First Sight	STB	Nominee
Best Culinary Show		MasterChef	STB	Winner
Best Culinary Show		Hell's Kitchen	New Channel	Nominee
Best Culinary Show		Delicious Country	1+1	Nominee
Best Documentary Project		Ukraine. Return of its History	1+1	Winner
Best Documentary Project		Secrets of Great Ukrainians	STB	Nominee
Best Documentary Project		Ukraine of the Future	ICTV	Nominee
Best Sports Program		Profutbol Digital	2+2	Winner
Best Sports Program		Football News	Football 1 / Football 2	Nominee
Best Sports Program		Sports Marathon	Suspilne	Nominee
Best Journalistic Investigation		Secrets of War	ICTV	Winner
Best Journalistic Investigation		Schemes	UA: Pershyi / Radio Svoboda	Nominee
Best Journalistic Investigation		Our Money	24 Kanal	Nominee
