= Television News Service =

News division of the Ukrainian television network 1+1

TSN
- Trade name: Ukrainian: ТСН
- Native name: Ukrainian: Телевізійна Служба Новин
- News division of: 1+1
- News anchors: Marichka Padalko (since 2006); Sviatoslav Hrynchuk (since 2016); Lidiia Taran (since 2009); Nataliia Moseichuk (since 2006); Solomiia Vitvitska (since 2011); Alla Mazur (since 1997); Nataliia Ostrovska (since 2021)
- Founded: January 1, 1997; 29 years ago
- Headquarters: List: Suspilne Broadcast Center 42 Yuriia Illienka Street Kyiv 04119 (1997—2013); 1+1 Broadcast Center 23 Kyrylivska Street Kyiv 04080 (Since 2013)
- Area served: Worldwide
- Broadcast programs: TSN Evening News; TSN Morning; TSN Day; TSN Night; TSN 10 impressive stories
- Parent: 1+1 Media Group
- Website: List: TSN 1plus1.ua/tsn (Ukrainian) 1plus1.ua/ru/tsn (Russian); TSN Week 1plus1.ua/tsn-tizhden (Ukrainian) 1plus1.ua/ru/tsn-tizhden (Russian)
- Streaming news network: TSN Streaming Network

The TSN (Ukrainian: ТСН) or Television News Service (Телевізійна служба новин, romanized: Televiziina sluzhba novyn) is a Ukrainian daily news program of the 1+1 TV channel produced by 1+1 Media Group, broadcast from a television studio at the channel's headquarters in Podil, Kyiv since 2013. Before the Russian invasion of Ukraine, up to 8 TSN editions were broadcast on weekdays depending on the day of the week and one on Saturday and Sunday. TSN's main edition takes place at 7:30 p.m. From midnight on February 26, 2022, began on the informational TV channels 1+1 Media, in particular 1+1, started the broadcast of the television marathon United News, the creation of which was also joined by the TSN team.

TSN is one of the most popular news programs in Ukraine. In December 2012, the program had a record viewership, with 31.5% of Ukrainians watching the live program.

In addition to news releases, TSN also broadcasts the TV tabloid "TSN Special" and the Sunday analytical program "TSN Week".

== Overview ==
The program is broadcast live. The slogan of the program roughly translates to "TSN impresses" (Ukrainian: ТСН вражає, romanized: TSN vrazhaye).

Local news is one of TSN's most important businesses, with its own correspondents operating in each region of Ukraine (except Crimea) and beyond.

== Television programs ==
=== Morning issues of TSN ===
As part of the morning show "Breakfast with 1+1" on weekdays there are six issues of TSN, lasting 7–8 minutes every half hour between 7.00 and 9.30 a.m. The current hosts of the program are Marichka Padalko and Sviatoslav Hrynchuk.

=== TSN 12:00 ===
Broadcast every day at 12.00 a.m., it is a natural continuation of the morning broadcasts. It is distinguished by its dynamism and conciseness of news presentation. The duration of the issue is no more than 20 minutes.

=== TSN 14:00 ===
Additional daily broadcasts from August 31, 2020. Duration —15 minutes. Host — Solomiya Vitvitska.

=== TSN 16:45 ===
Additional daily broadcasts from 2016. The duration is 20–30 minutes. The program's current host is Solomiya Vitvitska.

=== TSN 19:30 ===
Released Monday to Saturday at 7:30 p.m. (on Sunday at this time airs "TSN Week"). The current hosts of the main issue are Lydia Taran and Natalia Moseychuk. From Monday to Wednesday it is aired for 60–65 minutes with a break for advertising, Thursday to Friday for 55 minutes with a break for advertising, and on Saturday for 45 minutes. Occasionally, shorter issues are broadcast, sometimes as brief as 30 minutes.

=== TSN Week ===
"TSN Week" is an analytical program, broadcast every Sunday between 7:30-9:00 p.m., interrupted by a 9-minute advertisement. The host is Alla Mazur.

TSN Week analyzes the most important events of the past week. Each issue has a so-called "top topic" in which journalists discuss the most significant current event. The program also includes a number of other stories on relevant topics and exclusive interviews with famous politicians.

The program constantly conducts its own journalistic investigations. In 2012, one of the investigations TSN Week conducted contributed to the release of the innocent convict Maksym Dmytrenko, who had served 8 years in prison for murders committed by a "childbirth maniac".

During the off-season issues, TSN Week is replaced by the usual main 45-minute issue of TSN.

=== TSN Night ===
Aired Monday through Thursday at 12:45 a.m. The hosts were Yulia Borysko and Solomiya Vitvitska. The program has since been discontinued. The last issue was released on March 19, 2020.

=== TSN 10 spectacular events of the day ===
This program debuted on 18 October 2021. It starts Monday through Wednesday at 10:50 p.m., and late Thursday night at 12:45 a.m. The current host is Natalia Ostrovskaya.

=== TSN on the Internet ===
TSN.ua is one of the most popular information resources on the Ukrainian Internet. In the fall of 2012, it became the leader among Ukrainian news sites. The audience coverage of tsn.ua amounted to 14.46%.

The news feed of tsn.ua is updated around the clock. The site also has analytical materials, Photo and Video sections, etc.

All TSN television programs can be viewed in a separate section. The site provides online broadcasts of TSN programs and the most popular programs of 1+1. The Sports section features online broadcasts of football matches of the Ukrainian Championship, Champions League and Europa League.

== See also ==
TSN.ua, the program's official website.
