= Serhiy Morozov (footballer, born 1950) =

Ukrainian footballer (1950–2021)

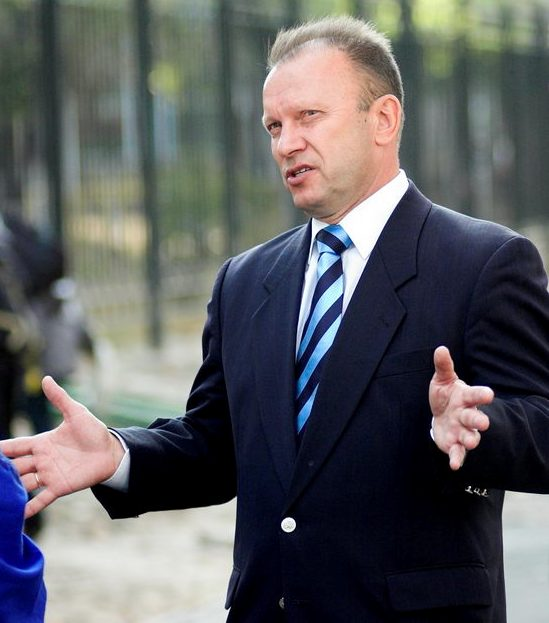
- photo of 2009

Personal information
- Full name: Serhiy Yuriyovych Morozov
- Date of birth: 30 April 1950
- Place of birth: Kyiv, Ukrainian SSR, Soviet Union
- Date of death: 22 October 2021 (aged 71)
- Place of death: Kyiv, Ukraine
- Position: Midfielder

Youth career
- 1964–1969: Dynamo Kyiv

Senior career*
Years	Team	Apps	(Gls)
1969	Lokomotyv Vinnytsia	27	(2)
1970	Desna Chernihiv	28	(0)
1971	Shakhtar Kadiivka		(2)
1971–1973	Zorya Voroshylovhrad	48	(5)
1974–1977	CSKA Moscow	95	(1)
1980–1981	Motor Hennigsdorf	20	(14)
1981–1984	Motor Nordhausen	60	(22)
1984–1985	Motor Ludwigsfelder FC		(30)

International career
1972	Soviet Union	1	(0)

Managerial career
- 1979–1980: CSKA Moscow (assistant)
- 1980–1985: Group of Soviet Forces in Germany
- 1985–1990: Iskra Smolensk
- 1991–1992: Dynamo-Gazovik Tyumen
- 1992–1993: Beijing Guoan
- 1993–1994: Shenyang Huayang
- 1995–1996: Nyva Vinnytsia
- 1997: Nisa Aşgabat
- 1998: CSKA Kyiv
- 1998–1999: Borysfen Boryspil
- 1999–2000: Prykarpattya Ivano-Frankivsk
- 2000–2001: Vorskla Poltava
- 2001–2002: Borysfen Boryspil
- 2005–2007: Dnipro Cherkasy
- * Club domestic league appearances and goals

Serhiy Yuriyovych Morozov (Ukrainian: Сергій Юрійович Морозов; 30 April 1950 – 22 October 2021) was a Soviet football player and a Ukrainian coach and football commentator.

== International career ==
Morozov played his only game for the USSR on 29 June 1972, in a friendly against Uruguay.

== Later life and death ==
Since 2008, he worked as football commentator at the Ukrainian sports channel Football 1.

Morozov died from complications of COVID-19 on 22 October 2021, amid the COVID-19 pandemic in Ukraine. He was 71.

== Honours ==
Zaria Voroshilovgrad

- Soviet Top League: 1972
