= Serhiy Shefir =

Ukrainian politician and film director

- Сергій Шефір
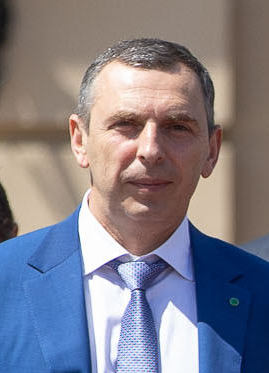
- Shefir in 2019

First Assistant to the President of Ukraine
- In office 21 May 2019 – 30 March 2024
- President: Volodymyr Zelenskyy

Personal details
- Born: 25 May 1964 (age 61) Kryvyi Rih, Ukrainian SSR, Soviet Union
- Citizenship: Ukraine
- Education: Kryvyi Rih National University
- Occupation: Film director; presidential advisor

Serhiy Nakhmanovych Shefir (Ukrainian: Сергій Нахманович Шефір; born 25 May 1964) is a Ukrainian politician and film director. He is the co-founder of Kvartal 95 Studio. From 25 May 2019 to 30 March 2024, he was the First Assistant to the President of Ukraine Volodymyr Zelenskyy. In September 2021, he survived an assassination attempt.

== Early life ==
Shefir was born on 25 May 1964 in Kryvyi Rih, and graduated from the Kryvyi Rih Mining Institute. He is Jewish.

Later, together with his brother Boris Shefir, he created scripts for KVN teams: "Minsk", "Makhachkala tramps", "Zaporizhzhia-Kryvyi Rih-Transit" (CIS Champion), "95th quarter", "XX century team", "XXI century team".

As a director, producer, and screenwriter, he participated in the "Kryvyi Rih Spaniard" and "Zaporizhzhia-Kryvyi Rih-Transit" teams.

== Film career ==
He was screenwriter and producer of more than a dozen films and series. The films Love in the Big City 3, Rzhevsky Versus Napoleon and 8 First Dates were included in the list of 10 highest-grossing films in the history of Ukraine, according to Strana.ua. The film "I'll be there" (Я буду рядом (фильм, 2012)) received the main prize of the Kinotavr festival.

Together with his brother Boris, he was the producer of the TV series Servant of the People and Matchmakers, which were recognized by VTsIOM as leaders in show ratings.

== First Assistant to the President of Ukraine ==
On 21 May 2019 he was appointed First Assistant to the 6th President of Ukraine, Volodymyr Zelenskyy. He was dismissed from this position on 30 March 2024, along with several other advisors and officials.

=== Assassination attempt ===
On 22 September 2021, at about 10:00 am Kyiv Time, near the village of Lisnyky in Kyiv Oblast, Shefir's car was fired upon. 18 bullets hit the car; the driver was wounded. Shefir himself was not injured.

The Prosecutor General of Ukraine, Iryna Venediktova, announced that proceedings had been launched with preliminary qualification under the article "attempted murder of two or more persons".

After the incident, Zelenskyy recorded a video message, saying that he did not know who was behind the assassination attempt on his first assistant, but promised a “strong response”.
