= Roman Bochkala =

Ukrainian war correspondent (born 1984)

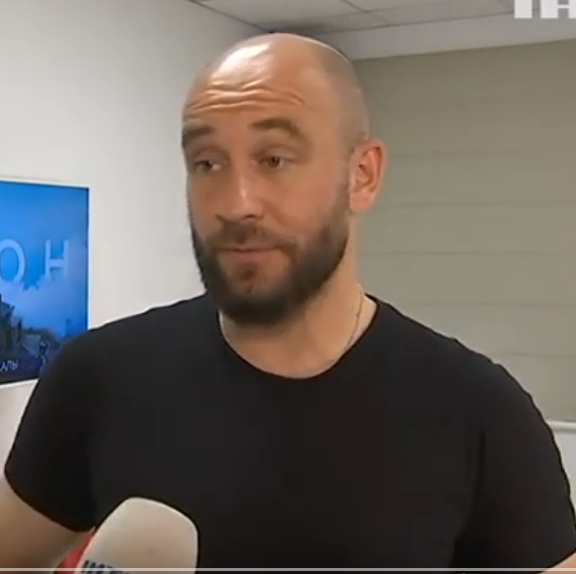
Bochkala in 2020

Roman Oleksandrovych Bochkala (Ukrainian: Роман Олександрович Бочкала; born 3 May 1984) is a Ukrainian journalist, volunteer, and military correspondent. Named Honored Journalist of Ukraine (2013), Bochkala is additionally a volunteer of the US Peace Corps in Ukraine. He was heavily wounded in 2014 near Luhansk during the start of Russo-Ukrainian war. In the summer of 2014, Bochkala managed to find the evidence of Russian troops directly fighting on the East of Ukraine against Ukrainian Armed Forces.

== Biography ==
Bochkaka is originally from Dzhankoi, Crimea, Ukraine. He has been engaged in journalism since the age of 17. At first he worked in a newspaper, then at the Ukraine’s 11th channel, and later at the Chornomorsk TV station.

In 2005, according to Bochkala, he was attacked, as a result of which he was put to sleep, beaten (triple fracture of the ankle, gutted knee, collarbone, broken ribs) and left unconscious in the snow. At that time, he was investigating the facts of the protection by the police of the drug trade and scrap metal collection points.

In 2007, he entered the Interschool, then in 2008 he moved to Kyiv and started working on the Inter TV channel.

As a correspondent, he covered military and civil conflicts in Iran, Afghanistan, Syria, Somalia, DR Congo, Kosovo, Lebanon, Rwanda, Liberia, Egypt, South Ossetia, Abkhazia, Jordan, Turkey.

Since 2014, he has covered the events of Ukraine's war with Russia in the east of the country. After the capture of Sloviansk in 2014, he went to the occupied territory, where he was detained by separatists and beaten. On July 8, 2014, near Luhansk, he was injured in the hand, while his military interlocutor, Dmytro Herasymchuk, died from a shrapnel wound to the head.

In April–May 2016, Bochkala completed an internship related to anti-corruption in the USA under the "Open the World" exchange program. In August 2016, he resigned from the Inter TV channel.

Since 2016, he has been participating in various programs as a military expert and correspondent, including on Apostrophe TV.

In 2020, he worked as the host of the political talk show "Peace or War" on the Inter TV channel.

From 2022, he is a military commentator on 24 Kanal.

In 2015, he co-founded the public organization "Stop Corruption" — an association of journalists, lawyers and concerned public activists, which conducts journalistic investigations and human rights activities with the aim of eliminating corrupt arbitrariness among officials, judges and politicians.

Twice, in 2016 and 2017, he was elected to the Council of Public Control under the National Anti-Corruption Bureau of Ukraine (NABU).

From 2016 to 2017, he was a member of the Kyiv commission of the General Prosecutor's Office of Ukraine for the selection of the management staff of local prosecutors.

Since 2015, he has been a co-founder and an active member of the Volunteer Battalion Charity Fund to help military personnel of the ATO. With the beginning of Russia's full-scale aggression against Ukraine in 2022, he participated in the collection of money for the purchase and transfer of military equipment and equipment for the Armed Forces of Ukraine, the provision of humanitarian aid to the civilian population in the war-affected regions of Ukraine.

== Honors ==
- Winner of the "Silver Feather" journalism competition (2006)
- Honorary title of Honored Journalist of Ukraine (2013)
- Gratitude of the Verkhovna Rada of Ukraine "For devoted work in the zone of anti-terrorist operation" (2014)
- Teletriumph Award in the category "Reporter" (2015)
