= Football 1 (Ukrainian TV channel) =

Football 1 Футбол 1
- Country: Ukraine
- Headquarters: Kyiv, Ukraine

Programming
- Languages: Ukrainian, Russian
- Picture format: 16:9 (576i, SDTV); 1080i, HDTV

Ownership
- Owner: Media Group Ukraine

History
- Launched: 18 November 2008
- Closed: 22 July 2022, 10:00 AM
- Former names: Football (Note: Ukrainian: Футбол) (18 November 2008 – December 2013)

Links
- Website: footballua.tv

Football 1 (Football until December 2013) was first specialized TV channel in Ukraine, dedicated exceptionally to football broadcasts. Football 1, Football 2 and Football 3 broadcast Ukrainian and European club competitions, international matches and other football events.

These channels belong to the Media Group Ukraine. A new channel Football 3 was launched on 1 February 2020. It ceased broadcasting on 22 July 2022, after Ukrainian oligarch Rinat Akhmetov had exited his media assets (Football 1 belongs to Media Group Ukraine holding).

== Coverage ==
Football TV Channel is available in packages of more than 500 cable operators all over Ukraine and on the satellite television platform Viasat. Technical coverage of the TV channel in cable networks exceeds 85% according to Gfk data.

== About the channel ==
The channel started broadcasting on 18 November 2008.

Football TV channel is the official broadcaster of the Ukrainian Premier League. Other national leagues which are broadcast include: England, Spain, Germany, France, Brazil; as well as national cup matches of Italy and England.

Oleksandr Denisov is the director of TV-channel, commentators are: Serhiy Panasyuk (until his death in 2015), Andriy Malynovskyi, Kyrylo Krutorogov, Viktor Vatsko, Oleksandr Myhaylyuk, Andriy Stoliarchuk, Roberto Morales.

Viktor Leonenko, Serhiy Morozov, Yozhef Sabo, Viktor Hrachov, Vadym Yevtushenko, Yevhen Levchenko, Oleksandr Sopko are invited experts of the channel.

== Awards ==
2009, 2010: The Best Sport Satellite Channel, an award of monthly Mediasat
