= Olena Frolyak =

Ukrainian journalist (born 1968)

- Олена Юріївна Фроляк
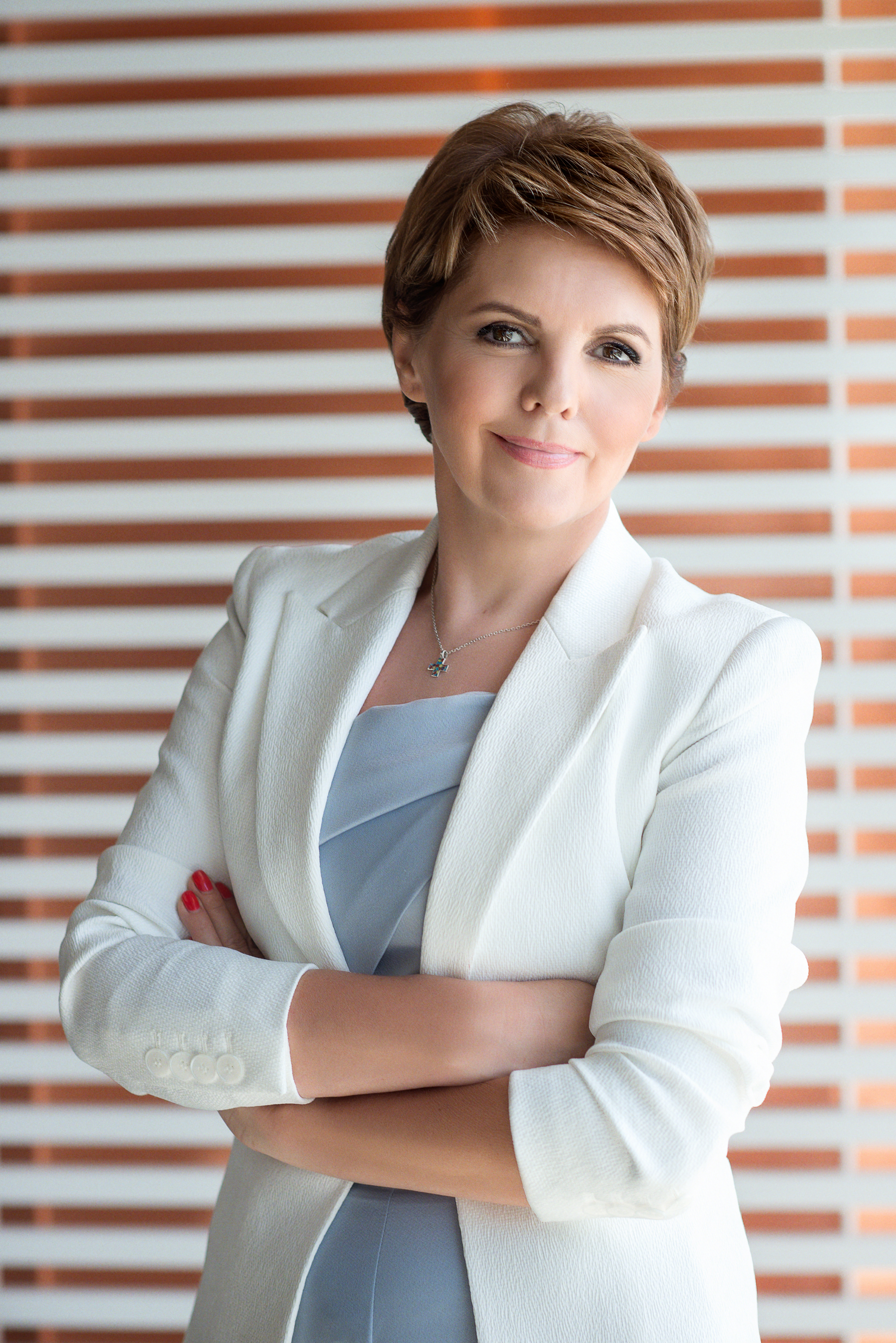
- Born: April 19, 1968 (age 58); Kazakh Soviet Socialist Republic, USSR
- Citizenship: Ukraine
- Awards: Honored Journalist of Ukraine; Order of Princess Olga; Teletriumph

Olynea Yurievna Frolyak is a Ukrainian television personality, journalist, and news broadcaster. She is most well-known in Ukraine as the editor-in-chief and host of the popular news show Facts, on ICTV. She is a multiple-time winner of the Teletriumph Award, the national television awards of Ukraine. She is also an Honored Journalist of Ukraine. The magazine Focus named her one of the most influential women in Ukraine.

== Early life ==
Olena Frolyak was born in the Zhovtnevy District of the Kostanay Region of the Kazakh Soviet Socialist Republic, often referred to as "the virgin lands," where her parents had been sent as part of the Soviet Union’s development campaigns, a Soviet state program requiring young professionals to serve in designated regions. Her father had graduated from the Chernivtsi Medical Institute and, upon assignment, relocated with his wife to this remote area.

According to Frolyak, the region had a harsh climate and agricultural landscape. One of her earliest recollections is of the blizzards during winter: “When I came home from kindergarten, I was frightened by the howling wind and would say, ‘Mom, quickly turn on the light!’” Another lasting impression was the sight of the roads covered in wheat rather than dust, as trucks hauled grain from the fields, and the wind scattered it from the open beds. Her family maintained a household farm, and her father’s profession as a doctor provided both respect and a sense of security.

When Froylak was 6 years old, the family moved back to her father's hometown, Kosov, in the Ivano-Frankivsk Oblast of the Ukrainian Soviet Socialist Republic. Upon arriving in Kosov, she was enrolled in kindergarten, where she encountered the Ukrainian language for the first time.

As a newcomer unfamiliar with the language, she was referred to by the pejorative term “Moskal,” a label that was emotionally difficult for her, even though she did not initially understand its meaning. Nevertheless, within a month, she had acquired basic Ukrainian, speaking with the distinctive intonation and vocabulary of the Hutsul dialect.

She attended music school at a young age in Kosov. Her early aspirations were influenced by her grandfather, who hoped she would become a pianist. On her first birthday, he gifted her a piano, and she later began studying music with great enthusiasm, initially dreaming of a career as a concert pianist. However, her music teacher eventually advised against this path.

While in high school, Frolyak was introduced to Lyudmila Gorodenko, the chief editor of the district newspaper Soviet Hutsulshchyna, with whom she formed a friendship. At 18 years old, in 1986, Frolyak joined the Soviet newspaper as a correspondent, and was trained directly by Gorodenko, who took Frolyak under her tutelage. She worked here as a correspondent in the department of letters until her graduation from university in 1992.

Froylak moved to Kyiv to attend the Institute of Journalism at the Taras Shevchenko National University of Kyiv (referred to informally as narvisik, a slang term for journalism institutes), where she graduated with a degree in journalism. During her university studies, Olena Frolyak completed a practical internship in Ivano-Frankivsk, where she began working with a local television station. Her first on-air report was a story about the city’s airport. Her enthusiasm for the city and commitment to the assignment earned her recognition and respect from the station’s experienced staff.

== Career in journalism ==
=== Regional and local television career ===
Following graduation in 1992, Olena Frolyak chose to return to her native Ivano-Frankivsk, unlike many of her peers who sought careers in Kyiv. At the time, local television in Ivano-Frankivsk was just beginning to develop, and Frolyak’s pre-diploma internship there became an important formative experience. Frolyak stayed and continued working in regional television in Ivano-Frankivsk, at the Ivano-Frankivsk City TV Center. She often had to commute to work by foot, or hop on a trolleybus. Over the course of three years, she gained broad experience across multiple roles, including reporter, anchor, and director. The work was exhausting for her, because she did not want to fill multiple roles simultaneously, but smaller regional channels often demanded that reporters take on extra responsibilities, far more than they would at national channels. However, she stayed in the field.

From 1994 to 1995, Frolyak served as editor-in-chief of Studio 3 in Ivano-Frankivsk. While in this role, she became the host of an editorial commentary talk show called Evenings in a Live Broadcast.

In 1995, Frolyak became the head of the information department of Internews Ukraine, but she left before the year was out.

=== Internship with the BBC ===
While working in regional television in Ivano-Frankivsk, Olena Frolyak had a formative encounter that would shape the trajectory of her career. At the time, the local television station where she was employed received support from international media development programs. One such initiative brought Tony Thatcher, a former producer from the British Broadcasting Corporation (BBC), to Ivano-Frankivsk to assist in modernizing and expanding the station’s programming. Frolyak, fluent in English at this point, served as Thatcher’s translator throughout his stay.

Thatcher extended an invitation to Frolyak for a private BBC internship in London, at the BBC's former headquarters building. During her time in London, she was introduced to senior figures at the BBC, gaining firsthand insight into global broadcasting standards and ethics. Among the advice that left a lasting impression on her were key tenets of professional journalism: "always contact your interview subject in advance, even if only by phone, and take full responsibility for every word spoken on air." Frolyak has cited this early exposure to the BBC’s journalistic rigor as an enduring influence on her career.

=== Entry into national television ===
Frolyak's future plans of working in British television were interrupted when she received an unexpected message from her former journalism school classmate and fellow Ivano-Frankivsk native, Mykola Kniazhytskyi, a journalist and television executive. He had tracked her down while attending a conference in London. He informed her that a new American-backed television project was being launched in Kyiv and that the producers were seeking a fresh, competent face for the role of presenter. Knyazhytskyi encouraged Frolyak to return to Ukraine and take part in a competitive casting process. He was involved in launching a new television project in Kyiv called Windows–News on the UT-2 channel, part of the STB network, and invited Frolyak to audition as a presenter.

Upon arrival in Kyiv, Frolyak underwent a dramatic transformation in preparation for the audition. Stylists shortened her long, wavy hair into a modern cropped style, dyed it black, and removed all traces of her usual makeup. She later recalled being so shocked by her new appearance that she nearly cried upon seeing herself in the mirror. Nonetheless, the styling was strategic: her previous aesthetic, while familiar, was considered "too mature" for the role. The aim was to present her as a modern, dynamic face suited for the evolving Ukrainian media landscape.

=== Workplace romance turned into marriage ===
Around this time, she came into contact again with a man she'd briefly met only once before, Sergey Soloviov, during a broadcast production. According to Frolyak, their first meeting left a strong impression. Soloviov, a cameraman at STB, remarked on her commanding presence on screen and her assertive delivery, which he said felt as if she were addressing all of Ukraine. Later, Frolyak had planned a vacation to Israel to visit a friend, but just before leaving, she encountered Sergey Soloviov for a third time at the office, and they got into another conversation. When she returned from the trip, the two crossed paths once more, and Soloviov joked that the cost of her journey could have been better spent on a bottle of red wine they might have enjoyed together in Kyiv. This remark prompted Frolyak to reflect on the nature of their connection. The very next day, they met again by chance in an elevator, where she prompted him to speak his mind. Soloviov said that he liked red wine, and suggested they meet over dinner. They went on their first date, and it went well. Their relationship developed quickly from that point.

On March 27, 1997, Olena Frolyak married Serhiy Solovyov. At the time of their wedding, Frolyak was 29 years old, had already established herself professionally, and had a clear vision for both her career and personal life. The couple submitted their marriage application a month in advance, and the ceremony was organized modestly and in accordance with tradition.

1996 had been a difficult period for Frolyak: her father had died, her mother was alone, and her brother was still in school. Similarly, Serhiy’s parents were aging. The wedding was therefore kept intimate and simple, with only around 30 close family members and friends in attendance. The couple used all their savings for the celebration and chose not to exchange wedding gifts. Frolyak wore a Ukrainian-designed wedding suit originally created for the visit of a foreign monarch, which she was able to rent for $150.

The wedding followed a local traditional format: the couple was symbolically “sold” and “redeemed,” guests attempted playful rituals like the symbolic “bride theft,” and the overall atmosphere was lighthearted and familial. Given the modest means with which they began their life together, the couple received practical gifts essential for starting a household, including a refrigerator, vacuum cleaner, kitchenware, a coffee maker, and monetary contributions. The gifts were more attuned the couple’s real needs, rather than luxury items such as jewelry. The couple did not go on a honeymoon due to the challenging economic circumstances of the time. Instead, they resumed their daily routines immediately: enjoying coffee together, organizing gifts and flowers, and returning to work the next day, Serhiy to his job as a cameraman, and Olena to prepare for her evening television broadcast.

In 1998, Frolyak gave birth to her first child, a daughter named Natalia. She had to rent an apartment for a long time, even with both incomes coming in, the couple could not afford a home.

=== Facts and career at ICTV ===
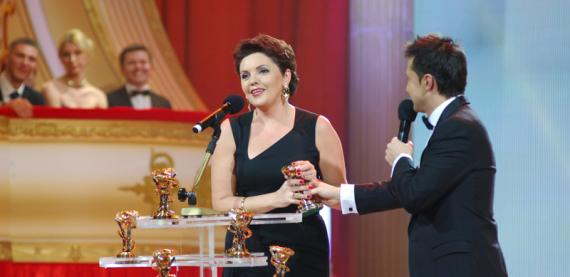
Elena Frolyak (left) and Volodymyr Zelenskyy (right) at Teletriumph 2011, the national television awards of Ukraine.

In 2000, she moved to the newly forming team at ICTV at the invitation of Mykola Kniazhytskyi, who was setting up the team. Her husband came with her, and became a cameraman at ICTV. Other people that Mykola brought over to ICTV at this time include Oksana Sokolova, among others. The move was paralleled with broader transformations in Ukraine’s media landscape, which only several years after the Dissolution of the Soviet Union was just beginning to adopt more rigorous standards of news reporting and expanding its reach across the country. The ICTV newsroom featured an open studio design that was unparalleled in the post-Soviet media landscape at the time. The bold orange color scheme and modern presentation stood out in her mind, and later recounted to journalists thinking at the time that it symbolized and represented a fresh approach to television news.

In September 2000, Olena Frolyak first appeared on air as the anchor of the newly launched news program Facts on ICTV. Her first live broadcast was a midday edition scheduled for 12:00 p.m. Despite arriving in the capital with strong credentials, including a university degree and internships at both CNN and the BBC, she found herself overwhelmed. "I was so anxious I couldn’t even smile at the end, the muscles in my face just locked up," she later recalled. The professional makeup and hairstyle arranged by Kyiv stylists also left her dissatisfied, adding to her distress. Nevertheless, she composed herself and persevered. Her late father, watching from Kosovo, stood throughout the entire broadcast, filled with pride. "I have no right to make a mistake," Frolyak said.

The program quickly established itself as one of the most prominent and influential information broadcasts in Ukraine. Frolyak became one of its most recognizable faces. ICTV was a major income raise for Frolyak and her husband, and in 2000, they were finally able to purchase 8 acres of land for what she called "ridiculous money," where they began building a home which they moved into before the end of the year.

In 2001, Frolyak was interviewed by a newspaper about raising a child in the new millennium, and she said:

"I will have to raise my daughter for a long time, but I know exactly what I want. I want Natalia to love books and sports, listen to Sting and understand Rachmaninov, dress stylishly, but not be an "acidic" fashionista, maybe be a housewife, but with the philosophy that "borscht for dinner is not the most important thing in life", be confident in herself, but not arrogant. I want her to impress with her mind, heart and beauty. And the most important thing she will receive from her father and mother is our love."

Just one year after joining Facts, in 2001, Frolyak was appointed head of ICTV's information service. Despite assuming greater managerial responsibilities, she continued to serve as the anchor of Facts, maintaining her dual role as both journalist and newsroom leader. Under her stewardship, the program developed a reputation for credibility and professionalism, and Frolyak herself became known as a consistent and authoritative presence in Ukrainian broadcast journalism.

In her formative years as a television journalist, Frolyak studied under prominent Russian journalist Dmitry Kiselyov. She credits Kiselyov with teaching her precision in language and a deep sense of responsibility for words spoken on air. Frolyak described him as an intellectual who inspired journalists to engage seriously with their profession. Kiselyov’s influence remained with her even after he returned to Moscow, where he continued his career and personal life, becoming a father again while his older children grew up.

Frolyak does not deny that she was considered conventionally attractive to most of the men who watched her on television, or that this might have influenced her rise. Over time, the editorial team of the ICTV news program Facts gradually shifted from a male-dominated environment to one composed mostly of women. Although she preferred a more balanced team dynamic, by 2010, the newsroom comprised approximately 80% women. Young men entering journalism were often enthusiastic and passionate but sometimes lacked the assertiveness to remain in the field. She noted the importance of partnership-based relationships in the workplace rather than rigid hierarchical control, stating that she seeks to resolve issues collaboratively rather than through imposed authority.

=== Presidential debate moderator ===
On April 18, 2019, to celebrate her 51st birthday, Froylak planned to travel to Lake Como for a vacation, and had flights booked from the airport in Kyiv. While en route to the airport, she received a call from ICTV executive Oleksandr Bohutsky and subsequently from businessman Viktor Pinchuk, informing her she was invited to moderate the 2019 Ukrainian presidential election debates between Volodymyr Zelenskyy and Petro Poroshenko at the Kyiv Olympic Sports Complex, scheduled to occur on April 19th. Frolyak looked at her phone, and realized that she couldn't refuse: Pinchuk had called her directly. At the same time, she also realized that this was a once-in-a-lifetime experience, and immediately returned to the office in order to fulfill the request, stating later that she would have accepted regardless of which campaign extended the invitation.

The other moderator of the debate was her former coworker at ICTV, Andriy Kulykov, who had recently left the station to work in public broadcast radio. Frolyak lacked a timer after her phone lost power from a flood of birthday messages. She ultimately used a spare phone lent to her by Dmytro Razumkov to keep time. Despite the pressure, she successfully completed the broadcast, later recalling the experience as intensely stressful and almost surreal. At the end of the debate, Zelenskyy publicly wished her a happy birthday, and led the entire stadium crowd to join in singing Mnohaya lita (the Ukrainian version of Happy Birthday) to Frolyak.

== UN Ambassador for environmental issues ==
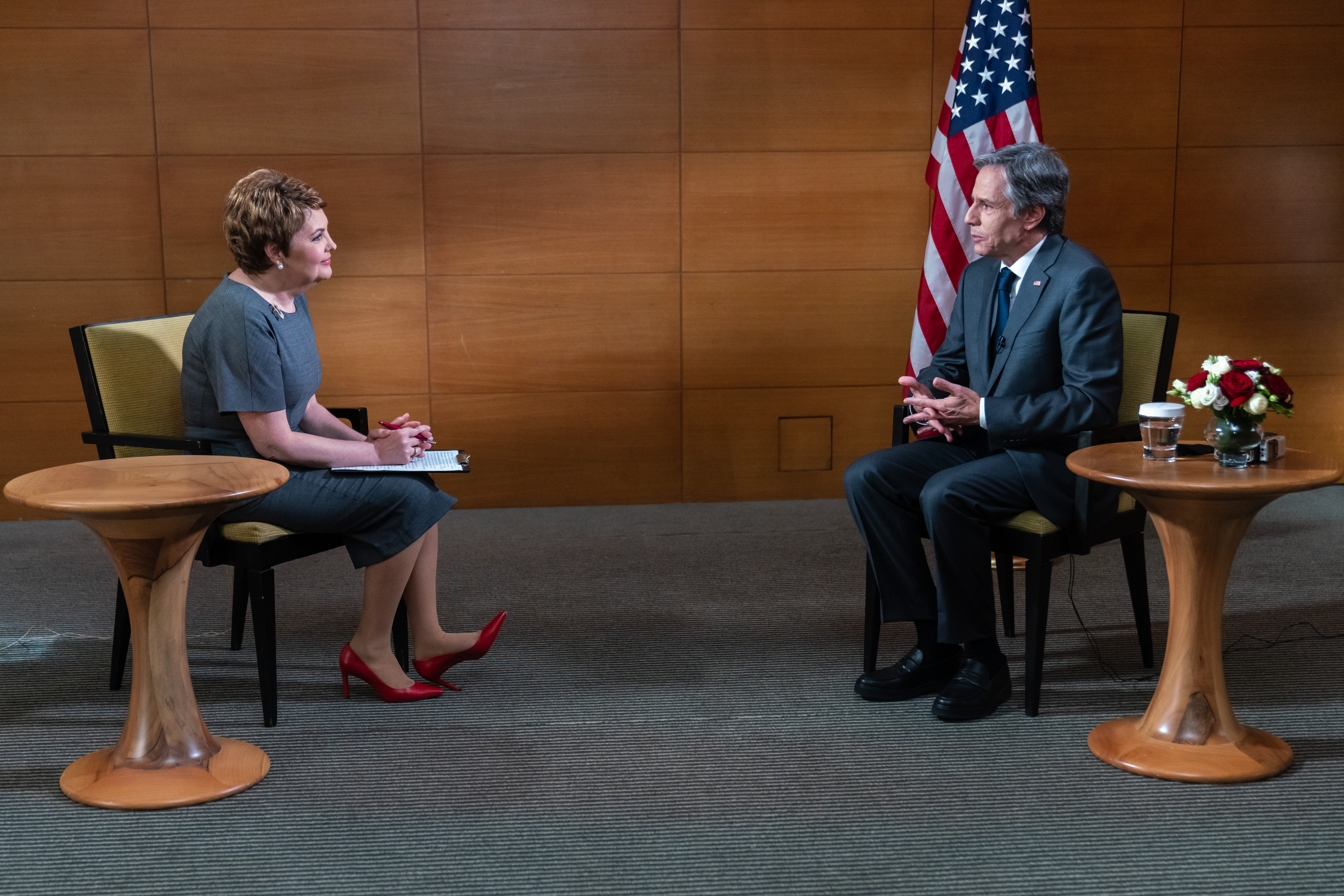
Olena Frolyak interviews the United States Secretary of State Antony J. Blinken on ICTV, in Kyiv. 2021.

On April 27, 2021, Frolyak became the first UN Ambassador for environmental issues appointed by the UN Global Compact Network in Ukraine. She signed a memorandum of cooperation with the organization and a formal commitment to advancing environmental protection and the implementation of sustainable technologies. As ambassador, Frolyak focused on supporting the UN Sustainable Development Goals (SDGs), particularly in the areas of climate change awareness, eco-technology, and environmental journalism. Frolyak insisted that the appointment would not interfere with her main journalistic duties, though it added a new line of responsibility to her well-organized schedule.

Traveling across Northern Europe with a camera crew, Frolyak aimed to show Ukrainian audiences how sustainable lifestyles can be achieved. She tried to highlight examples such as Stockholm’s use of biogas-powered public transport and called for increased environmental responsibility within Ukraine. She also referenced research from Harvard University, shared by the UN, linking global pandemics to environmental degradation, reinforcing the urgency of ecological reform.

== Post-2022 ==
On February 24, 2022, when Russia invaded Ukraine, Froylak's senior editor called her on the phone in a trembling voice and said two words in Ukrainian: "Lenka, it's started." Frolyak went to visit her mother near Kyiv. There, she met with her family and they agreed on a course of action: her brother would evacuate the children to western Ukraine in the Carpathian region, her husband would join the Territorial Defense Forces, and the women would remain. On Saturday morning, strong explosions were heard near her home in Vasylkiv, just south of Kyiv. She also described her entire house shaking "like the house was walking about." Frolyak quickly got behind the wheel of her car and evacuated with her mother, a friend, and their dog, leaving behind her son’s jacket and many belongings, heading toward the Ivano-Frankivsk region. Her husband remained in Kyiv. The journey took 36 hours, and after arriving, she began to feel conflicted about having left the capital.

One month later, Frolyak returned to Kyiv. Frolyak chose not to inform her husband of her return in advance, knowing he would object out of concern for her safety. Maintaining their daily morning phone calls, she concealed her location during the drive. Upon reaching Kyiv and parking near ICTV’s headquarters on Pankivska Street, she staged a surprise reunion, pretending to have sent supplies with volunteers. Her husband, who at this point was serving as ICTV's chief cameraman, initially failed to recognize her car due to its Ivano-Frankivsk license plates. He got an emotional surprise when Frolyak revealing herself, much to her husband's astonishment and joy. Reflecting on the moment, she described her profound relief and happiness at returning home, even expressing affection for the walls of her Kyiv apartment.

Her daughter started leading volunteering efforts. She started leading teams of young people to dismantle homes destroyed by bombs in the Chernihiv region. In the evenings, they would have disco nights, and would repeat the process the next day.

At the initiative of Volodymyr Zelenskyy, Facts joined the Telemarathon network of networks, which the majority of the Ukrainian population supported at the time. However, some people in Ukraine have recently called Telemarathon nothing more than an institution of the state, and its viewership has steadily declined without any consenting voices seen on the station. Froylak has expressed her own worry that the image of both ICTV and Facts has been tarnished, after decades of building up a trustworthy brand with the Ukrainian population. She said:

"Yes, of course, I don't like everything, I would like the authorities to speak to people more honestly, and talk to us as adults. But on the other hand, we have one enemy — Russia, and although this does not mean that the authorities cannot be criticized — let's win first."

On June 18, 2024, Frolyak led was a part of a blood donation campaign for the Ukrainian Ministry of Defense called "Donation: Priceless." She said:

“Every day we make use of many opportunities: we go about our daily routines, we work, we rest, we walk in the park. Ultimately, each day we are given the most important opportunity — to live fully. We owe this to our defenders, to those who, for the third year in a row, are securing our tomorrow. There are also many patients who constantly need blood. Donating is the simplest and smallest thing we can do for them.”
