= Vitalii Linetskyi =

Ukrainian actor

Vitaly Borisovich Linetsky (October 22, 1971 – July 16, 2014) was a Ukrainian theater and film actor, Honored Artist of Ukraine (2004).

== Biography ==
Born on October 22, 1971, in Ivano-Frankivsk. Graduated from the Kyiv National University of Theatre, Film and Television named after Karpenko-Kary. He served as an actor in the Ivano-Frankivsk Ukrainian Drama Theatre, the Kyiv Youth Theater and the Kyiv Academic Drama and Comedy Theater on the left bank of the Dnipro. Twice winner of the professional theater award "Kyiv Pectoral": in 1998 – in the nomination "Best Actor in a Supporting Role" for the role of Senor Meis in the play "A Little Wine ... or 70 Revolutions" based on novels by L. Pirandello, in 2007 – in the nomination " Best Actor in the First Plan" for the role of Yegor Voynitsky in the play "26 Rooms ..." based on A. Chekhov's play "Leshy".

Actively acted in films.

He died at six o'clock in the morning on July 16, 2014, in Kyiv. The director of the Theater on the Left Bank, Alexander Gannochenko, said that the actor fell and hit his head. The same version was confirmed by journalist Maxim Ravreba: "Two days ago, he was last seen at Kurenivka. Then the wife was called for identification. Vitaly was found dead in an underground passage along Teligi Street, near St. Cyril's Church. Or killed, or fell from a great height onto concrete steps. But it was an unnatural death." A criminal case was opened on the fact of the death of the actor, but no signs of violent death were found on his body: "A witness, a saleswoman at a round-the-clock stall, saw a man on July 16 at six in the morning sit down on the parapet that encloses the stairs to the underground passage and accidentally fall down, rolling down the stairs. The fact that the man was alone at that time was also recorded by a video camera installed nearby. Farewell to V. B. Linetsky took place on 21 at the Theater on the Left Bank. The actor is buried at the Berkovets cemetery.

== Theatrical work ==
=== Kyiv Academic Theatre of Drama and Comedy on the left bank of Dnieper ===
- 1995 – "The Invincible Sword Guyana" based on the fairy tale by T. Gabbe "City of Masters" – Moucheron the Younger 1995 – "The Sorceress" by I. Karpenko-Kary – Demyan
- 1995 – "Anything, or Twelfth Night" by W. Shakespeare – Feste / Death
- 1996 – "Fool" M. Ashara – Miguel Ostos
- 1996 – "Comedy about the charm of sin" based on the play by N. Machiavelli "Mandrake"; dir. Yuri Lonely – Ligurio
- 1996 – "A little wine ... or 70 turns" based on short stories by L. Pirandello – Senor Meis
- 1997 – "Small demon" F. Sologub; dir. Yuri Lonely – Pavlusha Volodin
- 1997 – "Deceived" T. Manna – doctor
- 1998 – "The Moor of Venice" ("Othello") by W. Shakespeare – Iago
- 1998 – "Philoctetes-concert" according to Sophocles – Neoptolem
- 1999 – "So the summer ended ..." based on the novel by I. Shaw "Lucy Crown" – Jeff
- 2000 – "The Death of Tarelkin" by A. Sukhovo-Kobylin – Rasplyuev, Krestyan Krestyanovich
- 2001 – "Who is afraid? .." based on the play by E. Albee – Nick
- 2003 – "Sea, night, candles" based on the play by Y. Bar-Yosef "This is a great sea" – Noah Greenwald
- 2006 – "26 rooms ..." based on the play by A. Chekhov "Leshy" – Egor Petrovich Voynitsky
- 2006 – "My dears! .." based on the works of F. Dostoevsky and A. Volodin – Kerilashvili / Svidrigailov
- 2008 – "Let him not love two at once ..." based on the play by M. Staritsky "Oh, don't go, Gritsu ..." – Khoma
- 2012 – "Carnival of the Flesh" based on the play by G. Buchner "Woyzeck" – Woyzeck
- 2014 – "Fun from the heart, or a cap with crucians" based on the stories of Y. Koval; dir. Dmitry Bogomazov — Author

=== Theater "Free Stage" ===
2003 – "Roberto Zucco" B.-M. Coltesa – Roberto Zucco

=== Center for theatrical arts. Lesya Kurbasa ===
2006 – "Notes of a Madman" by N. Gogol – Aksenty Ivanovich Poprishchin

== Filmography ==
- 1992 – Melodrama with attempted murder
- 1992 – Dandelion Blossom – episode
- 1999 – Bourgeois's birthday – Oleg Pozharsky
- 2001 – Birthday of Bourgeois-2 – Oleg Pozharsky
- 2001 – Trail of the werewolf
- 2001 – Evenings on a farm near Dikanka – Dyak
- 2002 – Gold Rush
- 2002 – Cinderella – Doctor
- 2003 – Crazy Day or The Marriage of Figaro – Basil
- 2004 – Coffeeman
- 2004 – Guide
- 2005 – Second Front
- 2005 – Special Purpose Girlfriend
- 2005 – Stolen happiness
- 2005 – Barbie's wedding
- 2006 – Happy People
- 2006 – Three nights (Lawyer)
- 2007 – I love you to death
- 2007 – Extraterrestrial – ufologist
- 2007 – Curator
- 2007 – If you hear me
- 2007 – Presumption of guilt
- 2007 – Thirst for extreme
- 2007 – Kill the snake
- 2008 – Illusion of fear
- 2008 – Detachment
- 2008 – Climber
- 2008 – Casting
- 2008 – Genius of empty space
- 2008 – Subscriber is temporarily unavailable
- 2009 – Governess – Alexei, Nina's former friend
- 2009 – Little Red Riding Hood – Storyteller, Brother Grimm
- 2009 – Razluchnitsa – Zhora, doctor, colleague and friend of Valery
- 2009 – To hell with two – bandit
- 2009 – The third is not given
- 2009 – Good reason for murder
- 2009 – Witching love-2
- 2010 – Brother for brother
- 2010 – The True Story of Scarlet Sails – Sincrite
- 2010 – Do you play chess?
- 2010 – I won't give you to anyone
- 2011 – Lovers in Kyiv (short story "Something") – Ivan
- 2011 – Kostoprav – Valentin Lvovich Fishman, plastic surgeon
- 2011 – The one who went through the fire – Stepan Shulika
- 2012 – Eternal return – He
- 2012 – Odesa-mother – Elagin, police captain
- 2014 – Migratory birds – Mikhail Vitalievich Serov, doctor
- 2014 – Crime in focus – Vadim Brigov, investigator
- 2015 – Battle for Sevastopol – KMB Major
- 2016 – Turtle Dove's Nest – Dmitry
