= Nataliia Moseichuk =

Ukrainian journalist (born 1973)

- Наталія Мосейчук
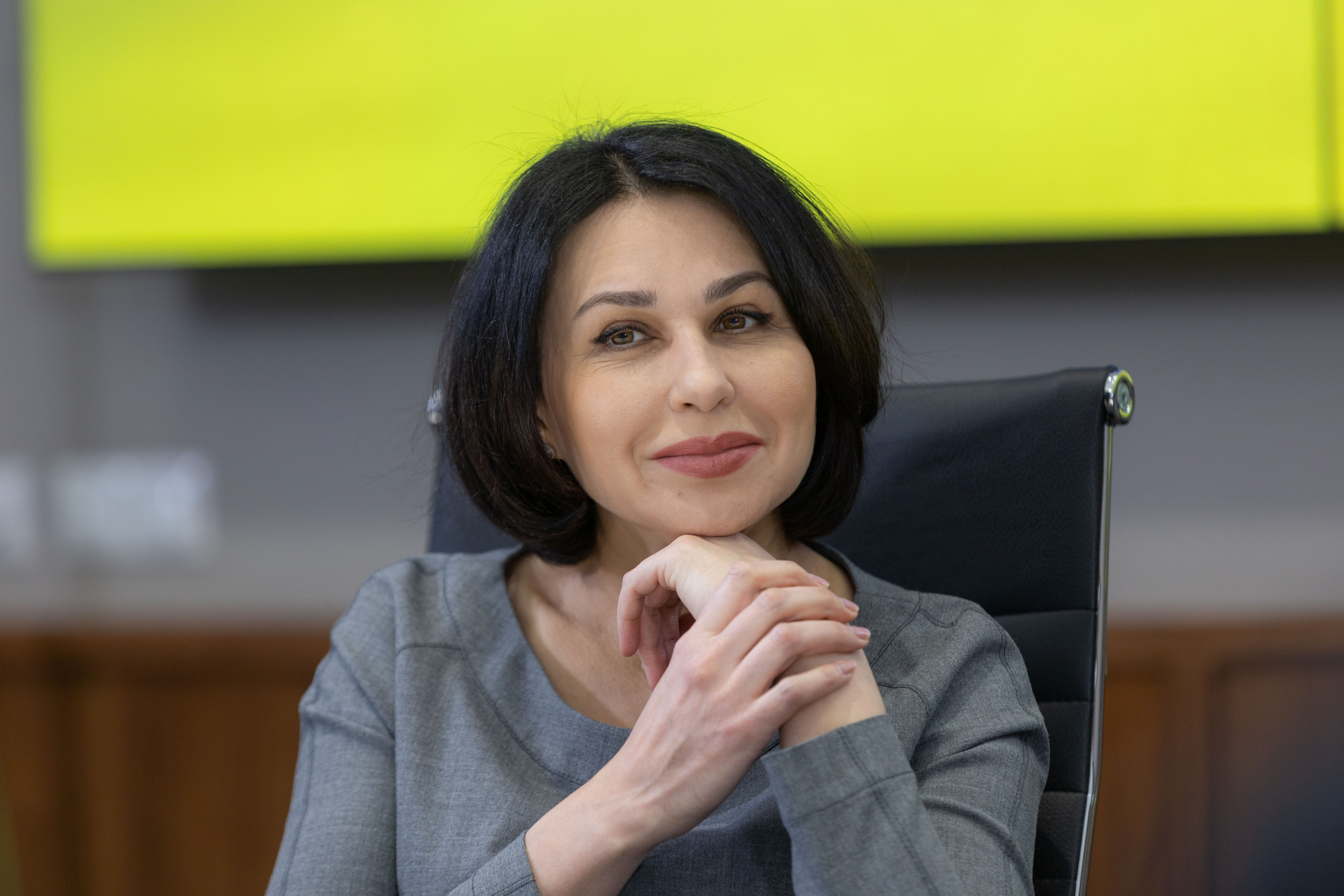
- Born: Nataliia Mykolaivna Moseichuk; 30 May 1973 (age 52); Tejen, Mary Region, Turkmen SSR, Soviet Union
- Occupation: Journalist
- Years active: 1993—present

Nataliia Mykolaivna Moseichuk (Ukrainian: Наталія Миколаївна Мосейчук, pronounced [nɐˈtɑl⁽ʲ⁾ijɐ mɪkoˈlɑjiu̯nɐ mosejˈtʃuk]; born May 30, 1973) is a Ukrainian journalist, host of the 1+1 talk show Right to Power, and curator of the social projects Right to Education, School of Superheroes, and the Global Teacher Prize Ukraine.

== Early life and education ==
Moseichuk was born on 30 May 1973, in Tejen, Mary Region, Turkmen SSR to a soldier and a teacher. In 1990, she attended high school in Berdychiv, Zhytomyr Oblast and in 1995 finished her degree at the Faculty of Foreign Languages at Zhytomyr Pedagogical University.

== Career ==
Moseichuk began working as a journalist and presenter on Zhytomyr Regional Television in 1993 and hosted Morning Review on Inter in 1997. She then worked as a news anchor for Utar and Express-Inform in 1998 and 1999, respectively. In 2003, she was the host and writer of VIP-woman on 5 Kanal and in 2006 switched to 1+1 to host Television Service of News (TSN). She also wrote and hosted Hidden Life, which explored the public and non-public aspects of politicians' lives. In October 2016, she and Sergei Ivanov became co-hosts of the talk show Right to Power. She continues to host TNS on 1+1.

After Moseichuk left 5 Kanal, producer YuriI Stets said that he believed that her reason was "not a desire to earn more... [or] to actually leave 5 Kanal" but because she wanted to work for 1+1. She later said in an interview with Lviv Portal that she left after several staff, including her "teacher and friend" Roman Skrypin, were dismissed. She also said the channel had noticeably changed in its delivery of news.

=== Charity work ===
In 2017, Moseichuk became the curator of the Right to Education movement, which strives to introduce quality schooling to all children's hospitals. She also curates the School of Superheroes, which began in August 2020 in the oncology department of the Kherson Children's Regional Clinical Hospital, followed by a School of Superheroes for Children at KP Dnipropetrovsk Regional Clinical Treatment and Prevention Association in Dnipro. The third school opened in Okhmatdyt. As of 2022, there are eight Superhero Schools in Ukraine: three classes and a library at the Okhmatdyt National Hospital in Kyiv, two in Dnipro, and one each in Zhytomyr and Kherson. A school has also been opened at the cremation center in Kyiv.

In 2021, Moseichuk curated the Global Teacher Prize Ukraine. First place was awarded to a teacher at a hospital school and second place went to a teacher or volunteer teaching children at the front lines.

Moseichuk has used her platform as a journalist to help raise money, particularly for children. In 2017, she held a fundraising campaign for Yuri Sinitsa, who needed a kidney transplant; €60,000 was raised. In 2018, she raised ₴650,000 at a charity marathon to open a Superhero School class in the Intensive and Efferent Therapy Department for Acute Intoxication at Okhmatdyt National Children's Clinic in Kyiv. The funds were used for repairs, equipment, and teachers' salaries. In 2020, she spoke to President Volodymyr Zelenskyy on Right to Power about the COVID-19 death of two parents and encouraged him to support medical workers in any way possible.

== Honours and awards ==
- 2006: Laureate, Woman of the III Millennium, an all-Ukrainian award, in the category "Rating"
- 2011: One of Ukraine's 20 most successful TV presenters (Focus)
- 2011: One of Ukraine's 100 most influential women (Focus)
- 2013: Teletriumph Award in the category "Leader / host of information program".
- 2018: Teletriumph Award in the category "Leader / host of information program".
- 2021: One of Ukraine's top 100 successful women (New Voice of Ukraine)
- Journalist of the Year in the field of electronic media

== Personal life ==
Moseichuk is married and has two children.
