= Tamara Yatsenko =

Ukrainian actress

- Тама́ра Яце́нко
- Born: August 19, 1955 (age 71); Horenka, Bucha Raion, Kyiv Oblast, Ukrainian Soviet Socialist Republic
- Education: Ivan Franko National Academic Drama Theater; Russian Institute of Theatre Arts
- Occupation: Actress
- Honours: People's Artist of Ukraine

Tamara Oleksandrivna Yatsenko (Ukrainian: Тама́ра Олекса́ндрівна Яце́нко; born August 19, 1955) is a Ukrainian theater, film and television actress. She holds the title People's Artist of Ukraine.

== Biography ==
Tamara Oleksandrivna Yatsenko was born on August 19, 1955, in the village of Horenka, located in Kyiv Oblast. She graduated from the Kyiv theatre studio at Ivan Franko National Academic Drama Theater in 1975. Since 1979, she acted in the Kyiv National Academic Molodyy Theatre. She graduated from the Russian Institute of Theatre Arts in 1990.

In addition to theater acting, Yatsenko also acted in films and television shows. She was also a voice actress for dubs of The Little Mermaid (1989) and Despicable Me (2010).

== Awards and honors ==
In 1982, 1983 and 2003, Tatsenko earned the Debut Award at a festival in Sumy, the Boychenka Award and the M. Starytskyi Literary and Art Award respectively for her role as Pronya Prokopivna in the play Chasing Two Hares (Ukrainian: За двома зайцями). In 1993, she earned the title People's Artist of Ukraine. In 2007, she earned a Kyiv Pectoral award for her role as Madame Aleksandrovna in the play Golubka (Ukrainian: Голубка).
