= Lidiya Taran =

Ukrainian television presenter

- Born: September 19, 1977 (age 48); Kyiv, Ukraine
- Occupation: television presenter
- Children: 1

Lidiya Anatoliyivna Taran (Ukrainian: Лідія Анатоліївна Таран, born September 19, 1977) is a Ukrainian television presenter. She speaks English.

== Early life ==
Taran was born on September 19, 1977, in Kyiv. She was part of a family of journalists. She did not like journalism during her childhood because she rarely saw her parents, who were frequently busy and away due to work. During school, she was bored because her classes were too easy for her. She frequently skipped classes to read in the library. She spent the last two years of school at the Ukrainian Humanities Lyceum. After graduating from the lyceum, she applied to enter the Institute of International Relations at the Taras Shevchenko National University of Kyiv, but was rejected. She then applied to the Institute of Journalism, where she was accepted.

== Career ==
She began her journalistic career in radio, but television has made her a real star. In addition to her main profession, Taran is also successfully engaged in her social project, "To Realize a Dream", whose goal is to realize the dreams of seriously ill children in Ukraine.

- 1994–1995 – host of information and entertainment programs of radio "Promin", "Dovira".
- 1995–1998 – Editor and presenter of programs on several radio stations.
- 1998–2004 – presenter on the New Channel (Reporter, Sport Reporter, Rise, Goal)
- 2005–2009 – presenter on Channel 5 (News Time)
- since 2009 – presenter on the channel "1 + 1" ( "I love Ukraine", "Breakfast with 1 + 1", "TSN" ) and 2 + 2 (" ProFootball ")

Taran also participated in the third season of the project "I Dance for You".

Taran was the voice actress for Griselda the Grievous in the Ukrainian dub for the film How to Train Your Dragon: The Hidden World (2019).

== Awards and honors ==
In 2003, Taran became the first woman to win a Teletriumph Award in the "Sports commentator" category.

== Personal life ==
Until August 2010, Taran lived with the presenter Andriy Domanskyi, with whom she has a daughter Vasilyna.
