= Alla Mazur =

Ukrainian journalist

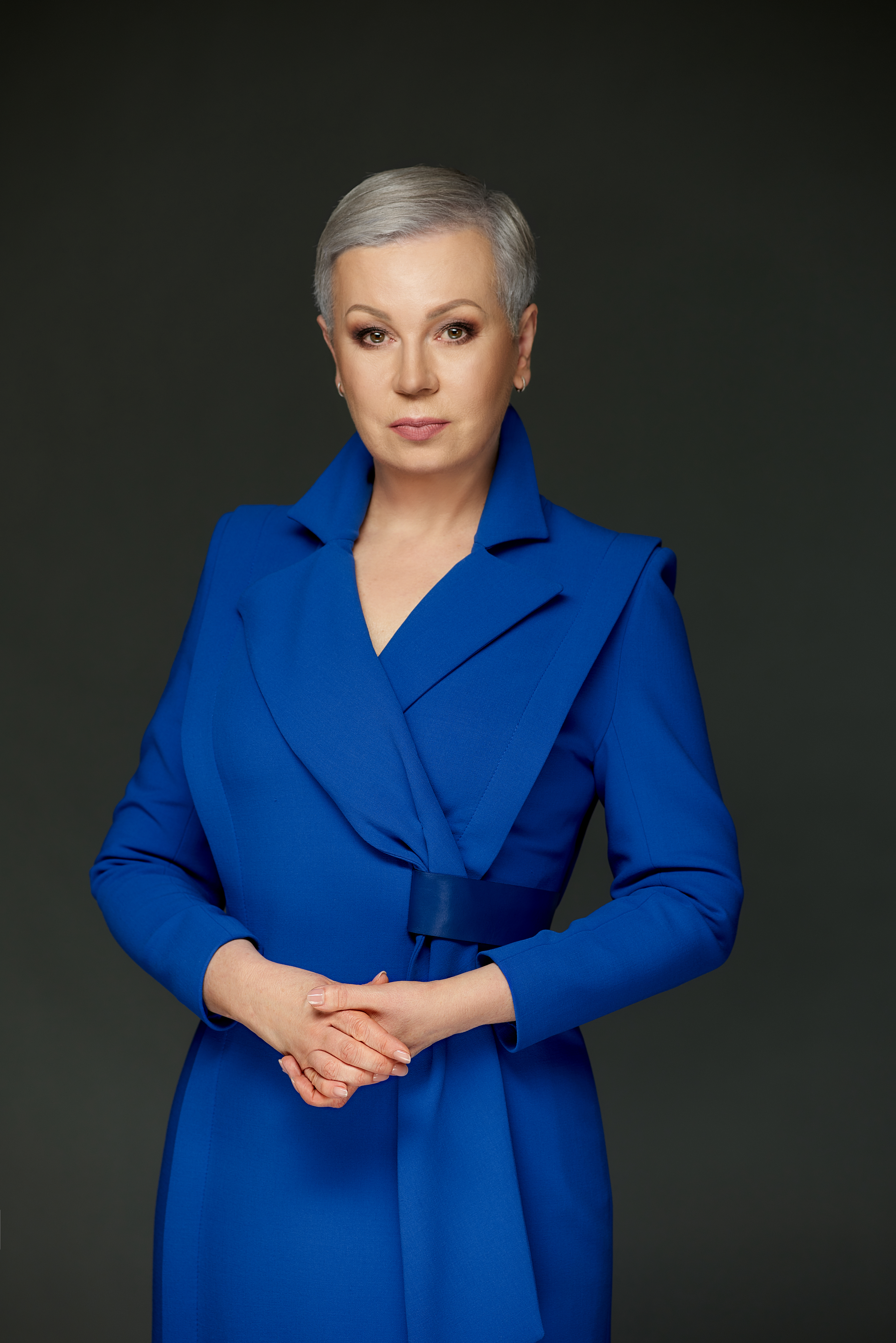
Alla Mazur

Alla Mazur (Ukrainian: Алла Григорівна Мазур) is a Ukrainian journalist and news presenter for the Ukrainian television programs TSN and TSN Week on the 1+1.

== Biography ==
She was born on September 16, 1965, in Zinkiv, a village in the Khmelnytskyi raion. Her father was a dentist, and her mother was a pediatric nurse. At school, she wrote articles for the local district newspaper, was a presenter and reporter at the school radio station. Mazur graduated from the Faculty of Journalism of Taras Shevchenko National University of Kyiv.
