= Andriy Kulykov =

Ukrainian journalist (born 1957)

- Куликов Андрій Вікторович
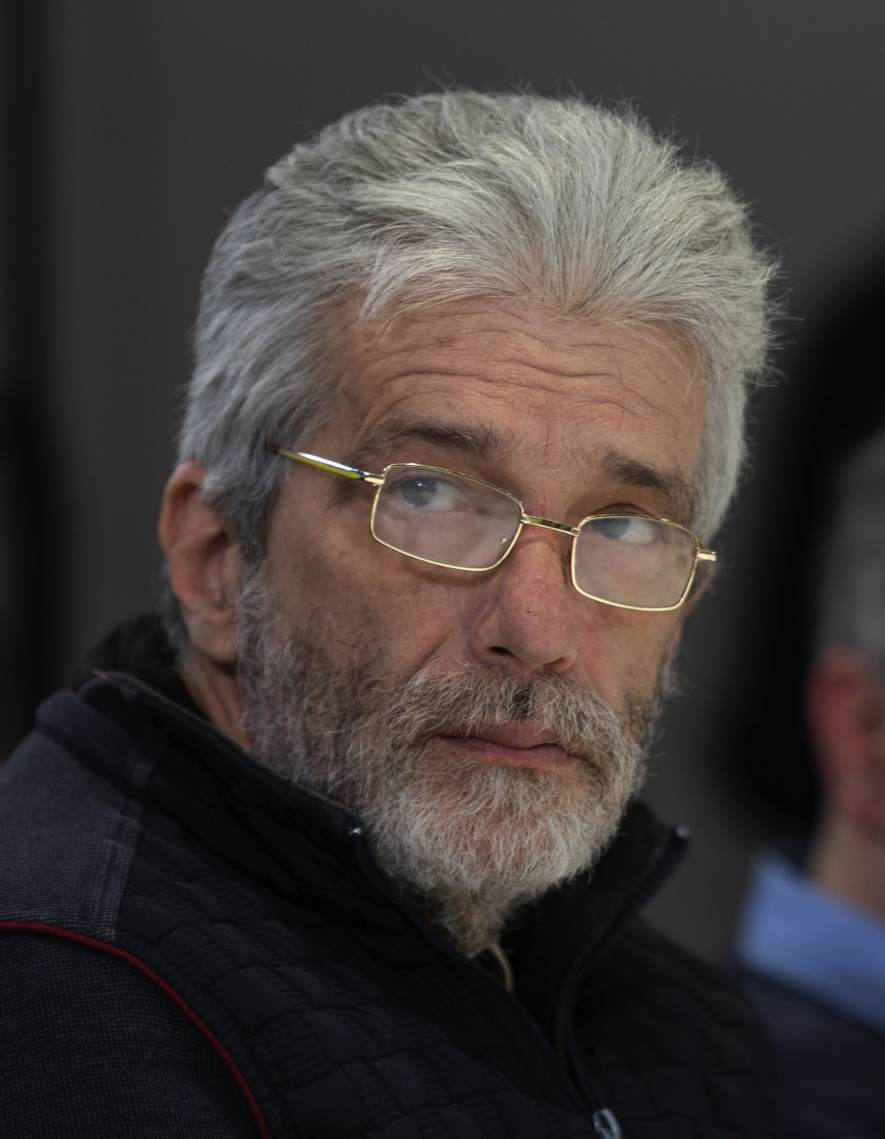
- Kulykov during a meeting with Volodymyr Zelenskyy
- Born: September 27, 1957 (age 69); Kiev, Soviet Ukraine, USSR
- Other names: Andron Dovhotelesy; Andrei Savitsky
- Citizenship: Former USSR; Current Ukraine
- Education: Taras Shevchenko National University of Kyiv
- Occupations: Journalist; Translator-referent
- Known for: Propagandist for the Soviet State who became an independent journalist in later years
- Television: The Freedom of Speech
- Awards: Teletriumph Award

Cofounder and Chair of the board of Hromadske Radio
- Incumbent
- Assumed office September 14, 2015
- Preceded by: Olexander Buzyuk

Chair of the Journalism Ethics Commission of Ukraine
- Incumbent
- Assumed office 2016
- Preceded by: Volodymyr Mostovyi
- Media related to Andriy Kulykov at Wikimedia Commons

Andriy Viktorovych Kulykov (born 1957) is a Ukrainian journalist, editor, television and radio presenter, actor, media expert, and media editor. He is widely known in Ukraine as the former host of Freedom of Speech (ICTV), a popular political talk show broadcast on ICTV, but he also been involved with the BBC, Hromadske Radio, and other news media publications and broadcasters. Kulykov is also a professional English-Ukrainian language Translator-referent. He has been involved in the journalistic effort to explain the Russian invasion of Ukraine to English-speaking audiences. On March 1, 2022, Kulykov was broadcasting live from his apartment when the Russian military bombed the Kyiv radio transmission tower. Kulykov also demanded the release of captured Ukrainian journalist Maksym Butkevych, publicly pleading the case for his safe return to Ukraine.

Kulykov is currently the chair of the board of Hromadske Radio and leads Ukraine’s Commission on Journalism Ethics, a professional self-regulatory body. He lectures regularly at higher education institutions across Ukraine, and is part of the academic staff at Mariupol State University in Donetsk Region. He holds academic credentials in international relations and works as a consulting translator. He also guest lectures at various Ukrainian and international universities including Harvard, Columbia, Oxford, Toronto, and others.

== Early life ==
Andriy Kulykov was born into a media-involved family; his grandmother, Nina Savytska, was a well-known announcer for Ukrainian Radio and played a significant role in introducing him to the world of broadcasting. His grandmother was also heavily involved in Ukrainian radio theatre productions. Although he was born into a Russian language household, his grandmother regularly provided him with Ukrainian-language literature, including works translated by Olha Senyuk and writings by Vsevolod Nestayko. Through reading and contact with his grandmother’s professional circle, Kulikov became fluent in Ukrainian.

During his adolescence, although he initially failed a voice audition in a radio studio, he developed a strong interest in radio programs, especially those in various languages including Ukrainian, Belarusian, and Polish. His early fascination with music and language led him to explore cultural and linguistic nuances through international radio broadcasts.

Kulykov's father was Viktor Kulikov, a teacher at the Kyiv Institute of Civil Aviation Engineers, and Zoya Kulikova, an employee at a long-distance telephone exchange.

He began his education at Kyiv Secondary School No. 57, which was known for its innovative language instruction. English was introduced from the first grade, and subjects such as history and geography were taught in English. Russian language instruction was also emphasized; notable figures such as Ariadna Shcherbytska, the wife of Ukrainian Soviet leader Volodymyr Shcherbytsky, taught there. At the time, few of Kulykov’s classmates spoke Ukrainian.

After completing the eighth grade, Kulykov transferred to Kyiv School No. 92, which used Ukrainian as the language of instruction. The school, housed in the historic Pavlo Galagan College building, fostered an environment where students interested in Ukrainian culture and history had access to additional resources. The school was known for attracting the children of Ukrainian dissidents, and during Kulykov’s time there, efforts were made by Soviet authorities to close it.

While he was attending Kyiv School No. 92, Kulykov witnessed searches and arrests of classmates’ family members, including the sons of dissidents Mykola Rudenko and Heliy Snehiryov. He also observed visits by state commissions tasked with removing publications deemed ideologically harmful. In response, school staff covertly saved many of these books, distributing them to private homes. Kulykov and his neighbors participated in preserving these materials, incorporating them into their personal libraries.

While in the tenth grade, Kulykov participated in a school drama club and was invited to apply to a theatre institute. However, upon consulting his grandmother, he was dissuaded from pursuing acting and later acknowledged her judgment as accurate, recognizing a distinction between artistic performance and comedic expression.

Kulykov graduated in 1979 from the Faculty of International Relations and International Law at Taras Shevchenko National University of Kyiv. Unable to immediately find employment in his field, he worked unloading freight at the Petrivka railway station (later renamed Pochaina railway station) and provided private language lessons. While he was working at the train yard, a journalist acquaintance encouraged him to submit trial pieces to the newspaper The News from Ukraine, two of which were published.

== Career as a journalist ==
=== Soviet propagandist ===
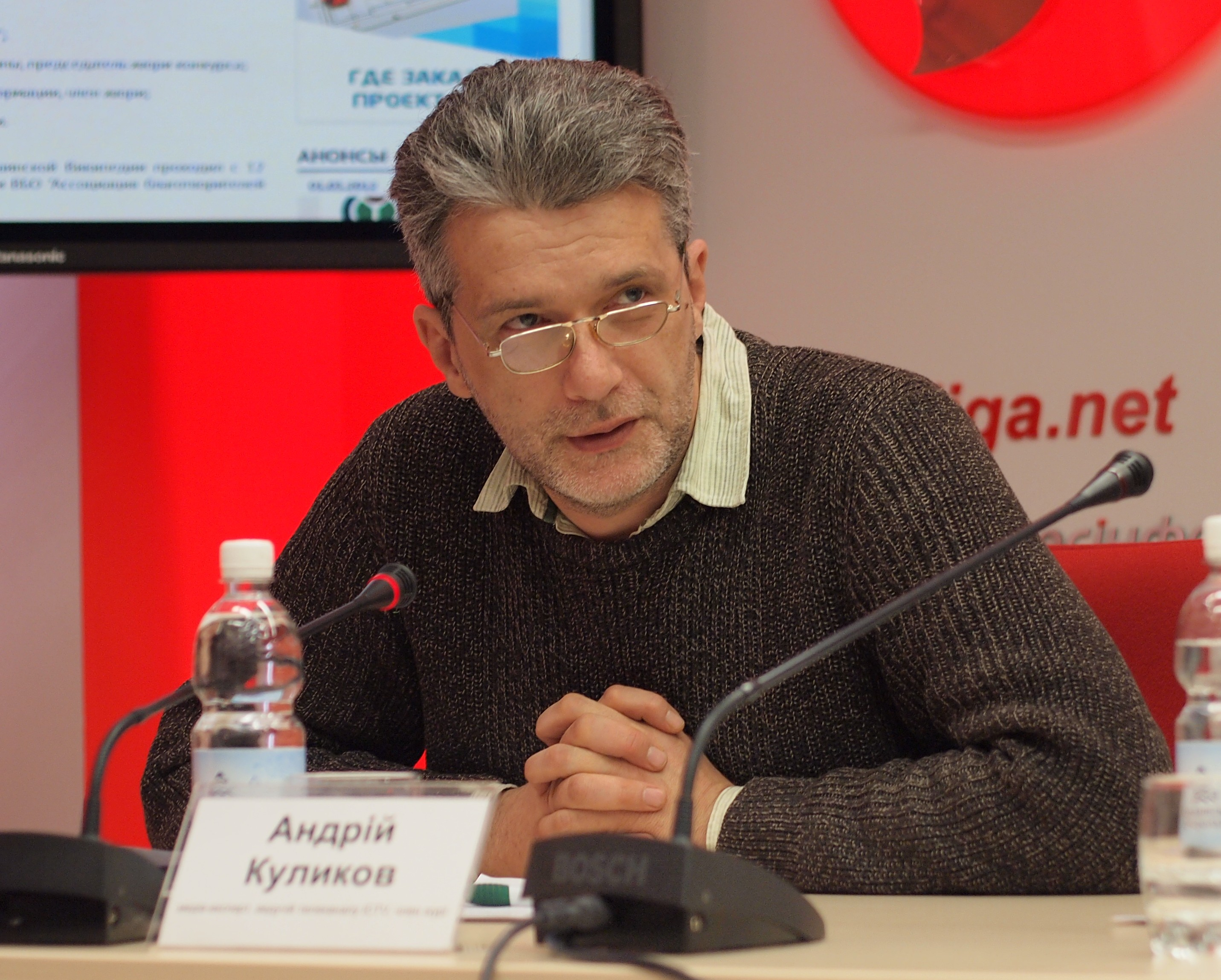
Andriy Kulykov at the press-conference for the "Writing About Charity" Ukrainian Wikipedia writing contest in 2012. Kulykov was one of the independent jurors for the contest.

Andriy Kulykov began his journalistic career with The News From Ukraine in 1979, which was a Kyiv-based publication associated with the KDB URSR, and was an organ of the KGB-funded Association for Cultural Relations with Ukrainians Abroad during the Soviet period of Ukraine. Kulykov worked in the newspaper’s Soviet propaganda department, where he remained for 13 years.

Kulykov has said that the primary inciting incident which solidified his transition into independent journalism was the Chernobyl disaster in 1986. During the latter half of the 1980s, the journalistic team at The News From Ukraine took part in the broader reform movement within the press.

=== BBC Ukrainian Service ===
In 1991, following the Dissolution of the Soviet Union, the BBC World Service launched a Ukrainian-language department. To prepare for this, it organized a seminar for about 30 Ukrainian journalists who were proficient in English. Six months later, those participants were invited to compete for newly available roles at the BBC Ukrainian Service. Andriy Kulykov was one of the successful applicants. According to Kulykov, the first four Ukrainians to join the service were Oleksiy Sologubenko, Kira Fomenko, Natalia Skofenko, and himself. Sologubenko quickly advanced, eventually holding leadership roles across various sections of the BBC World Service. Kulykov spent four years in London, from 1991 to 1995, initially working as a producer and later as a senior producer.

=== Entry into Ukrainian television ===
In 1996, Kulykov joined Internews-Ukraine (MMC), a media organization founded by Mykola Kniazhytsky. He was initially offered the position of Editor-in-chief, but later stepped into the role of Deputy editor-in-chief, overseeing six weekly programs. This period marked his transition into television journalism, allowing him to gain practical experience in TV production. He worked alongside journalists such as Serhiy Kutsy, Heorhiy Gongadze, Oksana Novosad, and Yuriy Gorban.

Kulykov joined 1+1, where he served as a production editor and deputy director of TSN. He credits Oleksandr Tkachenko with significantly influencing his development in television journalism, particularly in organizing the production process. During this time, 1+1 integrated its information and analytical content into a cohesive editorial approach, which reflected a distinct Ukrainian style.

He held the position of editor-in-chief of TSN twice: once for a single day and again for one week in 1998. His brief tenures were affected by political pressures, including resistance to editorial directives from figures such as Vadym Rabinovich, who influenced TSN's content at the time. Kulykov’s refusal to adhere to instructions about excluding certain politicians from coverage, such as Yulia Tymoshenko and Oleksandr Yelyashkevych, ultimately led to his departure from the channel.

From 1998 to 1999, Kulykov worked at the newly established New Channel as editor-in-chief, at the invitation of general producer Mikhail Pavlov. His work there was experimental, emphasizing improvisation and minimal political content. The channel’s studio was characterized by a flexible, open-door policy toward new contributors and programming ideas, resulting in a dynamic but loosely structured editorial environment.

Following the arrival of Oleksandr Tkachenko’s team at New Channel, Andriy Kulykov was offered the opportunity to lead its Reporter news program. He declined, opting not to return to conventional news formats after his earlier period of experimental broadcasting. Instead, he collaborated with Ihor Husiev, the former chief on-air director at New Channel, to develop a program called Night Dramaturgy, a stylized, whimsical portrait-style show that Kulykov hosted on STB.

=== Return to BBC ===
In 2000, Andriy Kulykov returned to London to work once more as a producer for the BBC Ukrainian Service. Although Kulyvov says that he briefly considered settling permanently in the United Kingdom, he ultimately decided to return to Ukraine, viewing it as offering greater professional opportunities. During this period, the BBC Ukrainian editorial office began incorporating internet-based content and broadcasting from a self-operated studio. Despite these developments, Kulykov concluded that he had reached the limits of his growth within the organization.

Kulykov remained with the BBC for seven years (2000–2007). In the final two years, from 2005 to 2007, he also worked in Ukraine as an expert in the European Union's educational initiative "Development of Media Skills," a journalism training initiative in Ukraine.

During the Orange Revolution in late 2004, Kulykov served as the BBC’s correspondent from Kyiv's Independence Square, broadcasting in Ukrainian, Russian, and English. His coverage included reports specifically prepared for the BBC's domestic British audience.

After Viktor Yushchenko's electoral victory, Volodymyr Oseledchyk, general producer of 1+1, invited Kulykov to reorganize the TSN newsroom. Kulykov participated in the project but did not stay permanently, as he was already committed to other plans. This period was marked by a renewed emphasis on editorial independence at 1+1, with staff pledging to report truthfully and restore the network’s journalistic standards.

=== The Freedom of Speech and television career ===
Following his final return from London in 2007, Kulykov was invited by Mikhail Pavlov to host The Freedom of Speech on ICTV, succeeding Savik Shuster. Kulykov emphasized the importance of active listening in talk show hosting, viewing it as a key to establishing genuine dialogue with participants. He also acknowledged the challenge of balancing personal presence with the neutral role of a moderator. He served in this position until 2016.

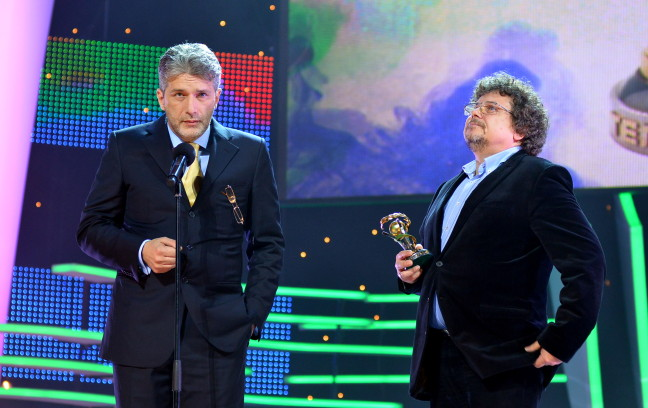
In 2012, The Freedom of Speech won the Teletriumph Award for Best Political Talk Show on Ukrainian television that year. Kulykov (left) also won Best Host of a Talk Show in 2013. Producer Mykhailo Pavlov is on the right.

As host of The Freedom of Speech, Kulykov was a multiple-time recipient of the Teletriumph Awards. During his 2012 acceptance of the Teletriumph Award for Best Political Talk Show, Kulykov made an impassioned speech that was cut from the televised broadcast of the event. In the edited broadcast aired on Ukraina, only a brief acknowledgment from The Freedom of Speech producer Mykhailo Pavlov was included. The awards were presented by individuals dressed in identical outfits, with their faces painted in similar fashions to the members of the Blue Man Group. Kulykov ridiculed this outfit:

"Some people on this stage are painted in blue, red, and green. Orange is missing. When orange disappears, there is no crimson. This should be a warning to all of us. We should not allow our colors to disappear. We must not allow our languages to disappear from our television, we must not allow colleagues to disappear from our community.
But we know how things are arranged: we’re not allowed to show certain colors. We’re not allowed to show certain ideas on our television screens. We’re not allowed to show our solidarity with colleagues. On our show, people of different colors and views work together — and that’s the point. People with different political beliefs — and maybe even some poets — speak their minds freely."

Later, in response to a question by journalists about whether this exclusion from the broadcast was an act of censorship, Kulykov said:

"Only the people who made the decision to cut that segment from the broadcast can answer that question. I personally found it strange that it wasn’t shown. That’s my opinion. I also find it strange that they cut out my speech. In the end, it only confirms the idea that it's easier to broadcast something safer. And I mean that literally, considering the words of the host."

In 2011, he joined a group of media representatives on a visit to President Viktor Yanukovych's residence at Mezhyhirya, which included an interview with the President. The trip attracted public criticism from some journalists, including Mustafa Nayem, for allegedly compromising editorial independence. Kulykov defended his decision to participate.

In 2011, Kulykov launched the radio program Season of the Year on Era FM. The show combined elements of political talk and music programming, which was seen as unconventional. Kulykov has clarified that he did not consider himself a political journalist but rather a general assignment reporter, which he views as the most demanding branch of journalism. He positioned Season of the Year as an informational and educational program, using it as a platform to introduce quality rock music—particularly Ukrainian—to a broader and younger audience. He has said that he believed such music remained underrepresented on Ukrainian radio.

=== Return to radio and the creation of Hromadske ===
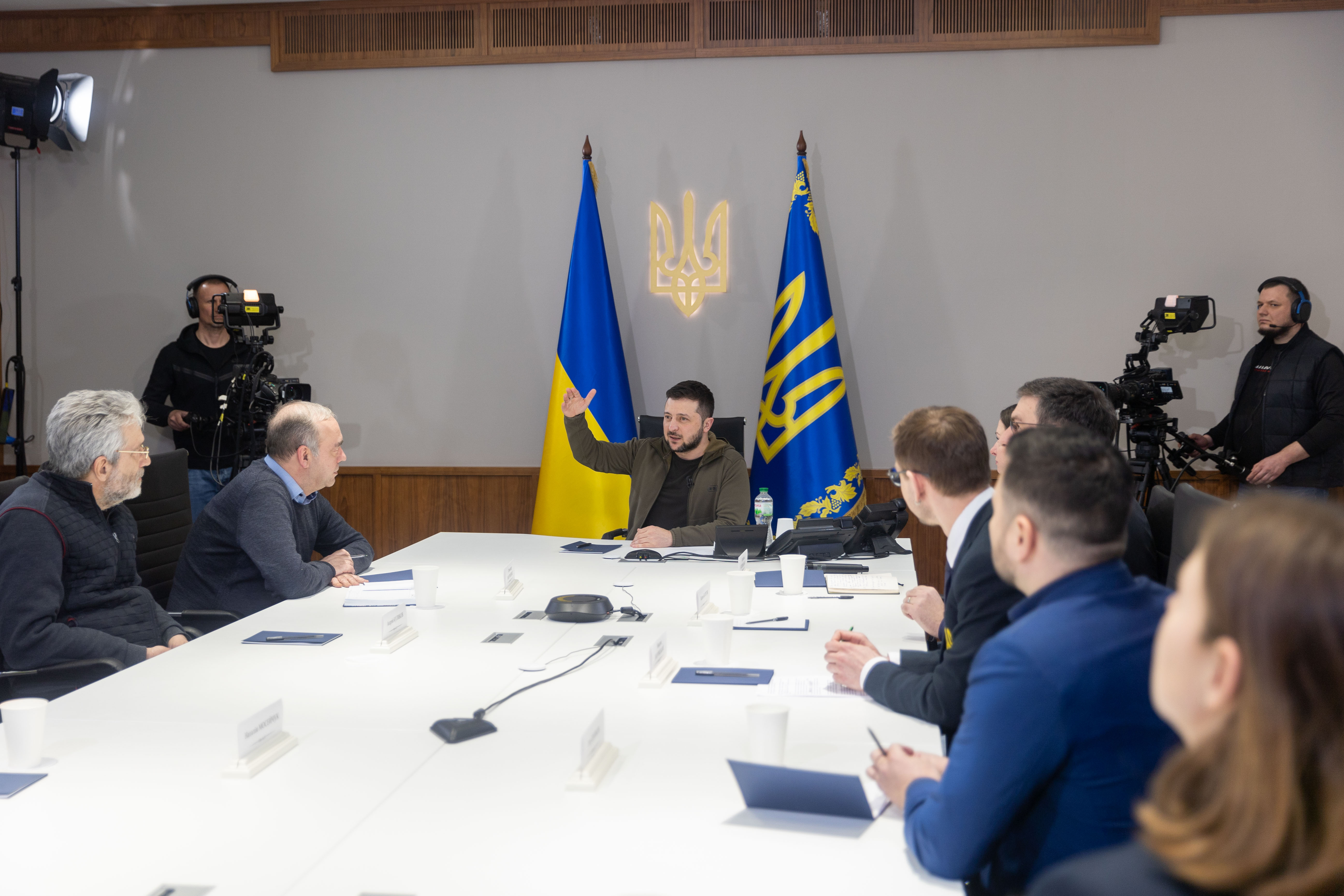
President Volodymyr Zelenskyy (center) gesticulating to Kulykov (left) during a meeting.

In 2013, Kulykov co-founded Hromadske Radio, an independent Ukrainian public-interest radio station.

During the 2013–2014 Euromaidan protests, Kulykov was intensely involved in the journalistic coverage of the events. Although he was at Hromadske Radio, Kulykov also produced a series of English-language podcasts for the BBC, including reports from key events such as the storming of the Ukrainian House and a later report from Crimea in early March 2014.

The head producer of ICTV at the time, Alexander Borgutsky, remembers that on the morning that the Maidan were dispersed by government forces, he went out to the market. He saw Kulykov on the steps of Saint Michael's, weeping. Inside the church were students that had been beaten by government forces.

From late 2015 to early 2016, A Word to Kulykov aired on Radio Vesti.

In 2016, Kulykov left The Freedom of Speech to join Hromadske Radio full time, a move that surprised both the media industry and his audience. He cited radio's unique potential — often undervalued by Ukrainian audiences and investors — as a motivating factor. He became chair of the board of Hromadske Radio and has spoken publicly about the role of media in a democratic society, the shared responsibility of journalists and audiences, and the future of journalism in Ukraine.

In 2016, Season of the Year transitioned to Hromadske Radio. Kulykov has credited the program with influencing changes in Ukraine’s media landscape, particularly regarding the introduction of quotas for Ukrainian-language music on the airwaves.

Since 2016, he has been involved full-time with the station and has also worked on projects for Hromadske TV, another third-sector media platform. Kulykov is also known for his regular visits to the Donbas region. He sees this as a journalistic responsibility to maintain direct communication with colleagues in the Ukrainian government-controlled areas of Donetsk and Luhansk oblasts and to stay informed about local conditions. He has advocated for greater representation of local journalists' work from the region on national television.

In 2019, Kulykov moderated the 2019 Ukrainian presidential election debate at the Kyiv Olympic Sports Complex, alongside Olena Frolyak.

== Political career ==
In the late 1980s, Kulykov played a role in the establishment of the Rukh (People’s Movement of Ukraine), particularly within Kyiv and other regions of the country.

In 1989, Andriy Kulykov was a self-nominated candidate in the elections to the Congress of People's Deputies of the USSR. And in 1990, labor collectives nominated him as a People's Deputy of the Ukrainian SSR. But later, Andriy decided that he did not want to be a people's deputy.

== Career as translator-referent ==
In addition to his media work, Kulykov has translated various literary and academic works, including an art history monograph by Olga Petrova, and has published under the pen names Andron Dovhotelesy and Andrei Savitsky.

In the late 1980s, Kulykov was involved in the foundation of the Ukrainian Language Society.

He contributed translations for the Ukrainian-language rock album 70/80: Classic Rock in Ukrainian Style by the Kyiv band Stone Guest, including a Ukrainian cover of Slade's song “Coz I Love You.” His work spans journalism, translation, education, and media advocacy, with a longstanding commitment to public broadcasting and cultural expression in Ukraine.

== See also ==
- Hromadske Radio
- Savik Shuster
- Vadym Karpyak
