= Oksana Sokolova =

Ukrainian journalist and television host (born 1971)

- Оксана Соколова
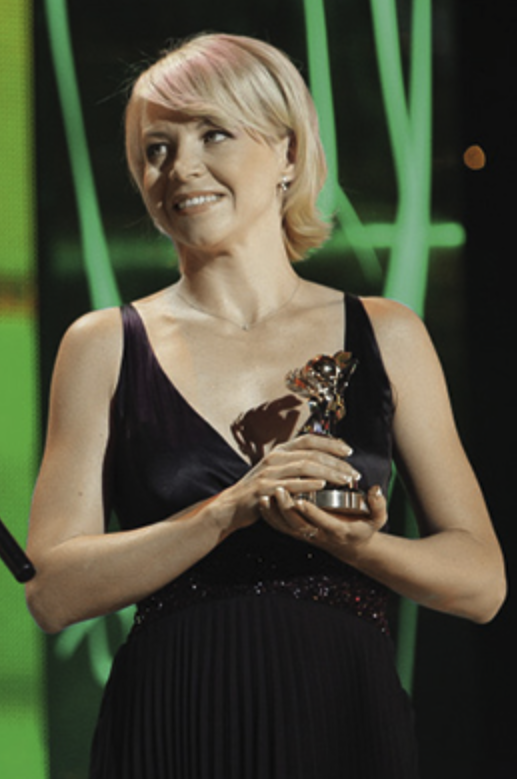
- Teletriumph Awards (2007)

Press Secretary for the Prosecutor General of Ukraine
- In office 2003–2005
- Prosecutor: Gennadiy Vasilyev

Special Press Adviser to the USSR Regional Governor of Cherkasy
- In office Mid 90's
- Governor: Volodymyr Lukyanets

Personal details
- Born: May 13, 1971 (age 55) Cherkasy, Ukrainian Soviet Socialist Republic, USSR
- Education: Taras Shevchenko National University of Kyiv
- Awards: Honored Journalist of Ukraine; Teletriumph; Award For Merits to the Armed Forces of Ukraine

Oksana Mykolayivna Sokolova is a Ukrainian journalist, television producer, and television presenter, known for her long-standing contributions to Ukraine's television journalism industry. She serves as head of the editorial office at Starlight News. She is the creator and host of Facts of the Week on ICTV.

Sokolova is considered one of the most prominent journalists in Ukraine. In 2012, the magazine Focus placed her at 64th in their list of the 100 most influential women in Ukraine. One of her longtime co-hosts is the journalist Sergei Kudimov.

== Early life ==
Oksana Sokolova was born in Cherkasy, the capital city of the extremely Russified region of the Ukrainian Soviet Socialist Republic, the Cherkasy Oblast. Her grandmother, a World War II front-line nurse, survived harrowing conditions, celebrated the victory in Berlin, and lived into old age. Despite being part of the Soviet system as a party worker, she secretly baptized Sokolova at home and harbored anti-regime views, partially due to the persecution of Christians in the Soviet Union. Her grandfather had been a victim of Stalinist repression, an experience that deeply influenced family attitudes toward Soviet authority. The stories her grandparents told of quiet defiance and perseverance shaped Sokolova’s individual values.

Sokolova's birth father was the famous Ukrainian mathematician and architect Mykola Fedorovych, who designed the Cherkasy Machine-Building Plant. Her mother and father constantly fought, often storming off to different rooms, and she witnessed most of the fights. Her birth parents divorced when she was six, and though she knew her father’s whereabouts, they never reconciled. Years later, she discovered she had a half-brother, an award-winning physics student, when she recognized their shared rare surname in the news after he won the International Physics Olympiad.

Sokolova's stepfather, a charismatic musician and collector of Western music, introduced her to global culture and shaped her aesthetic sensibility. Sokolova, herself mathematically gifted, contrasted with her mother’s artistic temperament but found inspiration in her mother’s late-life reinvention as founder of a successful children’s music studio. Raised in a musically inclined family, she was expected to become a professional pianist like her mother and stepfather, both music educators. As a child, she attended music school, although she did not enjoy the experience. Following eighth grade, she was expected to continue into a specialized music school. However, most of her peers remained in general education. In February, on the way to a routine music lesson, while entering the building, she slipped and fell on the steps, fracturing her arm. Despite the injury, she attempted to attend class, but the swelling forced an emergency room visit where the fracture was confirmed. Seeking to remove the cast early in time to attend an International Women’s Day event on March 8, she cut it off herself, causing the bone to shift. While the injury eventually healed, the resulting loss of fine motor control ended any prospects of a professional musical career, something she later recalled with relief.

In high school, Sokolova developed an interest in the exact sciences. She enrolled in the correspondence division of the Physics and Mathematics School affiliated with Moscow State University. This affiliation allowed direct admission to several technical universities in Moscow. However, the Chernobyl disaster in 1986 disrupted these plans. Her mother temporarily relocated the family to Moscow, but they encountered social stigma from local residents due to fears of radiation exposure. The experience left her with a lasting negative impression of Moscow, leading Sokolova to pursue higher education in Kyiv instead.

=== University years ===
She enrolled in the Institute of Journalism at the Taras Shevchenko National University of Kyiv, (referred to informally as narvisik, a slang term for journalism institutes) partly due to her early involvement in school editorial work and student leadership. Her university years coincided with a tumultuous historical period: the dissolution of the Soviet Union, the 1991 Moscow coup attempt, Ukraine’s declaration of independence, and the 1990 student-led Revolution on Granite. Sokolova and her peers were actively engaged in the political and civic life of the time. Her university was one of the first to renounce the Komsomol, and she formed close ties with students from Western Ukraine, which deepened her connection to Ukrainian language and culture.

During this period, Sokolova was introduced to Ukrainian traditions such as caroling, which was unfamiliar to her due to her upbringing in the predominantly Russified region of Cherkasy. Together with fellow students, including the future singer and TV host Angelica Rudnytska, she embraced these cultural practices, even wearing traditional costumes and caroling through Kyiv. One memorable occasion involved visiting a professor who offered them mead, making their return home quite difficult.

Sokolova met her first husband, an Afghan man named Alexander, while studying at university; she was 20, and he was 23, having served in the army. Like many of their classmates, they married young, planning their wedding alongside peers during a summer filled with celebrations. Known for her creativity, Sokolova became affectionately associated with the name "Sokolova" after being serenaded at a wedding to a parody of a popular song. The couple lived in a small dormitory room reserved for veterans, where she took pride in decorating, despite the economic hardship of the early 1990s. To buy essentials like milk, they sometimes had to collect and redeem bottles for ration coupons, enduring long queues and scarcity.

While seeking employment at a Kyiv editorial office, she was subjected to inappropriate sexual behavior by a senior colleague. During a corporate event held at a hotel, Sokolova was led by senior staff into a separate room under the pretext of receiving a surprise. There, she encountered the editor-in-chief, who made suggestive overtures indicating a sexual proposition. Although the situation did not escalate to physical violence, the intent and context were unambiguous. Sokolova resisted the advance and expressed concern that her refusal could cost her the job. She ultimately did not lose her position. She chose not to publicly name the individual or the media outlet, but stated that the incident occurred in Kyiv. Sokolova also described her shock at discovering that such behavior was considered routine or acceptable by others in the workplace, with some colleagues implying that she had forfeited a valuable opportunity by refusing the editor-in-chief's proposition.

== Early career in regional and national journalism ==
After graduation, Sokolova returned to Cherkasy to work at the regional television and radio company (TRC). Sokolova began her broadcasting career here, during Ukraine's second presidential election campaign.

Her husband joined the Ministry of Internal Affairs, eventually pursuing further education at the Academy of Internal Affairs. However, by the mid-1990s, salaries in the police force went unpaid, and compensation came in the form of food rations, such as canned goods and grains. Officers were sometimes told they had been given weapons and should "go and earn," a sentiment her husband found unacceptable. Their marriage, though lasting around thirteen years, was rooted more in friendship than a fully formed adult partnership, similar in a fashion to the youthful and impulsive nature of many such student unions at the time.

When the opportunity arose to work abroad, Oksana Sokolova's husband took it, eventually settling in Belgium thanks to his talent for languages and musical ear, which helped him master Flemish within two years. For about seven years, the couple lived between two countries, but Sokolova has told interviewers that the arrangement couldn't last forever. Oksana and her son would board a bus and travel for two days at a time between Kyiv and Belgium. Sokolova, whose career in Ukraine was flourishing, never seriously considered moving, and over time, both realized they were on different paths. The marriage had become a formality, and their eventual divorce was peaceful.

=== First National Channel and the regional government ===
Sokolova’s journalism career progressed steadily. The regional station she worked for then became a substation or "sobkron" (literally translated: "Sub-Crown") of the First National Channel, and Sokolova was advanced to the position of regional correspondent for the national station. At just 23 years old, she became the first female and youngest correspondent for the First National Channel. At a time when large commercial TV channels were just emerging in Ukraine, she also worked as a freelance contributor, producing reports for both 1+1 and Internews Vikna. Constantly writing and reporting, she commuted weekly from Cherkasy to Kyiv.

In 1996, she was invited by Oleksandr Tkachenko to join 1+1. However, she approached the offer casually and didn’t take the audition seriously. At the time, she had a young son named Vsevolod, and life in Cherkasy was comfortable. Her mother helped with childcare, she had her own office and program, a service car, and had just received a three-room apartment. Everything seemed stable, so she didn’t feel the urgency to leave. At the time, being a regional correspondent for the First National Channel also came with real and legitimate influence. Sokolova was frequently invited by the Governor of Cherkasy, Volodymyr Lukyanets, to attend key meetings and advise on public perception during politically sensitive events, such as the miners' protest marches to Kyiv.

In the late 1990s, impressed with her abilities, Governor Lukyantsev offered her the position as head of the regional TRC. However, Sokolova declined he offer. She was only about 30, while the staff was significantly older and much more entrenched in Soviet ideologies in journalism. Sokolova, however, had been vastly influenced by Western-style journalism standards.

Sokolova decided to move to Kyiv. She began cold-calling her friends in the industry, searching for a new job in the city. One of her former classmates, Mykola Knyazhytskyi, then offered her a role at the new team at ICTV.

== Early career at ICTV ==
Oksana Sokolova packed her bags, returned the official “nine car," and moved to Kyiv. She sold her apartment in Cherkasy and purchased a modest Khrushchyovka in the capital. Her son initially stayed behind with her mother in Cherkasy, as Sokolova planned to bring him to Kyiv within six months, once the apartment was renovated. However, the proceeds from the sale only covered half the necessary repairs. With limited funds, she completed the renovation slowly, gluing one strip of wallpaper each night after work. Despite the exhaustion, she finished the apartment, and her son finally joined her in Kyiv. Shortly after, he began first grade.

=== First major story at ICTV ===
Sokolova joined ICTV in 2000, working initially as a reporter. At first, as a newcomer to the capitol from the provinces, she wasn’t trusted with serious assignments, only light reports from kindergartens, despite having covered major political events back in Cherkasy. Her first major story came by chance. A colleague scheduled to cover a critical meeting in Poland, between the Ukrainian opposition and Polish deputies fell ill just before departure. The Poles were anxious about the brewing political conflict in Ukraine, and had offered their support in mediating the conflict.

At 11 p.m. that evening, the station administrator called Sokolova and said: “Artem is sick, and you're the only journalist here with a valid Schengen visa.” She was told only to show up at 7:30 a.m., collect the gear and operator, and catch the train. The rest, she would figure out en route. Without knowing the topic, the city, where to eat, or whom to meet, she relied on public payphones, jumping off the train at each station to make frantic calls with a coin while her cameraman stood by the emergency brake in case she was delayed. Despite the chaos, she managed to find strong material, even filming at the table where General Jaruzelski had once signed a reconciliation treaty with the Polish opposition, joking on camera that maybe Poland could lend Ukraine the same table to help resolve its own political crisis. The Poland story earned her praise from her editors.

Later, she was assigned as a parliamentary correspondent. By late 2001, she became a presenter for the channel’s morning news programs.

Sokolova met her second husband, Andriy Demartinov, through work, though their relationship developed slowly over a decade. At the time, Andriy was a historian, and she was assigned to interview him about his book on the Ukrainian rebel movement of 1917–1918. Together with a cameraman, they set out to find the grave of rebel leader Vasyl Chuchupak. Although Andriy spoke confidently, they ended up wandering through an overgrown cemetery for hours. Then, caught in a sudden downpour of rain, they took shelter in the car and talked, sparking a connection that eventually led to a relationship. Their wedding was low-key and spontaneous: they went to the registry office in the morning, signed the papers, then each drove to work. Only that evening did they tell family and friends. Sokolova’s son reportedly accepted her second marriage without conflict.

=== Brief service in government ===
In 2004, Sokolova briefly stepped away from journalism to serve as press secretary for the Prosecutor General of Ukraine, Gennadiy Vasilyev. She returned to ICTV in 2005, the year following his resignation. Reflecting on her brief tenure in the Prosecutor General’s Office, she later acknowledged that the experience had been personally and professionally dissonant, describing it as feeling like "a foreign body" in an environment fundamentally different from journalism. In her view, the role of prosecutor’s office spokesperson and journalist were inherently difficult to reconcile due to their opposing natures. Nevertheless, she spoke with admiration about Vasilyev, characterizing him as "the best boss one could imagine" and expressing genuine regret that she would not have the opportunity to continue working with him.

In 2005, upon her return to the station, Sokolova was involved in both editorial and production capacities, including serving as editor-in-chief at The Freedom of Speech, when it was anchored by Andriy Kulykov.

== Facts of the Week ==
ICTV management was so greatly impressed with her work on the show that in 2006, they offered her the opportunity to create and host her own news program. The weekly current affairs program that she created was called Facts of the Week with Oksana Sokolova, which was one of the most popular shows in Ukraine. This was the weekend edition of the popular show Facts, hosted by Olena Frolyak, who had also joined ICTV in the year 2000.

On February 12, 2006, the first broadcast of Facts of the Week With Oksana Sokolova aired on ICTV. At the time, the team consisted of only six members: three reporters, an editor-in-chief, a presenter, and a director. The initial runtime was 21 minutes. The program rapidly gained popularity, expanding its format and length. Over time, its runtime increased to over two hours. The show quickly became known throughout Ukraine, and even in areas of Russia, for its journalistic ambition and high production standards. Facts of the Week evolved into one of Ukraine’s leading weekend news review television programs. The team of correspondents reported from global hotspots like Afghanistan, covered military conflict zones in eastern Ukraine, and secured exclusive footage from North Korea, one of the world’s most secluded countries.

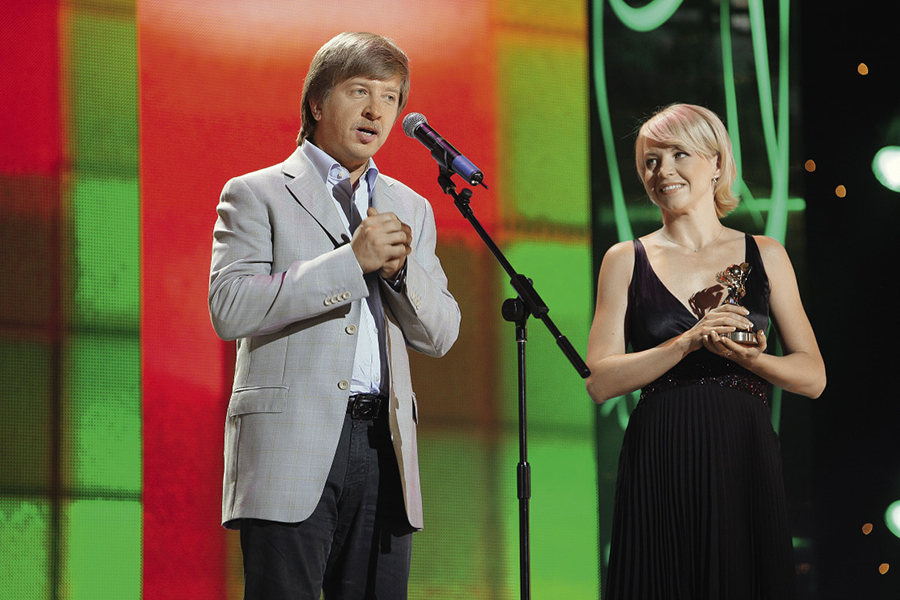
Oksana Sokolova (right), with her editor-in-chief Victor Varnitsky (left) at Teletriumph 2007, held at Palace Ukraine. The Teletriumphs are the national television awards of Ukraine.

By 2013, a team of approximately 40 full-time professionals supported the production, including dedicated investigative and life-entertainment units. The program had also been recognized at the Teletriumphs, winning in its “Best Program of the Year” category four times and in 2011, earning Sokolova herself her first statuette for “Best Information Program Host.”

=== Russo-Ukrainian War ===
During the Euromaidan protests, the Revolution of Dignity, and the onset of the fighting in Eastern Ukraine, Sokolova was one of Ukraine's leading television presenters and editors. She has described this period to other journalists as having a great psychological on her, finding an outlet in planting daffodils and tulips in her back garden. Despite widespread fear in Ukraine, and some colleagues leaving Kyiv, Sokolova remained at her post. She and her team faced the challenges of reporting under conditions of extreme risk, and this was the first time in her career that she was required to purchase protective helmets and flak jackets for herself and her staff while reporting from her own country. In some cases, her news team played a critical role in locating wounded soldiers or confirming the survival of individuals whose images had appeared in field reports. The journalists also assisted in delivering copies of war service records to the families of recently deceased Ukrainian soldiers that the team had also incidentally captured in the final photographs of their lives.

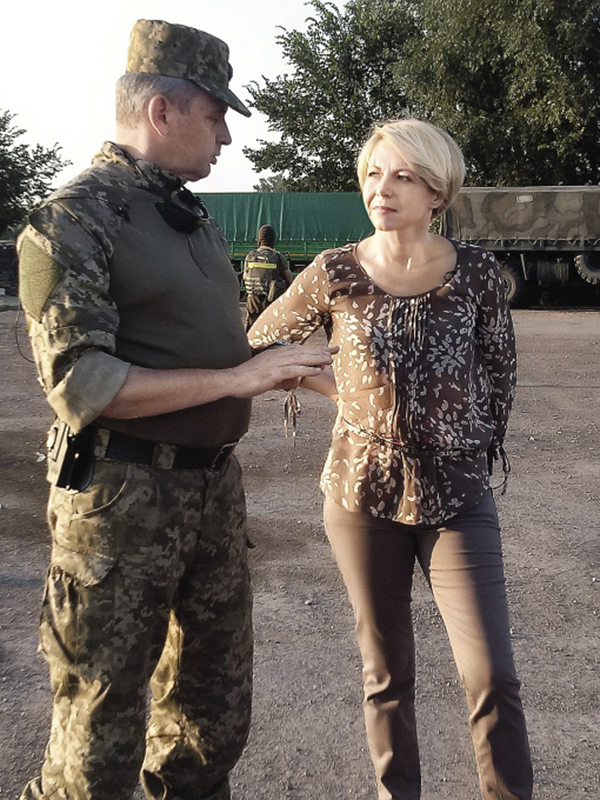
Sokolova with the head of the General Staff of the Armed Forces of Ukraine, Viktor Muzhenko, during the events surrounding the Siege of Slavyansk in 2015

After the beginning of the War in Donbas, Sokolova was forced to travel with security and bodyguards for several months due to ongoing anonymous threats on her life. She reported receiving phone calls with threats of violence. After filing a complaint with the Prosecutor General’s Office, the case was investigated by the Security Service of Ukraine (SBU), which eventually traced the origin of the threats to individuals based in the self-proclaimed Luhansk People’s Republic (LNR). Sokolova noted that the individuals involved were reportedly connected to the media sector. She described the intimidation as part of a broader campaign to pressure Ukrainian journalists and suppress independent reporting in the context of the war in Donbas. Sokolova emphasized that she had received training in personal safety, including how to react in case of chemical attacks such as acid assaults.

=== Six month absence ===
In July 2016, Sokolova unexpectedly stepped away from her role as host of Facts of the Week, during what many considered the height of her broadcasting career. Her departure, however, was not impulsive. According to later interviews, Sokolova had long considered a temporary break as a means of professional renewal. Although she had continued working in television production alongside her role as presenter, she expressed a desire for creative change—either by evolving the existing program or by pursuing a new project altogether. She stated that Facts of the Week, in its then-current format, had reached a level of maturity and audience familiarity that prompted her to seek new challenges.

The idea of taking a pause had been discussed with ICTV management prior to her departure. Although identifying a suitable replacement and maintaining the cohesion of the editorial team presented logistical difficulties, Sokolova remained involved in the program remotely during her break.

== The new Facts of the Week ==
Her return to television in early 2017 was accompanied by a refreshed on-screen image and a revised version of the program's final news segment, signaling a new phase in her ongoing role with the network. The new program was called 100 Minutes with Oksana Sokolova, also on ICTV, which lasted from 2017 to 2020. Her role as host of the program was taken over by Oksana Gutzeith in 2019, while Sokolova was advanced to higher leadership roles at ICTV.

In 2019, Sokolova suspected that someone was following her again.

Since 2020, she has hosted the rebranded Facts of the Week: 100 Minutes. Sokolova has also developed original television formats across different genres.

In 2022, Facts of the Week: 100 Minutes launched a YouTube channel called Oxygen (Ukrainian: Оксиген). The Oxygen channel offers journalism, original perspectives, investigative reporting, and human-centered stories. The debut video, hosted by journalist Maksym Krapivnyi, was about the widespread popularity of Ukrainian pop singer Oleg Vynnyk.

On 16 June 2021, Sokolova received the Award For Merits to the Armed Forces of Ukraine, presented by Serhiy Korniychuk, Chief of the General Staff of the Armed Forces of Ukraine. The honor recognized her contributions through media support and reporting related to national defense. Sokolova was commended for her team's journalistic work covering the conflict in eastern Ukraine. According to ICTV, she praised the efforts of war correspondents who reported from active combat zones, military-industrial facilities, and front-line positions in the Donbas region.

=== Outbreak of the 2022 full-scale Russian invasion ===
On February 24, 2022, the day Russia launched its full-scale invasion of Ukraine, Sokolova recalled being awake late into the night, having watched President Vladimir Putin's speech. She eventually drifted off to sleep but was awakened by a phone call from a colleague who was on assignment in Mariupol. The call confirmed what she had already sensed: the war had begun.

ICTV often broadcasts Russian language content, because many of the citizens of Eastern Ukraine grew up speaking Russian. Following the announcement of mobilization in Russia in September 2022, traffic from Russian viewers increased sharply. In the first week after the mobilization order, 46% of total viewership on the Russian-language channel originated from Russia. Comment activity suggested that viewers were genuine individuals seeking alternative perspectives to those provided by Russian state-controlled media. Many expressed skepticism, disbelief, or hostility toward ICTV’s reports. There was a deep contrast between Ukrainian coverage and what Sokolova has referred to as Russian propaganda. However, the level of engagement meant that some Russian viewers were actively questioning the official narrative.

To counteract what it calls disinformation, ICTV regularly translates its Ukrainian-language war reporting into Russian and distributes it through its digital platforms. The network has also offered to translate and share this verified content in English and other languages, aiming to support international broadcasters who may lack on-the-ground correspondents in Ukraine. This initiative is part of ICTV’s broader effort to provide accurate, first-hand reporting from within the war zone and to make such reporting accessible to global audiences not served by independent media within Russia.

In March 2022, during the early phase of the Russian invasion of Ukraine, residents of a village near Bucha, including friends of Sokolova, lived under Russian military occupation for two weeks. Russian forces had disabled communications infrastructure, cutting off mobile networks, internet, and television, leaving civilians without access to information. Food and medicine were in short supply, and residents could hear nearby gunfire and shelling without knowing whether it was safe to move or seek help. An old radio receiver found in an attic enabled access to a Ukrainian public radio broadcast. Journalists, some of them young women, had gone on air from Kyiv on 24 February and continued broadcasting even as the capital came under heavy bombardment, using home setups to remain on the air. These radio broadcasts informed residents in the occupied village about a temporary humanitarian corridor authorized by Russian troops, specifying the date and route for evacuation. Acting on this information, civilians were able to leave the occupied area safely.

In July 2022, Sokolova publicly debuted a significant change in her appearance, departing from her long-recognized blonde image to adopt a darker hair color. While this might not have been shocking to younger viewers, she had maintained the same blonde hairstyle and haircut since her days in regional broadcasting, and her longtime viewers – by this point 2 million people a week watched her on television – wondered if the hair color change was symbolic of anything. The transformation, she explained, was not merely aesthetic but symbolic of deeper personal and emotional shifts brought on by the war and accompanying life circumstances. She acknowledged that the first months of the full-scale Russian invasion of Ukraine were among the most difficult in her life. In addition to the national crisis, she was also coping with family-related issues, including the illness of her parents.

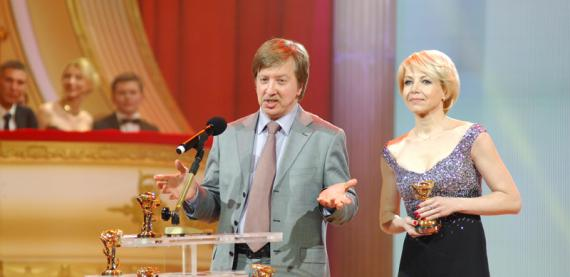
Sokolova and Varnitsky pictured here accepting an award at Teletriumph 2011. In 2022, Sokolova donated the Teletriumph she earned in 2011 to a fundraiser in support of de-mining operations in Ukraine.

On September 3, 2022, Sokolova donated her 2011 Teletriumph to a charity auction supporting combat engeering de-mining operations in Ukraine. The fundraiser invited prominent television personalities and public figures to contribute personal items and experiences for auction, with proceeds directed toward the Demining of Ukrainian Territories project. Members of the public were also encouraged to make direct donations, starting from 20 UAH, without participating in the draw.

=== Role as producer ===
From 2007 to 2013, she produced Maximum in Ukraine, a provocative investigative journalism program. Her other work includes involvement in analytical and documentary programming such as Theory of Conspiracy, which began airing in 2019.

== Documentary films ==
Release date	Film name	Director(s)	Scriptwriter(s)	Notes	Ref.
July, 2024	Crimea. The last citadel.	Andriy Mozgovoy	Elena Zorina	Screened at the 15th Odesa International Film Festival	
July, 2023	No right to a double	Andriy Mozgovoy, Vladyslav Tomashevskyi	Olena Zorina	Screened at the 14th Odesa International Film Festival	
