= Danylo Yanevsky =

Ukrainian historian, journalist and television presenter

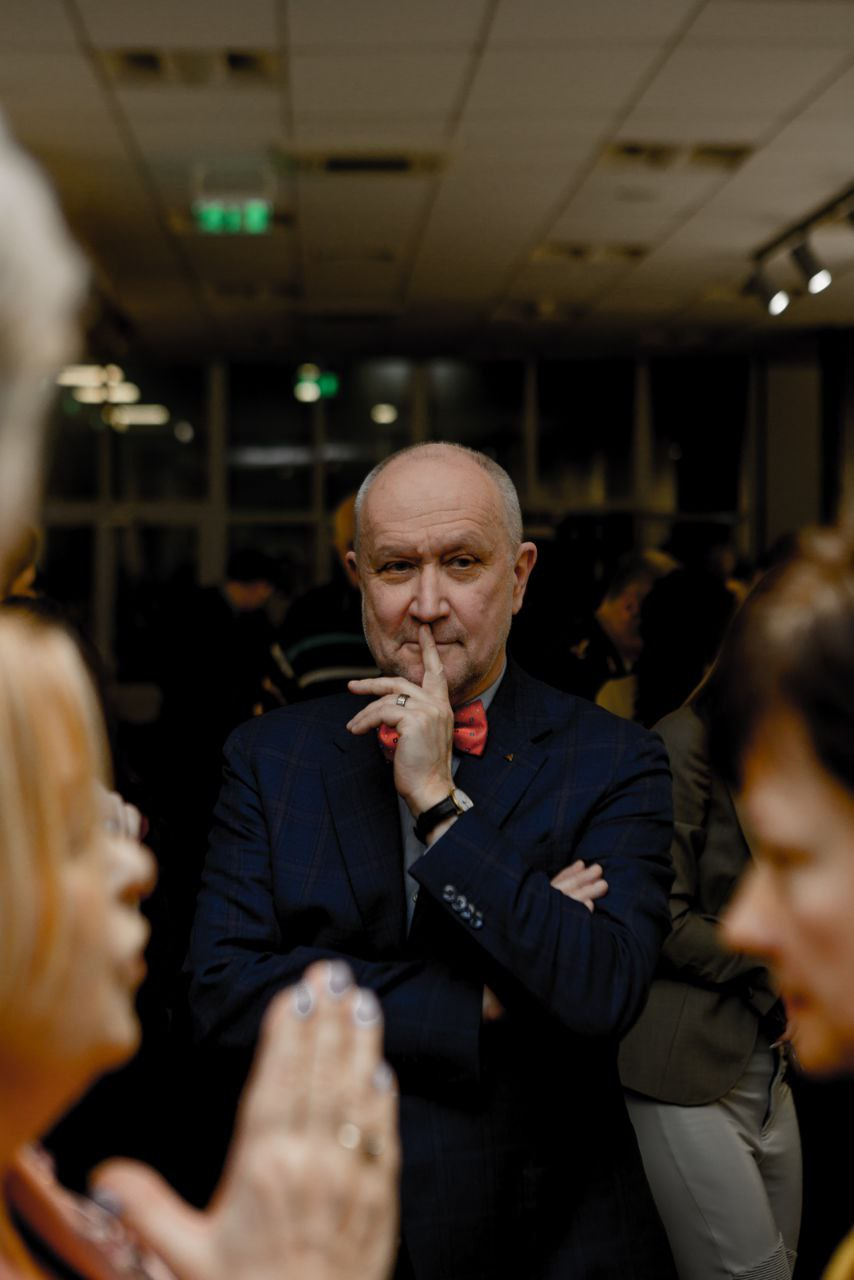
- Born: Danylo Borysovych Yanevsky; June 21, 1956 (age 70); Chernivtsi, Ukrainian SSR
- Known for: History, journalism
- Spouse: Marta Kolomyyets (died 2020)
- Children: Oleksandr, Heorhiy
- Awards: Honored Journalist of Ukraine 2005
- Website: YouTube

Danylo Borysovych Yanevsky (Ukrainian: Дани́ло Бори́сович Яне́вський; June 21, 1956, in Chernivtsi, USSR) is a Ukrainian historian, TV personality, and radio host. He was awarded Honored Journalist of Ukraine (2005), and Doctor of Historical Sciences of Ukraine (2008).

== Education ==
He studied 1974–1979 at Chernivtsi University, in the Faculty of history, where he graduated with honors. He was the husband of the journalist Marta Kolomyyets, who died in 2020.

After graduating he continued his studies as a researcher at the Institute of Ukrainian History of the National Academy of Sciences of Ukraine. Danylo's candidate's thesis (1988) is devoted to the peculiarities of the political, economic, and social crisis of 1917 based on the material of Ukrainian provinces within Russian Empire. His doctoral dissertation monograph "Political systems of Ukraine 1917–1920: creation attempts and causes of defeat" (2003) was recognized as the "Best Book of the Year."

== Research activities ==
- 1983–1993 – Institute of History of Ukraine.
- 1988 – Candidate of Historical Sciences (The proletariat and the bourgeoisie of Ukraine during the national crisis (September–October 1917).
- 2008 – Doctor of Historical Sciences (Political systems of Ukraine in 1917–1920: attempts to create and the reasons for defeat).

== Views ==
On Massacres in Volhynia and Eastern Galicia:

- it is a mutual massacre committed by former citizens of the Second Polish Republic, Roman Catholics and Orthodox; the consequence of the national policy of the two regimes – the Second RP and the Third Reich;
- legal responsibility, according to the then norms of international law, should be borne by the Nazi occupation administration;
- neither modern Ukraine (the successor to the USSR) nor its citizens bear historical, political, legal responsibility for that crime;
- discussants must clearly indicate which of the well-known Insurgent Armies we are talking about: Taras Bulba-Borovets, Serhij Kaczynski, Vasyl Ivakhiv (since May 1943 – VO «Zagrava») – Dmytro Klyachkivsky, who called his units the Ukrainian Insurgent Army, or Roman Shukhevych;
- says that Stepan Bandera pointed out to the spontaneity of the transition to insurgent forms of struggle of the Volyn regional Organisation of Ukrainian Nationalists.

He considers Bohdan Khmelnytsky an antihero of Ukraine, a man who brought catastrophe to Ukraine, and «a man who sold everyone who could be sold to everyone who would buy it; a man who spent the rest of his life legitimizing that quasi-state, that ugly entity in which people did not exist at all, but that Cossack rabble existed as the ruling class.»

He is quite critical of the proposed modern Ukrainian historiography and believes that it is «made in Moscow, it is made in other geographical centers, abundantly scattered on the political map of the world. We need, I personally need, to know the truth. I do not want to live in a lie, and therefore what I am doing is destroying myths that are called national, but which are actually completely destructive and turn our people into a herd. If a herd wants to remain a herd, let it remain; and I am a free person and I want to live in a free country.»

In July 2018 he supported an open letter from Ukrainian cultural figures to Ukrainian director Oleh Sentsov, who was imprisoned in Russia.

For 40 years Yanevsky has been researching the peculiarities of the formation and development of Ukraine as a synthesis of civilizations that existed on its territory. He is the author of more than 20 monographs, including a four-volume book on the history of the Masonic movement which had a significant impact on the formation of Ukraine as a unique civilizational entity. Other publications include his volumes of the "Ukraine Project" series – "portraits on the background of the era" of famous historical figures: M. Hrushevskyi, P. Skoropadskyi, S. Petlyura, E. Konovalets, A. Melnyk, S. Bandera, R. Shukhevich – which analyze peculiarities of their views on Ukraine as an independent state and the results of their political practices.

Yanevsky has been the creator, producer, and factual editor of several popular historical documentary films, including the multimedia project "Secrets of Ukrainian Independence," dedicated to the 30th anniversary of the declaration of Ukraine as an independent state. In 1992, he was a member of the Heraldic Commission of the Verkhovna Rada, on the recommendations of which the symbols of the new European independent state were established – the coat of arms, anthem, and flag of Ukraine.

== Journalism ==
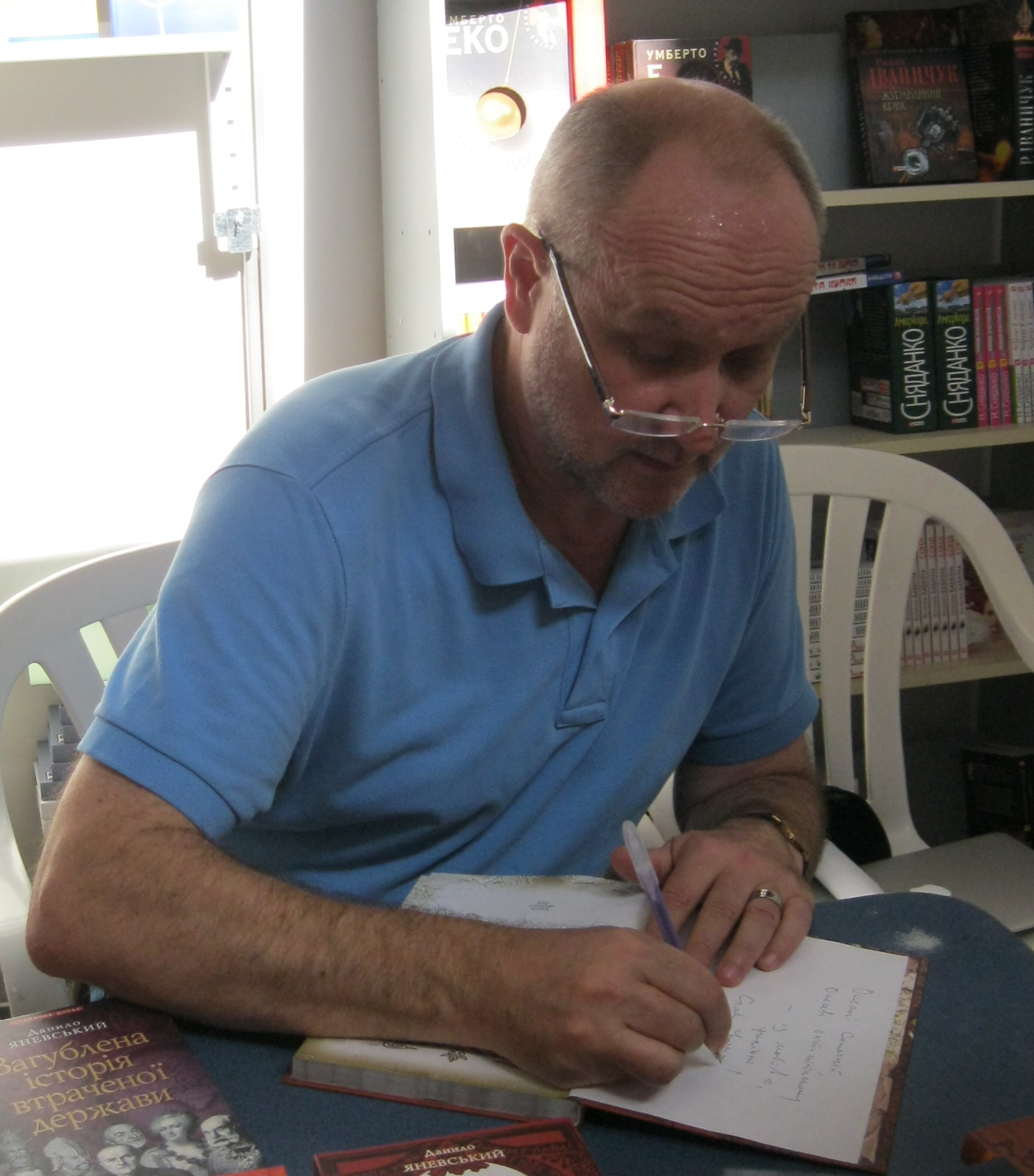
At the Publishers' Forum, Lviv, 2014

For 30 years, Danylo worked as an editor, correspondent, and presenter of television and radio programs: Radio Free Europe/Radio Liberty, Voice of America, 1+1, 5 Channel, Hromadske, and ZiK. In 2016 he co-founded the Ukrainian Media Network media platform.

- 1991–1996 – Journal of Philosophical and Sociological Thought – Parliamentary correspondent.
- 1992–1994 – Radio Free Europe/Radio Liberty, Russian Language Service – correspondent.
- 1995–1996 – Voice of America radio, Ukrainian Language Service correspondent.
- 1995 – National Democratic Institute (USA), consultant on political parties; Freedom House (USA), program coordinator for Ukrainian and Russian media.
- 1996–1997 – Nova Mova TV Company and Studio «1+1» TV and Radio Company – Editor-in-Chief of the Afterword TV Program.
- 1997–1999 – TV channel «1+1», producer of the morning broadcast, editor-in-chief, author and host of the TV program «Breakfast with „1+1"».
- 1999–2000 – TV channel «1+1», director of the Television Service of News, producer, author, host of the TV program «Against the Night».
- 1999–2000 – National University of Kyiv-Mohyla Academy – Dean-Organizer of the Department of Journalism.
- 2000–2002 – TRK Studio «1+1», host of the program «First Million» (English: Who Wants to Be a Millionaire?)
- 2000 – Radio Free Europe / Radio Liberty, Ukrainian Language Service, Kyiv bureau – director.
- 2000–2001 – «United Ukrainian Portal» (ukrop.com), editor.
- 1999–2001 – Ukrainian Greek Catholic Church, Government Relations Bureau, Officer.
- 2002–2013 – University of Economics and Law «KROK», Associate Professor.
- 2002–2004 – Radio Free Europe/Radio Liberty, Ukrainian service, Kyiv bureau – journalist.
- 2004–2008 – «5 Kanal», host of information programs, program «Maidan».
- 2010–2014 – Radio «UkieDrive» (Chicago, USA), editor, host of information programs; Independent Radio (Chicago, USA), correspondent, news anchor; Time and Events newspaper (Chicago, USA), columnist.
- 2013 and present – Ukrainian Catholic University, Professor.
- 2013–2014 – journalist, host of Hromadske. Until the end of July 2014, he was one of the members of the Hromadske NGO. He left voluntarily after he was suspended by the Editorial Board for three months for interrupting Human Rights Watch researcher Tanya Lokshina during a conversation after disagreeing with her claim that the conflict in Donbass – internal, not one in which there is interference from the outside.
- 2015–2016 – on the ZiK TV channel, host of the LifeCode project: Danylo Yanevsky.
- In 2016, he founded the NGO Ukrainian Media Network. Co-participant of Roman Skrypin's author's project – skrypin.ua.

== Books ==
- 1992 – Constitutional acts of Ukraine. Unknown Constitutions of Ukraine.– Kyiv: Abris.
- 2003 – Political systems of Ukraine 1917–1920. Attempts to create and causes of defeat.– Kyiv: Spirit and Letter. (Diploma «Best Book of the Year» in the nomination «Past»)
- 2005 – Chronicle of the «Orange Revolution». – Kharkiv: Folio. (Grand Prix of the International Book Festival «Book World – 2005» in the nomination «Opening of the Year» – «Mirror of Modernity»: «Best Ukrainian Book»: Nomination «Fiction», version of the magazine «Correspondent»).
- 2005 – The Face of the «Orange Revolution». – Kharkiv: Folio.
- 2005 – Ukraine: from Independence to Freedom.– Kharkiv: Folio. Photo by Ephraim Lukatsky.
- 2008 – The lost history of the lost state.– Kharkiv: Folio.
- 2009 – Project «Ukraine»: the secret of Mykhailo Hrushevsky.– Kharkiv: Folio.
- 2010 – Project «Ukraine»: an attempt by Pavlo Skoropadskyi.– Kharkiv: Folio.
- 2010 – Project «Ukraine»: the collapse of Symon Petliura.– Kharkiv: Folio.
- 2010 – Masons, National Socialists and Kyiv Politicum: Geopolitical Context (March 3, 1917 – January 15, 1918) .– Kyiv: [p. in.].
- 2012 – Ukraine Project: Hrushevsky. Skoropadskyi. Petliura.– Kharkiv: Folio.
- 2012 – Project «Ukraine»: a victim of the UPA, the mission of Roman Shukhevych.– Kharkiv: Folio.
- 2013 – Project «Ukraine»: June 30, 1941, action by Yaroslav Stetsko.– Kharkiv: Folio.
- 2014 – Project «Ukraine»: Known histories of our state.– Kharkiv: Folio.
- 2015 – Project «Ukraine»: Famous histories of our state: continuation.– Kharkiv: Folio.
- 2015 – Roman Shukhevych.– Kharkiv: Folio.
- 2017–2019 – Ukraine Project: Architects, foremen, TT workers. 1–4.– Kharkiv: Folio.

== Films ==
Author of the idea / producer / scientific editor of the films:

- "Ukraine: Faith, Hope, Love" (directed by V. Shmotolokh).
- "Patriarch. The Life of Josyf Slipyj" (directed by O. Frolov).
- "Arnold Margolin is an outstanding Ukrainian and a Jew" (2003, Dovzhenko NKHF commissioned by the US Embassy in Ukraine. Scriptwriter and director – O. Muratov).
- "Orange slice. Treaty of Brest-Litovsk of 1918 " (3 episodes) (directed by I. Kobrin).

== Awards ==
- 1996 as a member of the team "Afterwords" victory in the nomination «Television Program of the Year» in the national competition "Man of the Year – 1996"
- 2005 the title of "Honored Journalist of Ukraine"

== Sources ==
External videos
- Antipods on YouTube // ISLND TV.

- Petro Yakovenko – Is there an exit from a history labyrinth?, Kyiv, 1991, No. 3. – С. 80–83.
- Political Ukraine today
