= Maksym Butkevych =

Ukrainian activist (born 1977)

- Максим Буткевич
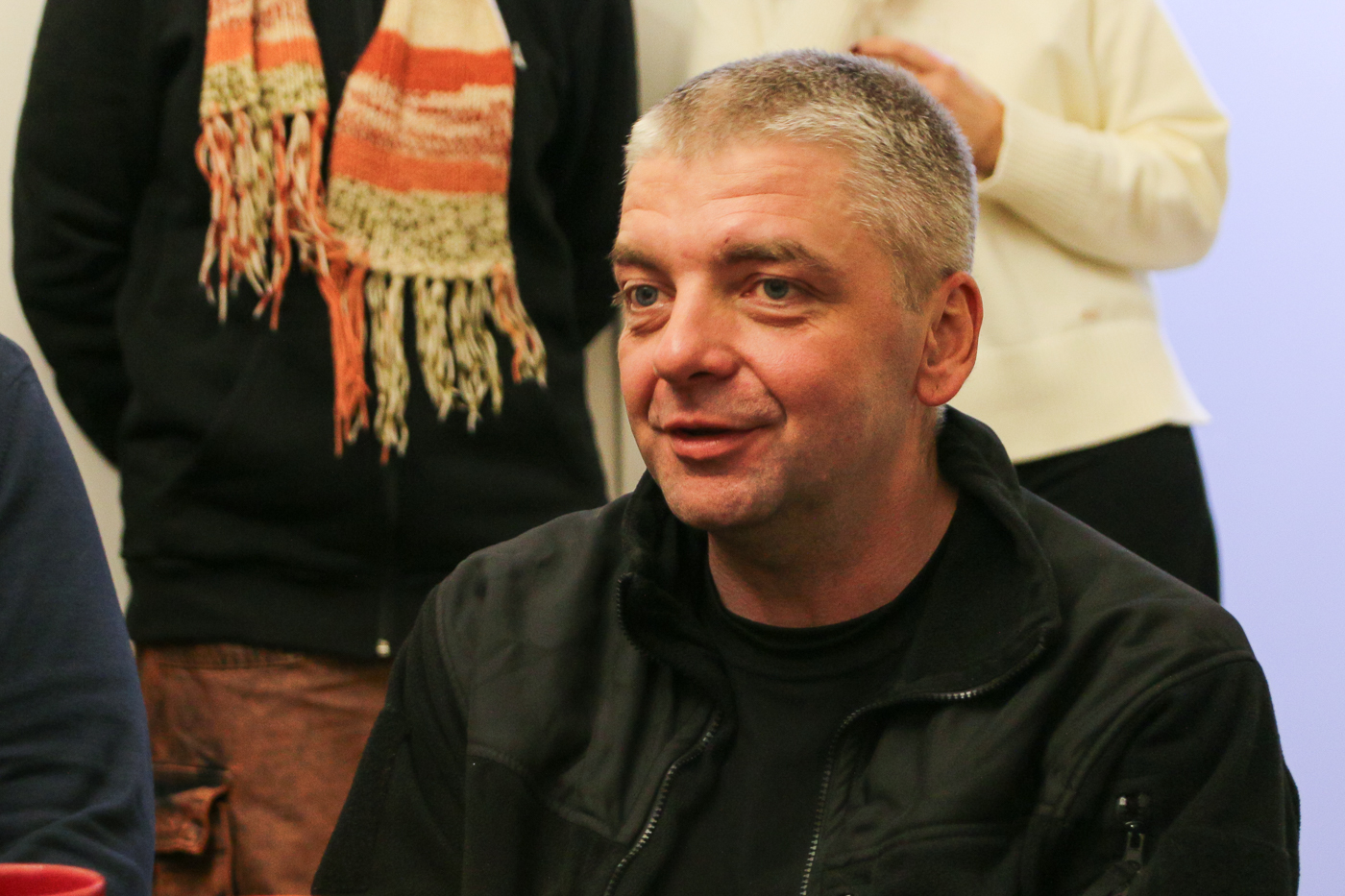
- Maksym Butkevych (November 2024)
- Born: 16 July 1977 (age 49); Kyiv, Ukrainian SSR, Soviet Union
- Education: University of Kyiv; University of Sussex
- Occupations: Human rights defender, journalist
- Movement: Human rights movement

Maksym Oleksandrovych Butkevych (Ukrainian: Максим Олександрович Буткевич, born 16 July 1977) is a Ukrainian human rights activist, journalist and member of the Ukrainian military.

== Biography ==
Maksym Oleksandrovych Butkevych was born in Kyiv, into an intellectual family. Since childhood, he dreamed of being an astronaut, but doctors discovered that he had heart problems.

=== Education ===
While still a school student, in 1990, he declared his support for Ukrainian independence and participated in his first protest, establishing a non-violent strike committee at his school during the Revolution on Granite. After graduating from secondary school, he studied at the Ukrainian Humanities Lyceum.

He entered the Faculty of Philosophy of the Taras Shevchenko National University of Kyiv and graduated with a degree in philosophy (specialising in social philosophy and the philosophy of history). In his student years, He was a prominent anarchist and anti-fascist activist participating in the student trade union Direct Action. From 1998 to 1999, Butkevych worked as a methodologist at the Department of Cultural Studies and Archeology at the National University of Kyiv-Mohyla Academy.

During his education, he graduated from the military department and received the rank of lieutenant in the reserves.

Later, he studied at the University of Sussex in the United Kingdom, where he received a Master of Arts in Anthropology (specializing in the anthropology of development and social transformation).

=== Career in journalism ===
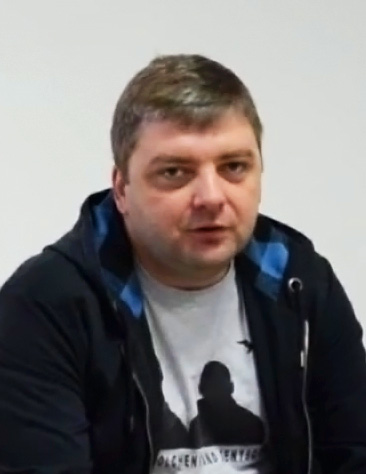
Butkevych in 2015

Maksym's career as a journalist began in 1999 as a correspondent and editor at the International Information Department of STB TV channel. Later, in 2001, he moved to the international news department of TSN on the 1+1 TV channel.

In 2003, Butkevych moved to the United Kingdom, where he worked as a journalist for the Ukrainian Section of the BBC World Service in London. At the end of his 18-month contract, he remained a freelance journalist for local news websites and radio stations.

In 2006, he returned to Ukraine, where he became a journalist at the International Information Department of TSN, and the following year – a special correspondent for the international department of NIS (Inter TV channel).

=== Human rights activism ===
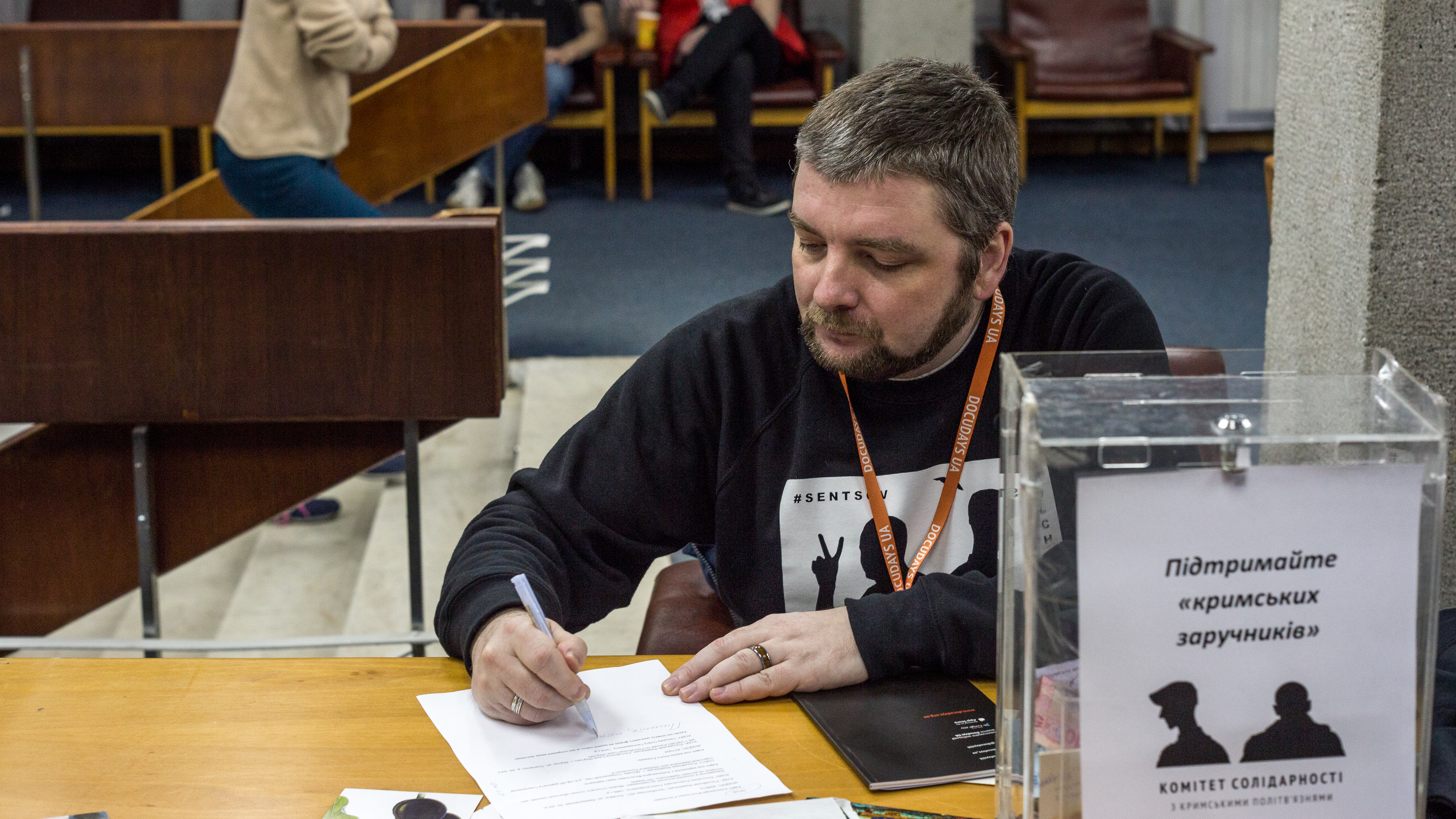
Butkevych at the 14th Docudays UA human rights film Festival in Kyiv on 25 March 2017

After leaving the BBC, Butkevych stayed in Brighton for a while, where he studied at the University of Sussex and became involved in the anarchist and anti-globalization movement.

In 2008, Maksym Butkevych became a co-founder and co-coordinator of the non-governmental initiative "No Borders", which monitors the human rights situation in Central Asia and other regions, the right to asylum and refugee rights in Ukraine, and is involved in combating xenophobia and racism. Within "No Borders", Maksym worked on the protection of refugees, internally displaced persons and stateless persons, and studied hate speech.

In 2009–2012, he participated in the work of the New Ukraine School of Professional Journalism. At the same time, he conducted trainings and gave public lectures at the Kyiv-Mohyla Academy.

For several years, he worked as a public relations specialist for the United Nations High Commissioner for Refugees in Eastern Europe. He was also an advisor to the UNHCR Office.

In 2012, together with Tetiana Pechonchyk and Maryna Hovorukhina, he founded the Human Rights Centre ZMINA.

In 2013, he co-founded Hromadske Radio, where he worked as a journalist and presenter for two years; during the Maidan protests, he was active in civic human rights protest initiatives.

Since March 2014, Butkevych has been involved as a coordinator in the Resource Center for Assistance to Internally Displaced Persons, a joint project of civic initiatives that provide assistance to internally displaced persons and the Secretariat of the Ukrainian Parliament Commissioner for Human Rights. The aim of the initiative was to help IDPs from Crimea and Donbas: to connect those who provide housing and those who need it, and to provide food, clothing, medicine, and counselling.

He also became an active member of the Committee of Solidarity with the Kremlin's Hostages, actively fighting for the release of Ukrainian political prisoners, including Hennadii Afanasiev, Oleh Sentsov, and Oleksandr Kolchenko.

He was also a member of the Public Council under the Ministry of Internal Affairs (2008–2010), a member of the National Committee of Amnesty International in Ukraine (2007–2008), a participant/trainer of the National Educational Program "Understanding Human Rights". In addition, he moderated DocuDays UA screenings and events, and advised the Alliance for Public Health (Ukraine).

=== War and capture ===
Despite his long history of anti-militarism and pacifism, at the beginning of the 2022 Russian invasion of Ukraine, Maksym Butkevych volunteered to fight in the Armed Forces of Ukraine. He posted the following message on Facebook:

Unfortunately, I have to put my refugee assistance, humanitarian and human rights activities on hold. I think you can understand why from the photo [...] There are times when you have to be ready to defend what is important – I firmly believe in that. And the rest – after the victory.

In June 2022, Butkevych was captured near the Russian-held towns of Zolote and Hirske in Luhansk Oblast. Russian state media published a video of the interrogation. Subsequently, the Russian Ministry of Defence confirmed that Butkevych was a prisoner of war and as of 9 August was in the Russian-occupied Luhansk region. Due to his support for IDPs during the war in Donbas and because of his history as a journalist for the BBC, Butkevych was respectively labelled as a "neo-Nazi" and a "British spy" by the Russian media.

On 10 March 2023, Russia's Investigative Committee announced that Butkevych was sentenced to 13 years in prison. Butkevych was charged with war crimes against civilians, specifically firing a grenade launcher at civilians in Severodonetsk. The court ignored evidence to the fact that at the incriminated date of the alleged attack Butkevych was not present anywhere near the town.

The Joint Center for the Search and Release of Prisoners of War and human rights activists became engaged in working to free him.

On 22 August 2023 appeal court in Moscow upheld the sentence of 13 years. Butkevych was not present at the court hearing, and he only had a chance to talk over a video link from prison in Luhansk. According to his lawyer, Butkevych was forced to confession using torture and after he confessed he confirmed the tortures stopped.

In a 190-person prisoner swap between Ukraine and Russia, Butkevych was released on 18 October 2024.

=== Awards ===
On 29 September 2025 Maksym Butkevych was awarded with the prestigious Václav Havel Human Rights Prize 2025.

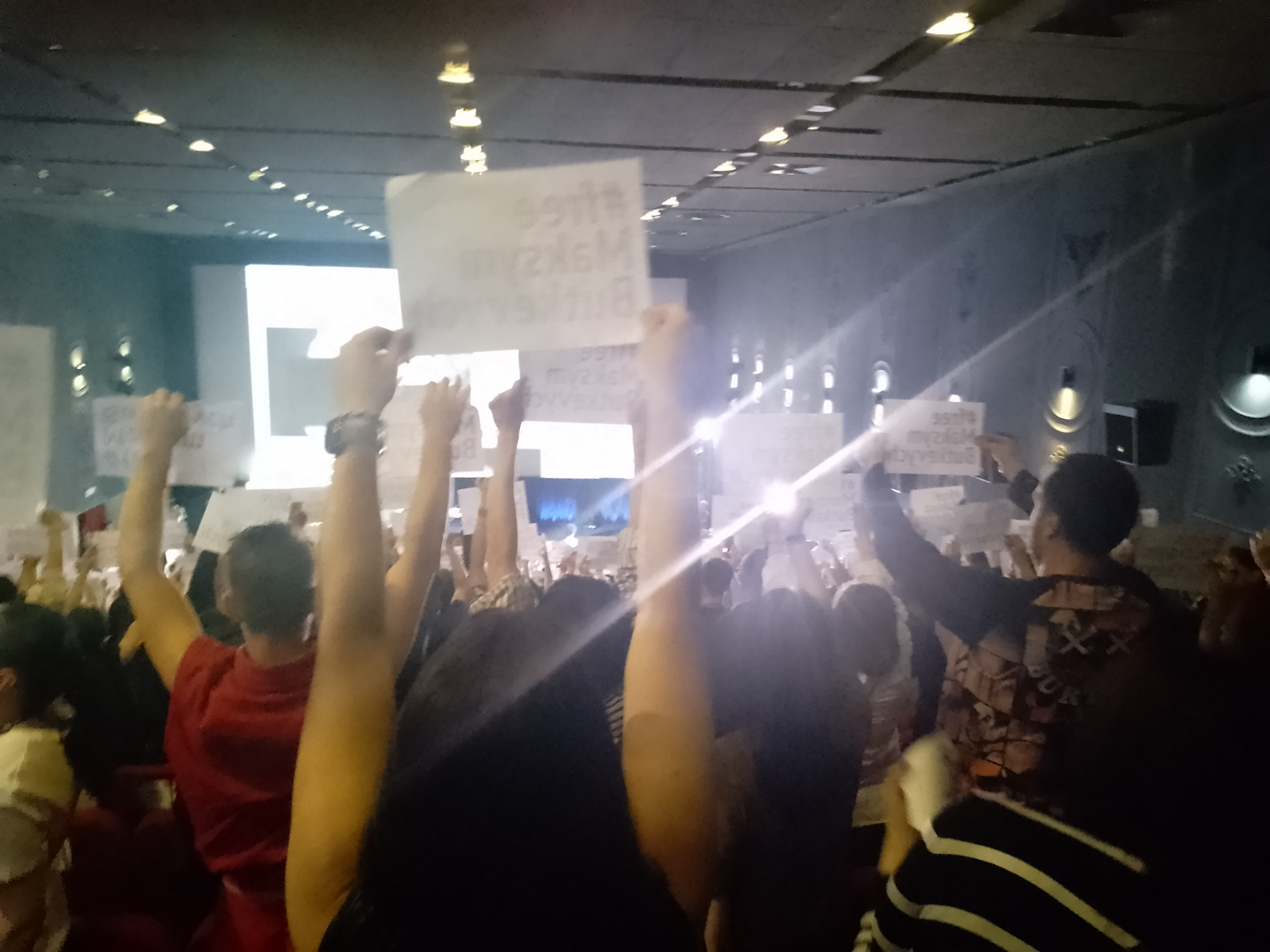
Calls to free Butkevych at the Docudays UA festival (June 2023)

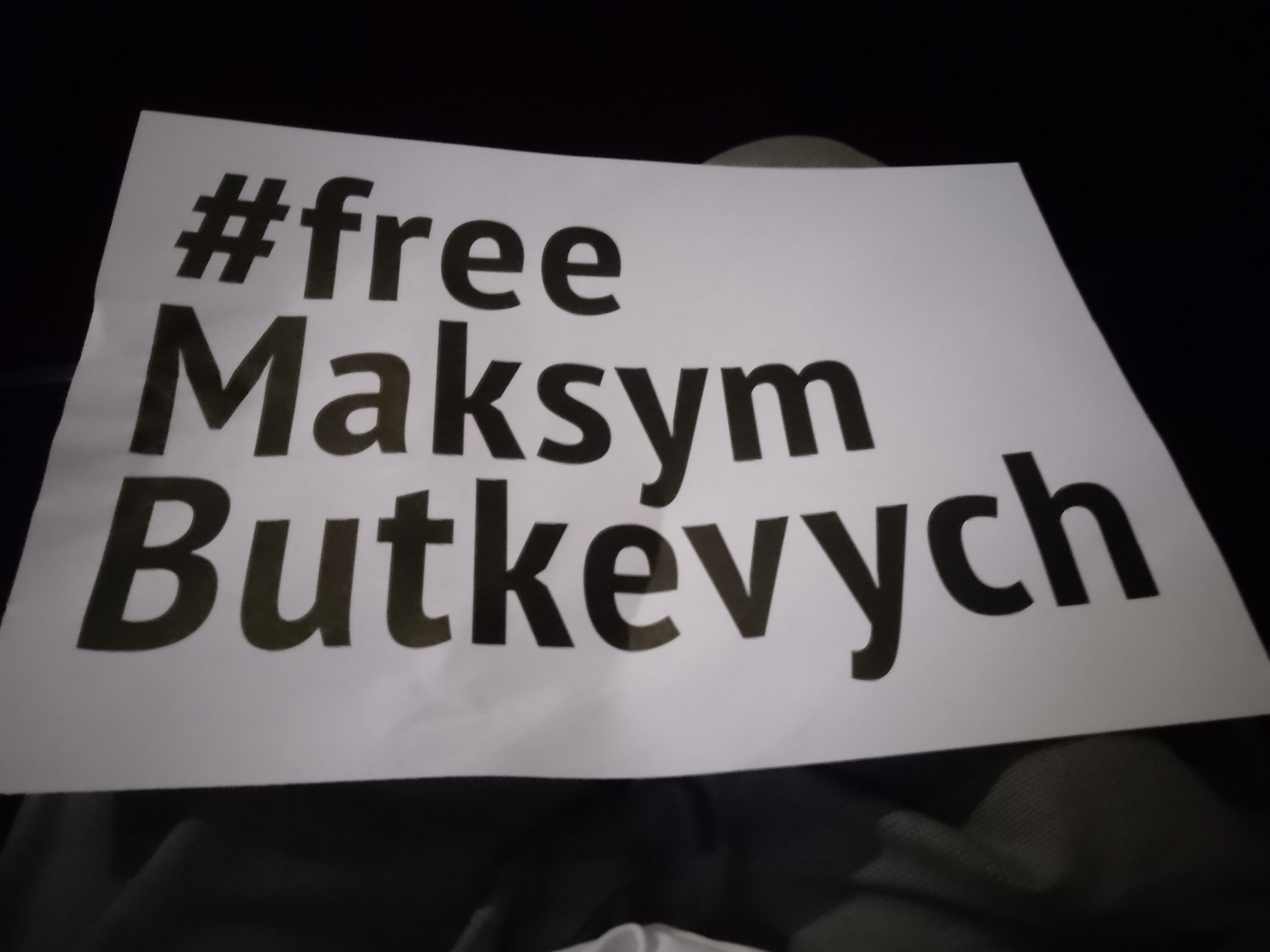

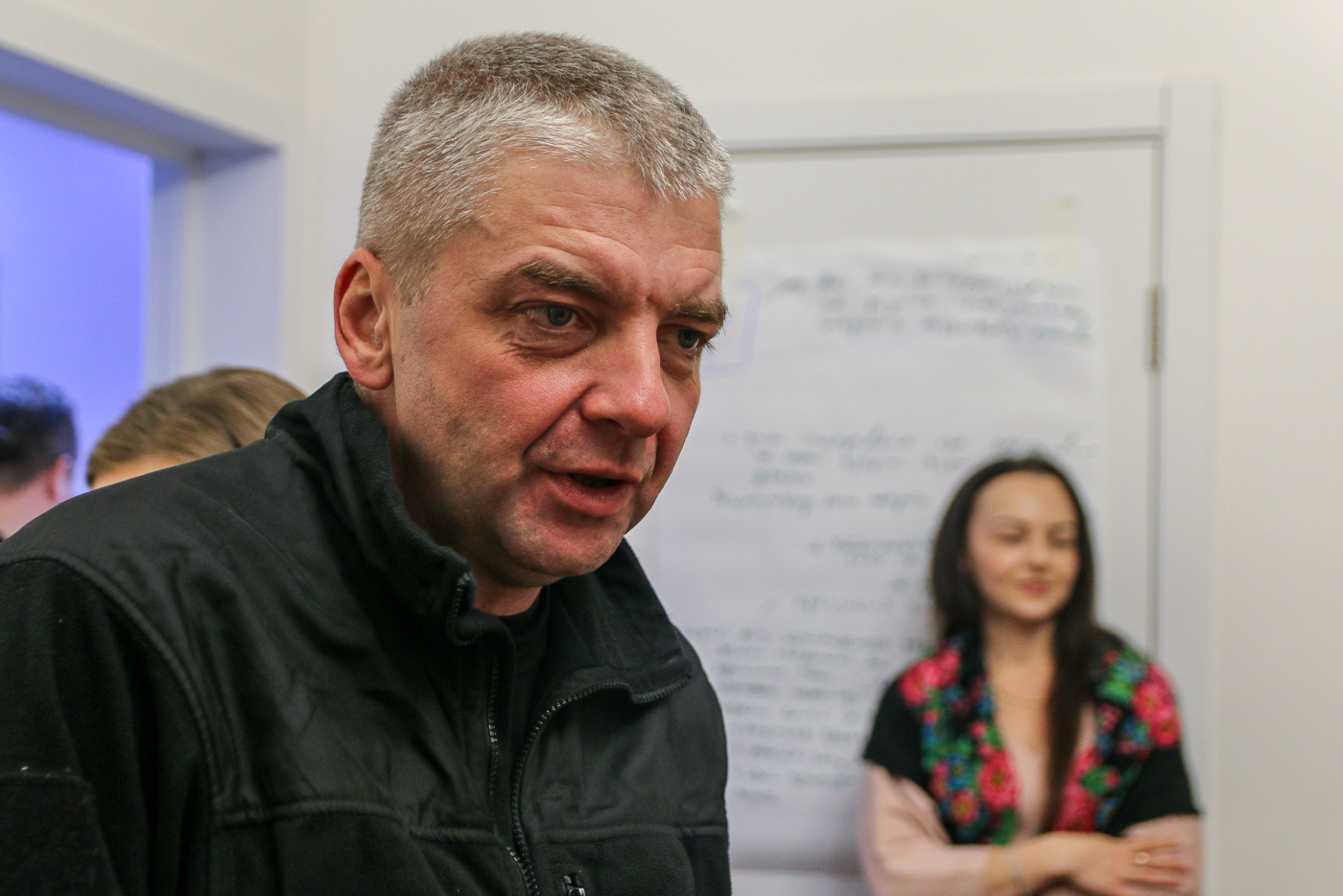
Butkevych after being released (November 2024)

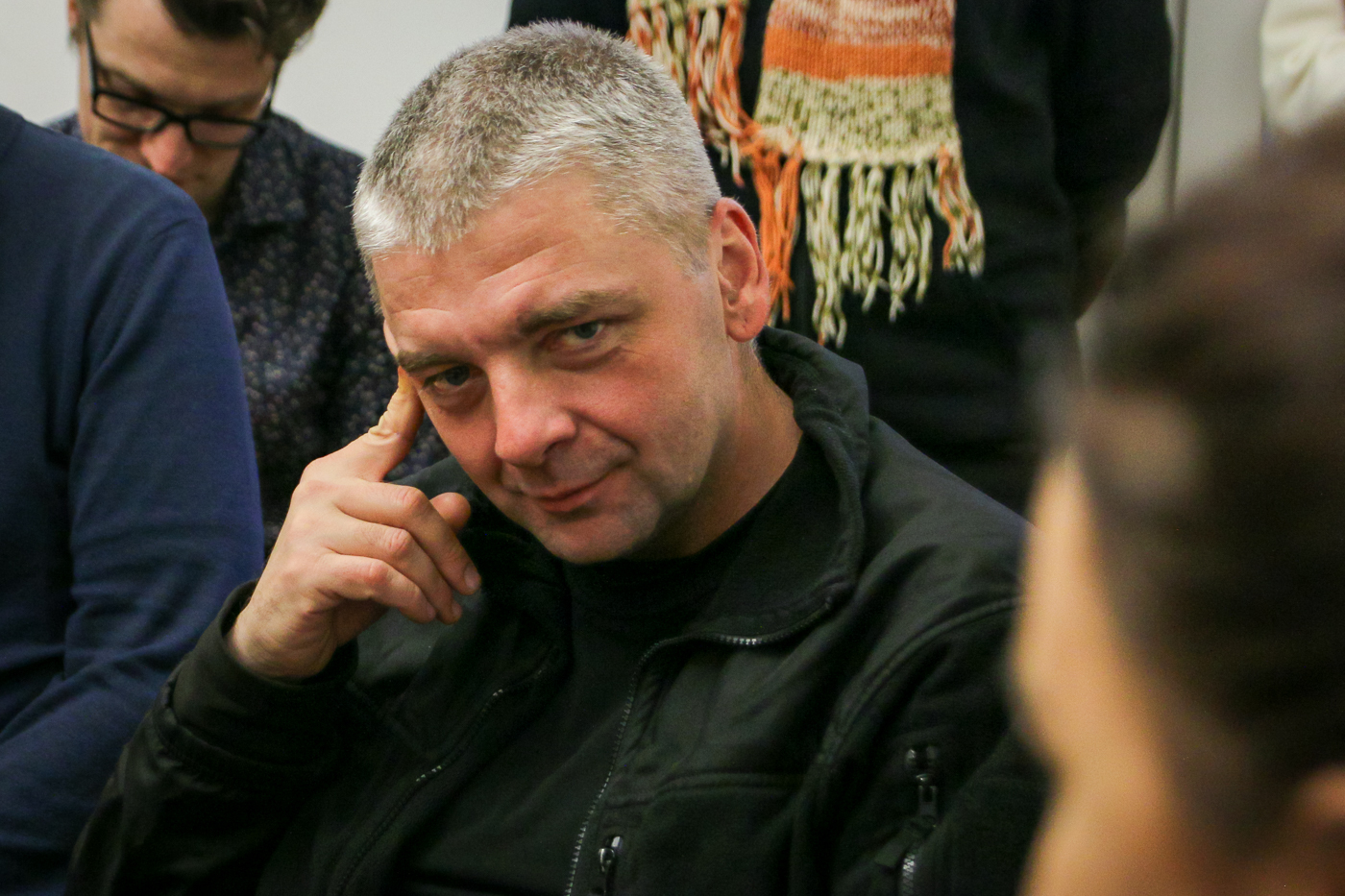

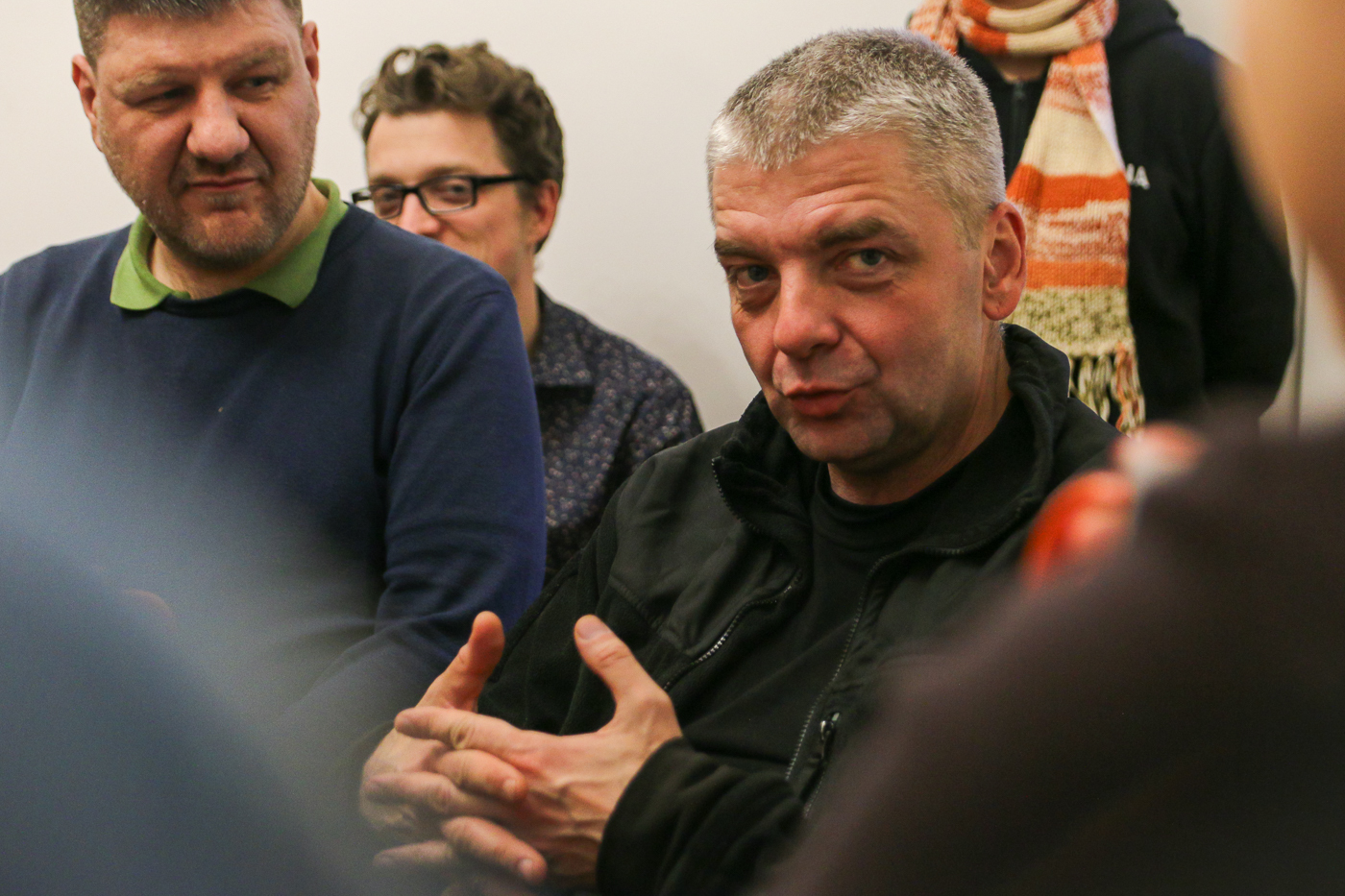
