= Roman Skrypin =

Ukrainian journalist (born 1973)

- Роман Скрипін
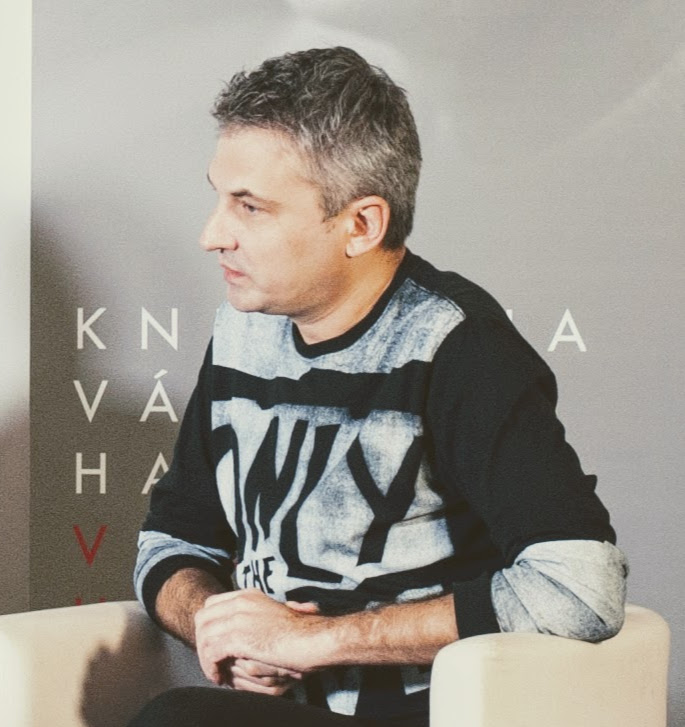
- Skrypin in 2016
- Born: 27 May 1973 (age 53); Poltava, Ukrainian SSR, Soviet Union
- Occupation: Journalist
- Years active: 1990–present

Roman Andriiovych Skrypin (Ukrainian: Роман Андрійович Скрипін; born 27 May 1973) is a Ukrainian media manager, journalist, television host, a chief of the Ukrainian independent media union.

== Biography ==
He was born on 27 May 1973 in Poltava, Ukrainian SSR of the Soviet Union. He is married and has a daughter. Before enrolling to the Kyiv University, Skrypin was a journalist-trainee for the Poltava newspaper Komsomolets Poltavshchyny in 1990. While studying in the Institute of Journalism of Kyiv University in 1991–1997, Skrypin worked for number of newspapers and television studios and channels.

- 1991–1992 – journalist for a newspaper "Ukrayina Moloda"
- 1992–1993 – freelancer for "Hart" television studio
- 1993–1995 – journalist for the Center of creative television
- 1995–1996 - co-owner, journalist-producer for the private firm "Agency of producers"

Soon after the graduation, in 1996–1998 Skrypin worked as a reporter and chief – editor of a news block and hosting the program "Dobroho ranku, Ukrayina" on the state television channel UTN (today - Pershyi Natsionalnyi). Since September 1998, he has been working as an anchor–editor for a news program "Vikna. Press digest" on STB television channel. In January 1999, his program was renamed to "Vikna. At the midnight", while also he was hosting program and "Mediaclub". Due to the total political censorship on Ukrainian TV channels as far as on STB also, Skrypin had to leave in 2002.

In 2002 he joined the new radio-broadcasting project on internet led by Andriy Kulykov "Hromadske Radio".

During the parliamentary proceedings, which were dedicated to the situation of the freedom of speech in Ukraine, Skrypin had appeared with his colleague Andriy Shevchenko. He stated authoritatively about non-permissibility of the censorship and brought an accusation against the existing President Leonid Kuchma. Skrypin accused him in being the one and the first who made such unbearable conditions, when the journalist can't work by specialty.

Skrypin is the co-author of the Channel 5 so-called "true news". He started to work from the very beginning until June 2006 as chief-editor and also as a television host of the summarized program "Chas". Skrypin resigned in June 2006 due to a reason of development absence and also because there was an absence of straight scheme of decision-making. Among other things, the new chief-editor was appointed without any discussions with Skrypin as that time chief-editor.

Starting on 14 August 2006 and until 31 January 2008 he worked as a media director, "RBC-Ukraine" inform agency (affiliate of the RBC Information Systems). After that Skrypin was a radio host of the "Radio Free Europe/Radio Liberty" Ukrainian Service (RFE/RL).

Starting on 19 January 2009, he became the author and the host of television program "Truth of Roman Skrypin" at TVi television channel. On 23 February he was elected as a chief of the Ukrainian Independent media union. There were 31 votes for his candidature among 57 delegates attended the 2nd congress of the Independent media union, which took place in the House of scientists, Kyiv, Ukraine. On 2 April Roman Skrypin headed informational service of TVi and eventually became the vice editor-chief at "TVi" for Yevgeniy Kiselyov.

In September 2012 Skrypin got the idea to start an internet television channel. This idea eventually became Hromadske.TV. After the April 2013 ownership dispute at TVi 31 journalists resigned from TVi on 29 April 2013, they believed as TVi employees they could not anymore "guarantee our audience to provide objective and unbiased information". Many of them eventually joined Hromadske.TV.
