= Ukraina Society =

The Ukraina Society, Ukraine Society, or the Society for Cultural Relations with Ukrainians Abroad, was a Ukrainian civil society funded and controlled by the KGB, established in 1960 in Kyiv on the basis of the republican department of the Soviet Committee "For Return to the Homeland". It aimed to influence the Ukrainian diaspora and present the Soviet Union in a positive light. According to the New York Times, it was headquartered in "a yellow-brick apartment building near the bluffs of the Dnieper River in Kiev." The Society published two newspapers, The News from Ukraine, and Visti z Ukrayiny. These newspapers on several occasions outed the identities of closeted Nazis hiding in Ukraine.

On July 4, 1969, Society board member Vasily Stepanovich Ryvak was arrested in Lvov.

== See also ==
- Andriy Kulykov
