= Tonis (Canada) =

Canadian Ukrainian-language TV channel

- Country: Canada
- Broadcast area: National
- Headquarters: Toronto, Ontario

Programming
- Picture format: 4:3 (480i, SDTV)

Ownership
- Owner: Ethnic Channels Group

History
- Launched: June 23, 2004
- Closed: February 23, 2009
- Former names: Inter+ (2004 - 2005); Channel 5 (2005 - 2007); 1+1 International (2007 - 2008)

Tonis was a Canadian Ukrainian-language pay television channel owned by Ethnic Channels Group (ECG) with its name licensed from the owners of the Ukrainian television channel, Tonis.

The channel broadcast a variety of programming primarily from Tonis including news, sports, cultural programs, and talk shows.

== History ==
=== Inter+ ===
In September 2003, Ethnic Channels Group was granted approval from the Canadian Radio-television and Telecommunications Commission (CRTC) to launch a television channel called Ukrainian TV One, described as "a national ethnic Category 2 specialty television service providing programming primarily in the Ukrainian language."

On June 23, 2004, ECG launched Inter+ using the Ukrainian TV One licence. Inter+ broadcast programming from Inter+, an international channel broadcasting programming from Inter.

=== Channel 5 ===
In September 2005, ECG re-branded Inter+ as Channel 5 (in Cyrillic: “5 канал”), broadcasting programming from Channel 5, a national news network from Ukraine.

=== 1+1 International ===
In June 2006, in its effort to boost subscription to the channel, ECG re-branded Channel 5 as 1+1 International which broadcast programming from 1+1 International, a Ukrainian-language TV channel from Ukraine. 1+1 International, itself, was an international channel broadcasting programming from Studio 1+1 for Ukrainian communities outside Ukraine. The channel broadcast a variety of programming including news, documentaries, talk shows, and more.

=== Tonis ===
In the fall of 2008, the Ukrainian channel, 1+1 International, became unavailable in North America. By that time, Roger Communications, the largest Canadian television service provider at the time, had dropped the Canadian channel from its line-up due to low subscriptions. As a result of both of these situations, ECG, yet again, rebranded the channel as Tonis (in Cyrillic: “Тоніс”). The channel broadcast programming from Tonis, an information and educational channel from Ukraine.

In February 2009, both Aurora Cable and Telus TV, the only other carriers of the channel at the time, dropped the channel from their line-ups, rendering the channel no longer available.

== Logos ==
2004 - 2005

2005 - 2007

2007 - 2008

2008 - 2009
