= Hromadske Radio =

Non-governmental internet public radio in Ukraine

Громадське радіо
- Ukraine
- Frequency: § See list

Programming
- Format: Public broadcasting, podcast

Ownership
- Owner: Andriy Kulykov (chairman)

History
- Founded: March 2002 (original iteration); 1 December 2013 (present iteration)
- Last air date: 18 February 2005 (original iteration)

Links
- Website: hromadske.radio/en

Hromadske Radio (Ukrainian: Громадське радіо, lit. 'civic radio') is a non-governmental, internet-based public broadcasting radio service in Ukraine. It was initially created in 2002 by journalist Oleksandr Kryvenko (1963–2003). Despite the popularity of the website, the project was closed in 2005, as it failed to receive a government license for broadcasting. Hromadske Radio was considered one of the first independent and objective platforms in Ukraine, where representatives of different political forces can share their opinions without censorship.

In 2013 a new initiative group of professional journalists recreated Hromadske Radio with the same name and the same goals. Hromadske Radio was started as a podcast, later transitioning to an internet radio service. In July 2015 Hromadske Radio won the competition of the National Council on Television and Radio Broadcasting of Ukraine, giving the station an ability to broadcast in some cities in Donetsk and Luhansk oblasts and in Kyiv.

== History of the project ==
From its foundation in March 2002, Hromadske Radio sought a license for broadcasting, but was unsuccessful, owing to the opposition of president Leonid Kuchma's government. A significant part of the radio content (talk shows, programs, news) was spread on the Internet as podcasts. From autumn 2004 to February 2005 Hromadske Radio broadcast for one hour per week in Kyiv and regional centers using the transmitters of Radio Era FM.

Hromadske Radio closed on 18 February 2005 because of the lack of funding.

=== Original team ===
Among the journalists who worked at Hromadske Radio in 2002-2005 were:

- Oleksandr Kryvenko
- Serhiy Rakhmanin
- Roman Skrypin
- Zurab Alasania
- Danylo Yanevsky
- Mykola Veresen
- Roman Vybranovskyy
- Dmytro Krykun
- Oleksandr Chernenko
- Taras Kuzmov
- Mykhailo Shamanov
- Natalia Riaba
- Maria Vasilyeva
- Ihor Soldatenko
- Yevhen Hlibovytsky
- Angela Rudenko
- Mykhailo Barbara
- Olha Pyrozhko
- Dmytro Drabyk
- Natalia Ivchenko

=== Reestablishment ===
The new online project of Hromadske Radio was announced in July 2013. On 21 August 2013 some members of the initiative group launched the first podcast, where they explained why they decided to reorganise Hromadske Radio. The first broadcast was on 1 December 2013 at the waves of Europa Plus Ukraine. In this program journalists Julia Burkovska, Denis Kubryak and Andriy Kulykov led the marathon "Euromaidan on-line".

In 2013 Oleksandr Buzyuk was chairman of Hromadske Radio. On 14 September 2015 he was replaced by Andriy Kulykov.

The project currently uses the logo of the first Hromadske Radio with the permission of the International Renaissance Foundation, which is the main donor of the project. Hromadske Radio also uses a part of the equipment, which remained after the first project of Hromadske Radio.

== Broadcasting ==
On 1 December 2013 Hromadske Radio started broadcasting on the waves of Europa Plus. The first air was launched to the Euromaidan events in Kyiv.

Since February 2014 Hromadske Radio broadcasts daily two-hour talk shows "Hromadska khvylia" ("Civic wave"). Originally, the program was broadcast on the waves of Channel 1 of Ukrainian Radio.

At the end of 2014 Hromadske Radio started producing news (called "The Chronicles of Donbass"). These news are broadcast for residents of the eastern regions of Ukraine on the waves of partner's radio stations and later on the own frequencies of Hromadske Radio.

After winning in July 2015 at the competition of the National Council on Television and Radio Broadcasting of Ukraine, Hromadske Radio has been able to broadcast in some cities in Donetsk and Luhansk oblasts and in Kyiv.

On 1 November, Hromadske Radio presented two new daily talk shows called Kyiv-Donbas. Programs are created for residents of Donetsk and Luhansk regions and IDPs. The editors of these programs became experienced journalists Mykhaylo Kukin and Tetyana Troschynska. Two-hour talk shows in Russian are aimed to cover the most relevant events in Donetsk and Luhansk, and are addressed to everyone who wants to know more about the situation in the east of Ukraine. Hromadske Radio broadcasts 24 hours per day, five hours of which are broadcast in Russian.

During November and December 2015, Hromadske Radio was launched in Donetsk and Luhansk oblasts. Namely, in Kramatorsk — 103, 2 MHz, Krasnoarmiysk — 99,6 MHz, Volnovakha — 103, 8 MHz and 66,05 VHF, Starobilsk — 90.2 MHz, Bilovodsk — 92.6 MHz, Bilolutsk — 100.0 MHz, Zorynivka — 103.7 MHz, Shyroke —101.8 MHz.

=== Internet radio ===
Hromadske Radio also works as an internet radio service, and creates podcasts in different languages (Ukrainian, Russian, English, French, Polish). More than 500,000 people have listened to Hromadske Radio on SoundCloud since August 2013. Most of listeners of Hromadske Radio are from Ukraine, Russia, USA, Canada, Germany, Italy and Poland.

== Funding ==
Estimated budget for 2014 was ₴2,000,000, the final budget was UAH 2,300,000. The main source of funding Hromadske Radio is donations from institutions and private donations. Some programs are created by the financial support of international organizations and foundations from Europe and the USA. Donors who donate to Hromadske Radio share their ideology and editorial principles, thus they guarantee interference in editorial policy of the radio. Every year Hromadske Radio reports about their expenses to the Audit Committee and publishes relevant information on its website.

Besides, Hromadske Radio raises money via crowdfunding platforms. During the last crowdfunding campaigns, Hromadske Radio raised over ₴100,000 with the platform Big Idea. These money helped Hromadske Radio to create 36 podcasts about art, culture and self-development. At the beginning of 2014, Hromadske Radio raised over $17,000 on Indiegogo. It allowed Hromadske Radio to rent the studio and special equipment.

== Frequencies ==
- Kyiv - 70.4 VHF
- Kramatorsk - 103.2 FM
- Pokrovsk- 99.6 FM
- Volnovakha - 103.8 FM and 66.05 VHF
- Starobilsk - 90.2 FM
- Bilovodsk- 92.6 FM
- Bilolutsk - 100.0 FM
- Zorynivka - 103.7 FM
- Shyroke- 101.8 FM

== See also ==
- Ukrainian Radio
- National Public Broadcasting Company of Ukraine
