= Vadym Karpyak =

Ukrainian journalist and radio host (born 1977)

- Вади́м Карп'я́к
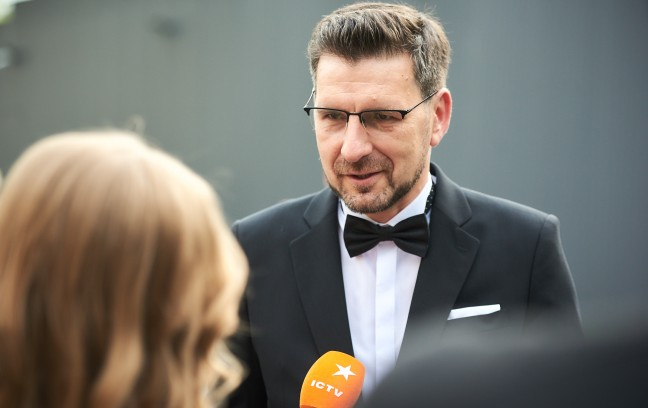
- Born: Vadym Dmytrovych Karpyak; 27 January 1977 (age 49); Kolomyia, Ukrainian SSR, Soviet Union
- Education: National University of Kyiv-Mohyla Academy
- Occupations: Journalist; radio and television host
- Spouse: Tetiana Pushnova

Vadym Dmytrovych Karpyak (Note: An alternative spelling of his last name is "Karpiak.") (Ukrainian: Вади́м Дми́трович Карп'я́к; born 20 December 1986) is a Ukrainian journalist and radio and television host, widely recognised for his significant contributions to Ukrainian media. Formerly the host of The Freedom of Speech on ICTV, Karpyak now presents a distinctive interview programme on Suspilne, where he has assembled an impressive roster of guests. His show has featured ministers, senior law enforcement officials, leaders of the Verkhovna Rada and the Servant of the People party, and even Andriy Yermak himself.

== Early life and education ==
Vadym Dmytrovych Karpyak was born on 27 January 1977, in the city of Kolomyia and is the elder of two children. He first attended Kolomyi Lyceum No. 1 named after Vasyl Stefanyk, but after Ukraine gained independence, the local gymnasium was renovated, and he completed his studies there in 1994. That same year, he enrolled in the Faculty of Humanities at the National University of Kyiv-Mohyla Academy. In 1998, he earned a bachelor's degree in cultural theory, and in 2001, he completed a master's degree in political science at the same university.

== Career ==
Karpyak began working in the media while still a university student. In 1997, he started doing live broadcasts on Radio Stolitsa's music channel. Two years later, in 1999, he became the executive editor of Snidanok z 1+1, a position he held until 2001. During this time, he was also developing his own business, FDR Media, which has been distributing Ukrainian music to television and radio stations since 1999. Alongside his work as a chief editor for television, he took part in various cultural and media initiatives across both central and regional outlets, serving as a host, editor, or co-organiser while acting as program director.

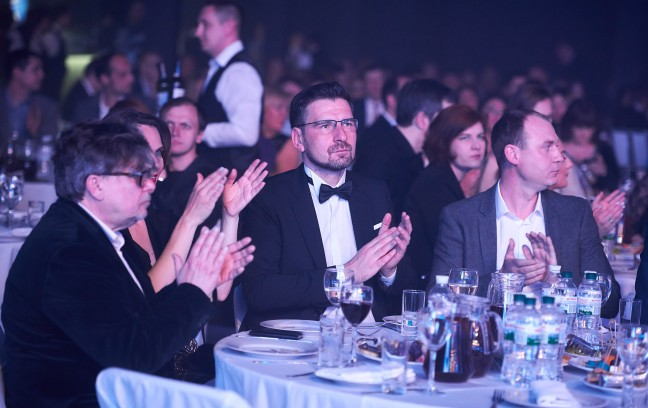
Vadym Karpyak and friends at Teletriumph 2018, which was held without a television broadcast at Stereo Plaza. The Teletriumphs are the national television awards of Ukraine.

Since 2013, Karpyak has been anchoring live broadcasts for the newly established 112 Ukraine television channel. In 2016, he began hosting the political talk show Svoboda Slova on the ICTV channel. Since 2018, he has also served as the host and moderator of the Arsenal Book Festival and as a member of the programme board for the Book Forum Lviv. Additionally, he has hosted his own show, On Law and Grace, on UA:PBC's Radio Culture since 2019, and has worked as a library selection specialist for the Ukrainian Book Institute.

During the 2019 presidential race, Svoboda Slova under Karpyak’s stewardship became a heavily managed platform for political parties to promote themselves, featuring lengthy, uninterrupted statements—such as Anatoliy Hrytsenko's eleven-minute monologue—that made the show resemble party advertising more than genuine debate, ultimately damaging the talk show’s reputation on ICTV.

Since 2020, Karpyak he has served as a jury member for the BBC Book of the Year Award, as well as a member of the supervisory board of the Come Back Alive charity organisation and the Ukrainian Institute. In 2021, he joined PEN Ukraine. Since the start of the Russian invasion of Ukraine in 2022, he has also been hosting ICTV's United News telethon. Since 27 July 2026, he has been Chair of the Supervisory Board of the Come Back Alive charity organisation.

Karpiak experienced the outbreak of Russia’s full-scale invasion on February 24, 2022, firsthand. Living near Hostomel Airport, he heard explosions early in the morning. Together with his wife, he quickly gathered their belongings and woke their children. While his wife and children evacuated, Karpiak returned to work, where he began residing, inside the television station, due to the war. At the time, his home in Bucha remained under threat, and the city soon came under Russian occupation. Originally from Kherson, Karpiak had planned to travel there on February 25, but by that day, it was no longer possible to leave the city. His family managed to evacuate from the occupied territory only on March 11, using a humanitarian corridor.

In 2023, Karpyak interviewed Dmytro Kuleba and joined the committee for the Shevchenko National Prize. Despite some improvements in 2024, many of Karpyak's interviews still resembled government briefings rather than dynamic conversations. Minister of Health Viktor Liashko spoke about reforms, former Prosecutor General Andriy Kostin listed cases, and Verkhovna Rada Chairman Ruslan Stefanchuk addressed issues in a detached manner. When asked about President Volodymyr Zelenskyy's failure to sign certain bills, Stefanchuk merely replied, "Well, let's think about it," after which Karpyak quickly moved on.

== Political positions ==
=== Statement against Knyagnitsky ===
The Ukrainian Media Movement demanded in 2023 that Harry Knyagnitsky, a former Russian state-sponsored journalist, be fired from the Voice of America (VOA) for his role in disseminating propaganda and false information. Knyagnitsky earlier defended Russia's annexation of Crimea and demonised the Ukrainian military, among other activities. In order to preserve the integrity of its journalism mission, the Media Movement urged that VOA look into how he was hired and fire him. Karpyak was among a number of well-known Ukrainian media figures that signed the statement.

=== Russian disinformation in Western media ===
Karpyak attacked Western media, especially when Ukraine banned Russian media, for being utilised by Russia to disseminate propaganda. He pointed out that Russia now spreads misleading stories, including claims of mishandled military aid and the Nord Stream pipelines sabotage, through publications like the Financial Times and The New York Times.

Karpyak underlined that although Western media is reliable, it can be swayed by funding or ideological alignment, noting that reporters with connections to Russia may provide biased reporting. The Ukrainian Ministry of Foreign Affairs, which he feels is frequently swayed by Russian interests, has also called for an editorial inquiry into disinformation in magazines such as the Financial Times.

== Personal life ==
Karpyak is married to Tetiana Pushnova, who also works in the media. Together, they have a daughter and two sons. He lives in Bucha, near Kyiv.

During Russia's invasion of Ukraine, Karpyak faced personal challenges, including the evacuation of his father-in-law from Bucha after a projectile hit his house. On the first day of the full-scale war, he continued his work while trying to stay in contact with his father-in-law, who was trapped in Bucha. Finally, on 11 March 2022, he was able to evacuate to Kyiv. Karpyak later visited the damaged house, where a shell had struck the second floor, causing considerable destruction. Fortunately, the blast did not ignite a fire, as it landed on laminate flooring rather than on wooden furniture.

== Honours ==
- Order of Merit Third Class (6 June 2022)
