= Savik Shuster =

Ukraine-based journalist (born 1952)

- Савік Шустер
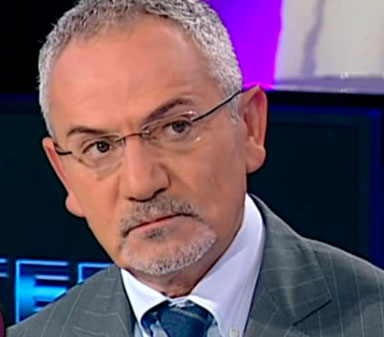
- Shuster in 2013
- Born: Ševelis Šusteris (Latvian); Шевелис Шустерис (Russian); November 22, 1952 (age 73); Vilnius, Lithuanian SSR, Soviet Union
- Occupation: Journalist

Savik Shuster (Russian: Савик Шустер; Ukrainian: Савік Шустер; born Ševelis Šusteris; November 22, 1952) is a journalist and television anchor. He presented The Freedom By Savik Shuster, and starting in 2005, The Freedom of Speech (ICTV), on ICTV. Since December 2015, he produces and leads political talk shows on his independent 3S.tv, after he has been cancelled from several tycoon-owned channels. In December 2016, 3S.tv announced it had ceased its activities, and on 1 March 2017, the channel stopped broadcasting. According to an official statement, the reason was that the business was no longer viable due to several litigations and corresponding financial constraints. All court cases were subsequently closed. In 2019, Shuster came back to Ukraine as the anchor of Svoboda slova Savika Shustera on the Ukraine TV channel.

From 2001 to 2004, Shuster presented talk shows on the Russian channel NTV.

Shuster holds Canadian and Italian citizenships.

== Biography ==
Born in Vilnius (then former part of the Soviet Union now the capital of Lithuania) to a Jewish family, Shuster left the Soviet Union 1971, his parents (his father was a football coach) emigrated from their native Vilnius via Israel to Canada. A distant uncle, who was vice president of the oil company Shell Canada, intervened with Soviet Prime Minister Alexei Kosygin on their behalf. In 1973 Shuster began a Bachelors at McGill University in Montreal, graduating in 1976 with a medical degree. He then moved to Florence in Italy to continue his studies. There, he began writing for a local newspaper. In 1980 Shuster worked for three months with a French humanitarian organization that was working on the side of the anti-Soviet mujahedin in Afghanistan, there he met Newsweek magazine's Asia editor and was offered a chance to write a few articles for them. Shortly after Shuster started to write for French newspaper Libération and the Italian magazine Frigidaire.

Addition: Savik Shuster studied at the Moscow Institute of Petrochemical and Gas Industry since 1972. group NHS-72-4 He stopped his studies in 1973, and emigrated to Canada with his parents after.

=== Career in Russia ===
From 1988 (when he did not speak Russian often) to 2001, Shuster worked for Radio Free Europe/Radio Liberty. From 1996 to 2001 he was the head of their Moscow office. In 1998 he began presenting a football show on NTV. Radio Liberty fired him over a perceived conflict of interest during Gazprom's takeover of NTV from Vladimir Gusinsky's Media-MOST in April 2001. Radio Liberty said that, by continuing with his (Football) program at NTV, Shuster had violated its professional code and policy over conflicts of interests. Weeks after Gazprom's takeover, Shuster began anchoring NTV's "Hero of the Day" interview show and then "Svoboda Slova" (Freedom of Speech). Until 2004, he was the host of several talkshows on the NTV channel. Allegedly Shuster's and his employer NTV's coverage of the Moscow hostage crisis infuriated (then) President Vladimir Putin in 2002. In 2004 his show "Freedom of Speech" was awarded a "TEFI" by the Russian Academy of Television. Shuster's last Russian show was cancelled by NTV because "the audience was too old". According to Shuster, this was not the real reason the station closed his talkshow: "the truth was the Kremlin could no longer afford an open, live show". According to Shuster, in the Soviet era "in Kiev it was a dream to get to Moscow, but now Putin's politics is killing a lot of creativity, and Moscow is becoming less attractive for Ukrainians".

=== Career in Ukraine ===
Since 2005 Shuster has been working in Ukraine. According to Shuster, at first he had no plans to work in Ukraine but changed his mind shortly after a 2005 visit to a friend, Russian politician Boris Nemtsov, in Kyiv a few months after Ukrainians "Orange Revolution" (Nemtsov was an adviser to Ukrainian President Viktor Yushchenko at the time). "I decided to go and make some fun of him, I planned to say to him, 'Boris, you finally found a place in politics, but it is in the wrong country.' But when I came into his office, I saw he was in a very good mood, and I said, 'Boris, maybe I, too, should go to Ukraine.'" A few months later, he lived in the Ukrainian capital, studied Ukrainian and worked in Ukraine as a broadcaster.

From May 2005 Savik hosted The Freedom of Speech on ICTV. In mid-2007, Shuster left ICTV for INTER, where he hosted "Freedom by Savik Shuster." However, this move caused a copyright infringement battle between ICTV and INTER, over the alleged theft of the format of The Freedom of Speech.

Following the announcement of the copyright lawsuit, one Ukrainian journalist wrote:

"What is the difference between "Freedom" on INTER and "Freedom of Speech" on ICTV? - The ICTV studio has air conditioning."

In August 2008 the production-studio "Savik Shuster Studios" was created, and in 2008 TV-channel "Ukraina" made a three-year contract with this studio for broadcasting the social-political talk show "Shuster Live". In July 2009 Shuster broke ties with the production company, which was renamed to Istil Studios. According to Shuster, in 2008, "When our program is on the air, it is watched on every third TV set in the country". "Ukraina" saw a sudden boost in popularity ratings after the start of Shuster's political talk show in September 2008.

In September 2009 Shuster claimed "unknown people" tried to sabotage the airing of his program "Shuster Live".

May 21, 2010 deputy head of the Administration of Ukraine Hanna Herman stated the wish that Ukraine's most popular political talks shows would be anchored only by Ukrainian journalists, "We are still victims to that imperial complex that 'everything coming from Moscow is good, everything Ukrainian is bad'".

In January 2011 all Shuster programs moved to Pershyi Natsionalnyi. Meanwhile, the number of viewers of his show had dropped from 1 million in 2006 to 600,000 people in 2011.

Since February 2013 "Shuster Live" was again aired on Inter TV. But it moved back to Pershyi Natsionalnyi in March 2014 and was aired on that channel till 2015. It moved to 1+1. But that channel cancelled the show and starting in December 2015 the show was aired on Shuster's own independent 3S.tv. In December 2016 3S.tv went bankrupt and on 1 March 2017 the channel stopped broadcasting.

Shuster was for 2 1/2 years absent from TV, until in September 2020 returned with the comeback episode of his talk show, "Freedom of Speech", on Ukraina TV. The episode of "Freedom of Speech" of 25 February 2022 was not broadcast due to the 2022 Russian invasion of Ukraine. Since then, the program has no longer been aired.

==== Language of presenting ====
Shuster presents his (Ukrainian) programs in Russian. According to him, he "was allowed to do it because he was not ethnic Russian and everyone understood the language. But at first, on Ukrainian TV, Russian-speaking TV host was a phenomenon. Now the issue of the language is not a burning issue, there were other problems".

== Political views ==
Shuster considered himself to be a liberal. In a 2008 interview with Novaya Gazeta Shuster said he would be interested in hosting debates between presidential contenders in Russia.

"However, I'm afraid I wouldn't be invited as they need exactly those who play up, and that's a kind of censorship. This allowed Putin to refuse participation in the debates at all. Here [in Ukraine] such a thing is just impossible. Those who refuse taking part in debates, they lose at once. When I had the live air on NTV, United Russia tried to boycott it realizing their public competitiveness is not high and actually they don't have many arguments. Then, though, they began to visit it again, as they had to. And now, with the absence of the live air, they all became 'masters'".

The Jamestown Foundation considers Shuster "a Yulia Tymoshenko sympathizer". In a 2009 interview with the Financial Times Shuster does not believe a revival of Russian democracy will happen: "If there is a political transformation in Russia, it will not be towards democracy. They have lost the foundation for a democratic transformation. They have decided to build power by looking for supporters among the intolerant. I think a fascist dictatorship is more likely than Nemtsov or Kasparov or Kasyanov coming to power".

== Family ==
Shuster is currently married to Olga Nevskaya (second wife). His first wife was Italian. She and his family continued to live in Florence (Italy) during his career in Russia and Ukraine.

Preceded by Oleksandr Shovkovskyi	Most beautiful by VIVA! 2007; With: Tina Karol	Succeeded by Volodymyr Zelenskyy
