= The Freedom of Speech (ICTV) =

Ukrainian news debate show

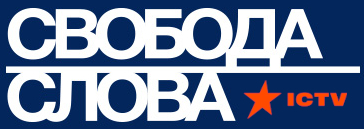
- Airs Monday evenings at 10:20 p.m
- Also known as: Svoboda Slova
- Свобода слова
- Presented by: Savik Shuster; Andriy Kulykov; Vadym Karpyak
- Country of origin: Ukraine
- Original language: Ukrainian

Production
- Production company: Starlight Media

Original release
- Network: ICTV
- Release: 29 September 2005 – present

The Freedom of Speech is one of the first socio-political talk shows in Ukrainian television history, providing a platform for open public discourse. It has become a central venue for political debate and civic engagement, regularly featuring politicians, experts, journalists, and members of the public in discussions on current national and international issues. The program has earned a reputation as a key source of political commentary and analysis, and it is widely recognized as one of the most frequently cited television broadcasts in Ukraine. Its live format encourages spontaneous and often vigorous exchanges, reflecting a broad spectrum of viewpoints. The current presenter of the program is Vadym Karpyak. After the full-scale Russian invasion of Ukraine in 2022, the show "took a little rest," but went back on the air within the year.

== History ==
When Savik Shuster left the show in 2007 for his new show on INTER, called Freedom with Savik Shuster, ICTV and INTER became embroiled in a bitter copyright infringement case that played out in the Ukrainian media landscape. One journalist, when writing about the format of the new show, wrote:

"What is the difference between "Freedom" on "Inter" and "Freedom of Speech" on ICTV? – The ICTV studio has air conditioning."

== Format ==
The format of the show includes six local experts in social sciences or journalism seated in groups of three, four special guests seated in pairs, and two additional unannounced guests who speak during the broadcast. A large video screen displays key discussion topics, such as: “Can Russia’s information war become a Third World War?” The show runs late at night and typically lasts between two and four hours. It has a wide viewership in Ukraine, where political talk shows are popular.

== Voting technology and streaming ==
Since 2010, ICTV has partnered with technology firm COSMONOVA to enhance its studio infrastructure. This collaboration replaced the show's analog audience voting system with a digital platform. The new system enables real-time interaction between the studio audience, guest experts, and editors. Using networked tablets, participants can vote on discussion topics, pose questions directly to the editorial team, and be grouped according to opinion or demographic. The platform also includes expert filters, allowing editors to quickly identify specialists by field—such as economics or public policy—for inclusion in specific episodes.

Prior to this upgrade, the program relied on various disconnected tools and manual coordination, which was time-consuming and resource-intensive. The new solution integrates cloud-based infrastructure, in-studio monitoring, video streaming tools, and dynamic titling features. Notably, live audience reactions are visualized in real time on studio screens, and key quotes are clipped automatically for online distribution.

== Awards ==
- 2018 — Teletriumph, Best Talk Show
- 2013 — Teletriumph, Best Political Talk Show
- 2012 — Teletriumph, Best Political Talk Show
- 2011 — Teletriumph, Best Socio-political Program
- 2009 — Teletriumph, Best Talk Show
- 2007 — Teletriumph, Best Socio-political Program
- 2006 — Teletriumph, Best Talk Show
