= Translator-referent =

Job title involving translation and interpretation

A translator-referent or a referent-translator (Note: (Ukrainian: референт-перекладач or перекладач-референт), (Romanian: Referent-traducător), (Russian: референт-переводчик), (Belarusian: рэферэнт-перакладчык), (Kazakh: референт-аудармашы), (Kyrgyz: референт-котормочу), (Tajik: референт-таҳлилгар), (Uzbek: referent-tarjimon)) (terminology used almost exclusively in the former Soviet Union) is a multilingual business or government professional who combines linguistic expertise with administrative and organizational responsibilities, particularly in contexts involving international communication. The role is most commonly found in post-Soviet states, where the title continues to be used in both public institutions and the private sector. A translator-referent is a specialist who not only performs written or oral translations, but also prepares reports and presentations for management, communicates with foreign partners, coordinates meetings and business events, organizes conferences (including sending invitations, booking venues, and negotiating details), handles business correspondence and translates official documentation. This profession requires not only language proficiency but also organizational skills and an understanding of the specific industry in which the professional works. This profession demands multi-functionality and subject-specific expertise. Translator-referents are often required to perform outside the bounds of conventional translation, necessitating proficiency not only in languages but also in diplomacy, event planning, and specialized knowledge domains. Since the term is not used outside of the former Soviet Union, there is no direct equivalent job title in the English-speaking world.

In the Soviet Union, a "Referent" (Russian: Референт) was a specific position in the system of state civil service belonging to the highest category of specialists; civil servants were assigned a class rank: "Referent of the State." The term is still used in many post-Soviet states, including Russia, Germany, and Ukraine.

== Overview ==
The translator-referent performs a dual function:

1. Linguistic tasks – including the translation of official documents, correspondence, and presentation materials.
2. Administrative and organizational duties – such as preparing reports, managing communications with foreign partners, coordinating international events and negotiations, sending invitations, arranging accommodations, and facilitating both online and in-person meetings.

In large-scale international conferences or business gatherings, the translator-referent often serves as the primary point of contact for foreign guests and delegates. The role may also include real-time interpretation and the handling of multilingual logistics to ensure that all participants can engage effectively, regardless of their native language.

The translator-referent plays a key role in facilitating cross-cultural communication within multinational enterprises, diplomatic settings, and international event coordination. By managing both the language and logistical aspects of international interaction, this professional helps bridge gaps between institution and ensures the smooth execution of complex operations.

In contemporary professional environments, the role of the translator-referent has expanded beyond traditional translation work. The modern translator-referent is expected to be highly adaptable and capable of performing a wide range of tasks, including those typically associated with project managers or event coordinators. They must also possess specialized knowledge in the field relevant to their organization. For instance, a translator-referent supporting a medical conference may be required to understand and accurately translate technical terminology related to oncology or other areas of healthcare.

Qualifications for a translator-referent include the ability to demonstrate fluency in at least one foreign language, along with an excellent command of their native language. They must possess strong communication skills, organizational abilities, and a high level of business acumen. Other essential qualities include stress tolerance, discretion (similar to translators and interpreters, the information involved is often classified), sociability, and the ability to handle multiple tasks. Knowledge of specialized terminology in fields such as medicine, law, information technology, or economics may also be necessary, depending on the employer's sector. Educational pathways to this profession typically include university degrees in linguistics, philology, or translation studies. Additional training often comes from specialized courses focusing on business communication, corporate etiquette, and administrative functions.

Translator-referents are employed in a wide range of sectors, including international corporations, diplomatic missions, media companies, government institutions, and educational organizations. They may also work with export-oriented businesses and transport firms such as airports. Some professionals are hired on a contract basis to support one-time business events or trips.

== See also ==
- Liaison officer
- Diplomat
- Executive assistant
- Protocol officer
- Language localisation
