= Hromadske =

Ukrainian digital media outlet

hromadske
- Native name: Громадське
- Headquarters: Kyiv, Ukraine
- Website: hromadske.ua
- Launched: 22 November 2013 as Hromadske.TV

Hromadske (Ukrainian: Громадське, lit. 'Public'; stylized in lowercase as hromadske) is an independent online media in Ukraine. The station was announced in June 2013 by 15 journalists, before commencing operations on 22 November 2013. It is registered as an NGO.

== History ==
The idea originated from journalist Roman Skrypin in September 2012. After the April 2013 ownership dispute at TVi 31 journalists resigned from TVi on 29 April 2013, they believed as TVi employees they could not anymore "guarantee our audience to provide objective and unbiased information". They then announced on 30 April 2013 to set up a "web project in which we will do the same job". Some of the former TVi journalists joined Hromadske.TV, including the well known (in Ukraine) Mustafa Nayem. The project also included Nataliya Gumenyuk, and was also joined by journalist Yuliia Bankova, because she "in 2010, working at Pershyi Natsionalnyi for the first time [got] confronted with censorship". The project was officially announced in June 2013 by 15 journalists. A Russian counterpart Public TV Russia lasted only three months due to exhausted financial resources.

The channel was planned to start to operate in September 2013. But its first broadcast was on 22 November 2013, at 14:00. It was originally scheduled to start at 18:00; but this time was moved forward a few hours in response to the 21 November 2013 Ukrainian government decree suspended preparations for signing of an EU-Ukraine Association Agreement. During the (following) Euromaidan-protests the channel saw its numbers of viewers heavily increasing. These Euromaidan protests were caused by the same reason (the 21 November 2013 Ukrainian government decree) as to why the channel started to broadcast earlier (on 22 November 2013). On 29 November 2013, during Euromaidan, journalists of 5 Kanal and Hromadske.TV were attacked by "athletically built men in plainclothes believed to be hired thugs" in Kyiv's Mariinskyi park, while "police were nowhere in sight". The attacks occurred during filming. The Hromadske.TV journalists' camera was smashed and the memory card with their footage taken.

In July 2014, an anchor for Hromadske TV cut off an interview with Tanya Lokshina, a researcher in the Russia office of Human Rights Watch, after she had insisted on speaking about civilian casualties but refused to blame Russia outright for the conflict (as HRW never comment on matters of political responsibility), despite repeated demands from the anchor, Danylo Yanevsky.

In 2014 Hromadske.TV launched Hromadske International to highlight Ukrainian news for English-speaking audiences. Articles were originally published on a Medium blog, but in 2015, Hromadske International was given its own website.

On 19 January 2016, Hromadske journalists accused Skrypin of appropriating funds from the NGO. The Supervisory Board published a list of requirements for Skrypin which included transferring the rights to the hromadske.tv domain, returning the funds he took and disclosing how he used them. In April 2016 criminal proceeding were opened against him.

In July 2016 The World Intellectual Property Organization Arbitration and Mediation Center denied the complaint and left the domain ‘hromadske.tv’ to Skrypin.

== Funding ==
The station is publicly and privately funded and has a bank account (Privat Bank) posted on its website. Individual contributions in 2013 amounted to over 1.1 million Ukrainian hryvnias, -₴- and over 1.4 million in the first quarter of 2014.

According to the interim financial report Hromadske TV was funded in 2013 by the Netherlands Embassy (793,089 Ukrainian hryvnias, -₴-), the US Embassy (399,650 ₴) and by George Soros' International Renaissance Foundation (247,860). By June 2014 Hromadske TV had received another 558,842₴ from the Government of Canada, 394,181₴ from the Fritt Ord Foundation, 287,898₴ from the Embassy of the United States, Kyiv, 207,402₴ from an auction organized by 'Dukat' (the Auction House) and 1,875,180₴ from individual contributors.

== Management ==
CEOs

- Roman Skrypin (2013-2016)
- Kateryna Horchynska (2016-2018)
- Maryna Holota (2019-2020)
- Yuliia Bankova (2020-2021)
- Yuliia Fediv (2021-2022)
- Alyona Nevmerzhytska (2022-2026)
- Oksana Sohor (since 2026)

Chief editors

- Anhelina Kariakina (2016-2020)
- Nataliia Huzenko (2020)
- Nastia Stanko (2020-2021)
- Yevheniia Motorevska (2021-2023)
- Khrystyna Kotsira (since 2023)
