= Tetiana Pushnova =

Ukrainian reporter, editor and producer (born 1978)

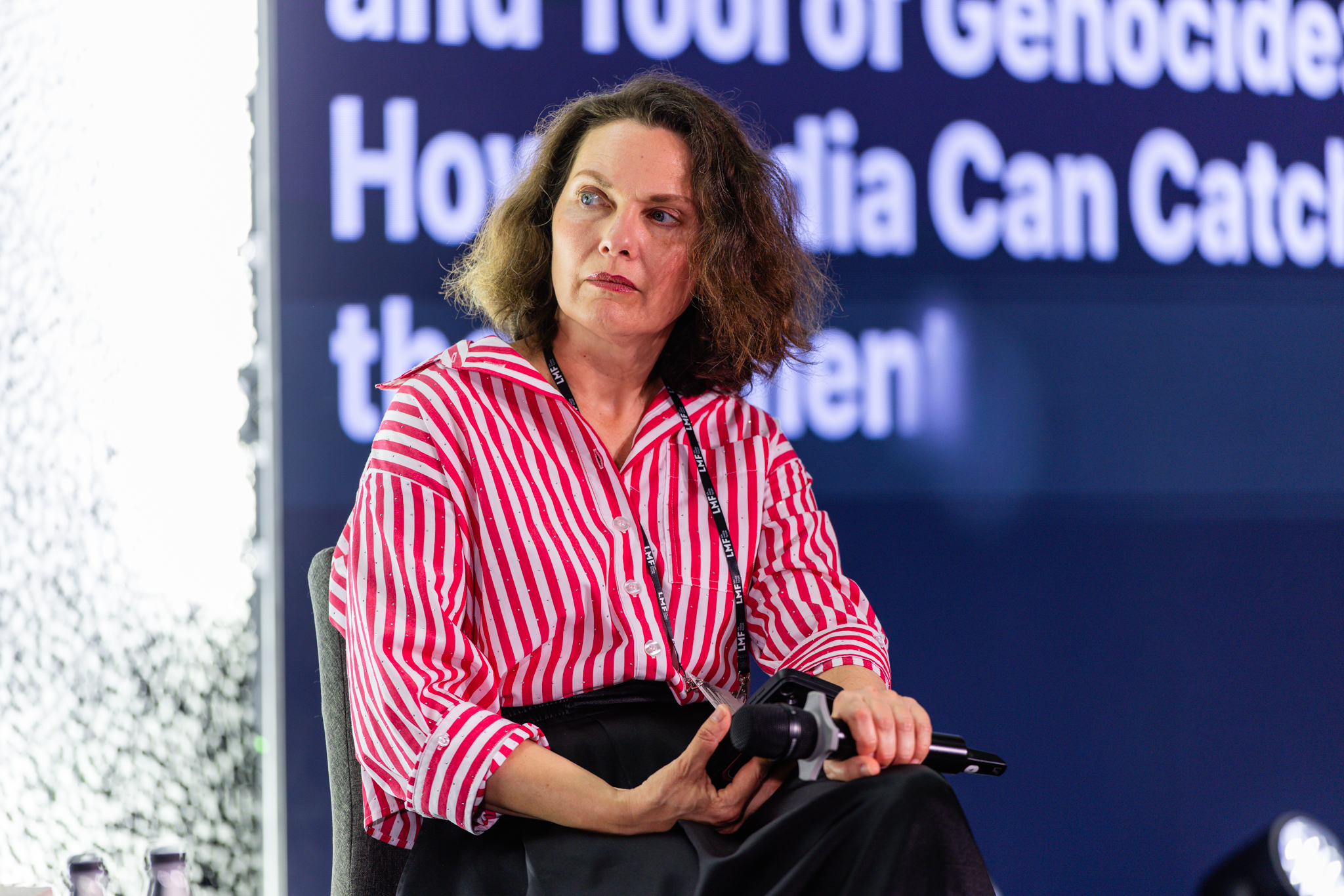
- Tetiana Pushnova in 2026
- Born: Ukrainian: Тетяна Пушнова; March 12, 1978 (age 48); Kherson

Tatiana Pushnova (born March 12, 1978) is a Ukrainian reporter, editor and producer. She is chief editor of "Television News Service" and General Producer of Ukraine Today since August 2014.

== Biography ==
Pushnova was born March 12, 1978, in the city of Kherson. She graduated from the National University of "Kyiv-Mohyla Academy".

She started working at 5 Kanal as a reporter covering in particular the military conflict in Georgia in August 2008. She was involved in the creation of and released the news on TVi. Since 2010 she has been working at the Ukrainian channel 1+1. During this time she created the first Ukrainian TV tabloid TSN.Osoblyve and from September 2011 she has headed the powerful version of "Television News Service" on Channel 1+1.

Since August 24, 2014, she is the general producer of Ukraine Today
