= Lukyanets =

Lukyanets (Ukrainian: Лук'янець), also spelled Loukianetz, is a surname. Notable people with the surname include:

- Pavlo Lukyanets, Ukrainian footballer
- Solomiya Lukyanets (born 2001), Ukrainian opera singer
- Victoria Loukianetz, Ukrainian operatic soprano
- Volodymyr Lukyanets
