= Herasymyuk =

Herasymyuk (Ukrainian: Герасимюк, also transliterated as Herasymiuk) is a surname of Ukrainian origin. Notable people with the surname include:

- Oleh Herasymyuk (born 1986), Ukrainian footballer
- Olha Herasymyuk (born 1958), Ukrainian journalist and TV presenter

== See also ==
- Joe Harasymiak (born 1986), American football coach
