= Mykola Bagrayev =

Ukrainian businessman (born 1964)

- Багъӕраты Никъала
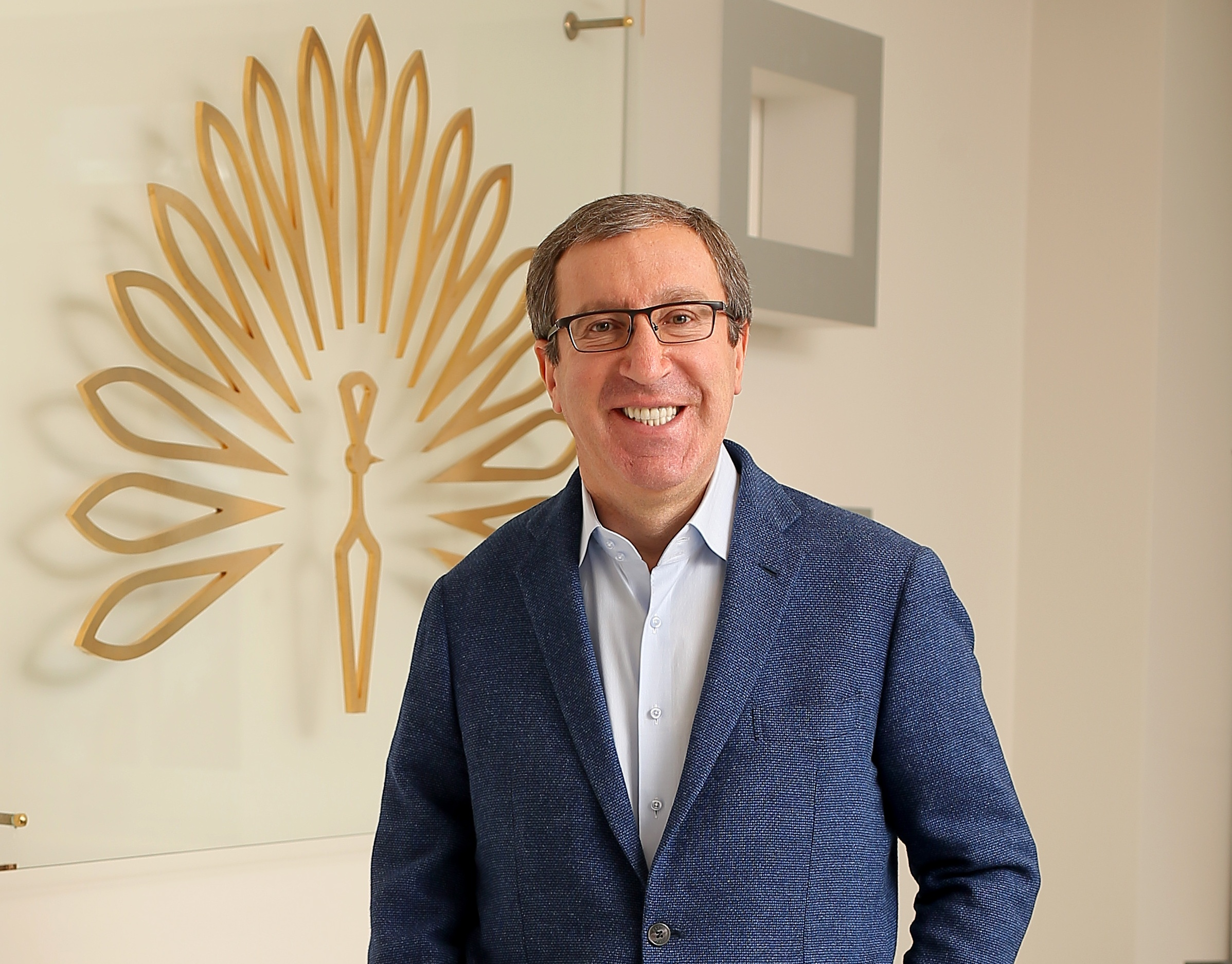

People's Deputy of Ukraine
- In office 2002–2014
- Constituency: 4th, 5th, 6th and 7th convocations

Honorary Consul of the Republic of Korea
- In office 2018–?

Personal details
- Born: 19 June 1964 (age 62) Digora, North Ossetian ASSR, Russian SFSR, Soviet Union
- Known for: Ukrainian businessman in media and show business, social activist
- Awards: Honored Artist of Ukraine (1997); Order Of Merit, Third Class (2004); Honorary citizen of Kakhovka; Order Of Merit, Second Class (2020)

Mykola Georgiyovich Bagrayev (Ukrainian: Микола Георгійович Баграєв; Iron Ossetic: Багъӕраты Георгийы фырт Никъала; born 19 June 1964) is a Ukrainian businessman in the fields of media and show business and a social activist. He is best known as the founder of the Tavria Games, an international music festival, and the Chernomorki Games, a national charitable festival for children. He established the radio broadcasting group TAVR Media, and also played a key role in the creation of the Ukrainian music television channels M1 and M2. Bagrayev is a co-founder of TicketsBox, a ticket distribution platform, and has ownership interests in the advertising company RTM-Ukraine and the technical production firm Profi Group. Between 2000 and 2002, he served on the National Council of Television and Radio Broadcasting of Ukraine. During this time, the Council created the Teletriumph Awards, Ukraine's only national television awards, of which Bagarev is a co-founder. He was elected as a member of the Verkhovna Rada (Ukrainian Parliament) for four consecutive terms, from 2002 to 2014, and was active on the Committee on Freedom of Speech and Information Policy.

In response to the full-scale Russian invasion of Ukraine, Mykola Bagrayev’s media enterprises discontinued the use of Russian content early on—well before the enactment of Ukraine’s Law No. 2310-IX on June 19, 2022, which imposed restrictions on the public use of music from the aggressor state. On February 27, 2022, Russian Radio Ukraine was officially shut down. Shortly afterward, a new station, Radio Bayraktar was launched. Within just three months, Radio Bayrakta” emerged as one of Ukraine’s most popular FM broadcasters.

== Biography ==
Bagrayev was born on 19 June 1964, in the village of Digora in North-Ossetian ASSR, Russia. His mother is Chabahan Bagrayeva (born 1927), and his father is Georgiy Bagrayev (born 1882), a farmer in Digora and a war veteran.

Bagrayev is married to Svetlana Bagrayeva (born in 1966), a psychologist. They have a son, Ruslan (born in 1988), who graduated from Kyiv National Economic University with a degree from the International Economics and Management faculty. The pair also have a daughter, Lyudmila (born in 1990). She is also enrolled in the International Economics and Management faculty at Kyiv National Economic University.

In 1987 Bagrayev graduated from Kherson State Agrarian and Economic University, Faculty of Civil Engineering., in 2005 – from Kyiv National Economic University, Faculty of International Economics, cum laude.

His entry into the career field of "senior technical inspector" was in 1987, in the permanent buildings and facilities construction department of "Kherson Beauty." From 1988 to 1991, he served as Second Secretary, and later First Secretary of the Kakhovka City Komsomol Committee. In 1991, he was appointed Chairman of the Youth Committee of the Kakhovka Municipality, a position he held until 1992.

Since 1992, his professional career has been closely tied to the international festival Tavria Games. He served as CEO of the festival's directorate from 1992 to 1996, then as President of the joint-stock company Tavria Games from 1996 to 2000, and continued as President of Tavria Games. Since 2014, he has also held the position of Chairman of the Supervisory Board of Tavria Media, the festival’s affiliated radio division.

Bagrayev is a businessman in mass media and show business. Founder of the festivals "Tavria Games" (founded in 1992) and "Black Sea Games" (1998).

He founded the TAVR Media radio group, which manages 9 radio stations: Hit FM, Radio ROKS, KISS FM, Radio RELAX, Melody FM, Nashe Radio, Radio JAZZ, Classic Radio, Radio Bayraktar. He is also the founder of a group of companies representing music TV channels M1, M2.

== Politics and Social activity ==
- February 1998 – October 2000 – Secretary of Presidential Expert Council of Manufacturers and Entrepreneurs.
- June 2000 – May 2002 – Member of the National Presidential Council on Television and Radio Broadcasting of Ukraine.
- June 2002 – April 2006 – Secretary of Verkhovna Rada Committee on freedom of speech and information.
- June 2006 – June 2007 – Chairman of the Subcommittee on electronic media and ICT systems, Verkhovna Rada Committee on freedom of speech and information.
- Since December 2007 – Member of Verkhovna Rada Committee on freedom of speech and information.
- Since May 2006 – Member of the fraction of Yulia Tymoshenko Bloc.
- December 2007 – March 2010 – Advisor to the Prime Minister of Ukraine (as a public service).
- Member of the Committee of the Ministry of Culture and Tourism of Ukraine.
- Member of the Group for Interparliamentary Relations with Russia.

Mykola Bagrayev was the People's Deputy of Ukraine in the 4th, 5th, and 6th convocations of Verkhovna Rada. Although elected for the pro-European Bloc Yulia Tymoshenko (and at the time member of the All-Ukrainian Union "Fatherland") in March 2012, he became a member of the faction of the pro-Russian Party of Regions in March 2012, despite having been one of the architects of Yulia Tymoshenko's election campaign during the Ukrainian presidential elections of 2010.

In 2012 he was re-elected into parliament on the party list of the Party of Regions (number 51 on the list).

Bagrayev was among MPs from the ruling Party of Regions and the Communist Party who voted in favour of ten Ukrainian anti-protest laws restricting freedom of speech and freedom of assembly. This was described in the media and by experts as "draconian," with Timothy Snyder claiming that they effectively established the nation as a dictatorship.

Bagrayev did not stand in the 2014 Ukrainian parliamentary election.

== See also ==
- List of Ukrainian Parliament Members 2007
- Verkhovna Rada
