= Teletriumph Awards =

National Television awards of Ukraine

- Native name: Телетріумф
- Awarded for: Excellence in television
- Sponsored by: National Council of Television and Radio Broadcasting of Ukraine; Television Industry Committee (ITK); Ukrainian Television Academy
- Country: Ukraine
- Established: December 14, 2000; Created by Mykola Bagraev
- First award: April 25, 2001
- Website: www.teletriumph.ua

The Teletriumph Awards or Teletriumphs are the only national television awards of Ukraine, awarded by the National Council of Television and Radio Broadcasting of Ukraine, the Television Industry Committee (ITC), and the Ukrainian Television Academy. The awards adopted the name "Triumph," after the Ancient Roman Latin word meaning an outstanding success, or a celebration on the occasion of a victory. Every year since the creation of the awards, the total number of submissions for consideration, the total number of nominations, and the total number of awards has changed. The awards have been indefinitely postponed since 2022, and the last awards given were in 2018.

== History ==
=== Creating the awards ===
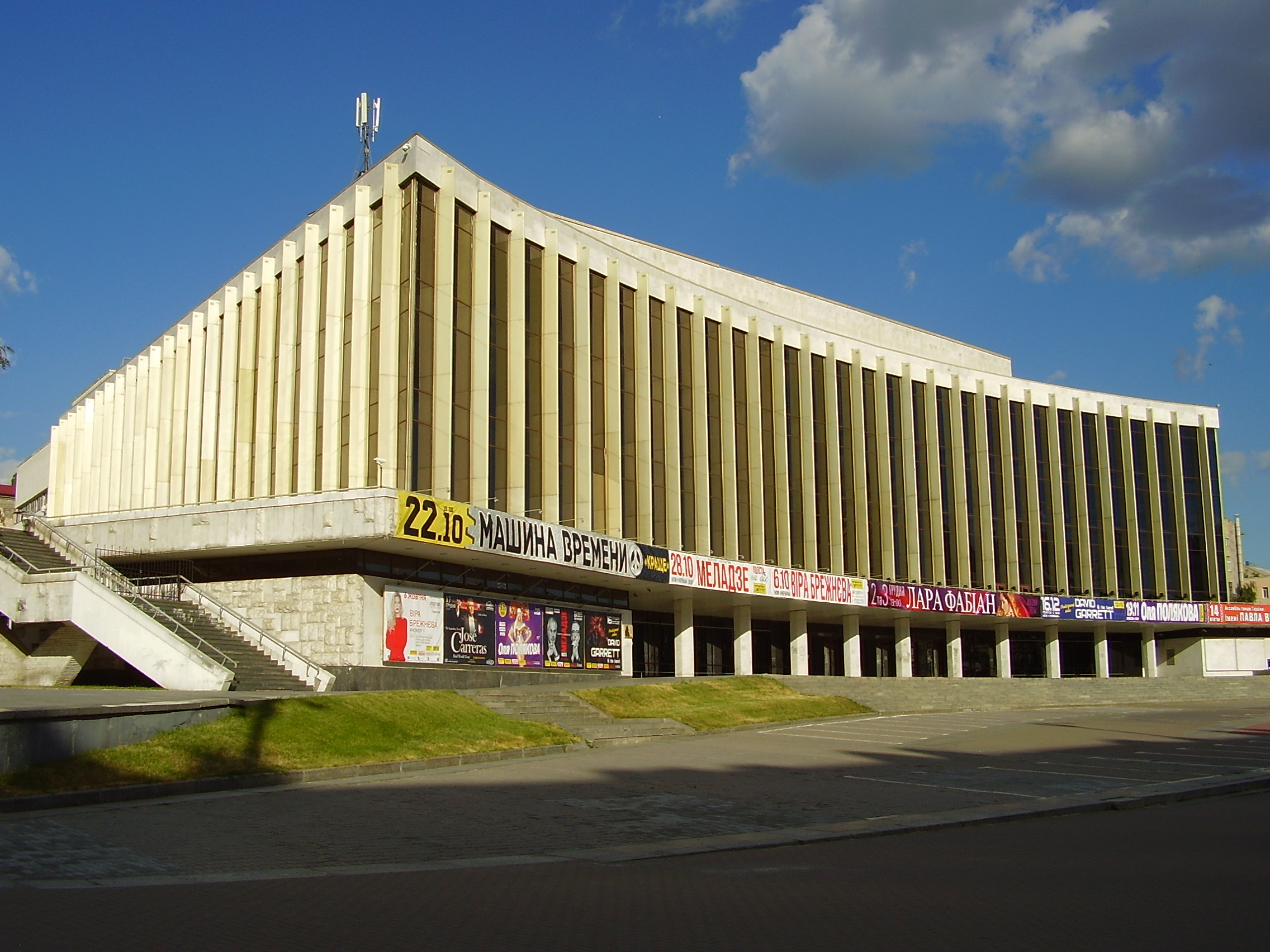
Palace Ukraine was the site of the first Teletriumph Awards on April 25, 2001

The National Television Award "Teletriumph" was established by the National Council of Ukraine on Television and Radio Broadcasting on December 14, 2000. The initiative for the award came from Mykola Bagraev, then a member of the National Council and founder of the Tavrian Games media group (TGM), which co-organized the award ceremonies in its initial years. The stated purpose in creating the awards was "in order to support the best creative teams [in television] at the state level."

The inaugural Teletriumph Awards were held on April 25, 2001, at the Ukraine Palace in Kyiv. That year, the award featured 14 categories, with 115 entries submitted by 51 television and radio companies. The winners were selected by a panel of 72 experts. The ceremony was hosted by television presenter Tetyana Tsymbal, who also hosted the second and third editions of the awards.

The host of the inaugural Teletriumph ceremony, as well as the subsequent two editions, was renowned Ukrainian journalist Tatiana Tsymbal. Beginning her career in 1969 at the State Committee for Television and Radio Broadcasting, Tsymbal served as both writer and presenter of numerous television programs across genres. She is widely regarded as one of the founders of the Ukrainian school of television presenting. Tsymbal holds the title of People's Artist of Ukraine and was a member of the Television Academy of Ukraine.

Teletriumph 2002 took place on March 22, 2002, at the President Hotel. Winners were selected across 21 categories by a professional jury. The number of applicants nearly doubled compared to the previous year, with notably increased participation from regional broadcasters. In total, 258 entries were submitted by 87 television organizations from across Ukraine.

In 2003, the Television Industry Committee (ITC) became a co-organizer of the awards. The number and structure of the award categories have varied from year to year. In 2004, Inter won the contract and broadcast the awards ceremony for the first time.

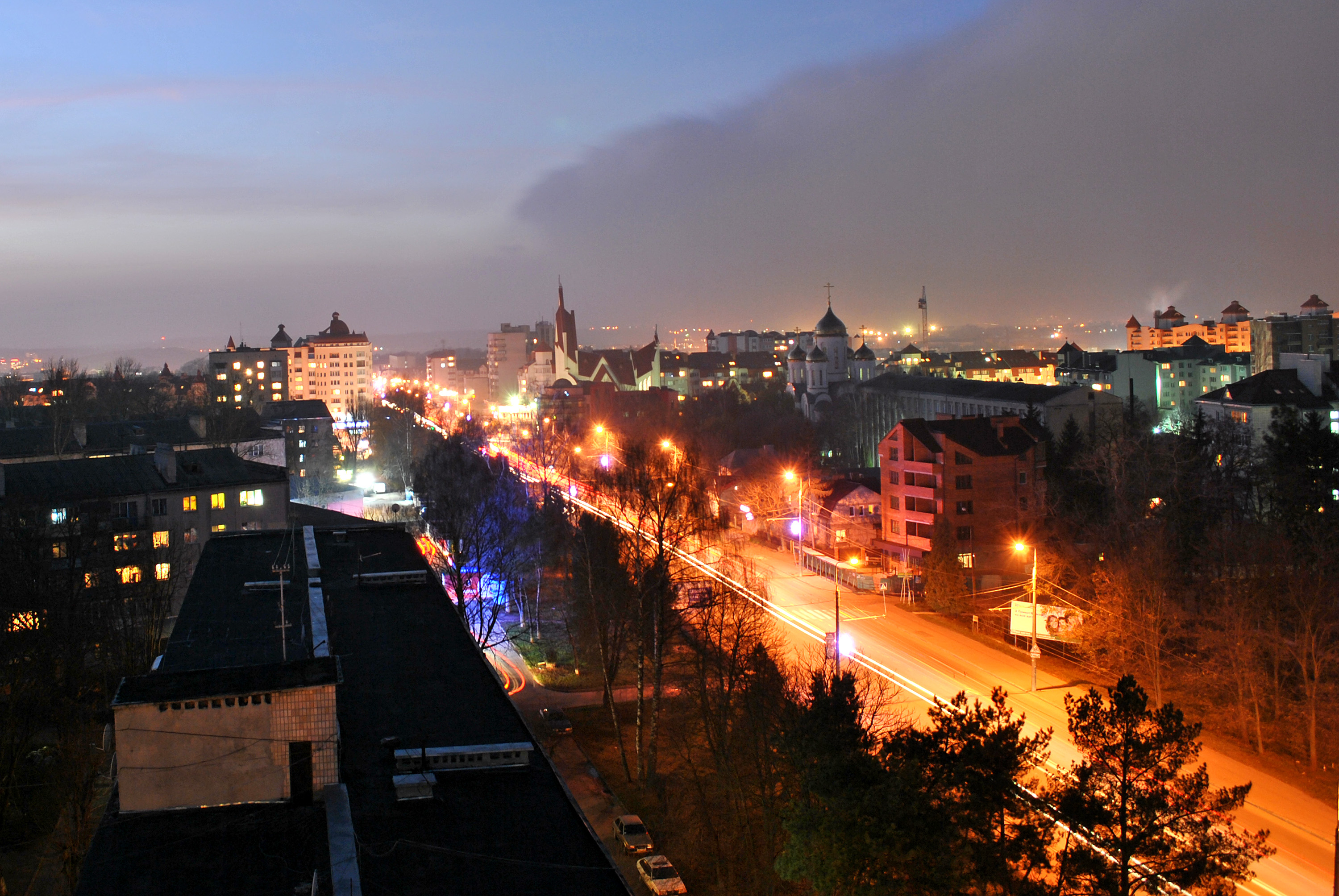
Teletriumph 2005 experimented with hosting the event outside of Kyiv, in the city of Zaporizhzhia. This was the only year that the ceremony was hosted outside of Kyiv.

The 2005 ceremony was notable for being the only edition held outside of Kyiv, taking place in Zaporizhzhia. In 2006, the format was reimagined as a musical and entertainment show, which was broadcast by 1+1.

=== Modernizing the awards ===
On May 31, 2007, the ITC announced that an independent international audit company would oversee the vote counting, following an open competition to select the firm. The company that won the contract was Ernst & Young. For the first time, a two-tier voting system was implemented, replacing the previous single-round method.

Teletriumph 2007 occurred on August 23, 2007, once again at the Ukraine Palace in Kyiv, with a recorded television version aired by the New Channel. That year also saw the introduction of the "Favorite of the Telepress" award – Ukraine's first ever journalist-voted television award – organized by Media Detector and Telecritic.

The concept for a Ukrainian Television Academy was discussed as early as 2006, with serious proposals to create the Academy occurring through 2007. It was strongly argued at the time that the awards in their present form fostered an environment that bred pay-to-play schemes and corporate favoritism in the submission and nomination processes, but the creation of a Television Academy would modernize the awards by transitioning them to a more professional regimen of criteria.

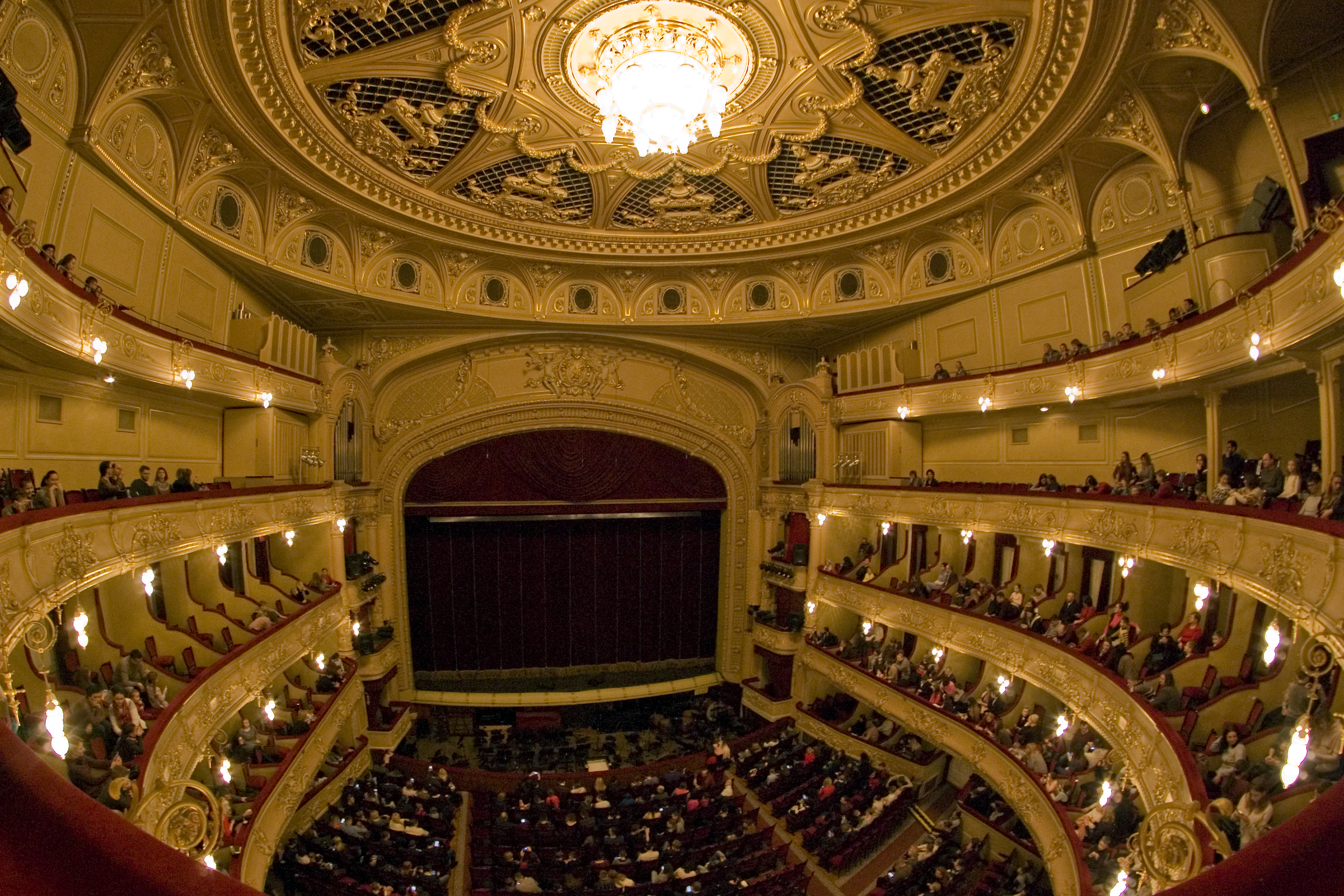
Teletriumph 2008 was the first Teletriumph hosted by the National Opera of Ukraine. Originally, the organizers had intended to host the awards in Kamianets-Podilskyi, but had to move it back to Kyiv due to massive floods across Ukraine.

=== Controversies, tensions, and natural disasters surrounding Teletriumph 2008 ===
Teletriumph 2008 was marred by a public conflict between the National Council of Television and Radio Broadcasting of Ukraine and the ITC. In June 2008, the National Council of Television and Radio Broadcasting of Ukraine opened the application process for that year's Teletriumph competition. The following day, the ITC objected to the use of the "Teletriumph" trademark by the National Council, asserting that it was under ITC's control. However, the award's organizing committee rejected this claim. It was later clarified that ITC did not own the trademark but managed it on behalf of its actual holders, the Tavria Games group of companies (TGM), owned by Mykola Bagraev.

Once the rights were officially transferred to the National Council, in response to what it perceived as the National Council's overly stringent regulatory policies, ITC withdrew from the project's organization. ITC also completely withdrew its sponsorship of the awards. This move led to the boycott of the competition by several major television channels. Among them were major stations affiliated with businessman Victor Pinchuk, including Novyi Kanal, STB, and ICTV, which all boycotted the 2008 awards. Observers attributed the dispute to broader tensions between major media players and the regulator, particularly concerning language policy and the council's nationalistic push for greater Ukrainian language content on television, and the move away from some Russian language content.

Originally, the conference organizers had intended to host the 2008 awards in the city of Kamianets-Podilskyi, but due to massive flooding around the whole Western part of Ukraine on August 21, with 862 towns inundated with deluge, the conference was moved to the National Opera of Ukraine in Kyiv.

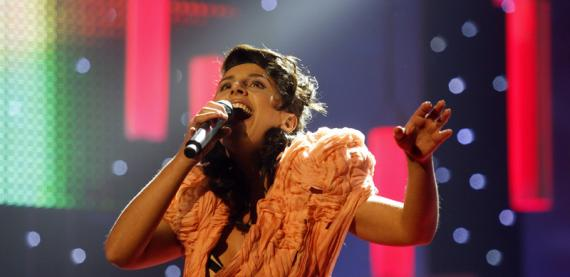
Jamala performing at Teletriumph 2010.

Despite these tensions, the awards ceremony was held on August 29, 2008. The event was broadcast live by Pershyi Natsionalnyi. During the awards, the opening ceremony included formal greetings from Vitaly Shevchenko, Chairman of the National Council on Television and Radio Broadcasting.

=== More reforms and changing political landscape ===
Teletriumph 2009 took place on September 4 at the October Palace in Kyiv. The television broadcast of the ceremony was produced by the channel 1+1. That year, a substantial number of awards were presented to channels affiliated with StarLightMedia, a media group owned by businessman Victor Pinchuk. The award for "Personal Contribution to the History of Television" was posthumously awarded to Ihor Pelykh, a prominent Ukrainian television presenter and producer. Additionally, the "Favorite of the Telepress" award, previously presented within the Teletriumph framework, was formally separated into an independent recognition.

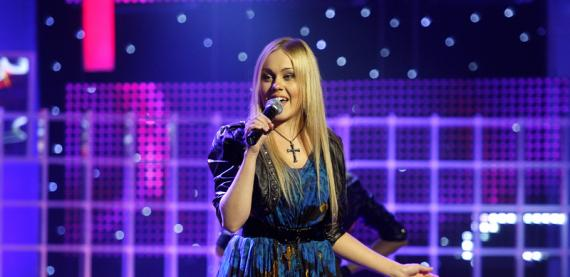
Alyosha performing at Teletriumph 2010.

Teletriumph 2010 was held at the National Opera of Ukraine and featured participation from major television channels and production companies. However, as in previous years, the awards drew attention from both within the broadcasting industry and from regulatory authorities, including members of the National Council of Television and Radio Broadcasting of Ukraine, who commented on the structure and outcomes of the competition.

One of the key issues identified in 2010 was the underrepresentation of regional broadcasters among the nominees and winners. National Council members, including Larysa Mudrak, Mykola Fartushny, and Yevhen Baranov, noted that local television stations faced systemic disadvantages in competing with well-resourced Kyiv-based and national broadcasters. They observed that Kyiv-based companies frequently dominated categories nominally intended for regional content, limiting the diversity of representation.

In response, council members proposed creating separate categories specifically for regional and capital-based broadcasters. This structural change was intended to make the competition more inclusive and reflective of the full range of television production across Ukraine. Without such changes, regional stations were seen as unlikely to gain meaningful recognition, regardless of the quality of their programming.

The 2010 awards also introduced several changes in format and organization. These included a reduced number of nominations and the implementation of electronic platforms for expert jury evaluations. While these updates were seen as steps toward improving transparency and efficiency, some technical issues were reported, including problems with an experimental electronic ticketing system and inconsistencies in how jury members accessed and evaluated content.

Concerns were also raised about the overall content recognized by the awards. Several Council members noted a lack of programming with high cultural or intellectual value among the winners, attributing this to broader market trends in Ukrainian broadcasting that favored ratings-driven content. This issue was seen as affecting both public and commercial broadcasters, contributing to a narrowing of the kinds of programs that received critical or institutional recognition.

=== Three channels dominate the industry, Opera dominates the 2011 awards ===
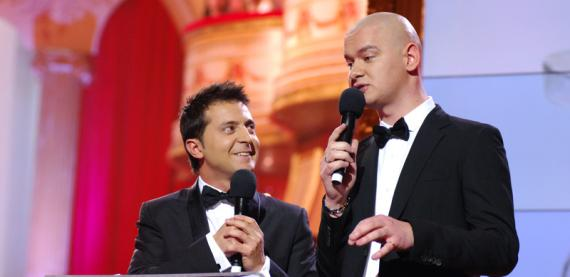
Volodymyr Zelenskyy (left) and Evgeny Koshovy (right) cohosting the opening portion of Teletriumph 2011, the national television awards of Ukraine. Kvartal 95 wrote the script and hosted the 2011 ceremony.

Teletriumph 2011, broadcast on INTER, was under a growing influence from Ukraine's three largest television holdings: Starlight Media, INTER, and 1+1. Not a single regional award went outside these conglomerates. This trend coincided with changes to the expert council and further consolidation of jury membership by major holding companies. Channels associated with Victor Pinchuk, the owner of some of the country's largest national channels, received the most awards. Meanwhile, the Ukraine media group and Channel 5 were again left without any awards.

Although the process was audited by Ernst & Young, concerns persisted that jury members were biased toward projects from their own media holdings. For instance, Novyi Kanal, which was owned by Starlight Media, did not receive internal support from their parent company even though they were struggling at the time. The Ukrainian press and the television community worried about the increasing predictability of outcomes and a possible monopolization of the awards process. That year's ceremony returned to the National Opera of Ukraine after two years at the October Palace.

Because the awards were hosted at the National Opera house, the studio that won the contract to host and write the awards, Kvartal 95, decided to focus the theme of the evening around opera itself. Each of the musical acts of the evening were pop-infused opera. The visual concept was inspired by the interior of the opera house, and the program featured musical interludes in keeping with this theme. Ukrainian pop artists performed their popular hits in operatic arrangements composed by Volodymyr Bebeshko, who also conducted a small orchestra.

Among the featured performers in 2011 were Iryna Bilyk, Harik Krychevsky, Victor Pavlik, and Ruslana. One of the standout moments came from Solomiya Lukyanets, a ten-year-old opera singer recognized at that time as Ukraine's youngest professional in the genre and a recipient of the Pride of the Country distinction. The ceremony was opened and closed by Italian tenor Alessandro Safina, another Pride of the Country honoree that year.

A notable highlight of the evening was a surprise musical performance by the Ukrainian Minister of Culture Mykhailo Kulynyak, who played the Moldovan folk tune "Moldovanyaska" on the violin. Kulyniak, a graduate of the Drohobych Music College and the Kyiv State Conservatory, demonstrated a range of unconventional playing techniques he had been trained in during his studies – he played the violin with his bow stuck between his knees, without looking at the violin while it was next to his ear, and in other positions.

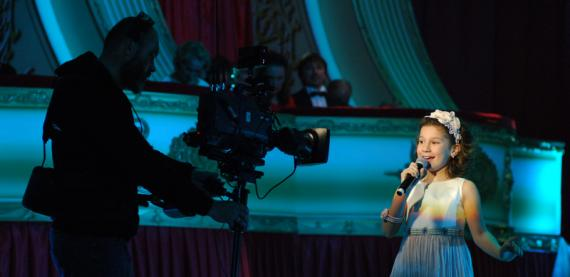
Solomia Lukyanets, then only 10 years old and the youngest professional opera singer in Ukraine, performs live at Teletriumph 2011.

The ceremony was structured into several thematic blocks: “Information Programs,” “Entertainment Programs,” “Regional Television,” “Cinema and TV Series,” and “Stars Behind the Scenes.” Nominees were invited to the stage either individually or in small groups, and awards were presented by the hosts from Studio Kvartal-95 as well as special guests. These included the Olympic champion Lilia Podkopaeva, ICTV CEO Oleksandr Bogutskyi, composer Konstantin Meladze, Ukraine TRC executive Marina Myrhorodska, Star Media board chairman Vlad Ryashin, and director Marius Weisberg.

Volodymyr Zelenskyy and Yevhen Koshovyi both participated in hosting the 2011 Teletriumf ceremony and also received an award for their program Evening Quarter, recognized as the best original entertainment program. During the presentation of this award, ICTV General Director Oleksandr Bogutskyi congratulated Zelenskyy and recalled a controversial comment from the public, in which someone claimed that the program should be banned for allegedly having a negative influence on children.

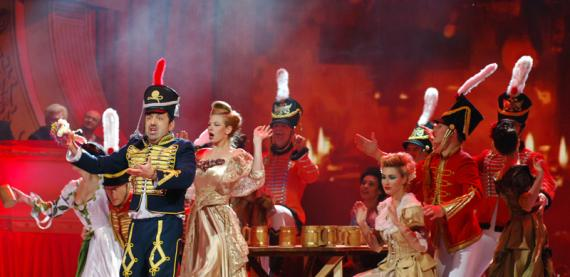
Performance of Kievlyanka (Kyiv Woman) by Gary Krichevsky at Teletriumph 2011, complemented with an orchestra conducted by Volodymyr Bebeshko.

Bogutskyi rejected the accusation, stating that he brought his own daughter, Justyna, as a gesture to counter claims that the show was harmful to children. He walked with her, hand-in-hand, onto the stage, and had her help him present awards to the most popular Ukrainian television personalities. "First, nothing should be banned on television, and second, television does not inherently corrupt," he said.

Zelenskyy responded in his acceptance speech by acknowledging the criticism that Evening Quarter had faced over the years, noting that the program was marking its tenth anniversary on air. He remarked that the team operated "from one broadcast to the next" and "from one article to the next," suggesting they had grown stronger through controversy. He humorously asked that the program not be shut down, explaining that the show's writers had families to support.

Compared to the previous year, the 2011 Teletriumf Awards introduced two major changes: a reduction in the total number of award categories and an expansion of the expert jury panel. These modifications were aimed at refining the selection process, though their effectiveness remained a subject of discussion. The organizers also decided to remove several technical and genre-specific categories. Professions such as lighting designers, sound engineers, composers, and art directors for television films or series were no longer included. This change drew criticism from industry figures, like Star Media General Producer Yuriy Minzyanov, who argued that these roles should still be recognized as creative contributions rather than excluded as merely technical work.

Additionally, the awards for television feature films, mini-series, documentary series, game shows, lifestyle programs, and historical programming were discontinued. The "Sports Commentator" category was also absent, possibly to avoid intra-network competition, especially among sports channels.

In contrast, new categories reflected emerging trends. A separate category was introduced for culinary programming, acknowledging the popularity of cooking shows. However, there was no individual category for reality television.

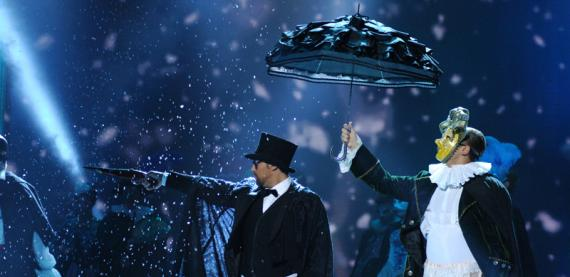
Iryna Bilyk performs You are Mine, written by Bilyk and arranged by Volodymyr Bebeshko at Teletriumph 2011.

The "Entertainment Program" category was split into two: one for original formats and another for adapted or licensed formats. In the area of television design, awards were divided between overall channel branding and individual program design. This last-minute addition surprised some participants. STB viewed the revised nomination list as a positive development. They noted that the organizers had taken feedback from various television channels into account and created a more balanced awards structure. In their opinion, the final list was optimal compared to the previous year, which had included 45 main categories and two special awards.

Another recurring criticism of Teletriumph involved the dominance of Kyiv-based nominees in the regional television categories. As in previous years, the CiTi TV, already familiar to Kyiv's television community, dominated these awards. According to the channel's director Serhii Dolbilov, this placed regional channels at a disadvantage. Producer Alla Lypovetska also criticized the results, saying, "Kyiv residents voted for their own. The jury should pay more attention to regional content." She singled out Lviv's ZIK channel as an example of overlooked excellence, remarking, "ZIK is a bomb. The problem is that the experts didn’t even watch what’s coming out of Lviv." The General Producer of the ZIK channel, Dmytro Dobrodomov, received no recognition at the 2011 Awards, despite expectations to the contrary.

Notably, the Kyiv-based City channel not only won in regional categories but also appeared in general national nominations—including those for culinary programming, Ukrainian-language dubbing, and television design. Director Serhiy Dolbilov defended this by stating, "Any channel, including regional ones, can participate in any category. What matters is the quality of the product." However, he acknowledged the imbalance, adding that perhaps City should consider stepping back from regional categories in the future to allow fairer competition.

=== Ernst and Young replaced by PwC, jury categories increased ===
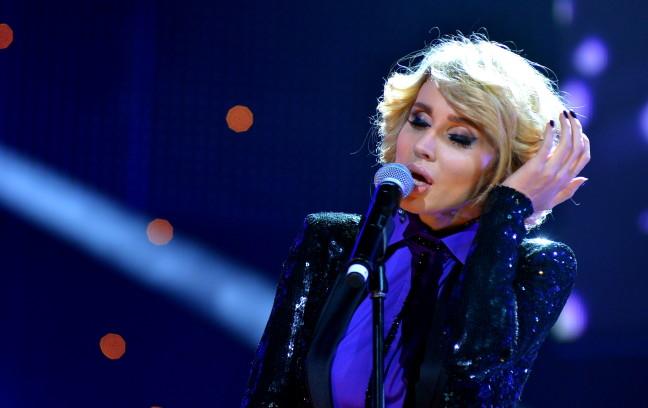
Svetlana Loboda performing 40 Gradusov, (40 Degrees) written by Loboda and Dima Monatik, at Teletriumph 2012.

In 2012, the organizing committee of the awards replaced Ernst & Young with PricewaterhouseCoopers (PwC) as the independent auditor of the awards. PwC was already known by then as the independent auditor of the Oscars. According to the press release at the time, PwC was brought in "to ensure the honesty and transparency of the main television award of Ukraine." (Note: Several years later, PwC would be directly responsible for the infamous 89th Academy Awards § Best Picture announcement error in which Warren Beatty announced the wrong winner for Best Picture.[1] The year after that, PwC was entirely banned from the National Bank of Ukraine after it was discovered that the company had been involved in massive multibillion dollar fraud scheme[2], and several years after that, was discovered to have been involved in hiding the assets of Russian oligarchs around the Mediterranean.[3]) In 2012, the evaluation process for the Teletriumph was divided into two jury categories. National entries were assessed by experts affiliated with the Ukrainian Television Academy, while regional entries were evaluated by members of a separate jury pool known as "Teletriumph-Region."

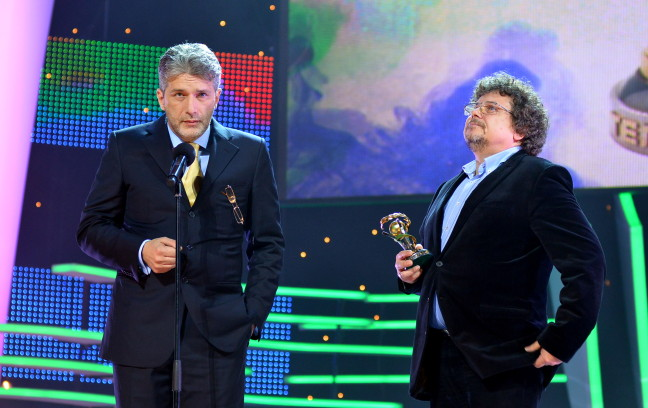
In 2012, The Freedom of Speech on ICTV won the Teletriumph for Best Political Talk Show on Ukrainian television that year. Andriy Kulykov (left) and producer Mykhailo Pavlov (right).

During his 2012 acceptance of the Teletriumph Award for Best Political Talk Show, Andriy Kulykov made an impassioned speech that was cut from the televised broadcast of the event. The awards were presented by individuals dressed in identical outfits, with their faces painted in similar fashions to the members of the Blue Man Group. Kulykov ridiculed this outfit:

"Some people on this stage are painted in blue, red, and green. Orange is missing. When orange disappears, there is no crimson. This should be a warning to all of us. We should not allow our colors to disappear. We must not allow our languages to disappear from our television, we must not allow colleagues to disappear from our community.

But we know how things are arranged: we’re not allowed to show certain colors. We’re not allowed to show certain ideas on our television screens. We’re not allowed to show our solidarity with colleagues. On our show, people of different colors and views work together — and that’s the point. People with different political beliefs — and maybe even some poets — speak their minds freely."

Kulykov was making a reference in that speech to the color orange, which had been the main theme of the Orange Revolution that Kulykov had covered as a journalist live and on the ground. In the edited broadcast aired on Ukraina, only a brief acknowledgment from The Freedom of Speech producer Mykhailo Pavlov was included.

After the conclusion of Teletriumph 2012, numerous articles and commentaries published in the press at the time expressed concerns regarding various aspects of the event, including the nomination process, the work of the jury, the selection of winners, and the overall organization. Although the National Council was a co-founder of the Teletriumph Awards, its involvement in the 2012 edition was minimal. Members of the Council did not participate in the Organizing Committee and played a limited role in the event's preparation and execution.

According to members of the National Council, the critical reception from the media and broadcasting community pointed to the need for a significant review of how the awards are structured and managed. They stressed that this feedback reflected deeper concerns within the television industry and called for an open, comprehensive dialogue about the future direction of the awards. In response, the National Council announced its intention to initiate discussions on potential reforms. Recognizing the broader importance of the issue for Ukraine's television sector, the Council invited industry professionals to participate in shaping the future of the national television awards.

=== Euromaidan, Teletriumph 2013 delayed repeatedly, the first livestream ===
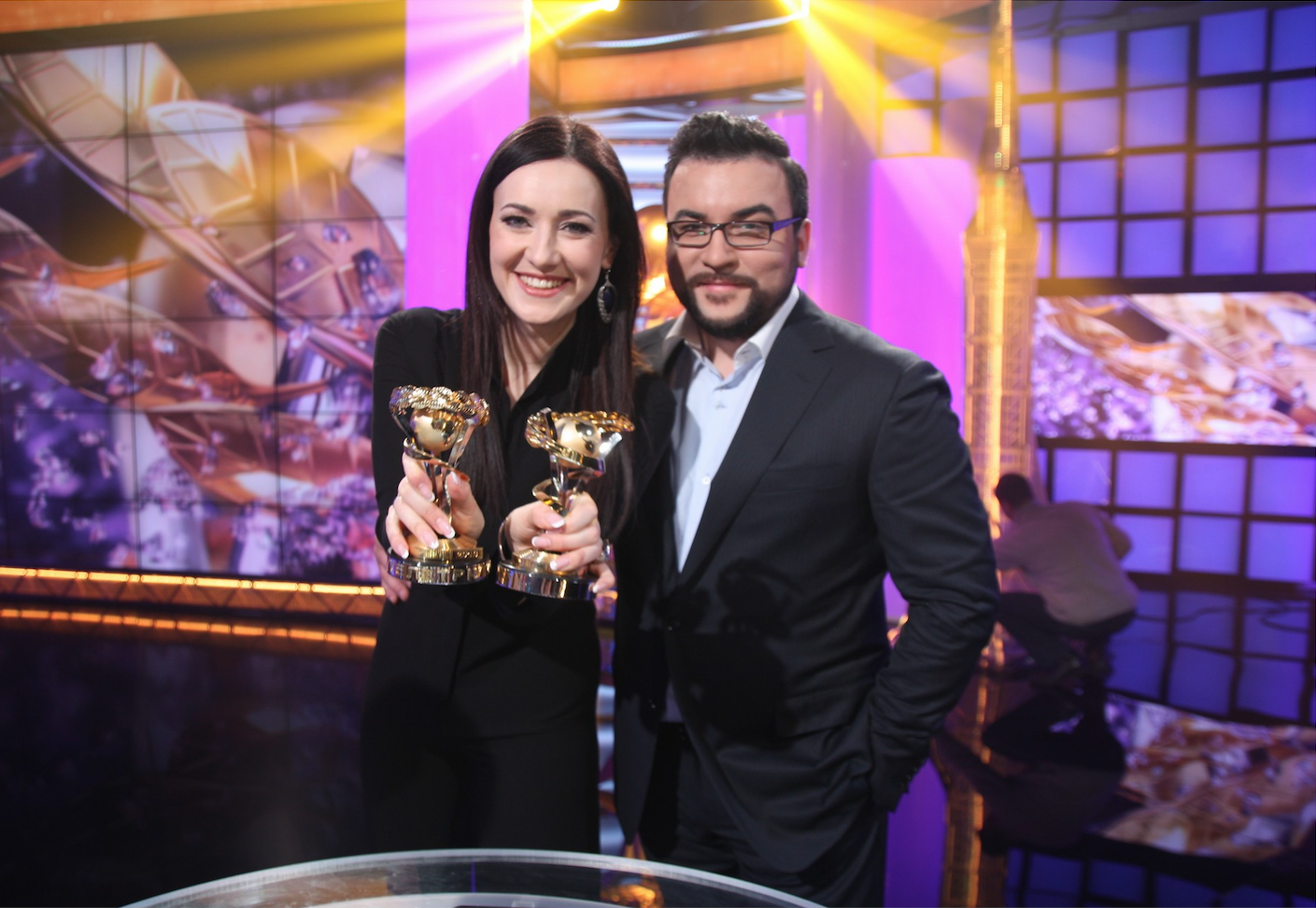
Solomia Vitvitska (left) and Ruslan Senichkin (right) presented the online broadcast for Teletriumph 2013, the national television awards of Ukraine. This was the only online broadcast of the awards.

In 2013, contextualized by the Euromaidan, tensions within the Ukrainian television community were so great that the awards were repeatedly postponed. The tension that had already existed between Ukrainian language and Russian language local stations that had caused so much controversy in past years was at a zenith during 2013.

In November, Savik Shuster announced that he had withdrawn from the organizing committee in determining the winners of the award. He declined to comment publicly at the time as to his reasons for withdrawing from the process.

The nominees for 2013 were announced at the end of November. The 2013 ceremony was originally scheduled to be hosted on December 4, at the October Palace, but massive protests broke out in Kyiv only three days before the scheduled date, causing the awards to be delayed. The October Palace is only 500 feet away from Independence Square, where the bulk of the Euromaidan protests and the following events of the Revolution of Dignity occurred.

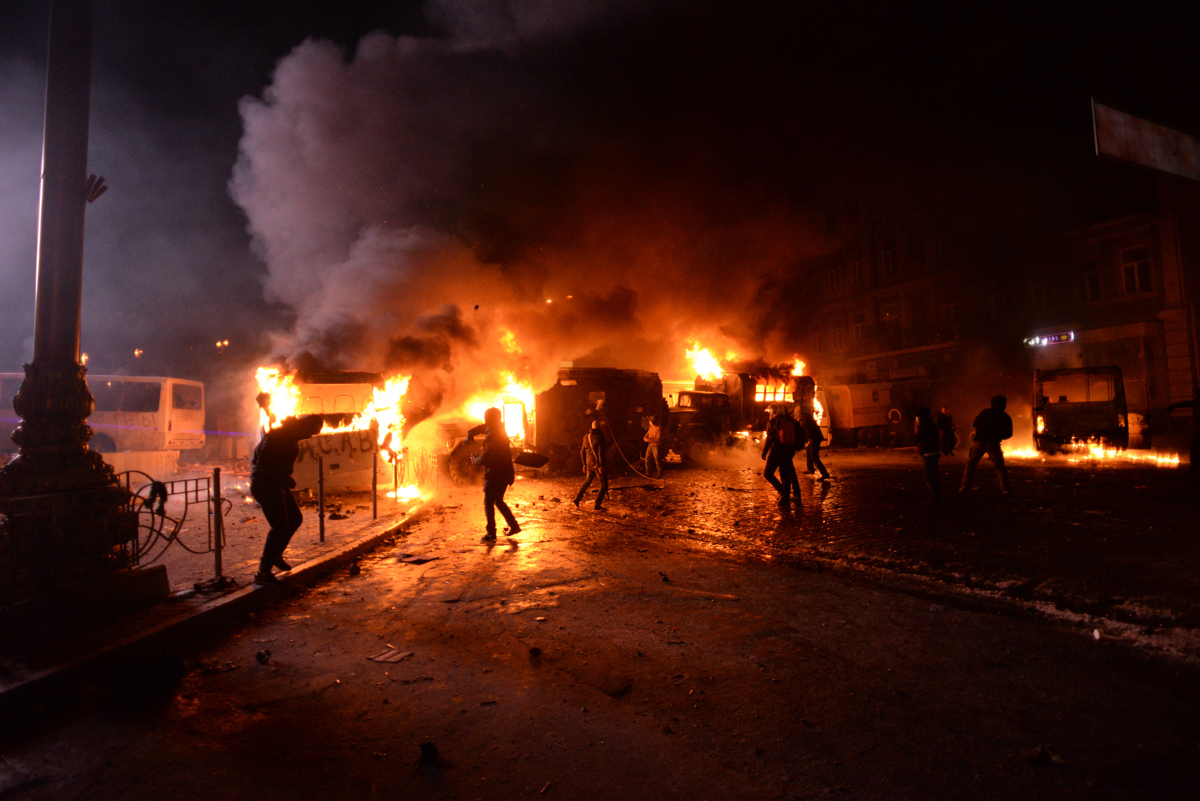
Teletriumph 2013 was constantly delayed by the Euromaidan, having been originally scheduled to be hosted in the October Palace, which was in the heart of the protests, and only 500 feet from Independence Square.

On the 2nd of December, the organizers of the ceremony decided to delay Teletriumph 2013 until January 23, 2014, anticipating that the protests would be finished at that point, and the venue would be accessible.

Teletriumph 2013 was ultimately not held until February 13, 2014 – at the tail-end of the Euromaidan. However, the awards could not be hosted at the October Palace, because the bridge in front of the building was on fire, and revolutionaries were being shot in front of the building.

Instead of selecting a new venue for the awards, the television channel which had won the contract for Teletriumph 2013, 1+1, decided to experiment with hosting the awards as a livestreamed online broadcast on their website. Teletriumph 2013 was the first-ever livestreamed award in the history of the Teletriumphs.

=== Russian invasion of Crimea, Teletriumph 2014 cancelled, merged with 2015 ===
Less than 30 days after Teletriumph 2013 was held, the Russian Federation invaded Crimea.

In October 2014, due to the ongoing political and economic situation in Ukraine, it was announced that there would be no awards ceremony held for Teletriumph 2014, and the awards were postponed indefinitely, tentatively until 2015. The decision was then made to combine the 2014 awards with 2015, and the event was officially named Teletriumph 2014–2015. However, even by September 2015, the date of the awards had not been officially announced.

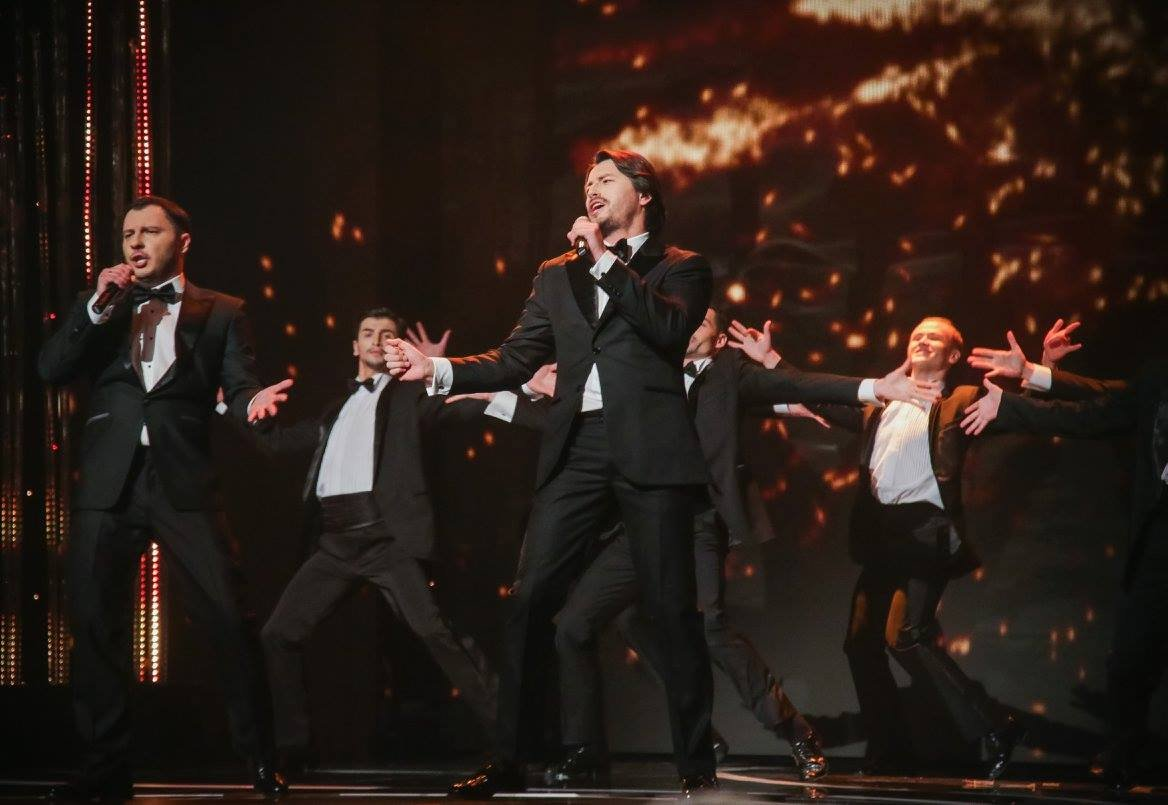
Serhiy Prytula and Dmytro Tankovych, the comedic duo co-hosted Teletriumph 2014–2015, which was held at the National Opera of Ukraine. Pictured here leading a song and dance session at Teletriumph 2014–2015.

In October 2015, Inter Media Group decided to withdraw from the nomination process for the awards, stating publicly:

"...until peace and stability have come to Ukraine, we consider it untimely to put forward for participation in the competition program of the entertainment genre. Of course, our partners and production studios who produce programs for INTER can independently put forward their projects – this is their right."

Teletriumph 2014–2015 was held on December 2, 2015, at the National Opera of Ukraine. The general tone of the ceremony leaned toward entertainment. Co-hosts Dmytro Tankovych and Serhiy Prytula provided comic relief, often engaging in playful commentary about the industry and their colleagues. However, there were also jabs at network executives and critiques of internal politics within media organizations. Some reporters and journalists noted that this was perhaps the first truly successful Teletriumph ceremony in replicating the atmosphere of a major awards show like the Oscars.

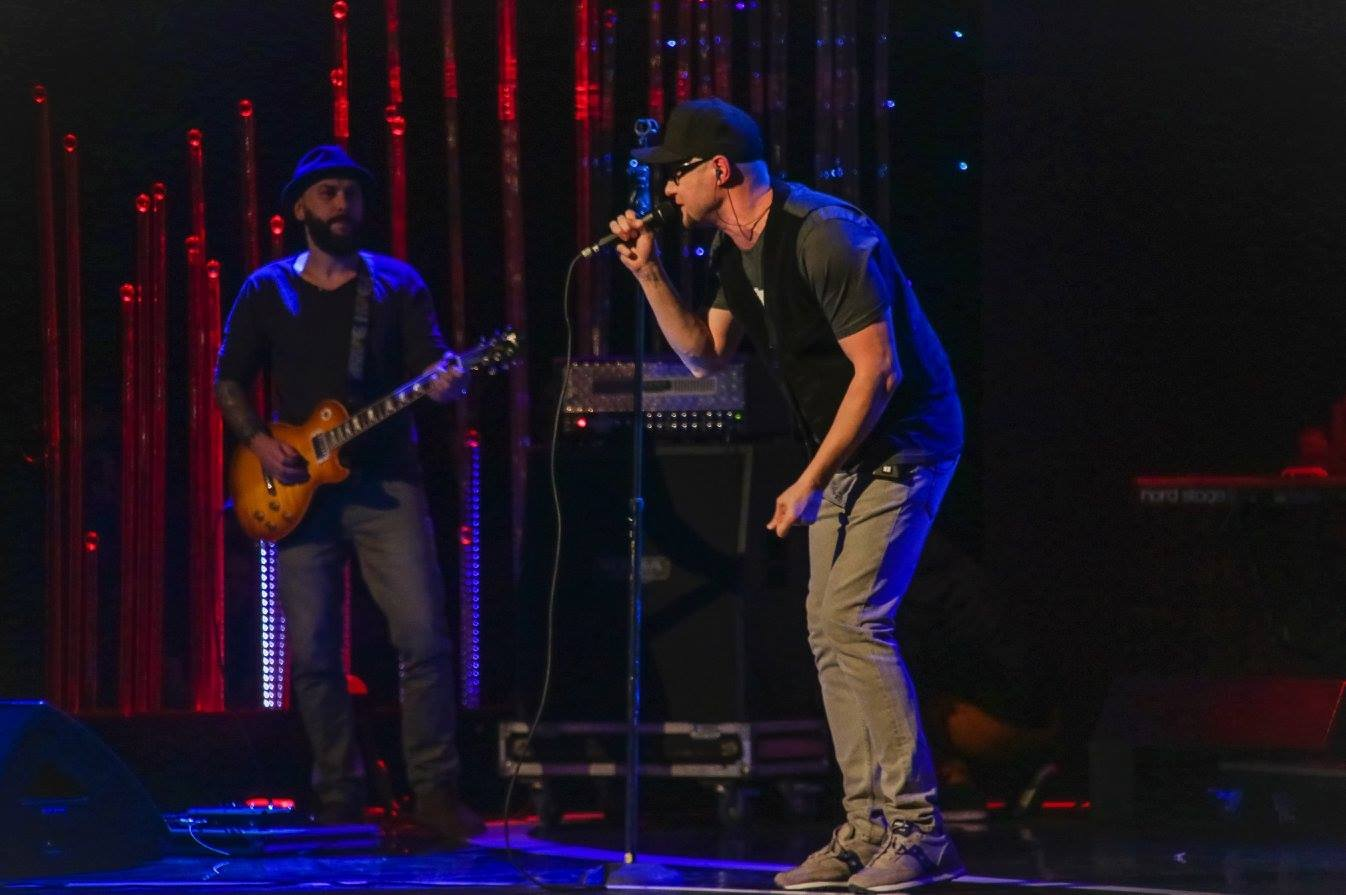
The Ukrainian rock band BoomBox performs live at Teletriumph 2014–2015.

Jamala, BoomBox, and Dmytro Shurov performed live music at the event, and were reportedly excellent in their performances, but were inhibited by some major technical shortcomings like inconsistent sound quality. Throughout the evening, attendees also observed that a significant number of guests left before the ceremony concluded, particularly during the award segments related to television serials and industry acknowledgments.

The ceremony also addressed serious topics, especially in a dedicated segment recognizing journalists and documentary producers covering conflict zones and national crises. Presenters used this portion of the ceremony to reflect on the role of media in reporting from eastern Ukraine and the broader challenges facing the profession.

Despite the fact that around this era of the Ukrainian television industry, the corporate managers and owners of many Ukrainian television channels were considering consolidating their – all of the television films that won awards in 2014–2015 were produced by independent production studios such as Star Media and Film.UA.

Teletriumph 2014–2015 was marred by the continuing domination of major Ukrainian media groups, particularly StarLightMedia and 1+1 Media, and marked the significant presence of entertainment and socially-oriented programming on national television. In public media discourse, discussions about transparency and fairness surrounded the ceremony. Vladimir Borodyansky and Yevgeny Lyashchenko were the only two heads of the "Big Four" media groups of Ukraine that showed up.

Under the backdrop of infighting in the television industry, Volodymyr Zelenskyy alone received a record number of nominations at Teletriumph 2014–2015 – eleven in total – as an actor, host, producer, and director through his production company Kvartal 95. However, even more notable was one of the major speeches he gave entirely mocking the television industry and the awards process.

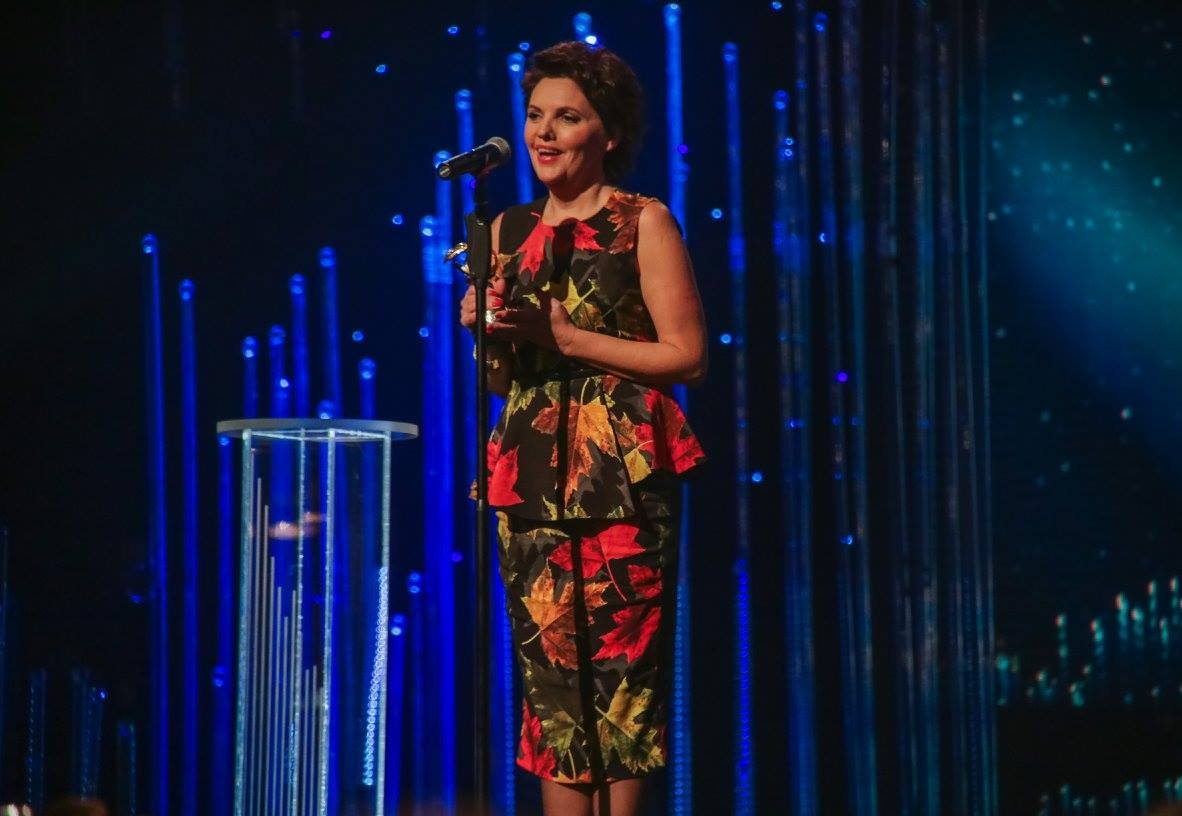
Elena Frolyak, the host of Facts on ICTV wins an award at Teletriumph 2014–2015.

The awards also revealed continued gender disparities in nomination lists, particularly in talk show categories, where male hosts were more frequently recognized. Nonetheless, leading female journalists such as Alla Mazur (1+1) and Oksana Sokolova (ICTV) were nominated in information-related categories.

The awards also maintained their traditional focus on fiction, awarding numerous serials and telenovelas, including "The Last Moskal" (1+1 production), Sniffer (Film.UA), and works by screenwriter Tatyana Gnedash. In musical programming, projects celebrating major cultural events, such as Tina Karol: The Power of Love and Voice, were among the few nominees, indicating limited diversity in televised music content.

=== No televised broadcast in 2016, but overall a successful event ===
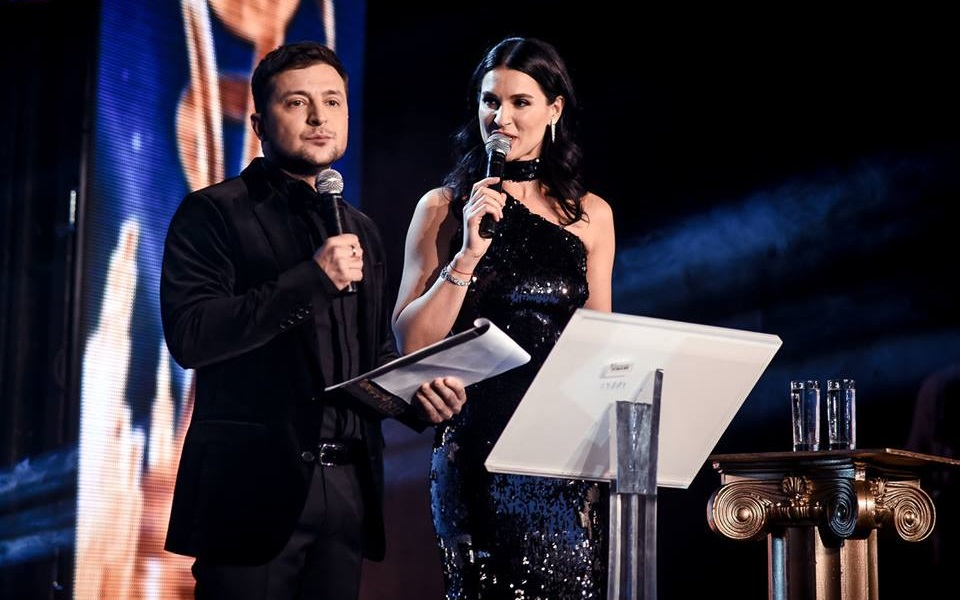
Teletriumph 2016 was held at Freedom Hall in Kyiv, and was not televised. Volodymyr Zelenskyy cohosted the event with Masha Efrosynina. The evening's script was written by Kvartal 95.

Teletriumph 2016, held on December 9, 2016, was hosted at the Freedom Event Hall in Kyiv. This year, the ceremony was organized by Starlight Entertainment, a live events company owned by StarLightMedia, and the script was written by Kvartal 95. Volodymyr Zelenskyy cohosted the event with Masha Efrosynina. 2016's ceremony was not televised, breaking from previously established tradition.

Commenting on the decision not to televise the ceremony, Igor Koval said:

"The explanation is simple: this year we are forced to economize. Additionally, it is difficult to produce a quality television version from the selected chamber venue, one that could occupy a prime evening slot and achieve appropriate ratings. This year’s ceremony is primarily intended to honor the work of the nominees and television industry professionals."

The ceremony, therefore, adopted a "reduced-budget format." The event took place in a banquet setting, allowing attendees to remain seated throughout the proceedings. This informal arrangement was widely credited with encouraging full participation from industry figures, many of whom stayed until the end of the event—a notable change from previous years.

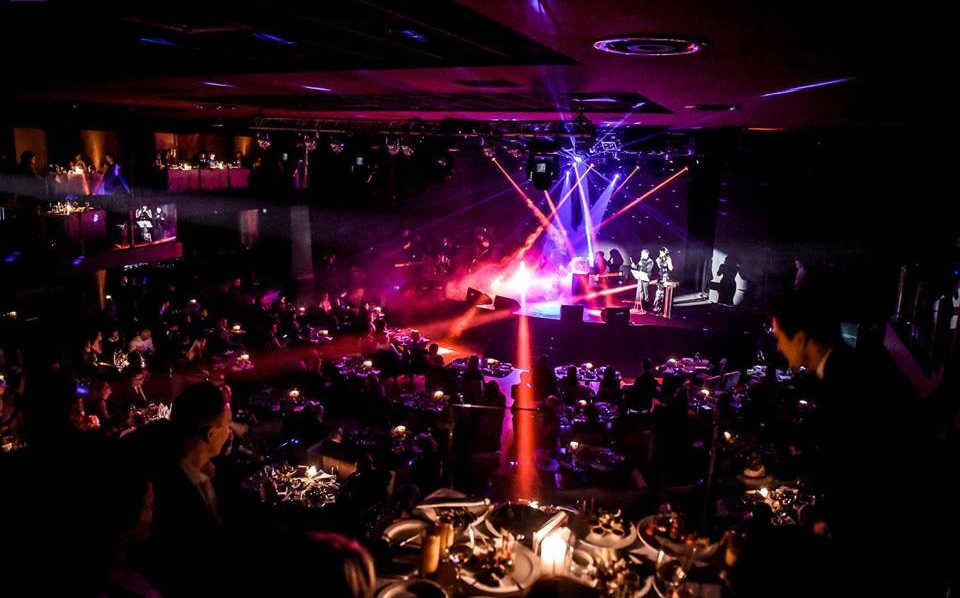
The company "MEDIATECH" worked much of the lighting and sound for Teletriumph 2016. Starlight Entertainment, a division of Starlight Media (the company founded by Victor Pinchuk), was the event organizer.

The hosts, Zelenskyy and Efrosinina, delivered light, mostly restrained commentary, often referencing the minimalist format. Humor during the ceremony focused on the budgetary constraints, with satirical remarks about limited spending and unexpected guest performances. However, Zelenskyy reportedly delivered a biting punchline about the absence of Inter Media Group from the event.

Continuing their protests that the awards should not be held during such a politically volatile time in Ukraine, not a single employee of Inter Media Group attended the 2016 awards, and the company publicly lodged a protest with the organizers of the event. Inter did not nominate and did not submit any entries. Following the event, the group released a public statement criticizing the timing of the awards, citing the economic and political challenges affecting the television industry and advertising market in Ukraine.

For many years until this point, organizers of the Teletriumph Awards had faced the recurring challenge of keeping key industry figures – what the newsmagazine Media Detector called "main characters of the holiday" — present throughout the entire ceremony. In 2016, however, they succeeded in accomplishing what had previously seemed unattainable: all prominent guests, including leading producers, directors, broadcasters, and performers, remained in attendance until the conclusion of the event. Media Detector reported that the attendees attributed this achievement in part to a significant change in format: guests were, for the first time in the history of the awards, allowed to enjoy food and refreshments directly at their tables without needing to exit the venue. This arrangement not only fostered a more relaxed and convivial atmosphere but also contributed to sustained audience engagement, making the event feel more like a communal celebration, rather than a formal awards show.

=== No awards in 2017, Television Academy creates six new guilds ===
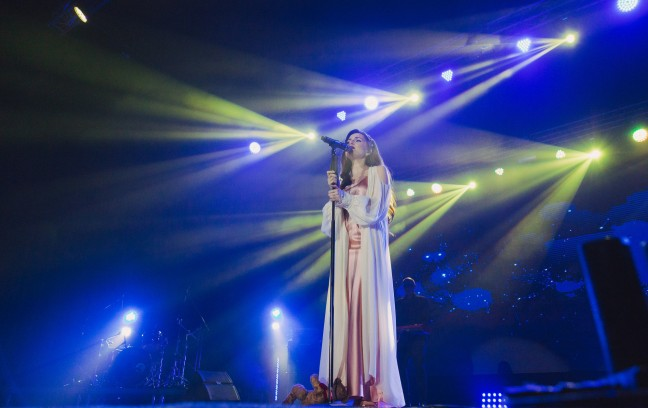
Solomia Lukyanets returned to perform at Teletriumph 2018, which was held without a televised broadcast at Stereo Plaza.

In 2017, the Teletriumphs were postponed, and no awards were held in 2017. The Teletriumph was scheduled for reorganization, following an initiative by the "Expert Council" of the Television Academy. The changes included both structural adjustments and revisions to the rules governing the evaluation of submissions. The decision was made jointly by the ITC and the Television Academy to postpone the competition and the associated Teletriumphs until the spring of 2018.

The postponement aimed to accommodate the evolving landscape of Ukrainian television, which had seen the emergence of thematic and niche channels, the growth of digital media formats, and the development of new genres. Recognizing the limited presence of specialized professional awards in the field, the Expert Council proposed expanding the range of award categories. This expansion was intended to enable broader participation among industry professionals and contribute to the establishment of nationally recognized standards for quality and professionalism in broadcasting.

According to ITC Director Ihor Koval, the new scheduling of the competition would allow the inclusion of television projects aired between September 1, 2016, and December 31, 2017. In subsequent years, the awards would evaluate projects aired during the standard calendar year, from January 1 to December 31.

The chair of the Expert Council of the Ukrainian Television Academy, Olga Zakharova, said:

"Now the working group of the Expert Council is working on the changes in the regulations of the competition. The voting will take place in professional Guilds, which will be part of the Ukrainian Television Academy. The main principles of evaluation of works are openness, honesty and individuality of voting."

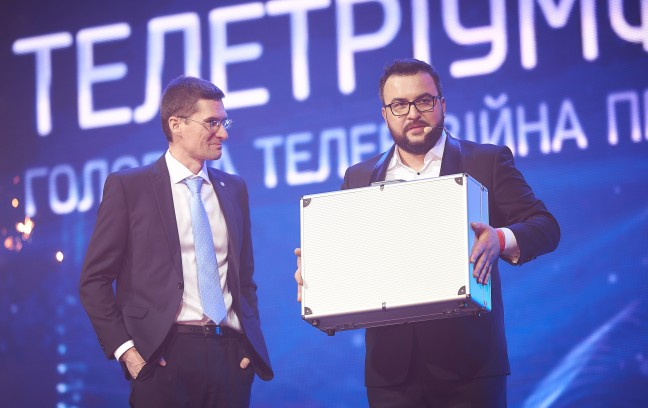
Ruslan Senichkin (right) also co-hosted the 2018 awards, which were not televised. The Director of PricewaterhouseCoopers Ukraine (PwC), Dmitriy Grinchishin (left), is pictured here presenting Senichkin with the ballots at Teletriumph 2018, held without a broadcast at Stereo Plaza.

As part of the reform, the Ukrainian Television Academy established six professional guilds, each representing a specific sector of the television industry. From that point onward, the jury for the Teletriumph has been composed exclusively of Academy members affiliated with these guilds. Each guild is responsible for voting on award categories that correspond to its area of professional expertise. The previously distinct regional jury pool was integrated into the general structure of the Academy. Regional representatives became full members of the Television Academy and were included in the professional guilds, thereby participating in the broader, unified evaluation process.

Teletriumph 2018 was held on April 25 at the Stereo Plaza Concert Hall in Kyiv. Teletriumph 2018 was also not televised, with no television version or broadcast, again held in a banquet format, with a cocktail dress code. It was presented by three pairs; the Schumacher Brothers, Natalia Garipova and Lesya Nikityuk, Marichka Padalko and Ruslan Senichkin.

The awards were again cancelled in 2019, due to collaborative disagreements between the ceremony and awards organizers. However, with the rise of COVID-19 in 2020, most awards ceremonies in Ukraine were cancelled, and the Russians invaded shortly thereafter, meaning that the Teletriumphs have not been awarded since 2018. However, the awards are not permanently cancelled, as was reported by Medianannya in 2019: "So, dear readers, be patient if you are waiting for "Teletriumph..."

== Jury selection ==
The Teletriumphs are adjudicated by a jury composed of professionals from various sectors of the Ukrainian television industry. Jury members are selected based on professional experience and sector-specific qualifications. Eligibility for the jury requires a minimum of five years of professional experience in television. Jurors must be members of one of six professional guilds that correspond to specific areas of television production. Each juror participates only in evaluating categories relevant to their area of expertise. This structure is intended to ensure that nominations are assessed by individuals with appropriate subject-matter knowledge.

Voting Procedure

The voting process consists of two stages. In the first stage, jurors participate in online voting, assigning scores to nominees. The second stage involves in-person meetings of the relevant guilds, where final decisions are made through open discussion and additional voting. This two-stage process is designed to combine independent evaluation with collective review.

Guilds

The guild system is intended to align evaluation responsibilities with jurors’ professional areas, contributing to more specialized and consistent assessments across categories. The six Ukrainian Television Guilds are;

- Producers Guild – includes producers of television programs, films, and series, as well as executive producers affiliated with broadcasters and media organizations.
- Directors and Screenwriters Guild
- Cinematographers, Production Designers, and Lighting Specialists Guild
- Information, Sports, and Social Broadcasting Guild
- Children's, Music, and Thematic Programming Guild
- Television Design and Promotion Guild

== Categories ==
=== Program and Genre Categories ===
- Best Feature TV Series
- Best Feature TV Movie/Mini-Series
- Best TV Sitcom/Sketch Comedy
- Best Reality Show
- Best Talent Show
- Best Music Program / Concert / Ceremony
- Best Entertainment Program for Children and Teenagers
- Best Thematic Entertainment Program (Lifestyle Format)
- Best Information-Entertainment TV Program
- Best Sports Program / Show

=== Hosting and Presentation Categories ===
- Best Host of Entertainment Program
- Best Host of Morning / Daytime Information and Entertainment Program
- Best Host of Sports Program
- Best Interviewer
- Best Host of Information Program
- Best Host of Information-Analytical Program

=== Creative and Production Categories ===
- Best Director (Director's Crew) of TV Show
- Best Director of TV Movie / Series
- Best Producer (Producer's Crew) of TV Movie / Series
- Best Writer (Writer's Crew) of TV Movie / Series
- Best Writer (Writer's Crew) of TV Show
- Best Cinematographer of TV Show
- Best Cinematographer of TV Movie / Series
- Best Production Designer – Film / TV Series
- Best Music Design / Sound Design of Film, Series, Program
- Best Stage Designer of Show, Concert, Ceremony

=== Special and Miscellaneous Categories ===
- Opening of the Year
- Discovery of the Year
- Best Promotion / Promo Campaign
- Leader of Any Format – Region
- Personal contribution to the development of the Ukrainian television industry
- Special award from the Journalism guild

== Award year statistics ==
Year	Number of Categories	Number of Applications Submitted	Number of Experts	Date of ceremony	Venue	Television Broadcast
2001	14	115	72	April 25	Palace Ukraine	No broadcast.
2002	21	258	100	March 22	President Hotel	No broadcast.
2003	20	217	103	April 5	President Hotel	No broadcast.
2004	17	250	66	March 26	October Palace	INTER
2005	20	251	106	June 25	Zaporizhzhia	No contract. Multiple channels.
2006	19	256	76	June 23	Palace Ukraine	1+1
2007	19	254	118	June 23	Palace Ukraine	Novyi Kanal
2008	19	263	69	August 29	National Opera of Ukraine	UA:First
2009	24	223	89	September 4	October Palace	1+1
2010	47	300	40	October 14	October Palace	Novyi Kanal
2011	39	292	90	November 17	National Opera of Ukraine	INTER
2012	51	364	112	November 30	Palace Ukraine	Ukraine
2013	Euromaidan. Teletriumph 2013 delayed until 2014.					
2013	46	332	161	February 13, 2014	Online stream	1+1 (online)
2014	Russia invades Crimea. 2014 awards cancelled, merged with 2015 awards.					
2015	42	345	196	December 2	National Opera of Ukraine	STB
2016	42	320	167	December 8	Freedom Event Hall, Kyiv	No broadcast, invitation only.
2017	Ukrainian television industry disputes. No awards are given in 2017.					
2018	73			April 25	Stereo Plaza, Kyiv	No broadcast, invitation only.
2019	Ukrainian television industry disputes. National Television Council and Television Academy deliberate on new categories. Awards cancelled.					
2020	COVID-19 pandemic. Awards cancelled.					
2021	COVID-19 pandemic. Awards cancelled.					
2022	Russia invades Ukraine. Awards cancelled. Indefinitely postponed.					
2023	Russia invades Ukraine. Awards cancelled. Indefinitely postponed.					
2024	Russia invades Ukraine. Awards cancelled. Indefinitely postponed.					
2025	Russia invades Ukraine. Awards cancelled. Indefinitely postponed.					

== See also ==
- Golden Dzyga
- British Academy Film Awards
- Emmy Awards
