= Tatiana Tsymbal =

Ukrainian journalist and news presenter

- Тетя́на Ци́мбал
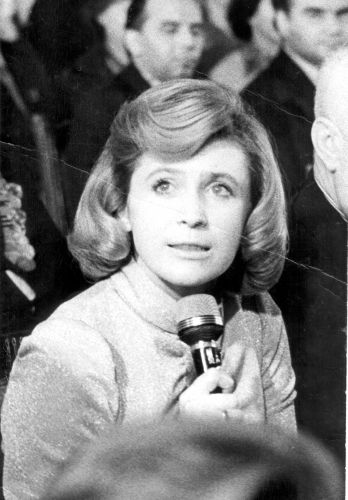
- Born: September 14, 1946 (age 79); Kyiv, Ukrainian Soviet Socialist Republic, USSR
- Education: Taras Shevchenko National University of Kyiv
- Awards: People's Artist of Ukraine; Merited Artist of Ukraine; Teletriumph; Veteran of National Television; Woman of the Third Millennium; Novomedia Award for the Popularization of Eternal Values; Person of the Year

Tatiana Vasilyvna Tsymbal (Ukrainian: Тетяна Василівна Цимбал; born September 14, 1946) is a Ukrainian journalist, news presenter, producer, and broadcaster. She is a member of the Ukrainian Association of Cinematographers. She also earned the Woman of the Third Millennium prize. She was on the ground as a journalist during the Chernobyl disaster. She hosted the Teletriumph Awards for the first three years of their existence. She was on Ukrainian television for over 50 years, and recently retired.

Tsymbal teaches journalism at the National University of Life and Environmental Sciences, and was formerly a professor at Kyiv International University. Studying and working under the first television broadcasters in Ukraine, she eventually helped shape the modern Ukrainian television industry, and has been named by Focus as one of the most influential women in Ukraine.

== Early life ==
Tsymbal's father was a Ukrainian soldier who was deployed to the Eastern Front during World War II. He was captured on the island of Eisele, in the Baltic sea, during a campaign in Finland, but managed to escape. He was captured two more times by the Germans, but escaped. Her mother remained in Ukraine, living in the Volynsyva post, and was caring for a son during the German occupation of Ukraine. Tsymbal's older brother died during the German occupation, before she was born.

Her father was an engineer before the war, and after the war returned home and worked in the "South-West Transbud," working to rebuild the city of Kyiv. The family lived in a small communal apartment. Her father once brought her to one of the villages they were building during reconstruction to show her what life would be like when the country was rebuilt. At the center of the village was a train station that he had designed: Vokzalna train station, which has since been greatly expanded. Her father also participated in the design and construction of Palace Ukraine, and Tsymbal was one of the first people in the building before it opened to the public.

== Career in journalism ==
Tsymbal attended the school of Romance and Germanic Philology at Taras Shevchenko National University of Kyiv. While still a student at university, Tsymbal began her professional journey in journalism by working with the youth editorial division of Ukrainian Television (UT), the Ukrainian language branch of Soviet Central Television. She contributed to the development and production of several prominent Soviet youth-oriented programs, such as:

- I + You (Я + Ти), a program that explored topics relevant to young audiences through personal storytelling and cultural dialogue
- Komsomolskaya Tradition (Комсомольська традиція), which highlighted the activities, values, and historical legacy of the Komsomol (the youth wing of the Communist Party)
- Komsomol Stars (Зірки комсомолу), a program focused on showcasing the achievements of outstanding young leaders and innovators within the Soviet Union

=== Khreshchatyk 26 ===
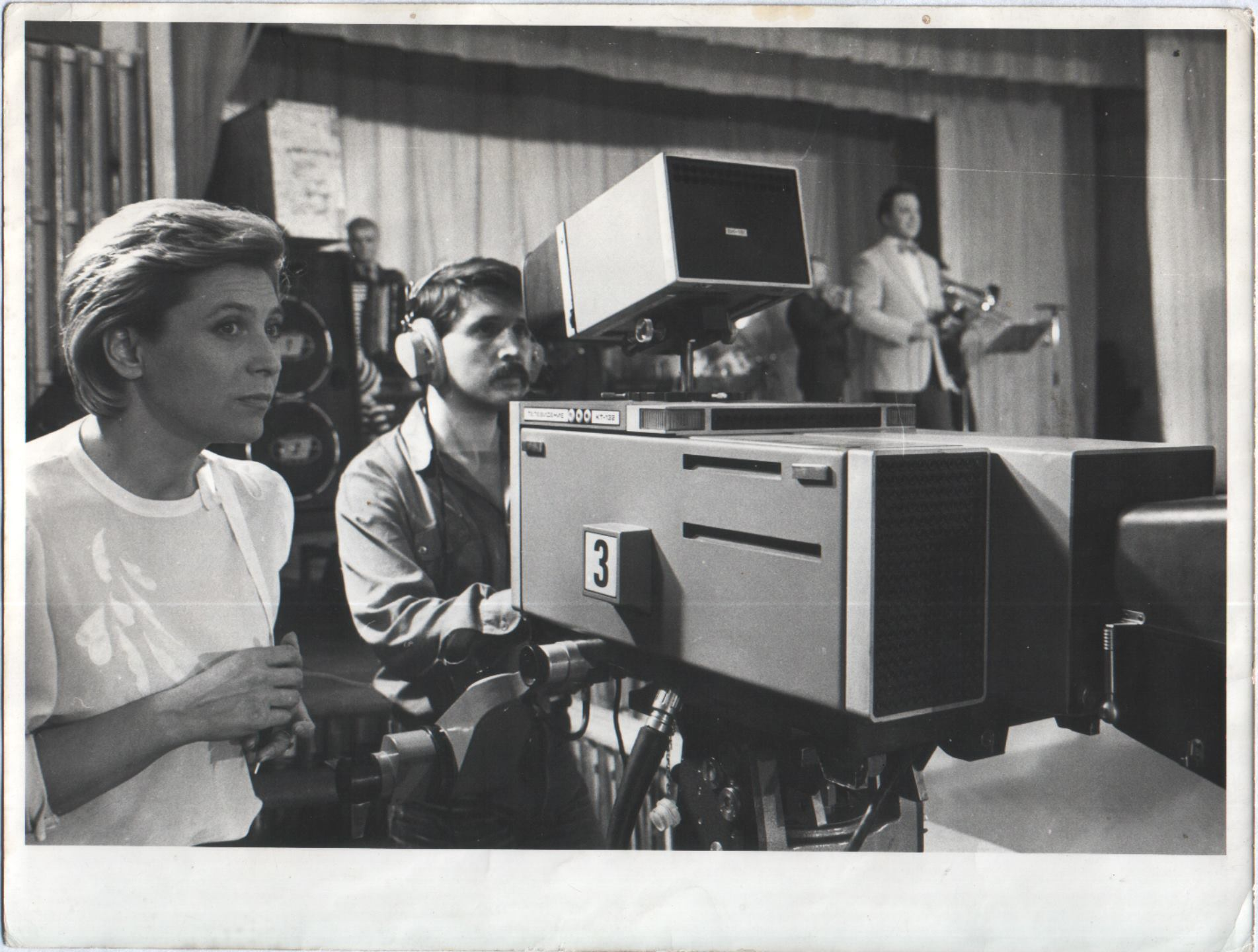
Tsymbal (left), pictured here running through a rehearsal for a show at Kyiv Television and Radio Center.

After graduating in 1969, Tsymbal continued her professional work in journalism at the State Committee for Television and Radio-broadcasting. The committee ran several state media broadcast channels at the time, including UT, and what is now known as Suspilne. At the time, formal training in journalism was not a requirement for television work, but entry into the field was highly competitive. Tsymbal went through a rigorous public selection process in 1968. Criteria for applicants—especially men—included not only vocal qualities such as a deep timbre, but also a "textured" appearance and a height of no less than 180 cm.

Tsymbal began her career in presenting Ukrainian television during the formative years of national broadcasting, working at the historic Kyiv Television and Radio Center informally referred to by the name of its street address, Khreshchatyk 26, on Khreshchatyk Street in Kyiv. This facility, purpose-built for state broadcasting, featured sound-insulated oak doors and specialized studios, including a prominent 300-meter main studio and a smaller color studio—among the first of their kind in Ukraine. Khreshchatyk 26 was a center of pioneering techniques in television; the first remote broadcasts were performed only a few years before by rolling corded cameras onto the street to capture B roll, and producers were creating new formats that had never existed. This site became a central hub not only for employees and on-air talent but also for guests, filmmakers, and viewers who engaged with the programming being produced. The broadcasting facilities were heavily secured, with police presence.

She was first auditioned by Andrii Ivenko, a renowned figure in Soviet broadcasting often compared to Yuri Levitan for his deep, commanding voice. Tsymbal, along with other newcomers, underwent rigorous training in speech and performance under prominent mentors such as Olena Dmytrivna Kovalenko and Mykola Pohrebnin. The preparatory process included lessons in diction, stage movement, and cultural education, including visits to museums and instruction from leading artists of the time. Tsymbal entered the profession through a highly competitive selection process that included 80 applicants. Alongside peers like Tamara Strachenko, she completed an intensive six-month training program before beginning her broadcast work. Her first appearance on air was a brief announcement introducing a children's fairy tale program. Tsymbal managed the performance under the guidance of senior colleagues, such as Anatolii Guzeiev.

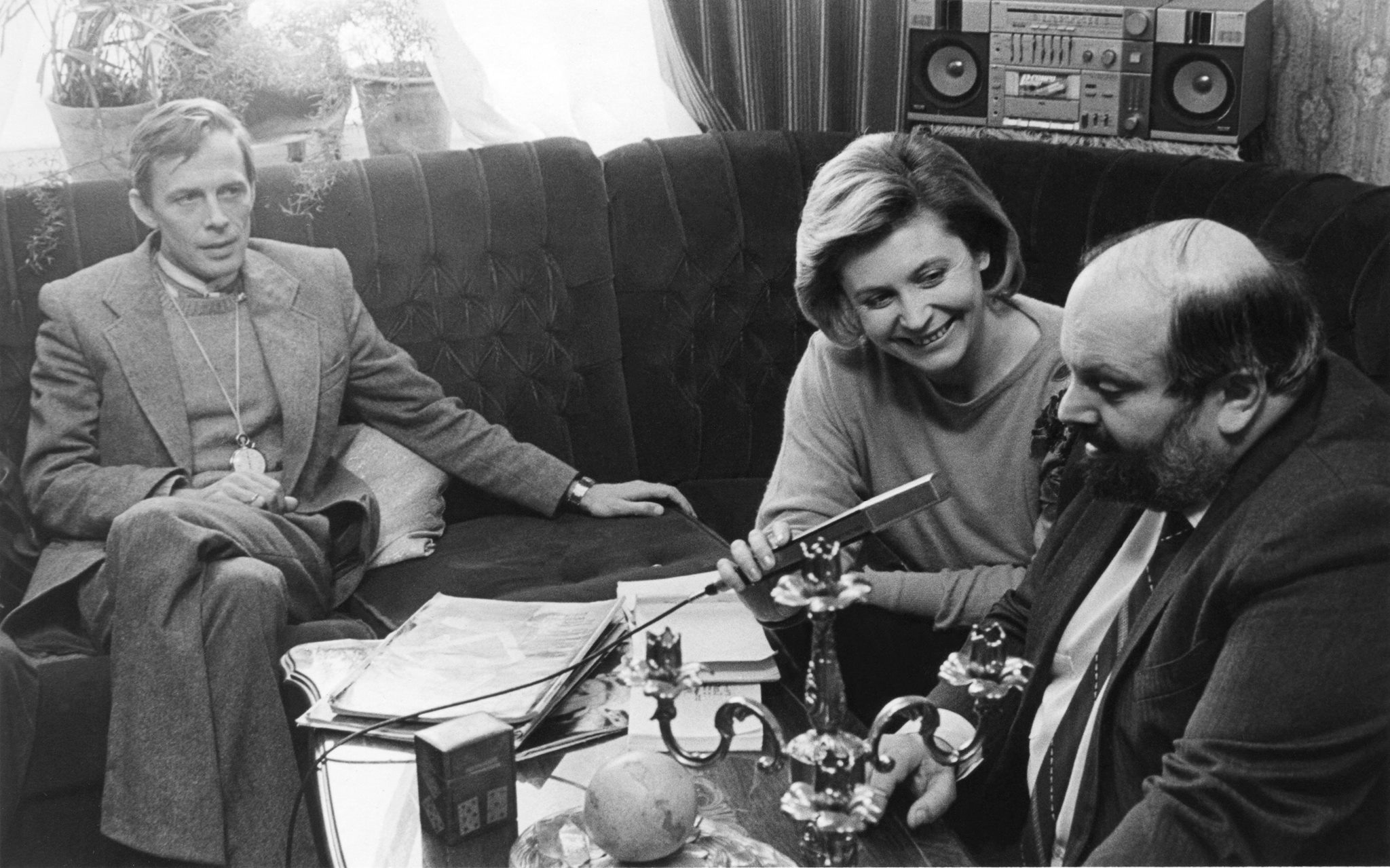
Tsymbal was also involved in the production of public radio broadcasts for the Soviet public broadcasting network, and was trained by some of the best radio broadcasters in the country.

Television in Ukraine during that period was a new and largely unexplored medium. While it had already attracted a number of prominent radio professionals who became the "founders" of the field, it was regarded more as a form of artistic expression than journalism in the modern sense. The term "journalist" was not yet in widespread use in the context of broadcasting; instead, roles were labeled more generally as "editors."

During this period, Tsymbal worked with some of the earliest figures in Ukrainian television history, including Nikolai Ivanovych Pohrebnin, who authored a specialized orcheo-poetic dictionary for television professionals. Notably, she collaborated for almost two years with Olga Danylenko, widely regarded as the first Ukrainian television announcer, before Danylenko's death in 1970. Danylenko was celebrated for her poise and appearance, and her public visibility was considered an event in itself during the Soviet era. The cultural status of television figures in early Ukrainian media were often perceived with the reverence typically reserved for public icons or even cosmonauts. Announcers were originally limited to informational delivery but gradually helped shape the identity of television itself.

Tsymbal became prominent presenter on the public broadcasting station UT-1 (Ukrainian First National), and was subsequently described in Ukrainian media as one of the recognizable faces of Ukrainian television. For several generations of viewers, she was also associated with Soviet-era state television broadcasting.

=== Introduction of color television ===
Tsymbal was present for the introduction of color television in Ukraine, and with it came a shift in thinking about appearance on television. In the 1970s, Tsymbal appeared on the cover of the magazine Ukraina, identified as “an announcer of Ukrainian color television.” Television presenters at the time were expected to maintain a high standard of style and personal appearance, despite widespread shortages of consumer goods in Soviet Ukraine. Now though, color television could show flaws that otherwise might have not been seen on black and white television. Acknowledging this, station and Committee leadership arranged for special access to clothing through the Soviet Kyiv Department of Commerce. As a result, presenters were granted entry to a special department within the Central Department Store (TsUM), typically reserved for diplomats and scientists, where they could obtain quality garments suited to their on-air responsibilities.

=== Chernoby disaster ===
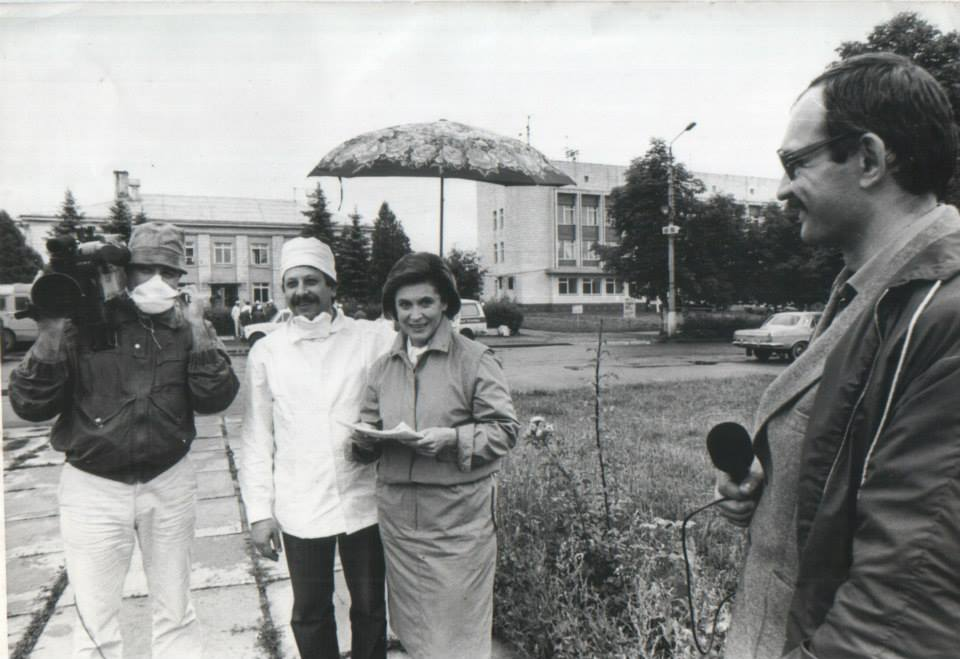
Tsymbal and her team were dispatched to report on the Chernobyl disaster in 1986. Pictured with Tsymbal: Nikolay Alekseevich Yarova (left), Viktor Spivakov (2nd from left), Alexander Suldin (Right).

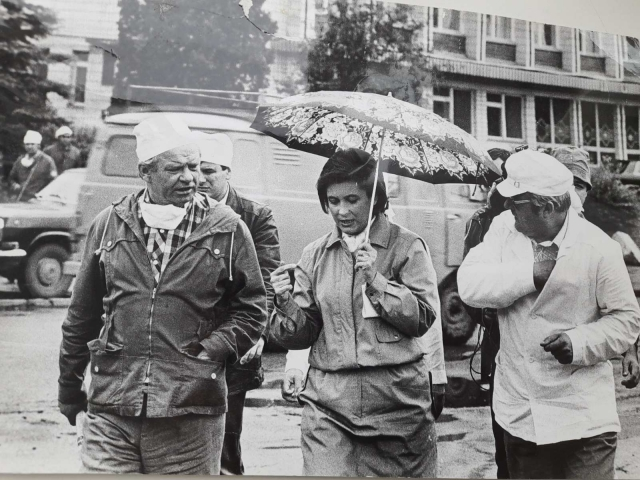
Later in the reporting from Chernobyl. Her umbrella is not for rain, it is for nuclear fallout.

In 1986, following the Chernobyl nuclear disaster, Valentin Antonovich Yurchenko was exposed to radiation after being the first person to capture film of Chernobyl. Tsymbal was then dispatched with her team to the disaster zone, where they took part in a special program dedicated to meetings and dialogues in the affected region, called The Consequences of Chernobyl. The broadcasts and interviews they conducted contributed to early public understanding of the scale of the tragedy and helped humanize the experiences of those directly impacted –and especially contributed to a growing sense of public distrust in the Soviet government.

Cameras were not allowed to leave the exclusion zone. Equipment, microphones, tapes, all had to be remotely transmitted and then disposed. The fear of nuclear contamination was so great that even the clothes that journalists entered the zone with had to be disposed of prior to exiting the zone.

On the fifth anniversary of the disaster, she also participated in the landmark television marathon The Bells of Chornobyl (Дзвони Чорнобиля), one of the first extended telethons in Soviet Ukraine. The broadcast marathon was set up in order to raise awareness about the disaster and mobilize public support and disaster recovery assistance for the victims and first responders of the nuclear accident.

On the thirtieth anniversary of the disaster, in 2016, Ukrainian public television released a documentary about the experiences of journalists in the wake of Chernobyl called A Work Trip from Hell.

=== 1991 Independence Referendum ===
As television in Ukraine transitioned from a centralized state medium to a more pluralistic media environment, the once-rare and prestigious status of television presenters evolved accordingly. Tsymbal had already been working in television for over twenty years by the time of the 1991 Ukrainian independence referendum, and was working in the studio on December 1, the day that over 92% of Ukrainian voters supported state sovereignty. At the time, she was still working at the studio on Khreshchatyk Street, where she participated in programming that included "political roundtables," precursors to modern talk shows. In interviews with journalists, Tsymbal has described the atmosphere in the station as "a powerful sense of unity across Ukraine’s diverse population despite previous hardships and tensions."

Tsymbal remained in state broadcasting even while the nature of the Ukrainian state itself transitioned from the former Soviet government to the new Western-style liberal democracy. The channel, however, was mostly staffed by people who supported the new independence, including Tsymbal. They ran a dedicated marathon on the day of independence that they called Studio December 1st, which included specially written and created programming about independence.

In an interview given in 2023, Tsymbal said:

"We knew at the time that Ukraine was rich. We had black soil. We had mountains, and we had the forest, and the seas. We had a thriving aircraft industry. We knew that Lviv created televisions... but what we didn't know at the time, and soon learned, was that the Russians had designed the system of the Soviet Union so that if cathode ray TVs were made in Lviv, the cathode rays were made in Russia. This system created a lot of problems."

In 1992, construction was completed on the new Kyiv Television Center, a large building that would house public television from that point. Tsymbal made the move to the new building, but also participated in a ceremony when departing the old building.

=== Move to the New Channel ===
In 1998, Tsymbal became one of the founding members and news presenters of the New Channel. Her move to the New Channel came as a surprise to many, especially given her primary new role, not in culture or news, but as an expert on local Kyiv issues and consumer goods. Despite the shift in focus, Tsymbal successfully adapted to the new format. However, New Channel had revived the interactive format of her former show Cinema Screen News (Novyny kinoekrana), but under different conditions. Her primary challenge was the newfound limited airtime, only ten minutes per episode, requiring her to deliver concise, information-rich content while maintaining politeness and professionalism, especially when needing to interrupt guests for time constraints. In her old formats, she had often entertained hour-long interviews that were edited down later.

Her invitation to join the New Channel came from then-director Oleksandr Tkachenko, who asked her to lead the segments Showcase and Important Guest. In an interview given to the Kyiv Daily News in 1999, Tsymbal explained that New Channel was implementing ideas she and her colleagues had proposed in the early 1990s: adapting to the decline of the traditional announcer role by introducing more dynamic formats that involved direct viewer engagement, timely responses, and more flexible content presentation. She told the Kyiv Daily News:

"Now? I am not tied to the microphone - it is hung on my suit. I have a connection with the apparatus in my ear - the director can guide me to some extent. If viewers call the studio, I hear their voices, I can communicate with them live. The only thing left is to see the faces of the interlocutors, but, I think, in a few years this problem will be solved. The distance between the presenter in the studio and the viewer has decreased enormously... These features of the "New Channel" also suggest the broadcasting style. Here, the presenters do not put a barrier between themselves and the viewer. What "Novy Kanal" does is exploration of the future of television."

Her involvement with the New Channel was not a complete departure from UT-1, however. Tsymbal continued to work in the Association of Film Programs on the National Channel, contributing to a segment titled Our Cinema, which she produced together with Tamara Medakova and Olena Zolotareva.

=== Return to UA:1 ===
In 2009, at the invitation of Vasyl Ilaschuk, Tsymbal returned to work at UA:1. In an interview given in 2009, Tsymbal said that she thought that this was not the same channel that she had once worked for. While many of the professionals who contributed to earlier phases of Ukrainian television remained involved in UT-1, the channel itself developed a new identity, different from its origins. The new format of UT-1 was a hybrid model, combining features of public service broadcasting with operational elements influenced by commercial television. Previously, editorial meetings known as "letters" provided a forum for exchanging critical feedback, aligning projects, and maintaining professional continuity. Although some of these practices had partially returned, the planning remained inconsistent, with staff often unaware of parallel efforts in other departments. This lack of communication occasionally led to redundancies—such as multiple programs covering the same topic, as happened in the case of a feature on writer Andriy Kurkov, which appeared in four separate programs in a short span of time.

=== Faith. Hope. Love ===
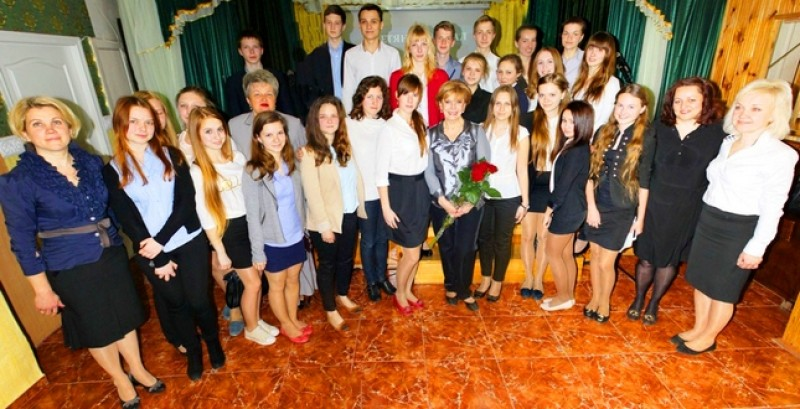
In 2014, Tatiana Tsymbal was invited to guest lecture a group of local teenagers at the "Dominant" educational complex (in Ukrainian: НВК «Домінанта») in Kyiv.

In 2010, Tsymbal created and began hosting the television program Faith. Hope. Love (Віра. Надія. Любов) on the public broadcasting station Suspilne. Faith. Hope. Love was a social talk show with a stated mission to provide assistance and emotional support o the public, especially in challenging life situations. Over time, under external advice and evolving broadcasting trends, the program was adapted to include discussions on social reforms, while still retaining its human-centered format. Despite its relevance and popularity, the program was eventually discontinued from airing on Suspilne. Regarding the reasons for its cancellation, she referred in an interview to the new management at Suspilne, noting that although the new leadership appeared young, active, and ambitious, structural reform alone does not automatically equate to genuine television development.

== 2022 evacuation to Canada, and return to Ukraine ==
On February 23, 2022, the night before the full-scale Russian invasion of Ukraine, she was working on the recording of a talk show at INTER, where one of the invited guests was Daria Kasyanova, the program director of the international humanitarian organization SOS Children’s Villages Ukraine. Tsymbal noticed Kasyanova’s unusual nervousness during the recording: she repeatedly stepped aside to answer or make phone calls. When Tsymbal inquired about the matter, Kasyanova responded: “We are taking children out of Mariupol.”

In the early hours of February 24, Tsymbal was abruptly awakened by a phone call from her son-in-law in Canada. Still half-asleep, she initially dismissed the call, insisting that everything was calm in Kyiv and that she simply wanted to rest. However, just moments later, the first explosions shook the city.

Tsymbal remained in Kyiv, and in the mass panic experienced blocked bridges, non-functional public transport, and severe shortages of food and fuel. Kyiv in those early weeks was described as eerily deserted, with explosions occasionally breaking the silence. She temporarily sheltered a woman and her daughter, refugees from Hostomel, who had been living in a pharmacy with their pet cat. Over time, these strangers became like family, and together they contributed to wartime support efforts, including cooking for territorial defense checkpoints.

Tsymbal eventually agreed to evacuate to Canada at the insistence of her daughter and son-in-law, who flew from Canada to accompany her and other relatives. The journey across Ukraine was only made possible by the generosity of strangers, including an overnight stay with a local in Vinnytsia, and refuge offered by a theater director in Ivano-Frankivsk. Once in Canada, Tsymbal joined volunteer initiatives supporting Ukraine, collecting humanitarian aid and organizing charity events. She also resumed her teaching duties at the National University of Life and Environmental Sciences, conducting online journalism classes. Tsymbal eventually did return to Kyiv.

== Personal life ==
Tsymbal has been married twice, and buried her second husband in 2021. Her daughter Olga is an amateur tennis player, who played for the Canadian national tennis team, and physical education teacher who lives in Canada and started a charity to raise funds for Ukrainian defense forces in 2022. Her son Peter, the lead guitarist for the rock band Green Grey, and his wife were arrested and jailed for nine years on marijuana possession and distribution charges.

=== Elder fraud impersonators ===
Tsymbal has had a problem with fake Facebook profiles being created in her name and running elder financial abuse scams on her friends, and also especially on viewers who used to watch her on television. Several such profiles have been taken down, but Tsymbal has complained to journalists that all she can do is issue takedown notices.

== See also ==
- Television in Ukraine
