= Stereo Plaza =

Music and event venue in Kyiv

- Стерео Плаза
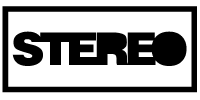
- Interactive map of Stereo Plaza
- Address: 119 Lobanovskyi Avenue, Holosiivskyi District, Kyiv
- Coordinates: 50.40837305825465°N 30.513121472017552°E
- Public transit: MAUP transit stop Ten minute walk from: Demiivska Metro; Kyiv Central Bus Station

Construction
- Opened: 2011

Website
- http://stereoplaza.com.ua/
- Media related to Stereo Plaza at Wikimedia Commons

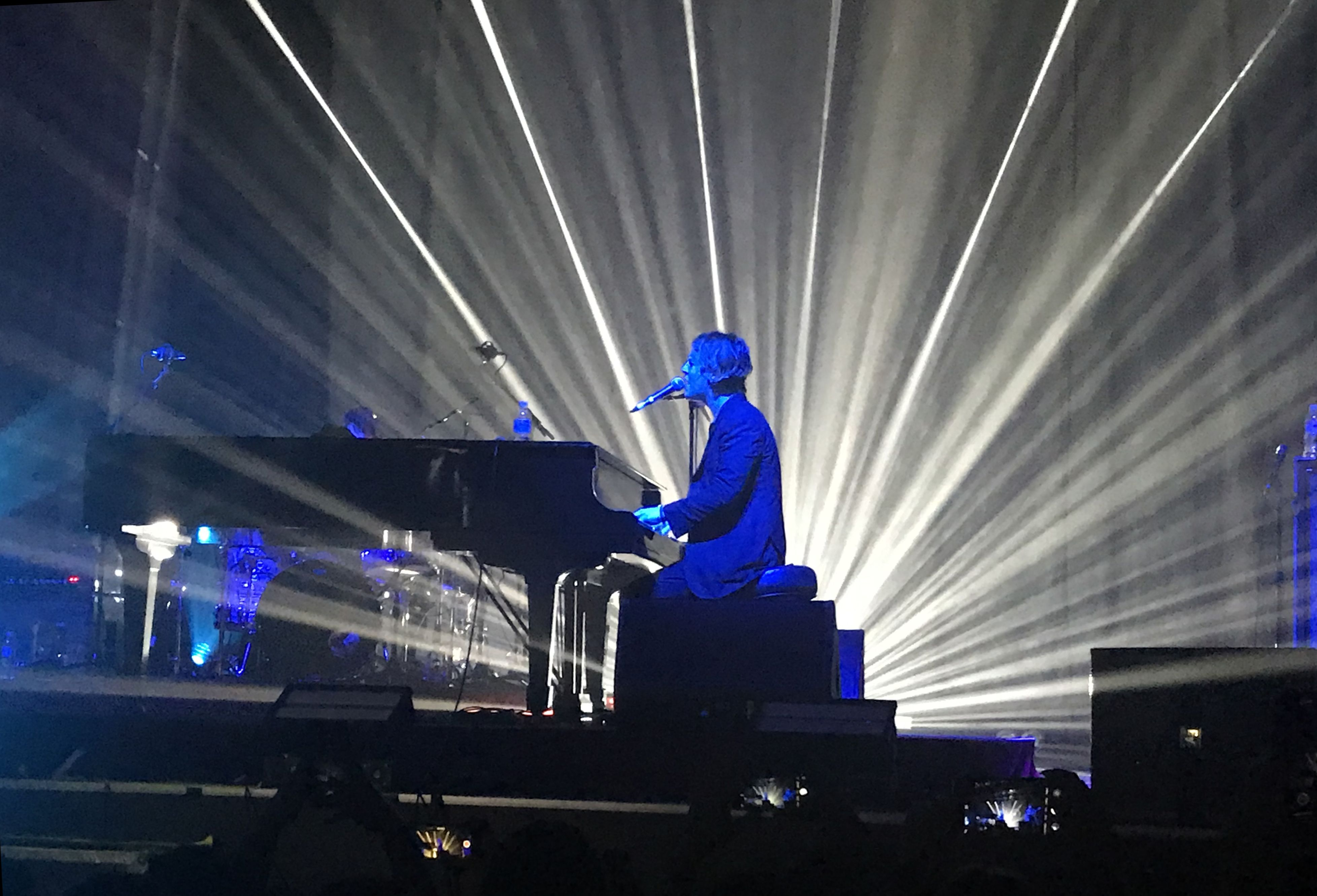
Concert of Tom Odell 5/02/2019 in Stereo Plaza

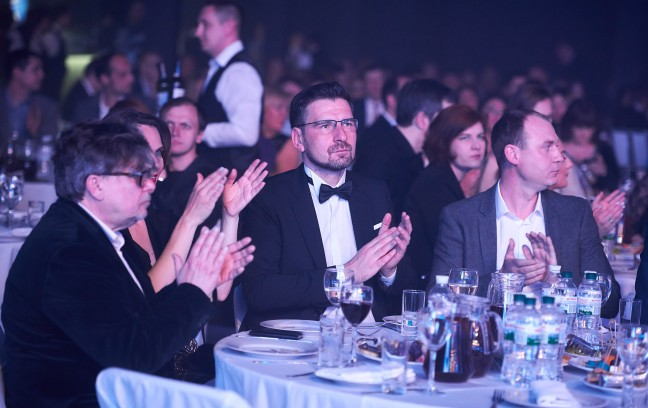
Vadym Karpyak and friends at Teletriumph 2018, which was held without a television broadcast at Stereo Plaza. The Teletriumphs are the national television awards of Ukraine.

Stereo Plaza is one of Ukraine's largest indoor music venues, accommodating up to 6,000 attendees across its three-tiered structure, encompassing a total area of 3,300 square meters, (approx. 35,521 square feet). The venue features a 16 by 8 meter stage, lighting and sound systems with a total acoustic output of 125 kW, and a multi-level layout. The ground floor includes the "fan zone" – an open-plan box-theatre style space for standing room or seating – while the second and third tiers contain designated VIP and "deluxe" areas, respectively, to accommodate different audience arrangements. The VIP area can accommodate more than 200 people, and has a separate entrance and wardrobe from the ground floor. Stereo Plaza has remained an active venue since Russia's full-scale invasion of Ukraine in February 2022. Despite the ongoing conflict, the venue has hosted numerous concerts and events, often with a focus on supporting Ukrainian resilience and culture.

== History ==
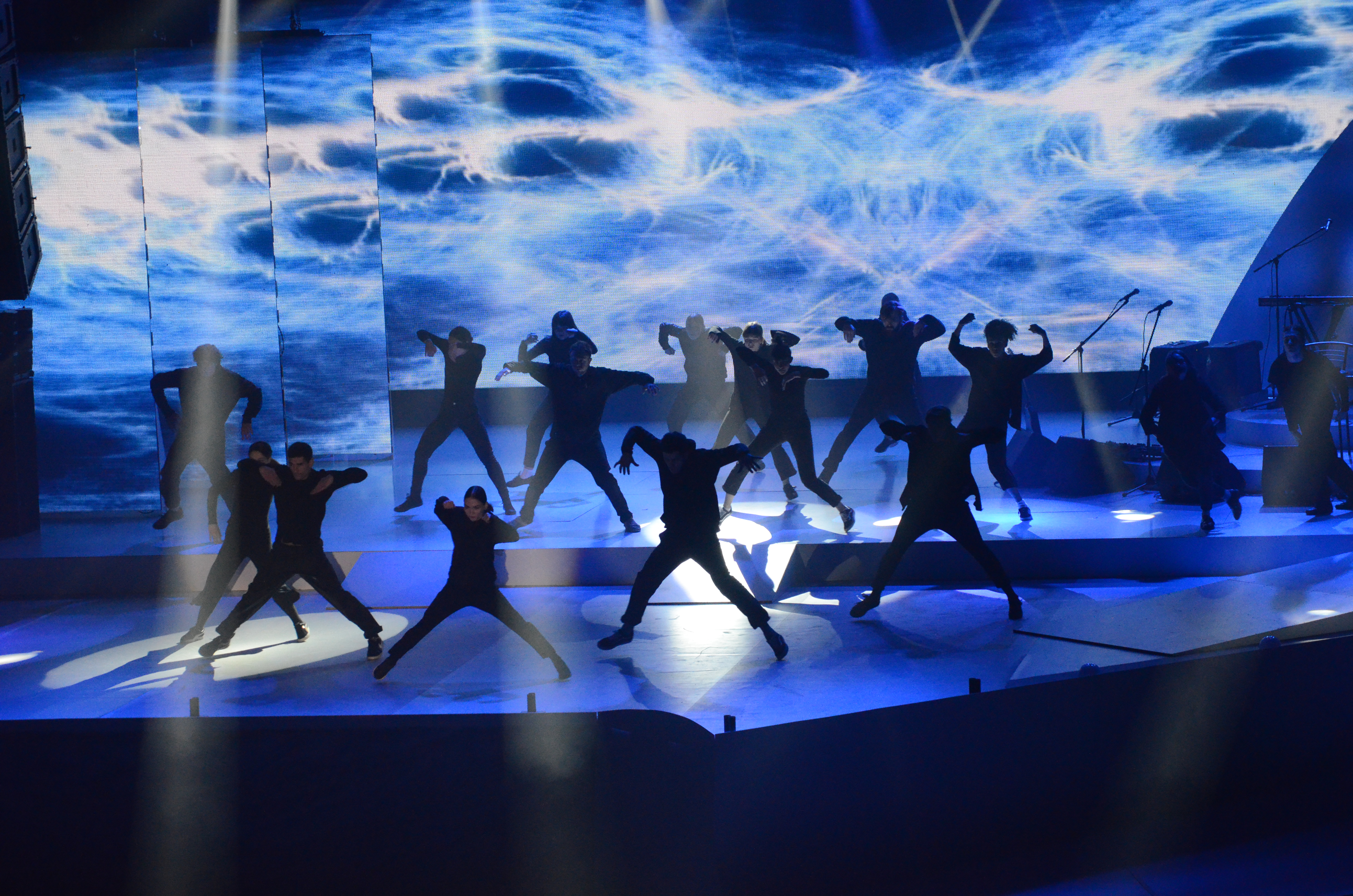
"Farewell ceremony" of the national Paralympic team of Ukraine prior to the XII Winter Paralympic Games, held at Stereo Plaza

Notable performances at Stereo Plaza have included those by The Rasmus, Tom Odell, Apocalyptica, Lil Pump, and Nothing But Thieves. In 2014, the venue was part of the Park Live Festival, showcasing acts like Die Antwoord, Deftones, Enter Shikari, and Wolfmother. More recently, Ukrainian acts such as LATEXFAUNA, Jerry Heil and alyona alyona, and Zhadan i Sobaky have performed here.

Shortly before the death of their lead singer Andriy Kuzmenko, the band Skryabin recorded a live concert album at Stereo Plaza called Дякую люди.

Stereo Plaza hosted the 2018 Teletriumph Awards, Ukraine's only national television awards ceremony.

In 2017, the band ONUKA performed their album MOZAIKA at Stereo Plaza.

In 2018, BRUTTO performed their third album ROKI at Stereo Plaza.

On June 26, 2021, fans of the rapper Basta got into a heated clash with Ukrainian activists outside of Stereo Plaza. The activists were protesting the fact that Basta had toured the region of Russian-occupied Crimea. Posters that the activists held included the phrases: "Basta supports the occupation of Crimea," "Basta finances the Russian army," and "Basta – Putin's six." "Six" here refers to the bottom of an analog clock, where someone's buttocks would appear anatomically.

=== After the 2022 invasion ===
On December 16, 2023, the Ukrainian rock band Bez Obmezhen performed at Stereo Plaza as part of their "Together to Victory" tour. This concert aimed to support Ukraine, featuring guest stars and a mix of popular hits and new songs. The band has been active in volunteering and has played many concerts in support of Ukraine and its Armed Forces since the war began.

On June 24, 2023, the band Druha Rika held a significant concert at Stereo Plaza, marking the 10-year anniversary of their album SUPERNATION. Part of the proceeds from this event were dedicated to supporting the Armed Forces of Ukraine.

On June 28, 2024, Ukrainian artists Jerry Heil and Alyona Alyona performed together at Stereo Plaza. Their concert featured joint tracks, including “Teresa & Maria,” a song created specifically for Eurovision 2024, as well as solo performances.

On November 24, 2024, the band Zhadan and the Dogs performed their album Radiochal at Stereo Plaza.

On March 20, 2024, champion boxer Nazri Rahimov knocked out Jorge Moya, winning the Ukrainian Welterweight WBC Silver Belt, at an event hosted by Top Boxing Generation and Balu Fighting League Pro. However, on September 28, 2024, Ukrainian underdog Andre Boryshpoleys defeated Rahimov at Stereo Plaza, winning the Ukrainian Pro Boxing League.

Stereo Plaza continues to schedule events.
