= Solomia Lukyanets =

Ukrainian opera singer (born 2001)

- Соломі́я Андрі́ївна Лук'яне́ць
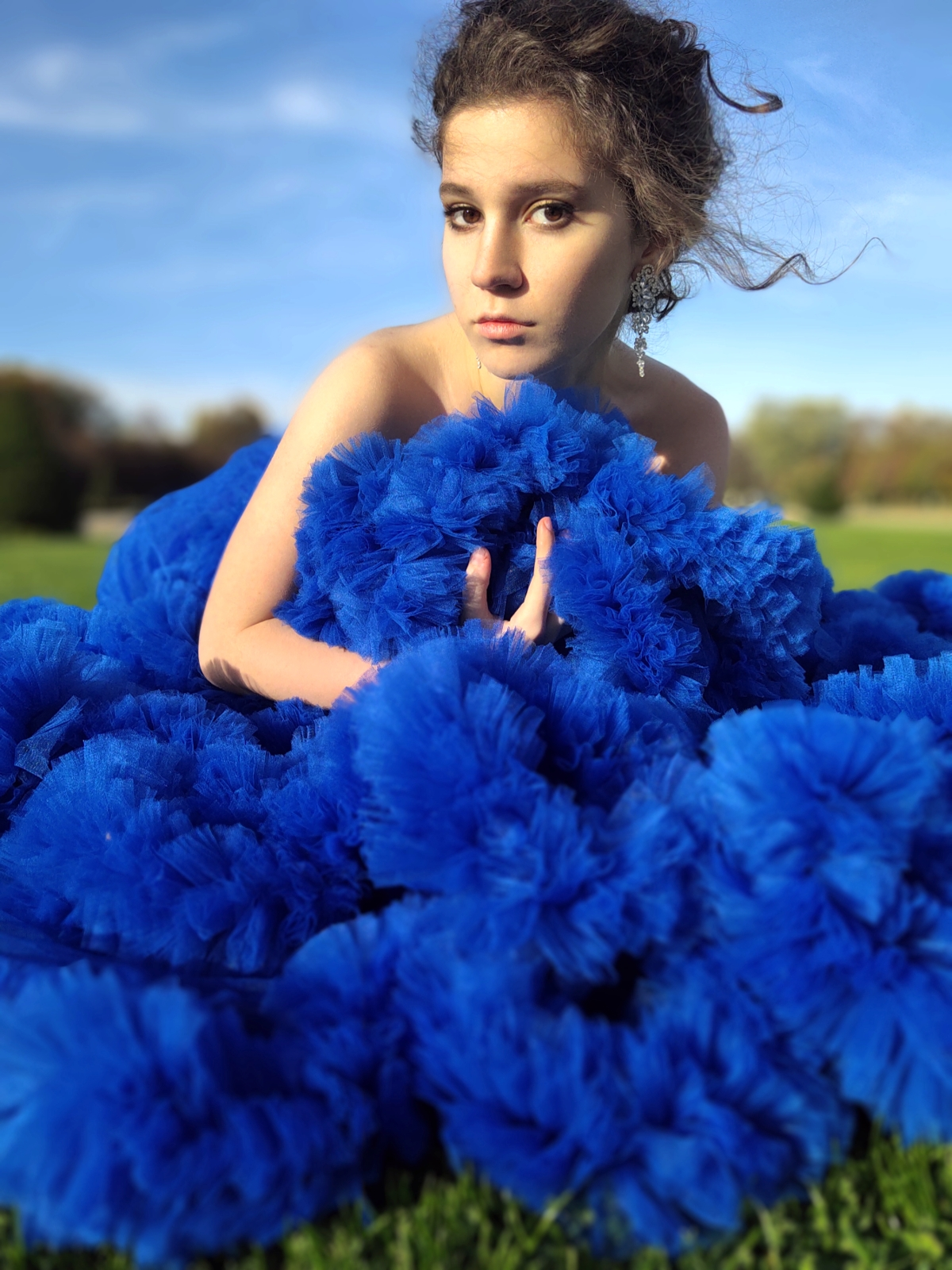
- Lukanyets in 2019
- Born: April 24, 2001 (age 25); Kyiv, Ukraine
- Education: Kyiv Lysenko State Music Lyceum
- Awards: Merited Artist of Ukraine; Pride of the Country; Triomphe de l'Art (Gran Prix); Bundeswettbewerb Gesang

Solomiya Andreevna Lukyanets is a Ukrainian operatic soprano whose vocal range could occupy three octaves by the age of fifteen. In 2017, she was enrolled in the National Register of Records of Ukraine and officially named the youngest professional opera singer in the entire country of Ukraine, although she had popularly held the title since the early 2000's. At ten years of age, she performed for the Teletriumph Awards, the national television awards of Ukraine.

She is a scholarship holder of the Leonid Kuchma Presidential Foundation. She was once called "the hope for Ukrainian opera". Lukyanets also performs pop, jazz, and folk music, in addition to the piano and the flute. In 2015, she informed journalists that she had no idols, and she was going to be the world's first Solomia Lukyanets. In 2017, however, she informed journalists that her primary inspirations were David Bowie, Lady Gaga, and Marilyn Manson.

== Early childhood music career ==
Lukyanets comes from a long heritage of musicians. Her aunt, Victoria Loukianetz, is an opera singer at the Vienna State Opera, who occasionally performs at La Scala, and the Metropolitan Opera. Her grandfather, Oleksandr Yevhenovych Blinov, who died in 2021, was the deputy concertmaster at the National Opera of Ukraine. Her great-grandfather, Evgeny Grigorovich Blinov, was also a famous music teacher and musician in Ukraine.

Lukyanets parents were both musicians trained by Oleksandr Bilnov. Lukyanets' father, Andriy Lukyanets, was a drummer and musician under the tutelage of Oleskandr Bilnov, which is where he met Lukyanets' mother.

Lukyanets began singing at the age of two, singing along to classical music that her mother would play for her on cassette tapes. Her mother, Olena Bilnov, a trained pianist and graduate of a conservatory, initially introduced her to classical music not with the aim of cultivating a performer, but to soothe her as an infant. However, Lukyanets' evident musical sensitivity soon encouraged her parents to pursue formal training. By age three, she was attending early childhood music education classes in Kyiv several times a week, despite the logistical challenges of commuting from the city's Troieshchyna district.

Her father also encouraged Lukyanets to become a singer, but was for much of her childhood under occasional contracts as a music instructor in Berlin. The family emphasized humility and balance in Lukyanets's upbringing; despite her achievements, she was encouraged by her parents to refrain from discussing her awards with school friends to avoid appearing boastful.

At the age of six, Lukyanets was awarded a scholarship from the Leonid Kuchma Presidential Foundation, a scholarship set up by the President of Ukraine, Leonid Kuchma, to help her cover travel and accommodation for creative competitions.

On April 9, 2008, Lukyanets performed for Kuchma on his 70th birthday party at Palace Ukraine. She was reportedly awestruck and speechless in his presence. When the President left, Lukyanets told her mother: "Mom, he's so young. I can't even believe that he's a president." When the President heard later what she had said about him, Kuchma laughed for a long time.

Before the age of ten, Lukyanets had won first place in multiple singing competitions in Ukraine, Russia, and Austria. Her prizes included both symbolic gifts, such as a teddy bear, and more substantial awards—most notably, a $1,000 prize at a St. Petersburg academic competition, which was used to purchase a piano and record a professional song. All the earnings from her contests were reinvested into her artistic development as a child. At one of her concerts, the opera singer Bruno Praticò reportedly stood and shouted "bravo!"

In 2009, she won first place in the "Children's New Wave" of 2009.

In 2010, Lukyanets was awarded the Ukrainian national Pride of the Country award by the Victor Pinchuk Foundation. After earning the award, she sat in the front center seat of the National Opera of Ukraine while serenaded by the Italian opera singer Alessandro Safina, who performed his song Luna. The awards were broadcast nationally by STB in partnership with the newspaper Fatky. Later that night, she returned to the stage to perform her own serenade for the artist Vera Remazhevska.

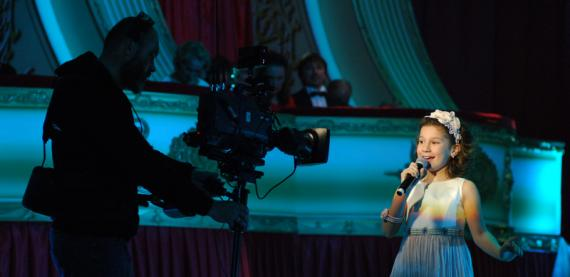
Lukyanets, then only 10 years old and the youngest professional opera singer in Ukraine, performs live at Teletriumph 2011.

By the age of ten, in 2011, her repertoire had grown to include classical arias from the works of renowned sopranos such as Maria Callas and Eugenia Miroshnichenko, as well as selections from pop and jazz. Her vocal style is often described as operatic, and her performances displayed an uncommon maturity for her age.

On August 24, 2011, Lukyanets represented Ukraine in a cultural event in Brussels marking the 20th Independence Day of Ukraine, an event which aimed to promote Ukrainian culture and featured a public ceremony, festivities in the historic city center, and participation by Ukrainian communities in Belgium. As part of the celebration, the city's landmark statue, Manneken Pis, was dressed in a costume representing Prince Yaroslav the Wise, a historical figure of Kievan Rus. Lukyanets was selected by the European Association of Ukrainians to symbolize Ukraine's young artistic talent abroad. Lukyanets' selection was symbolic of the ongoing efforts to highlight emerging Ukrainian figures on the international stage.

Early in 2013, when she was twelve years old, Lukyanets was mentored by Tina Karol and became a finalist in Holos Dity, the children's edition of Holos Krainy, The Voice of Ukraine. She was ultimately defeated in the final round by the 7 year old singer Anya Tkach, who earned a recording with Universal music and a trip to Disneyland.

When the Euromaidan erupted in 2013, Lukyanets went to the Maidan at Independence Square and attempted citizen journalism. She brought her video camera and filmed the protests from the ground. She wrote blog posts and filmed vlogs from the middle of the square, and put them on the internet. People from all over the world wrote to her and asked her questions. She later told reporters:

After all, many [of my fans] could not even understand from the news what was happening here. In the world, 87% of musicians are not interested in politics, they are engaged in their careers. Music is their politics.

== Teenage music career ==
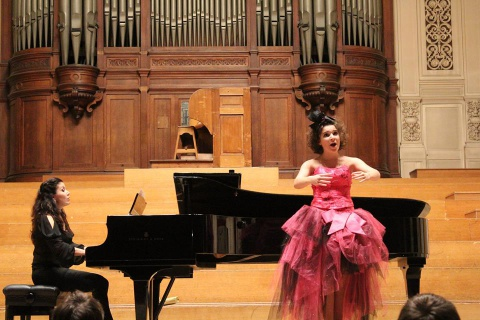
Lukyanets earns the 2016 Grand Prix from the Triomphe de l'Art Music Competition at the Royal Conservatory of Brussels.

In 2015, at thirteen years old, Lukyanets gained recognition in wider Europe when she performed a blind audition for The Voice Kids, the children's edition of The Voice of Germany, bringing one of the hosts to tears with her performance. She sang a song written in Italian and English, neither of which were her native tongue. The song was "Time to Say Goodbye (Con te partirò)" by Andrea Bocelli and Francesco Sartori. Her performance drew early interest from two of the show's coaches, Lena Meyer-Landrut and Johannes Strate, who turned their chairs during the audition. The third coach, Mark Forster, turned later in the performance. Lukyanets' choice of repertoire, as well as her command of the classical crossover style, was noted by the panel and the studio audience. Despite her initial success in the audition round, Lukyanets did not advance past the battle round stage of the competition.

In 2016, at 15 years old, Lukyanets gained international recognition when she participated in the Triomphe de l'Art Music Competition for Opera Singers at the Royal Conservatory of Brussels, where she was awarded the Grand Prix. She performed Alexander Alyabyev's The Nightingale and Vermenyich's Marigolds. The latter performance reportedly moved the all-female jury to tears, despite the fact that they did not understand the lyrics. The prize included €500, which she used to help cover the expenses of her week-long stay in Brussels.

In 2017, Lukyanets moved to Germany due to her mother's employment in Berlin, where her mother worked as a piano teacher. Lukyanets enrolled at the Johann Sebastian Bach Music Gymnasium in Berlin. There, she studied music with a focus on the flute, rather than voice, as the vocal department only admitted students aged 16 and older. Despite this, she began playing first flute in the school orchestra while still in 9th grade, earlier than the standard requirement of 10th grade.

In addition to her studies in Berlin, Lukyanets began composing her own music. Her first original song addressed the inner world of a teenager, combining elements of rock and classical music.

In October 2017, Lukyanets won the "Special Award for the Best Prominent Vocal Talent" and the "Audience Award" at the 5th Annual Giulio Perotti International Vocal Competition, in Ueckermünde, which was sponsored by Kiwanis.

== Adult music career ==
Lukyanets continues to perform in concerts.

In 2020, Lukyanets earned the Bundeswettbewerb Gesang Berlin award.

After the Russian invasion of Ukraine, on April 29, 2022, Lukyanets performed the National anthem of Ukraine alongside her mother, who played piano, and the tenor Stanislav Vypovskyi. On the video she posted of the performance to YouTube and her other social media accounts, she wrote:

My country is being destroyed. My country is being destroyed by [the] Russian army. Russian soldiers shoot on civilians, they rape Ukrainian women and looting Ukrainian people. It shows that they don't know what is honor and they are inhumane. That will have consequences and It will have its price. The whole world is seeing the truth. Ukraine will never forget.
