= Olha Herasymyuk =

Ukrainian journalist and TV presenter (born 1958)

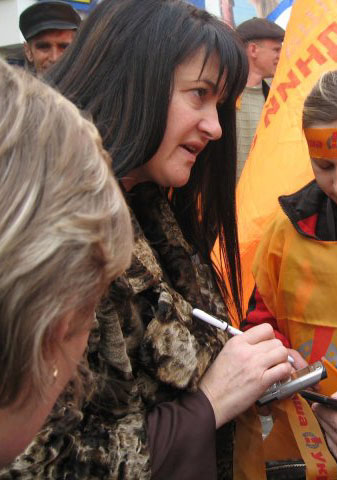
- Born: Olha Volodymyrivna Herasymyuk; October 21, 1958 (age 67); Pyriatyn, Soviet Union (now Ukraine)

Olha Volodymyrivna Herasymyuk (Ukrainian: Ольга Володимирівна Герасим'юк; born 21 October 1958) is a Ukrainian journalist and TV presenter.

== Biography ==
She graduated with honors from the Institute of Journalism at Taras Shevchenko National University of Kyiv. She also received a Masters of Foreign Policy from the Diplomatic Academy.

Seventeen years worked in the print press. Trained in the USA: USNews & WorldReport; GannettNewsService (Washington); Netherlands; Member of the Prize Jury Book of the Year Air Force.

In July 1995, she began working on television in the program "The Aftermath" (TC "Nova Language").

Since 1996 – the author and host of the TV channel "1+1", where she implemented "Against the Night" projects, "Special View", "Versions of Olha Herasymyuk", "I Want and Will," "Going to You," numerous special projects and one of the most popular talk shows in Ukraine "Without a taboo" that was kept on the screen for 10 years. Since 2020, he heads the National Council for Television and Radio Broadcasting, is engaged in cultural and social projects.

== Personal life ==
- Father – Volodymyr Mykhaylovych Prykhodko (1929–2006), a mechanic.
- Mother – Nina Dmytrivna (born 1931), teacher.
- Son – Ruslan, born 1982.

She is divorced and was married to the Ukrainian poet Vasyl Herasymyuk.

== Journalism ==
- 1976 – on the recommendation of the newspaper Komsomolsk banner, as the winner of the competition entered the faculty of journalism Kyiv State University. Shevchenko, who graduated with a red diploma 1981 p.
- 17 years worked in print press.
- June 1981 – August 1983 – correspondent of the newspaper Komsomolets Poltava Region.
- August 1983 – September 1990 – correspondent for the newspaper Komsomolskoye banner.
- September 1990 – December 1991 – editor of the department, the magazine Man and the World.
- January 1991 – May 1992 – Department Head, Komsomolskoye Znamia ("Independence").
- May 1992 – June 1994 – Deputy Editor-in-Chief, co-editor of the Republican weekly.
- June 1994 – June 1995 – editor of the department, information agency UNIAN.
- Trained as a journalist in United States, Netherlands, was a freelance correspondent for Air Forces.
- July 1995 – debut on television – journalist in the informational and analytical television program "Post-mortem" Oleksandr Tkachenko. Held a post of Head of the Department of Social Problems in the TV company "New Language".
- From 1997 р. – the lead author of the 1+1 channel, where she made "Against the Night" projects (1997 – April 1998) author of documentary special projects "Special View", "Versions of Olha Herasymyuk", talk show "Without a taboo" (from May 1998), "I want and I will", "I go to you".
- From July 2005 to April 2006 – general producer TRK Studio 1+1.
- Member of National Union of Journalists of Ukraine.
- July 4, 2014 year elected National Television and Radio Broadcasting Council.

== Lokhvitsky zemstvo school project under the project of Opanas Slastion ==
The Lokhvitsky zemstvo school project was created by public activists to save hundreds of unique schools in Poltava region which were built in Lokhvytskyi zemstvo in the early 20th century. The curator of the project is Olha Herasymyuk. She, together with other activists and architects, searches for the school of O. Slastion in the Poltava region and makes representations about assigning her architectural monuments.
