= Victoria Loukianetz =

Ukrainian operatic soprano

- Вікторія Лук'янець
- Born: 20 November 1966 (age 59); Kyiv, Ukrainian SSR, Soviet Union
- Occupation: Soprano

Victoria Ivanivna Loukianetz (Ukrainian: Вікторія Іванівна Лук'янець, formally transliterated as Viktoriya Lukyanets; born 20 November 1966) is a Ukrainian-born operatic soprano with an active career singing leading roles at the Vienna State Opera, La Scala, and other European opera houses. She has also appeared in leading roles at the Metropolitan Opera in New York City.

She was born in Kyiv and graduated in solo singing from the R. Glier Kyiv Institute. At the Vienna State Opera she has specialised in bel canto roles including leading soprano roles in Linda di Chamounix, I puritani, La traviata, Rigoletto, L'elisir d'amore, The Barber of Seville, and The Magic Flute.

== Dates ==
- 1989 – became a soloist of the National Opera of Ukraine.
- 1994 – became a soloist of the Vienna State Opera
- December 1995 – made her house debut at La Scala
- 1999 – was awarded the title of "Person of the Year" in the nomination of «Culture and Art».
- 2001 – was awarded the title of People's Artist of Ukraine.
