= National Council of Television and Radio Broadcasting of Ukraine =

- Національна рада України з питань телебачення і радіомовлення

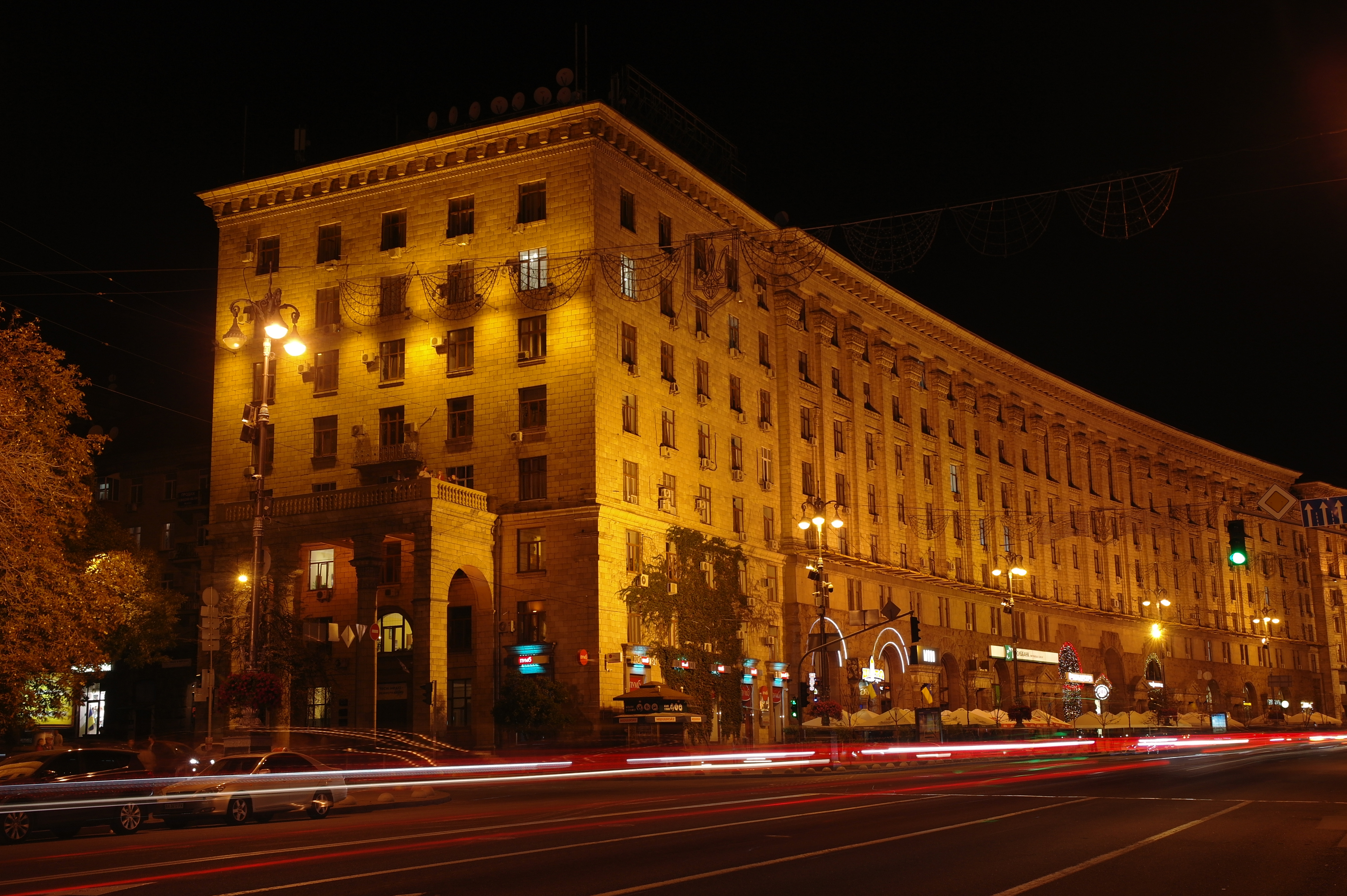
- NRADA Headquarters

Agency overview
- Formed: 21 December 1993; 32 years ago
- Headquarters: 2 Prorizna Street, Kyiv, Ukraine
- Agency executive: Olha Herasymyuk
- Parent department: Verkhovna Rada
- Key document: https://zakon.rada.gov.ua/laws/show/2849-20
- Website: https://webportal.nrada.gov.ua/

The National Council of Television and Radio Broadcasting (NRADA) is a constitutional, permanent, collegial regulatory authority tasked with overseeing compliance with Ukrainian law in the fields of television and radio broadcasting. The body is composed of eight members: half are appointed by the Verkhovna Rada (the national parliament), and the other half by the President of Ukraine. Each member serves a five-year term starting from the date of appointment. A person may be reappointed only once.

== Regulatory powers ==
The regulatory powers exercised by the National Council in the field of television and radio broadcasting include:

- Licensing of television and radio broadcasting
- Participation in the development and approval of the draft National Table of Radio Frequency Bands of Ukraine and the Plan for the use of radio frequency resource of Ukraine in terms of radio frequency bands allocated for the needs of television and radio broadcasting
- Development of conditions for the use and identification of users of the radio frequency resource allocated for the needs of television and radio broadcasting
- Ensuring and promoting competition in the activities of television and radio organizations of all forms of ownership in accordance with the requirements of the legislation, creating conditions for preventing the elimination, restriction or distortion of competition in the television and radio information space
- Maintaining the State Register of Television and Radio Organizations of Ukraine

== Supervisory powers ==
Supervisory powers of the National Council include:

- Licensees' compliance with the requirements of the legislation of Ukraine in the field of television and radio broadcasting
- Licensees' compliance with the requirements of the legislation of Ukraine on advertising and sponsorship in the field of television and radio broadcasting
- Licensees' compliance with license conditions and terms of licenses
- Compliance of licensees with the procedure established by law during election campaigns and referendums
- Compliance with standards and norms of technical quality of television and radio programs
- Observance by television and radio organizations of the legislation of Ukraine in the field of cinematography
