= Igor Kondratyuk =

Ukrainian television presenter

Ihor Kondratyuk
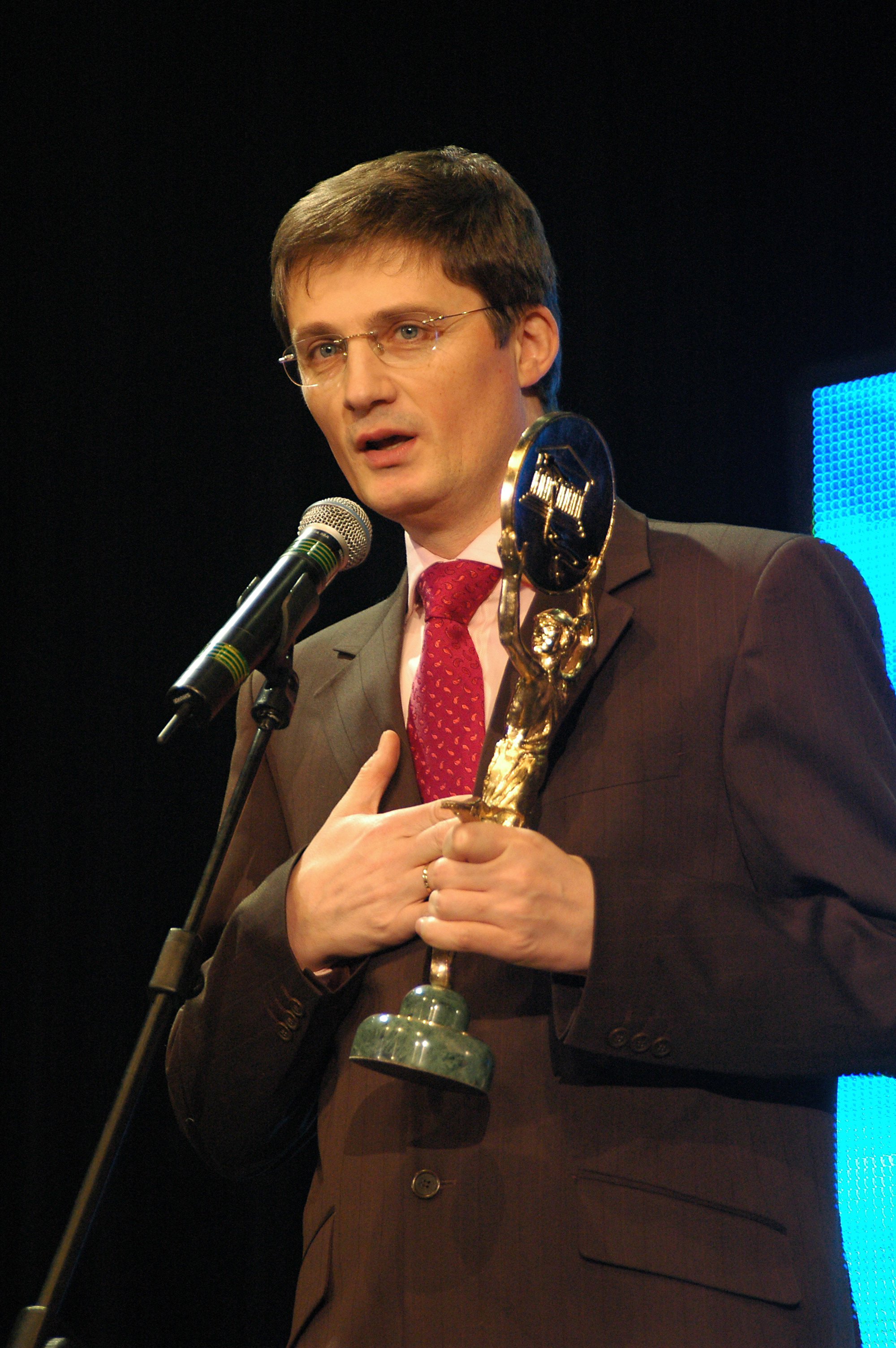
- Born: March 14, 1962 (age 64); Pryhiria, Vysokopillia Raion, Kherson Oblast, Ukraine
- Citizenship: Ukraine
- Education: Faculty of Physics, Taras Shevchenko National University of Kyiv
- Occupations: Television host; Television producer; Showman
- Known for: Host and producer of Karaoke on the Maidan, judge on Ukraine's Got Talent and X-Factor
- Spouse: Oleksandra Horodetska
- Children: Serhiy, Danylo, Polina
- Awards: Crystal Owl (What? Where? When?); Six Teletriumf awards; Favorites of Success – Show Program Host of the Year (2005); Shield of Territorial Defense (2022)
- Website: web.archive.org/web/20170329182500/http://igorkondratjuk.com/

Ihor Vasyliovych Kondratyuk (born March 14, 1962) is a Ukrainian television host, television producer, and showman.

== Biography ==
Ihor Kondratyuk was born on March 14, 1962, in the village of Pryhiria, Vysokopillia Raion, Kherson Oblast, Ukraine. In 1979, he graduated with a gold medal from Kalanchak Secondary School No. 1 and lived in Zahradivka. In 1984, he graduated from the Faculty of Physics at Taras Shevchenko National University of Kyiv, specializing in solid-state optics. After university, he worked as a research associate in the Molecular Biophysics Department at the Institute of Molecular Biology and Genetics of the National Academy of Sciences of Ukraine.

In 1996, he defended his candidate's dissertation in molecular biology, titled "Investigation of the Physicochemical Nature of Elementary Processes of Molecular Recognition Using NMR, Vibrational Spectroscopy, and Computer Modeling."

Since 1985, Kondratyuk has been a member of the What? Where? When? club. He began working in television in 1991, serving as an editor, showman for audience engagement, and assistant host for the programs Love at First Sight and Brain Ring on the Ostankino channel in Moscow. He later co-organized and hosted What? Where? When? and Brain Ring matches featuring celebrities from Ukraine, Belarus, and Russia on UT-1.

- From 1992 to 1994, he hosted the game show 5+1 on UT-3, and from 1995 to 1996, the game show Tomorrow's TV Schedule on UT-1.
- From 1997 to 2000, he was a co-creator and host of the program Toys for the Street on Moscow's Channel 31.
- Since 1999, he has been a co-creator (with Andriy Kozlov), producer, and host of Karaoke on the Maidan on channels Inter, 1+1, and STB. In 2006, he hosted Karaoke on Arbat on TV Tsentr in Moscow.
- From 2001 to 2006, he was the host and chief editor of the intellectual show LG Eureka! on Inter.
- From 2003 to 2008, he was the producer and co-creator of the television project Shans.
- In 2006, he produced the projects Star Duet and Teen Ring on Inter.
- In 2007, he was the creator and producer of American Shans on 1+1, filmed in Los Angeles, United States.
- In 2007, Kondratyuk left Inter following a scandal when Karaoke on the Maidan aired a repeat episode on July 15, 2007, for the first time in its eight-year history (the 446th episode from Kharkiv aired instead of the 447th, filmed in Dnipro). He believed the channel's management, unwilling to renew his contract for Shans and Karaoke on the Maidan, made the decision. After negotiations with Inter's management (Hanna Bezludna and Serhiy Sozanovsky), new episodes aired until July 29, and from August 5, Karaoke on the Maidan moved to 1+1. In an interview with Gordon Boulevard, Kondratyuk described the breaking point:
  For two months, they assured me: don’t worry, everything will be fine with your projects, we’ll sign the papers, no problem! But the moment I stepped out of Inter’s office, they forgot about me like an annoying fly that finally buzzes off. Meanwhile, management kept reminding me: ‘These people need to be removed from the show, these moments need reworking, and we don’t need this at all.’ For the 155th time, I explained why I couldn’t agree to their changes. That’s how it went: on one hand, they didn’t say anything outright; on the other, they did everything to make me leave voluntarily.
  He remarked that discussing professional matters with Hanna Bezludna was like discussing advanced mathematics with his first-grade son.
- In spring 2009, he became a judge on Ukraine's Got Talent on STB, alongside Vlad Yama and Slava Frolova.
- From September 2010 to December 2015, he was a judge on STB's vocal talent show X-Factor. He was the only Ukrainian judge to guide contestants to the superfinal in five out of six seasons: Maria Rak (Season 1), Oleh Kenzov (Season 2), Yevhen Lytvynkovych (Season 3), Aida Nikolaychuk (Season 3), Trioda (Season 4), and Kostya Bocharov (Season 6). Aida Nikolaychuk and Kostya Bocharov won X-Factor, both hailing from Odesa. He returned for the 10th season, mentoring the "Girls" category, and led his contestant Elina Ivashchenko to victory, marking his third win as a mentor. Only Simon Cowell, creator of the X-Factor franchise, has mentored more winners (four times in the UK and US).
- From September 21, 2020, to July 25, 2021, he hosted the author's evening show Kondratyuk on Monday on Channel 5.

From February to April 2022, he evacuated from Kyiv and lived with his wife in Lviv. On March 14, 2022, Russian forces shelled his house near Kyiv.

== Career highlights ==
Karaoke on the Maidan has aired every Sunday since January 17, 1999, making it the longest-running show on Ukrainian television, with over 1,000 episodes filmed in 70 cities and villages across Ukraine and abroad.

Kondratyuk is the only Ukrainian television host to have hosted the same program in different countries in two languages: Karaoke on the Maidan in Ukraine (Ukrainian) and Karaoke on Arbat in Russia (Russian).

Between 2004 and 2012, he produced winners of the Shans project, including Vitaliy Kozlovsky (five albums: Cold Night (2005), Unraveled Dreams (2006), Beauty-Separation (2007), Only Love (2009), 20 UA (2011)), Natalia Valevska (albums Let Go (2006), Without You (2007)), Pavlo Tabakov (album Only You Are Mine (2007)), Oleksandr Voyevutsky, Olesya Kyrychuk, and Inna Voronova. He co-produced (with Yuriy Nikitin) the debut album of the band Aviator, On Air (2005).

In 2012, he ended his professional relationship with Vitaliy Kozlovsky. According to Muzvar, this was one of the top five most notable splits in Ukraine's music industry.

=== Awards ===
- Crystal Owl, What? Where? When? television club (Moscow).
- Six Teletriumf awards, including:
- Karaoke on the Maidan – Best Game Show (2003), Best Music Program (2008)
- Eureka! – Best Children's Program (2003)
- Shans – Best Game Show (2004), Best Entertainment Program (2006), Best Music Program (2007)
- Winner of the international Favorites of Success contest – Show Program Host of the Year (2005).
- Shield of Territorial Defense, awarded by Major General Ihor Tantsiura, Commander of the Territorial Defense Forces of the Ukrainian Armed Forces, for supporting territorial defense (2022).

== Personal life ==
Kondratyuk is married to Oleksandra Horodetska and has three children: sons Serhiy and Danylo, and daughter Polina.
