= Karaoke on the Maidan =

Ukrainian television show (1999–2019)

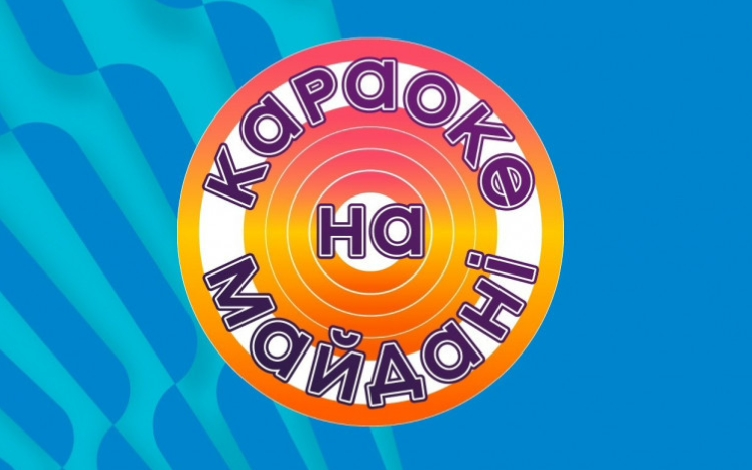
- Genre: Music television Talent show
- Created by: Ihor Kondratiuk; Andrey Kozlov
- Based on: Karaoke na Arbate
- Presented by: Ihor Kondratiuk
- Country of origin: Ukraine
- Original languages: Ukrainian; Russian; English with Ukrainian (CBS)
- No. of episodes: 1043

Production
- Production locations: Kyiv Passage, Maidan Nezalezhnosti
- Production company: Prime Time

Original release
- Network: Inter (1999–2007); 1+1 (2007–2009); STB (2009–2019); CBS (2008–2010); TET (2026-present)
- Release: January 17, 1999 – January 20, 2019; May 10, 2026 (comeback)

Related
- Chance; American Chance

Karaoke on the Maidan (Ukrainian: Караоке на Майдані, lit. Karaoke on the Square) was a Ukrainian music programme and television talent show created by Ihor Kondratiuk and Andrey Kozlov. During its runtime between 1999 and 2019, Karaoke on the Maidan was a popular television programme in Ukraine, scoring well in the ratings. Its former list of finalists and winners include Tina Karol, Max Barskih, Vitalii Kozlovskyi, Natalia Valevska, Oleksandr Skichko and Taras Topolia.

After shooting for over twenty years and producing more than a thousand episodes, creator and presenter Ihor Kondratiuk pulled the plug of the show in late 2018. The source of the cancellation was an ending contract with then broadcaster STB. Meanwhile, Kondratiuk felt that the programme had outlived itself and had become old-fashioned.

== History ==
The idea for Karaoke on the Maidan was developed by Ihor Kondratiuk and Andrey Kozlov, who were both participants of the Russian television game What? Where? When?. The idea was initially developed for the Moscow regional television station 31st channel. There, it aired as Karaoke on the Arbat.

In 1999, the idea was brought to Ukraine where it was branded as Karaoke on the Maidan, being primarily shot on the Maidan Nezalezhnosti, just past the Kyiv Passage. The song's theme initially was Mikhail Shufutinsky's song "Khreshchatyk", a reference to the Khreshchatyk, on which the programme was shot. Although the first broadcasts just totally for about 20 minutes, the programme was later stretched to an hour.

Between 2001 and 2002, television station Ukraine aired the programme Karaoke near the Fountain, which was analogue to the Karaoke on the Maidan format shot in Donetsk. In 2002, Kondratiuk, Kozlov and their production company Prime Time started a lawsuit against the television station clamming copyright infringement. The initial lawsuit was lost by Kondratiuk and his production company, but after an appeal, the court agreed that copyright had been violated.

TV channel 1+1 bought the right to broadcast it on air in 2007. In 2008, CBS earned the right to produce and broadcast the programme until the show's cancellation on January 21, 2010. In 2009, STB earned the right to produce and broadcast the programme until the show's cancellation in early 2019.

=== 2026: The revival of transmissioned ===
In 2026, the TET TV channel announced the revival of the television project "Karaoke on the Square". The updated format combines entertainment with a social mission and charity.

The decision to revive the project was made after charity events in this format were held, during which funds were raised. The main goal is to support the Ukrainian military, in particular veterans undergoing treatment and rehabilitation at the Titanovi center. The funds raised are directed to their support.

The author and host of the previous seasons, Igor Kondratyuk, acts as a creative producer in the renewed project. Khas became the host of the updated version.

Filming is taking place in Kyiv, specifically on Kontraktova Square, which is different from the previous main location, Khreshchatyk. The premiere is scheduled for May 10, 2026 on the TET TV channel.

== Format ==
During its twenty years on air, the format Karaoke on the Maidan stayed almost identical.

- a crowd of people is gathered on the street and everyone is a potential participant of the game;
- the presenter, Ihor Kondratiuk, starts to sing a song together with the crowd;
- Kondratiuk chooses at his discretion those people who were singing that song better than others for the further game;
- the contestants are allowed to sing a song of their choice;
- among the contestants, the crowd has to elect the ones who will take part in the final episode of the program;
- the finalists are gathering money in the crowd to find out who is the winner;
- the one who has gathered more money is the winner of the episode.

== Spin-offs ==
=== Chance (2003–2008) ===
Alongside Karaoke on the Maidan, Ihor Kondratiuk created the spin-off Chance with Andriy Kuzmenko and Natalia Mohylevska as presenters, starting in 2003 and ending in 2008. The participants of Chance were young singers and music enthusiasts who had to prepare a TV performance within the space of one day. They were helped to prepare their performance with professional hair dressers, make-up artists and producers. The programme ran until 2008, when its function was replaced by new television formats on Ukrainian television. Around 90% of the participants on Chance had previously appeared on Karaoke on the Maidan.
