= Maidan Nezalezhnosti =

Central Square in Kyiv, Ukraine

Maidan Nezalezhnosti Майдан Незалежності
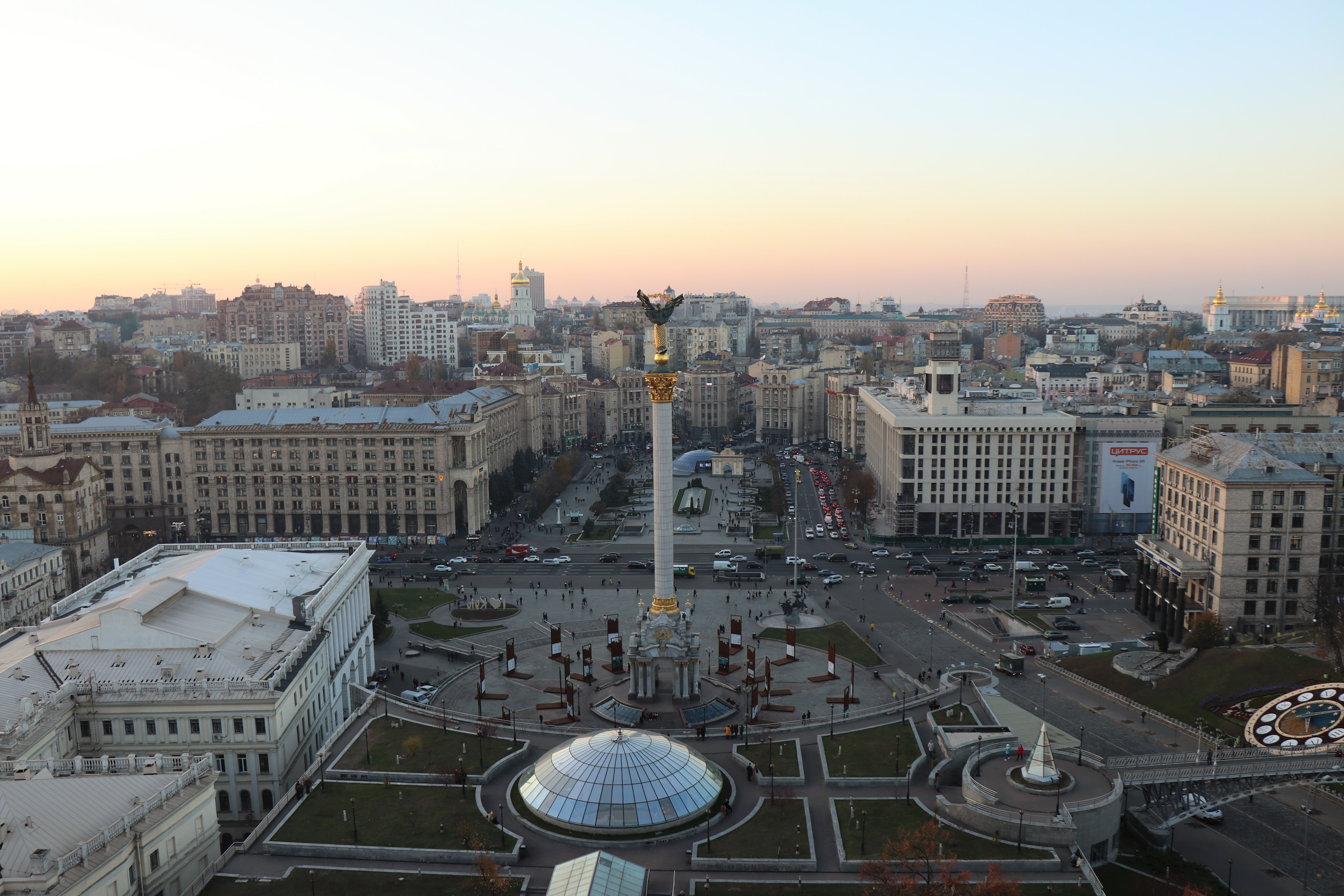
- General view of the square in 2018

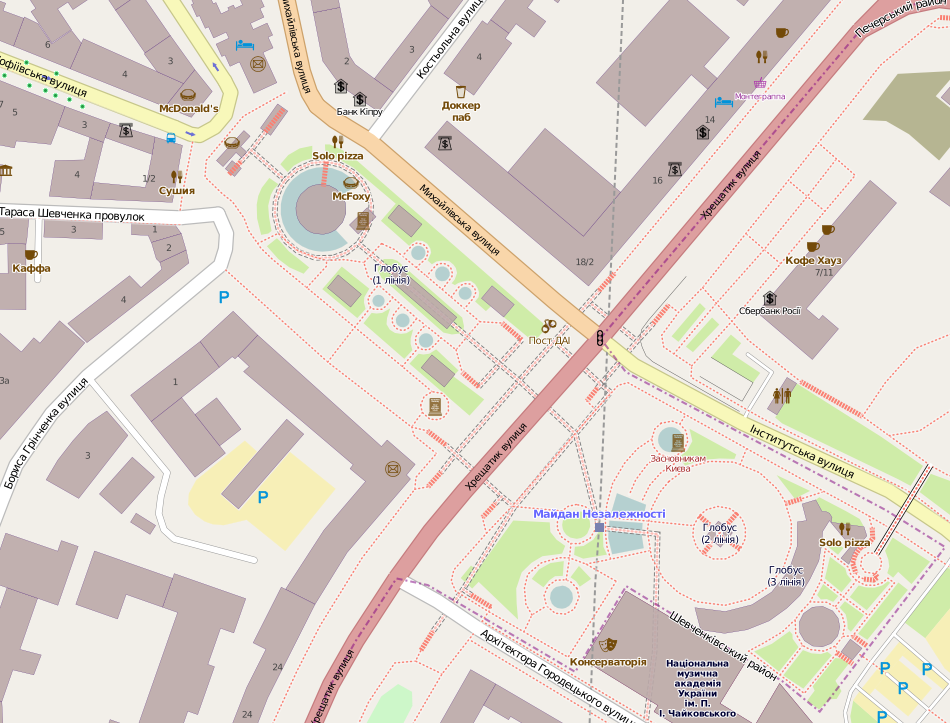
- Location within Kyiv
- Location: Kyiv, Ukraine
- Coordinates: 50°27′0″N 30°31′27″E

Maidan Nezalezhnosti (Ukrainian: Майдан Незалежності, Ukrainian pronunciation: [mɐjˈdɑn nezɐˈlɛʒnos⁽ʲ⁾t⁽ʲ⁾i]), translated as Independence Square, is the central town square of Kyiv, the capital city of Ukraine. One of the city's main squares, it is located on Khreshchatyk Street in the Shevchenko Raion. The square contains the iconic Independence Monument.

In the 19th century, the square contained buildings of the city council and noble assembly.

Since the start of Ukraine's independence movement in 1990, the square has been the traditional place for political rallies, including four large-scale radical protest campaigns: the 1990 student Revolution on Granite, the 2001 Ukraine without Kuchma campaign, the 2004 Orange Revolution and the 2013–14 Euromaidan. Maidan is also a regular site for non-political displays and events; however, since 2014, most of them were moved to Sofiyivska Square or elsewhere, because making entertainment on a place where people were killed during Euromaidan was considered inappropriate. Most notably, Christmas Fairs and New Year celebrations were moved to Sofiyivska Square. In addition, since the Russian invasion of Ukraine, the square also hosts a makeshift memorial commemorating those killed in the conflict.

== Names ==
The square received its current name on 26 August 1991, two days after the Declaration of Independence of Ukraine, during the collapse of the Soviet Union.

Maidan is a Ukrainian word for 'square, open space', with widely used equivalents in the Middle East and South Asia to refer to an open space in or near a town, used as a parade ground or for events such as public meetings. It comes from Persian میدان (meydân; 'town-square' or 'central place of gathering'), itself deriving from Proto-Iranian, ultimately from Proto-Indo-European *médʰyos. Compare Avestan maiδya, Sanskrit मध्य (madhya) and Latin medius. The word also was borrowed into neighboring Turkic languages, as in the Crimean Tatar, Gagauz and Turkish meydan, which are the likely sources of the borrowing into Ukrainian.

Maidan Nezalezhnosti is the only square in Kyiv officially designated as a "Maidan" (майдан) in the Ukrainian language; the same applies to Russian. All other Kyivan squares remain designated as a "Ploshcha" (площа – the native and more common Ukrainian word for 'square' – as was used during Soviet rule.

Timeline of the square's names:

- 1869: Khreshchatyk Square (Хрещатицька площа)
- 1876: Duma Square (Думська площа)
- 1919: Soviet Square (Радянська площа)
- 1935: Kalinin Square (Площа Калініна)
- 1941: Duma Square (Думська площа)
- 1943: Kalinin Square (Площа Калініна)
- 1977: Square of the October Revolution (Площа Жовтневої революції)
- Since 1991: Independence Square (Майдан Незалежності)

City squares called Maidan Nezalezhnosti are also found in Khmelnytskyi and Sumy. Kropyvnytskyi, Kremenchuk and Odesa have "Independence Squares" named Ploshcha Nezalezhnosti (using ploshcha rather than maidan for "square").

== Location ==
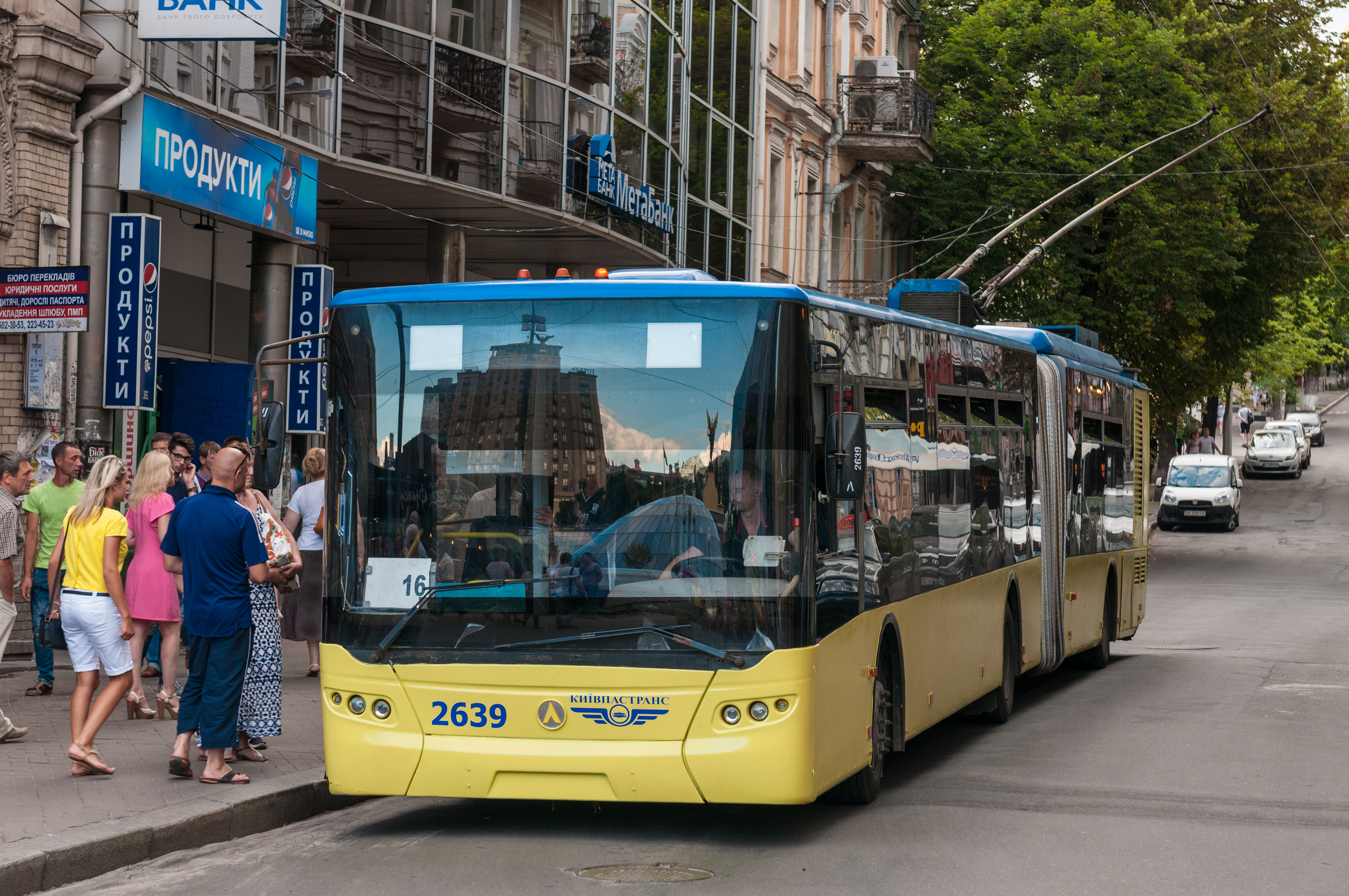
A trolleybus stop in Maidan Nezalezhnosti

Independence Square is one of three squares located along Khreshchatyk, close to the northeastern end of the street. It is situated close to European Square, which is the terminal end of Khreshchatyk. Besides Khreshchatyk, which splits the square in half, several other streets lead to the square. These include Arkhitektora Horodetskoho, Instytutska, Mykhailivska, Kostiolna, Mala Zhytomyrska, Sofiyska and Borysa Hrinchenka streets, as well as Tarasa Shevchenka Lane.

The square itself is a multi-level location. At ground level is the intersection of Khreshchatyk, which splits Institute Street (vulytsia Instytutska), and Michael Street (vulytsia Mykhailivska). Underneath the square, the Obolonsko–Teremkivska line of the Kyiv Metro stretches across with its station Maidan Nezalezhnosti located underground. Also the "Hlobus" mall is situated underneath the square.

== History ==
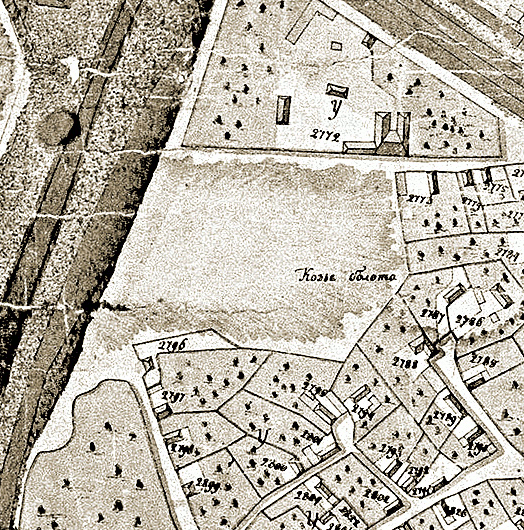
Modern area of the square marked as "Goat Swamp" on a 1803 map by Andrey Melensky

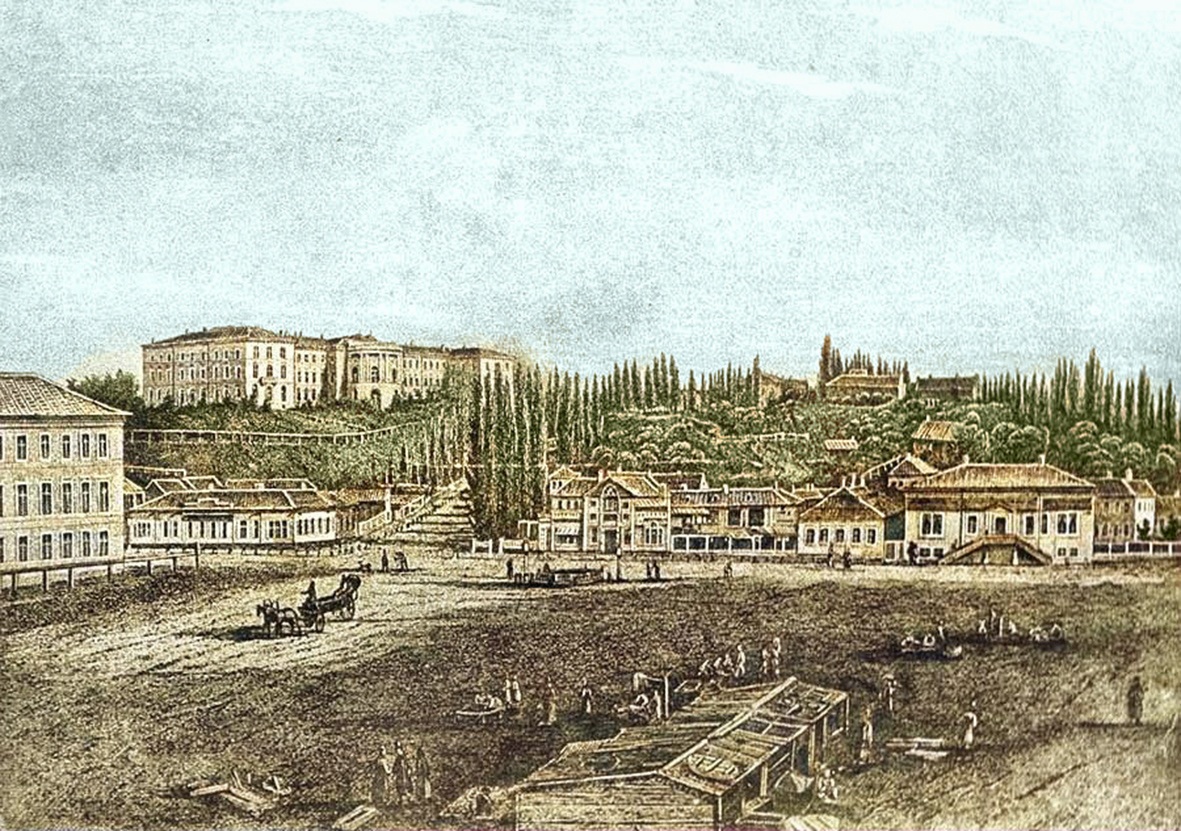
Khreshchatyk Square during the 1850s

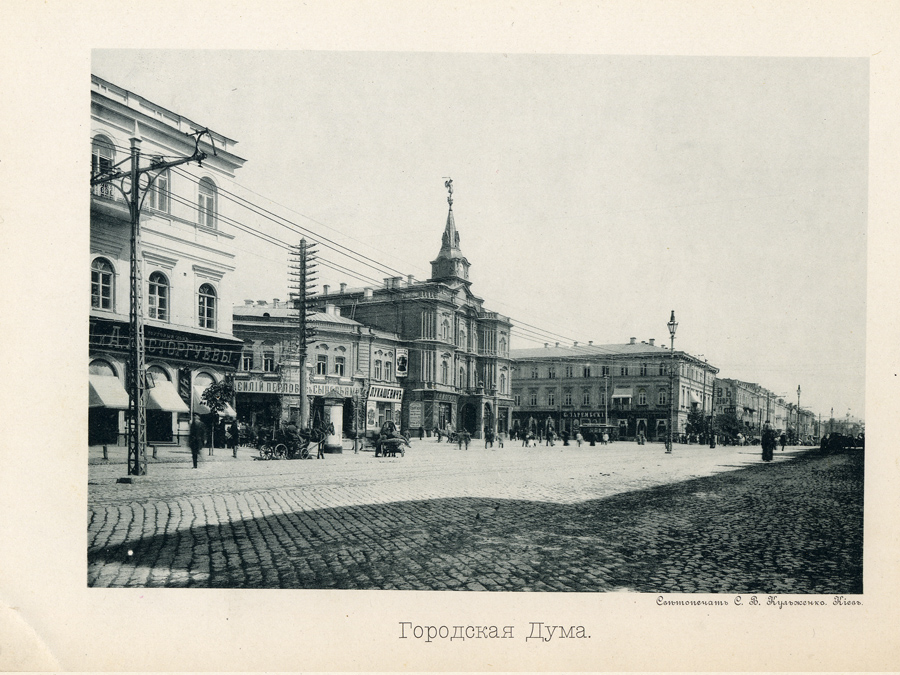
An early 20th-century Russian postcard depicting the Dumskaya, as the square was then called. The Kyiv City Duma is seen in the centre.

=== Early history ===
Until the 10th century, the future square's site, as well as the rest of Khreshchatyk, was called Perevisyshche. It was located just to the south of the Kyiv City, beyond which were located territories of the Cave Monastery (Kyiv-Pechersky) along the Dnipro River.

At the lower end of Sofiivska vulytsia (Sofia Street), which led to the High City, stood one of the three main gates of Old Kyiv (Yaroslav's City), the Lyadski Gates; the other two were the Golden Gates and Zhydivski Gates. Those gates are also mentioned in 1151, and around them lived the Polish population of the city, Lacka Sloboda. The Lyadski Gates were destroyed during the storm of city by the Mongol army of Batu Khan in 1240.

Sometime during the 18th century, the new Pecherski Gates were erected; they stood until 1833. Until the early 19th century, the area was a low-lying vacant ground known as Goat Swamp (Kozyne Boloto).

In the 1830s, the first wooden dwellings were built on the site, and in the 1850s stone buildings appeared. The most famous Ukrainian writer, Taras Shevchenko lived in that area in 1859, in a building between Mala Zhytomyrska (Little Zhytomyr) and Mykhailivska vulytsia (Michael's Street).

Development rapidly intensified after the mid-19th century, when the territory gradually became the commercial center of Kyiv, which underwent an immense boom during the Russian Industrial Revolution, becoming the third most important city in the Russian Empire. Until 1871, it was called the Khreshchatitskaya Ploshchad (Khreshchatyk Square); it was a location for the local market and folk entertainment. In 1876, the Kyiv City Duma building was built here, and the area became known as the Dumskaya Ploshchad (Duma Square). A line from the Kyiv tram, the first electric tram built in the Russian Empire (opened 1892) reached the square in 1894.

In 1913, in front of the City Duma, a monument of Pyotr Stolypin (who was assassinated in Kyiv in 1911) was constructed, and it stood there until March 1917 at the dawn of the Revolutionary war within the Empire.

=== Soviet period ===
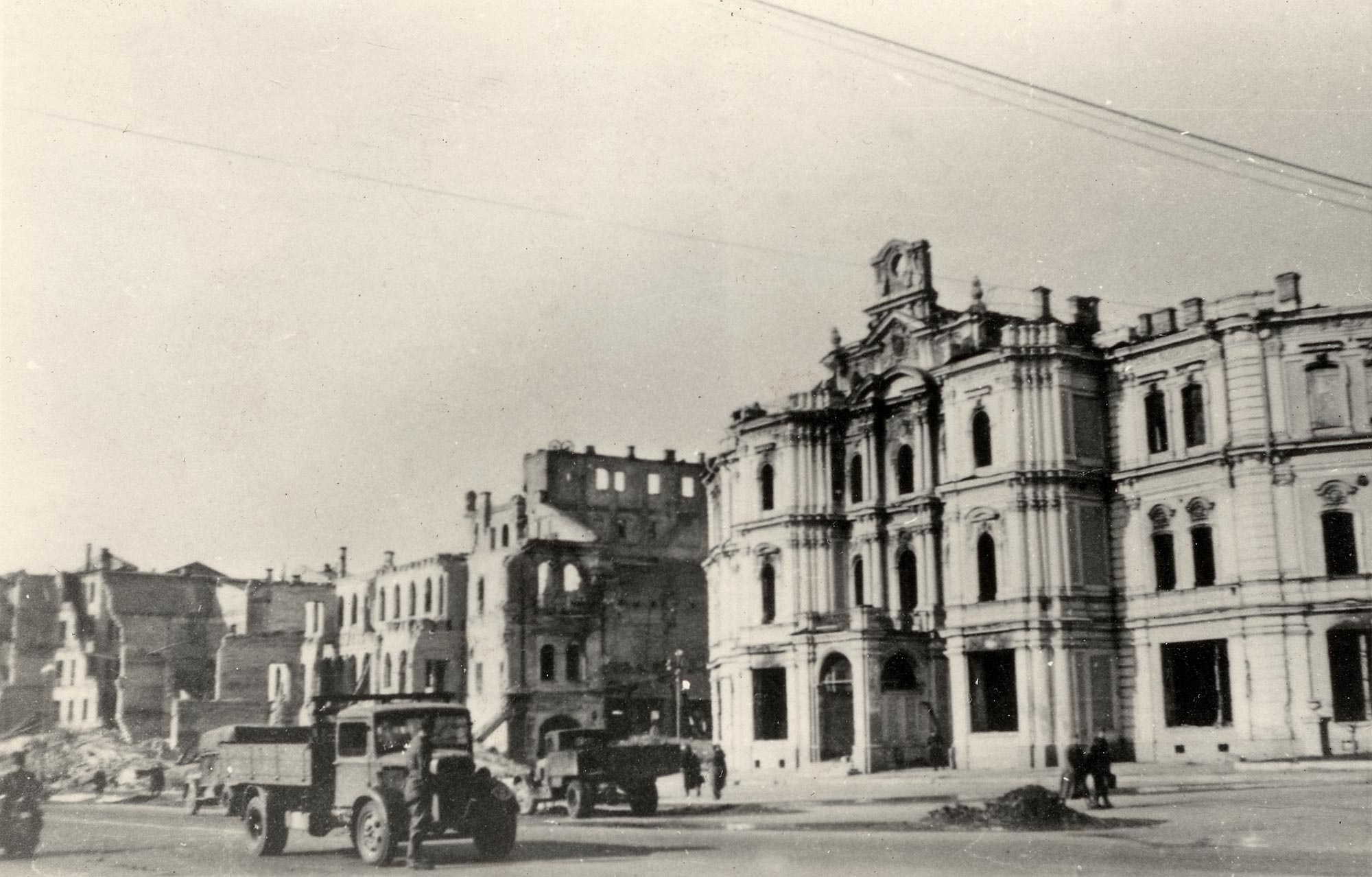
Much of the square was destroyed in the Second World War.

In 1919, the square was renamed Soviet Square. From 1935, it was called Kalinin Square, after Mikhail Kalinin, the first chairman of the Supreme Soviet of the USSR.

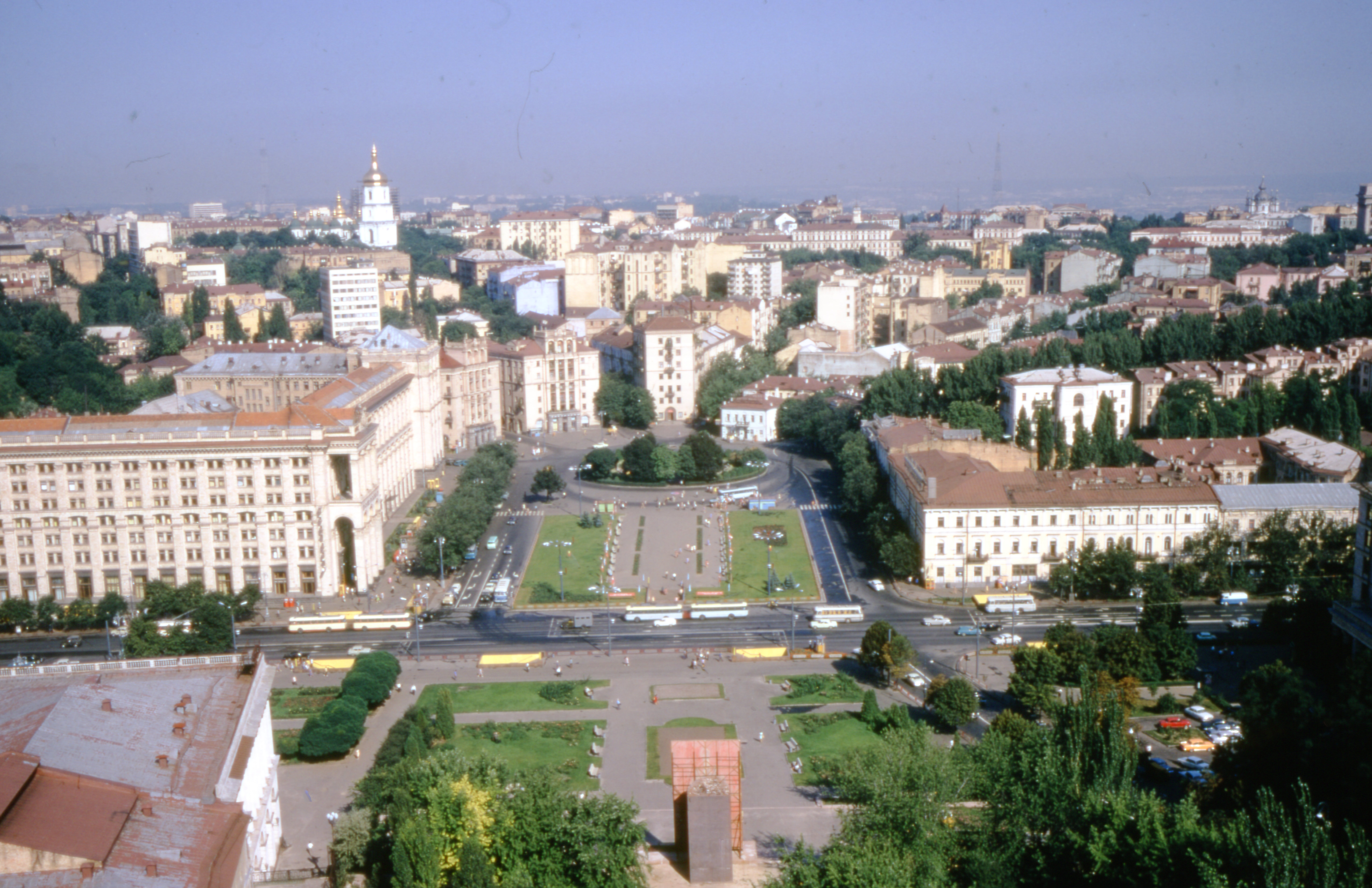
During the times of the Soviet Union, the square was also called Kalinin Square

During the first couple of years after the war, the square was completely rebuilt from scratch. It was architecturally integrated with the newly constructed Khreshchatyk in the typical (for the time) neo-classical Stalinist architecture. The newly constructed Kyiv Central Post Office and Trade-Union House with its high-rise clock located in the square, is very well known and frequently appears in pictures of the center of the city.

In 1976–77, as a part of metro construction, much of the square was again rebuilt, and it was renamed October Revolution Square (Ploshcha Zhovtnevoyi revolyutsii). During the reconstruction, the massive cubist monument to commemorate the 60th anniversary of the October Revolution was put up as was the complex ensemble of fountains.

During the Soviet period, the square was used for demonstrations and parades in honor of May 1 (until 1969), Victory Day and the October Revolution.

=== Independent Ukraine ===
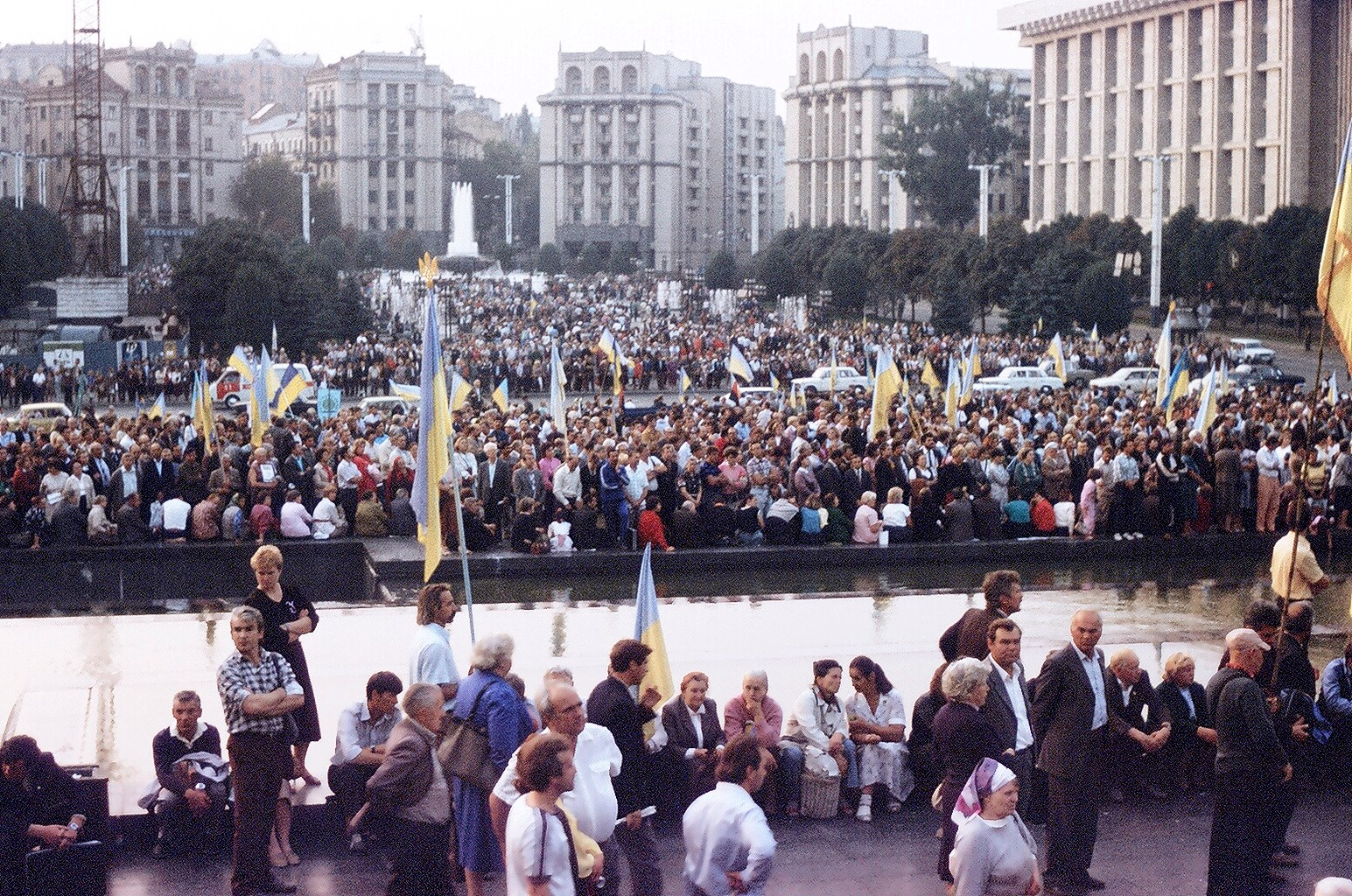
A meeting in support of Ukrainian independence on Maidan Nezalezhnosti during the early 1990s

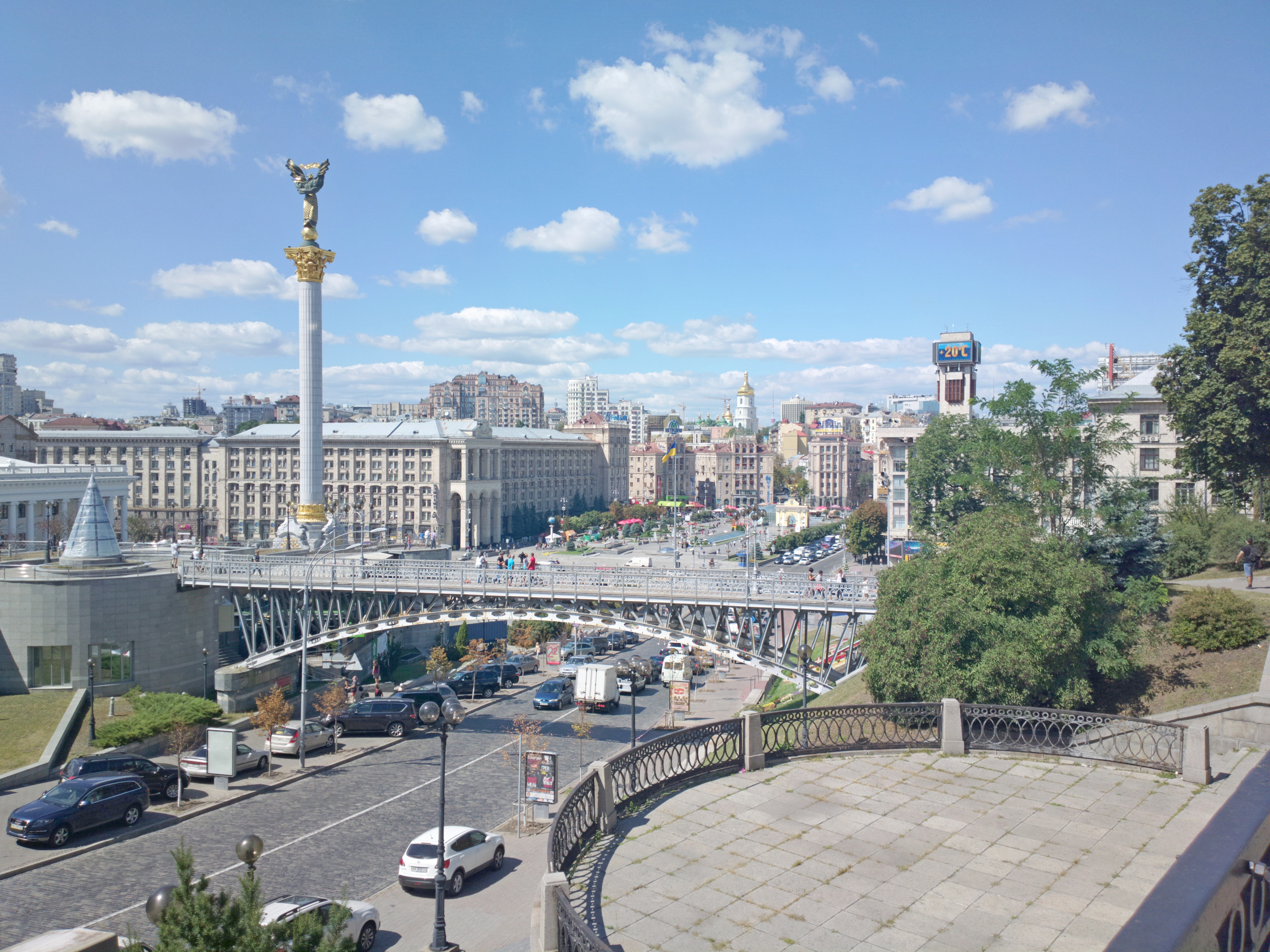
View of the Bridge over Instytutska Street ("Heavenly Hundred Bridge")

After Ukraine's independence in 1991, the square was given its current name. The competing proposal of Liberty Square (Ploshcha Svobody) was raised at the time as well as in the years to follow, but the current name commemorating the Ukrainian independence is now firmly associated with the square (see the section below).

In 2001, as the square was the major center of the "Ukraine without Kuchma" mass protest campaign, the new extensive construction of the area was abruptly ordered by the Kyiv mayor of the time, Oleksandr Omelchenko. The square was fenced off for construction and became inaccessible for the protesters and many observers claimed that the main goal of the project ordered by the city mayor was to disrupt the protests, especially since similar tactics were commonly used by local authorities throughout Ukraine.

Following the construction, the previous look of the square, with its many fountains, was significantly altered and the public reaction to the new look of the square was mixed at first. However, by now the square's monument to Kyi, Shchek, Khoryv and Lybid, the legendary founders of Kyiv, the folklore hero Cossack Mamay, the city's historic protector Archangel Michael as well as a more modern invention, the protecting goddess Berehynia surmounting the Independence Monument victory column commemorating the independence of Ukraine, and the many glass domes are easily recognisable as parts of the modern city centre.

A mostly underground shopping mall called Globus was built under the square to replace the old and shabby giant underpass formerly dubbed by Kyivans as "Truba" (the Tube).

Trade-Unions House was severely damaged during the fire in February 2014, so later it went through a reconstruction.

Future developments of the square include the demolition of the old Hotel Ukraine (formerly hotel "Moskva"), and building a new 68-floor building instead.

During the Russo-Ukrainian war, a drone fell on the square during a Russian attack on 16 March 2026.

== Symbol of political activity ==
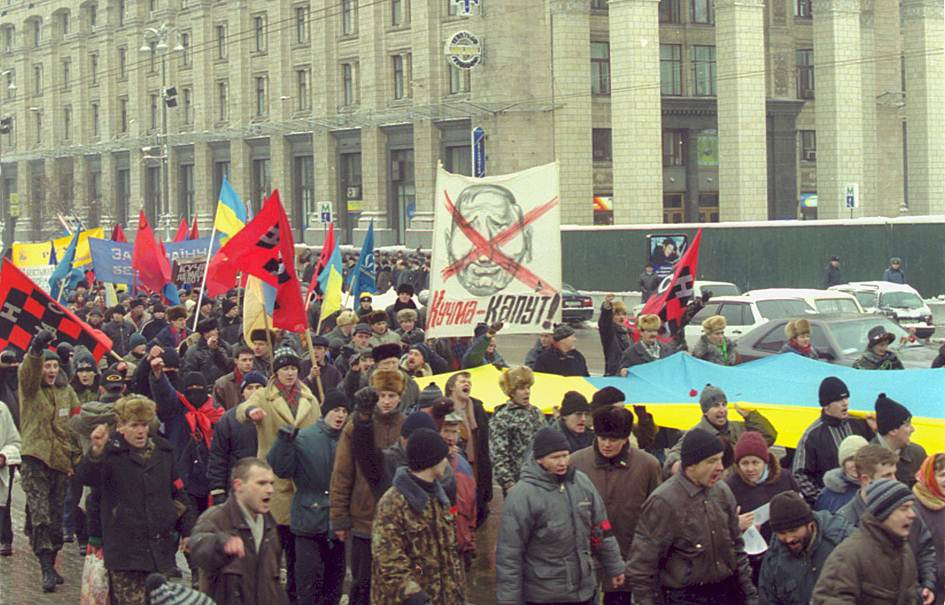
Participants of Ukraine Without Kuchma in the square, February 2001

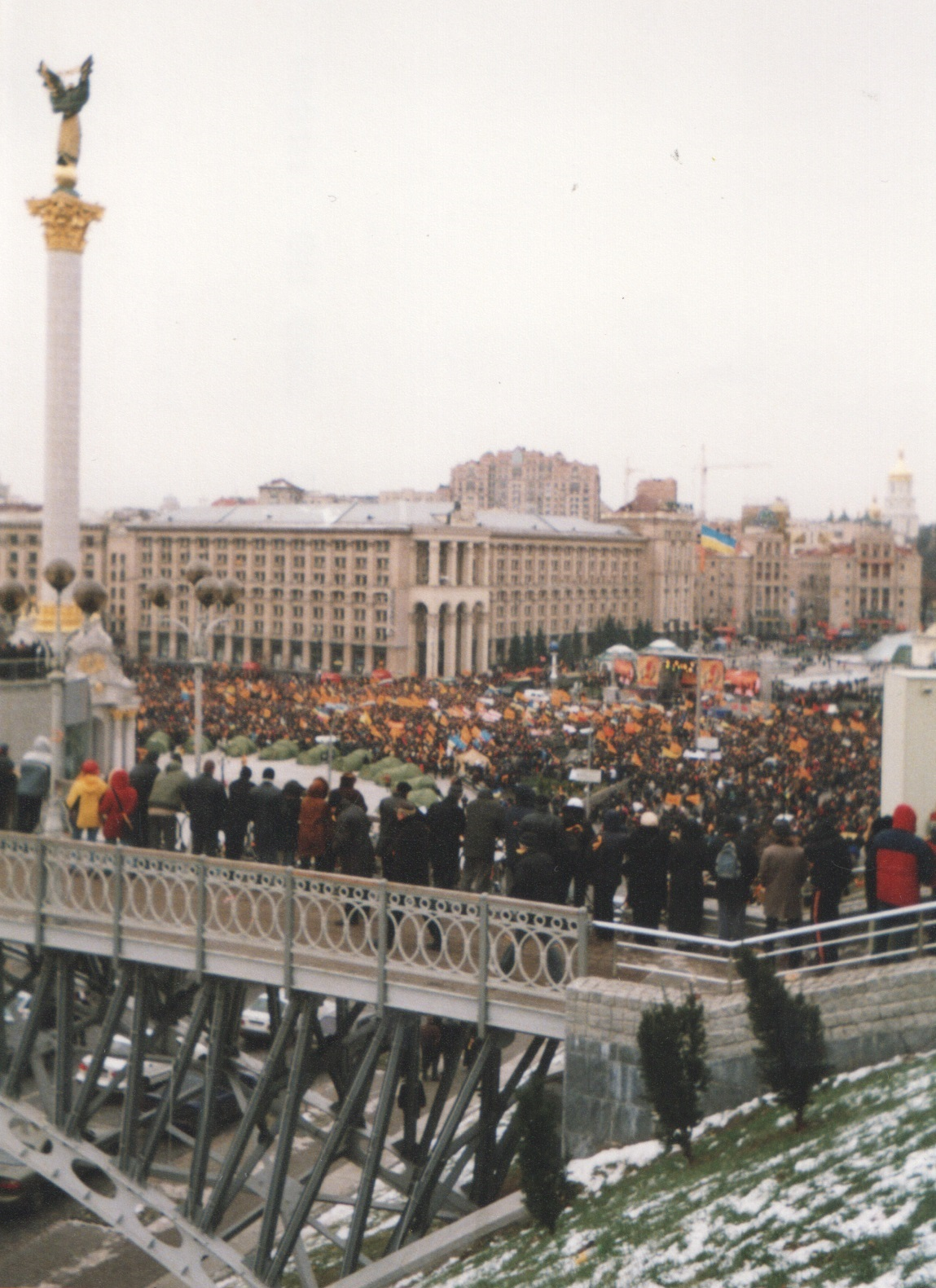
View of Maidan during the Orange Revolution in November 2004

As the central Kyiv square, following the end of Soviet era the Maidan has been the centre of public political activity. In the autumn of 1990, students' protests and hunger strikes also known as the Revolution on Granite at the Maidan resulted in the resignation of the Chairman of the Cabinet of Ministers of the Ukrainian SSR Vitaliy Masol.

In the 2000s, the biggest political protests in Ukraine, such as the Ukraine without Kuchma campaign and the Orange Revolution took place in this square. During the Orange Revolution in late 2004, Maidan Nezalezhnosti received global media coverage, as hundreds of thousands of protesters gathered in the square and nearby streets, and pitched tents for several weeks, enduring the cold and snow. One of the eminent activists during that time became Paraska Korolyuk. The protests against electoral fraud resulted in an additional round of presidential elections being ordered by the Supreme Court of Ukraine, which were won by the opposition candidate, Viktor Yushchenko.

Following his election as the President of Ukraine, and after taking the official oath in the parliament, Yushchenko took a public oath at Maidan Nezalezhnosti in front of his numerous supporters.

After the Orange Revolution, Maidan Nezalezhnosti continues to attract political protesters. Mass rallies for political candidates have attracted large numbers, with the 2009 "Batkivshchyna" party congress (during which Yulia Tymoshenko was nominated as a candidate for president) being a notable example that brought nearly 200,000 people to the square.

The square was the site of Euromaidan protests beginning in November 2013, progressing to violent clashes, fires, and ending in the February Revolution of Dignity. The square was covered in protesters all day and night since 1 December 2013. On 27 January 2014, Ukrainian police reported a 55-year-old man from Western Ukraine found dead hanging from the framework of a huge artificial 'New Year tree' in central Kyiv. The body was found hanging inside the cone-shaped tubular steel construction on Kyiv's Independence Square. The tree, which had become a symbol of anti-government resistance, was at that time decorated with a poster of jailed opposition leader Yulia Tymoshenko and scrawled with graffiti opposing President Viktor Yanukovich. The Revolution of Dignity of the following month led to more than 100 people perishing.

Since the Russian invasion of Ukraine, a makeshift memorial has been set up in the square to commemorate those killed in the conflict. In 2025, the square hosted a funeral ceremony for journalist Victoria Roshchyna, who died in suspicious circumstances under Russian captivity.

== Landmarks ==
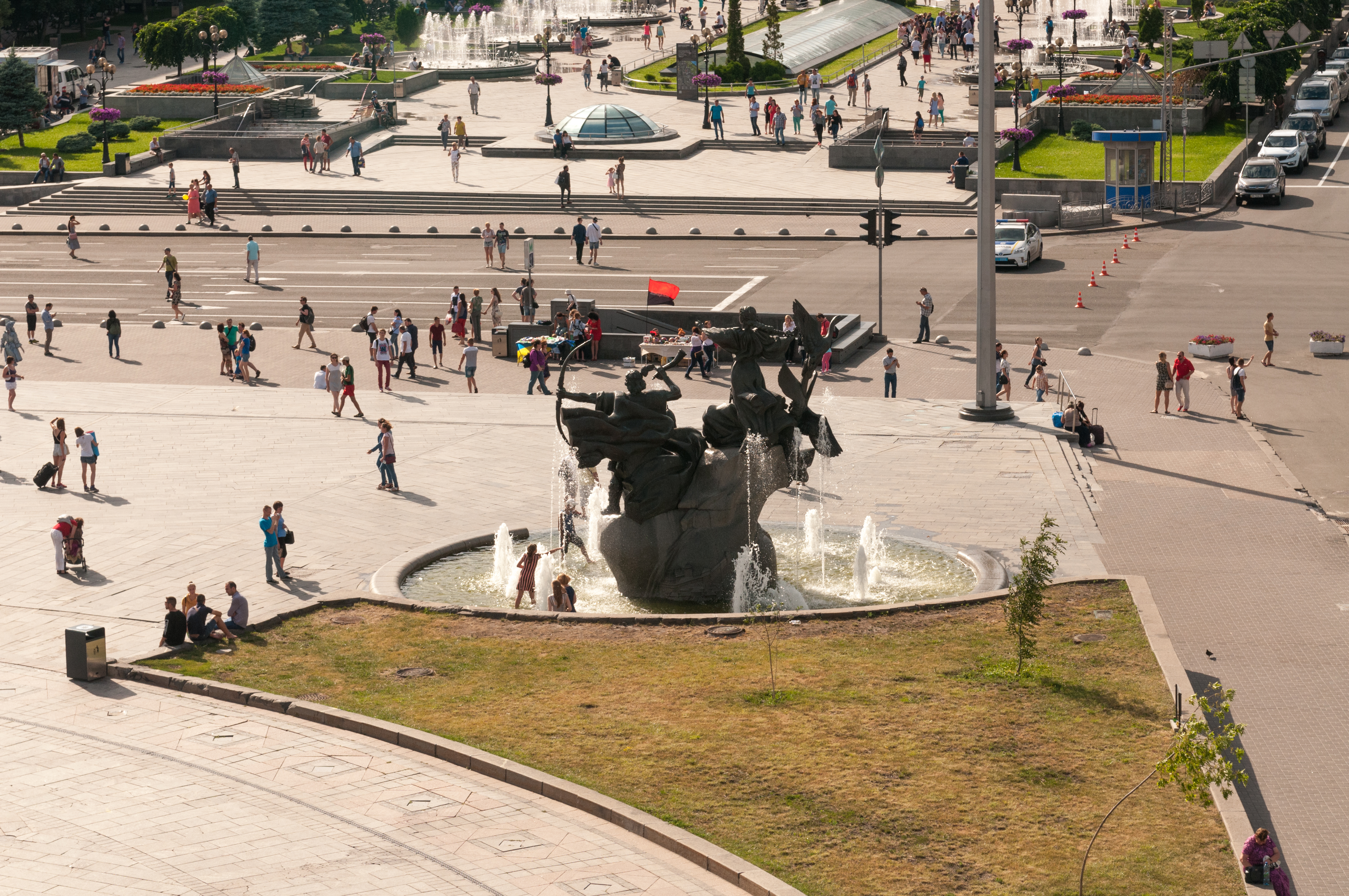
The monument to the founders of Kyiv and the glass domes of the shopping center Globus 1

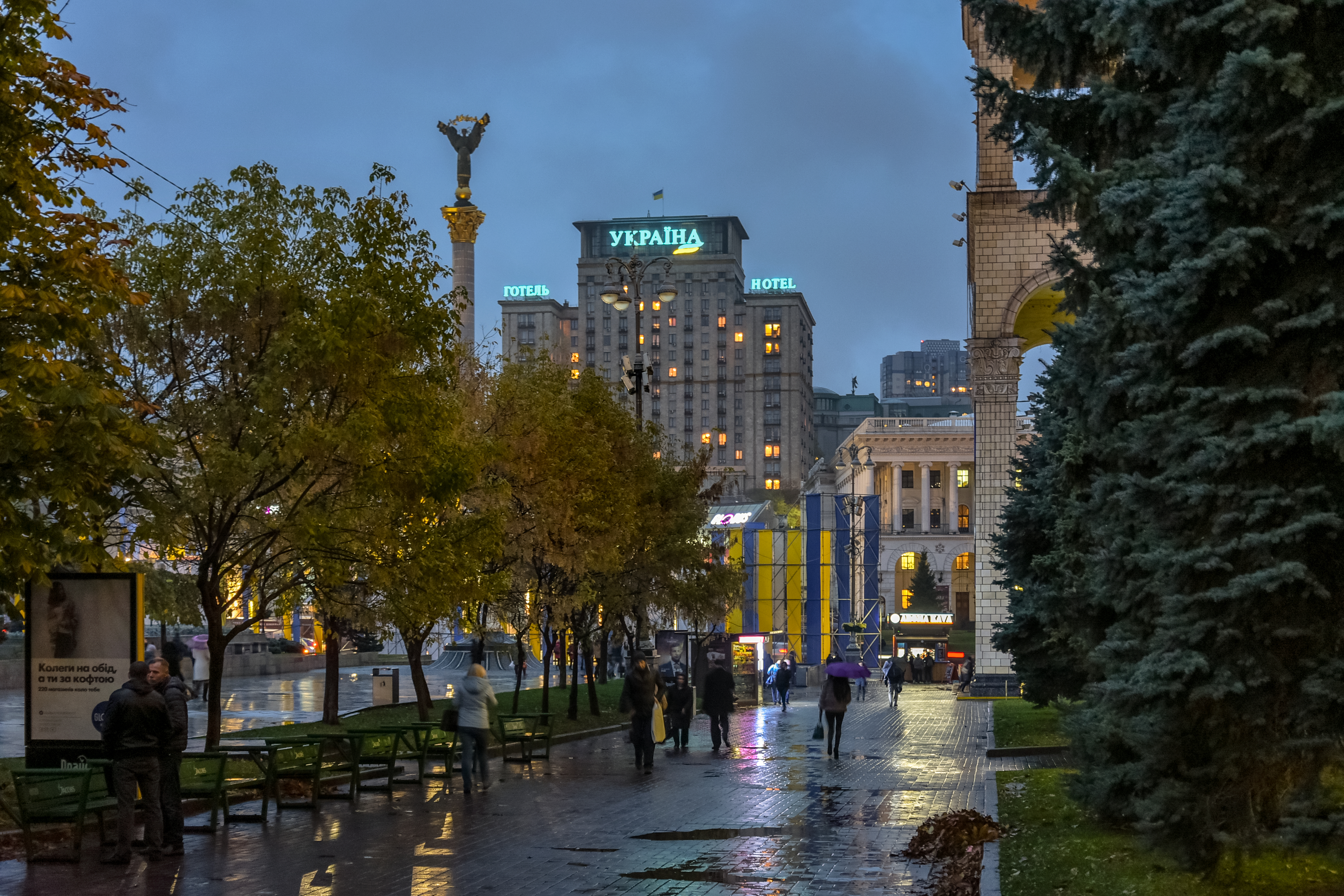
View of Hotel Ukraine from the square

=== Current landmarks ===
- Monument to the Founders of Kyiv
- Independence Monument, a victory column commemorating the independence of Ukraine in 1991, surmounted by the protectoress Berehynia
- Lach Gates

=== Former landmarks ===
- Monument to Pyotr Stolypin
- Bust to Karl Marx
- Monument to the Great October (Lenin)

=== Important buildings ===
- Globus ("Globe") underground shopping mall
- Ukrainian National Academy of Music, until December 2025 this conservatory was named after the Russian composer Pyotr Ilyich Tchaikovsky
- Hotel Ukraine
- Building of the Trade Unions Federation of Ukraine
- Central Post Office
- Information and Exhibition Centre of the Maidan Museum

== Gallery ==
Changes in the appearance of the square during 150 years
- Landscape of Khreshchatytska Square. From the series of Polish engravings "Picturesque album of Kyiv. 1861 year"
- Square near Duma Square. The beginning of the 1910s
- Soviet Square. 1930s
- Kyiv during the occupation. 1941-1942 years
- The ruins and frame of the burned 12-story "Ginzburg skyscraper" on Kalinin Square after liberation from the Nazis. 1944 year
- Victory parade on Kalinin Square in Kyiv. 1945 year
- Kalinin Square after reconstruction. 1950s
- The view of the square from the side of the current Instytutska Street. 1954 year
- Construction of the "Moscow" hotel. 1957 year
- Salute on Kalinin Square. 1962 year
- October Revolution Square. 1970s
- The almost 9-meter granite Lenin became the central figure of the monument to the October Revolution. 1980 year
- After the reconstruction, fountains appeared on the square. 1970s
- The new fountain on Revolution Square. 1981 year
- Dismantling of the monument to the October Revolution in Kyiv. September 12, 1991
- Construction works on Independence Square. 1998 year
- Construction works on Independence Square. 2001 year
- Erection of a stele on the Maidan in honor of the Independence of Ukraine. 2001 year
- The opening ceremony after the reconstruction of the Maidan. August 24, 2001
- Maidan during the Orange Revolution. 2004 year

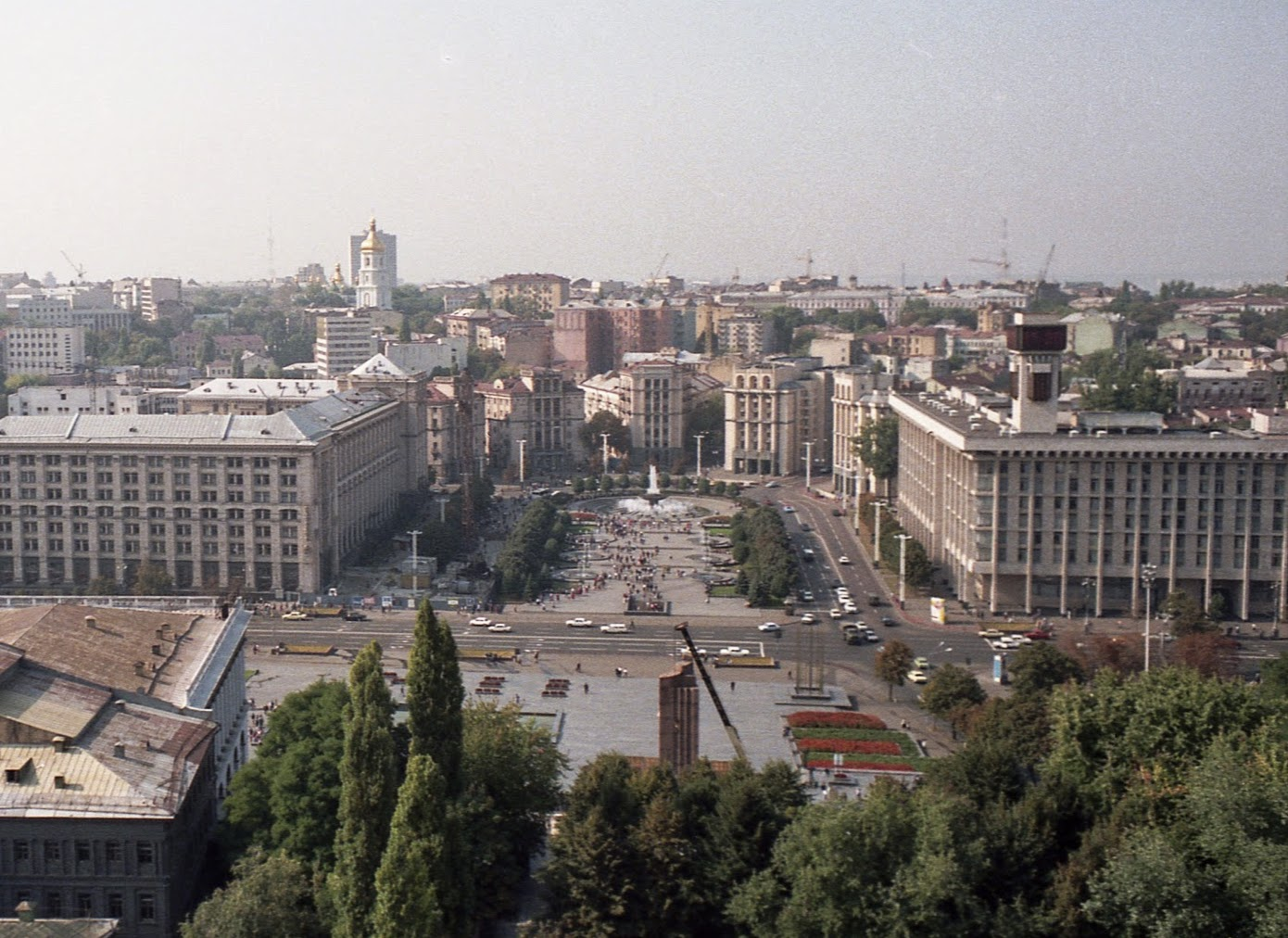
View of Maidan from the Hotel Moscow, September 1991 (after the August 1991 Declaration of Independence of Ukraine).

Maidan Nezalezhnosti after a 2002 renovation, in the exact spot where the City Duma once stood. Instytutska Street is to the far left.

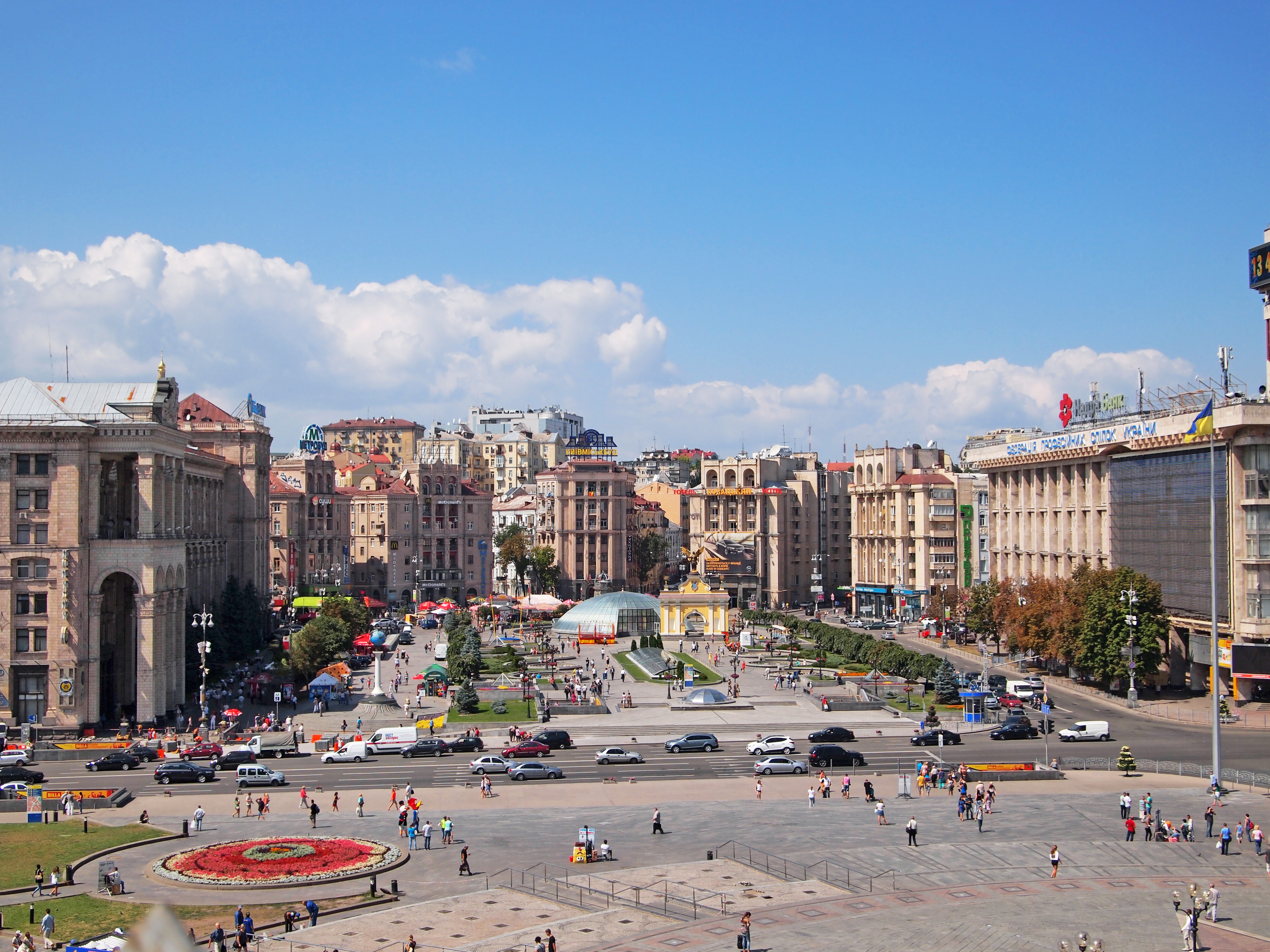
Maidan Nezalezhnosti, 2013, before Euromaidan.

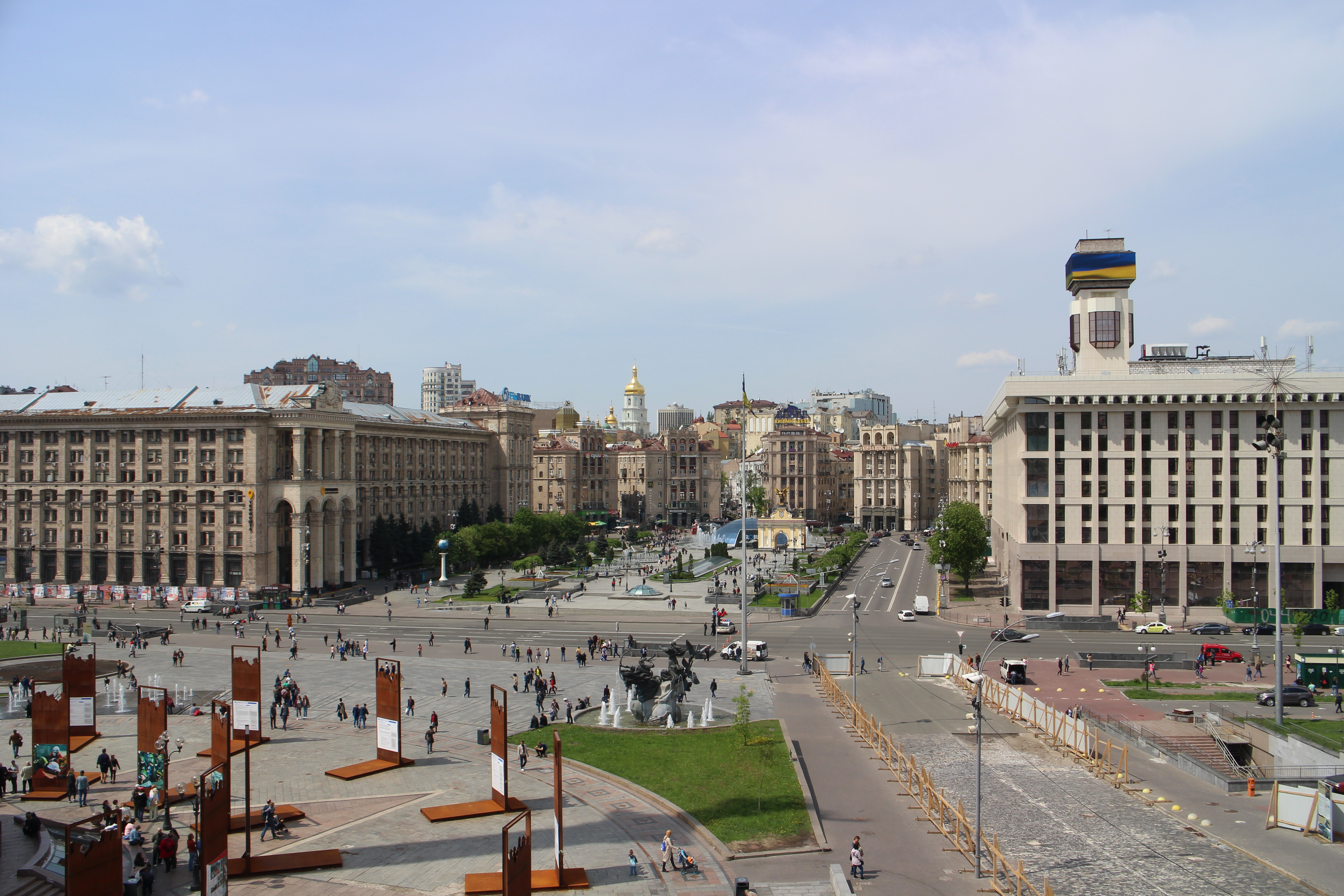
Maidan Nezalezhnosti, 2019, after Euromaidan.

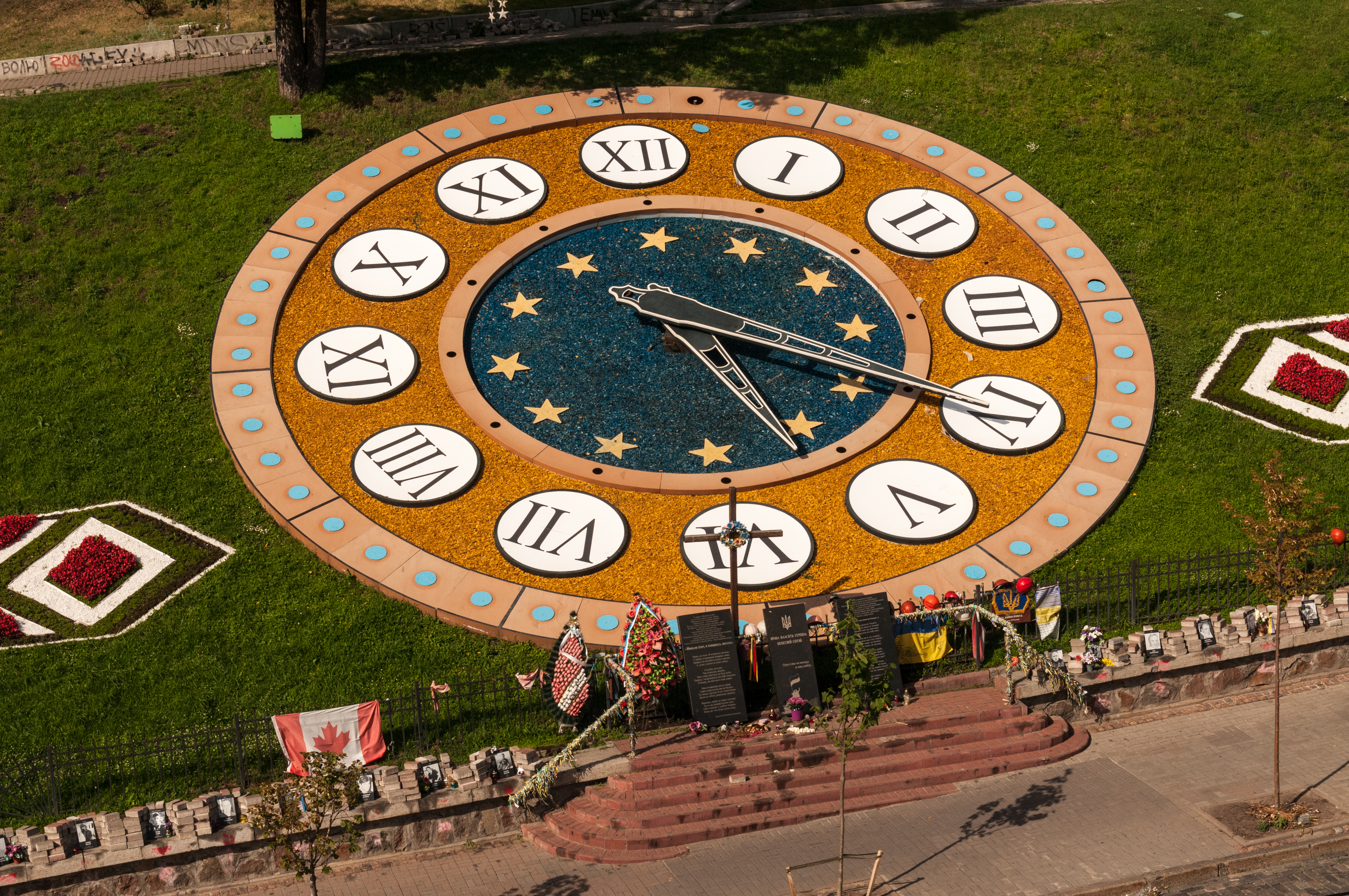
A floral clock above the Alley of Heroes of the Heavenly Hundred

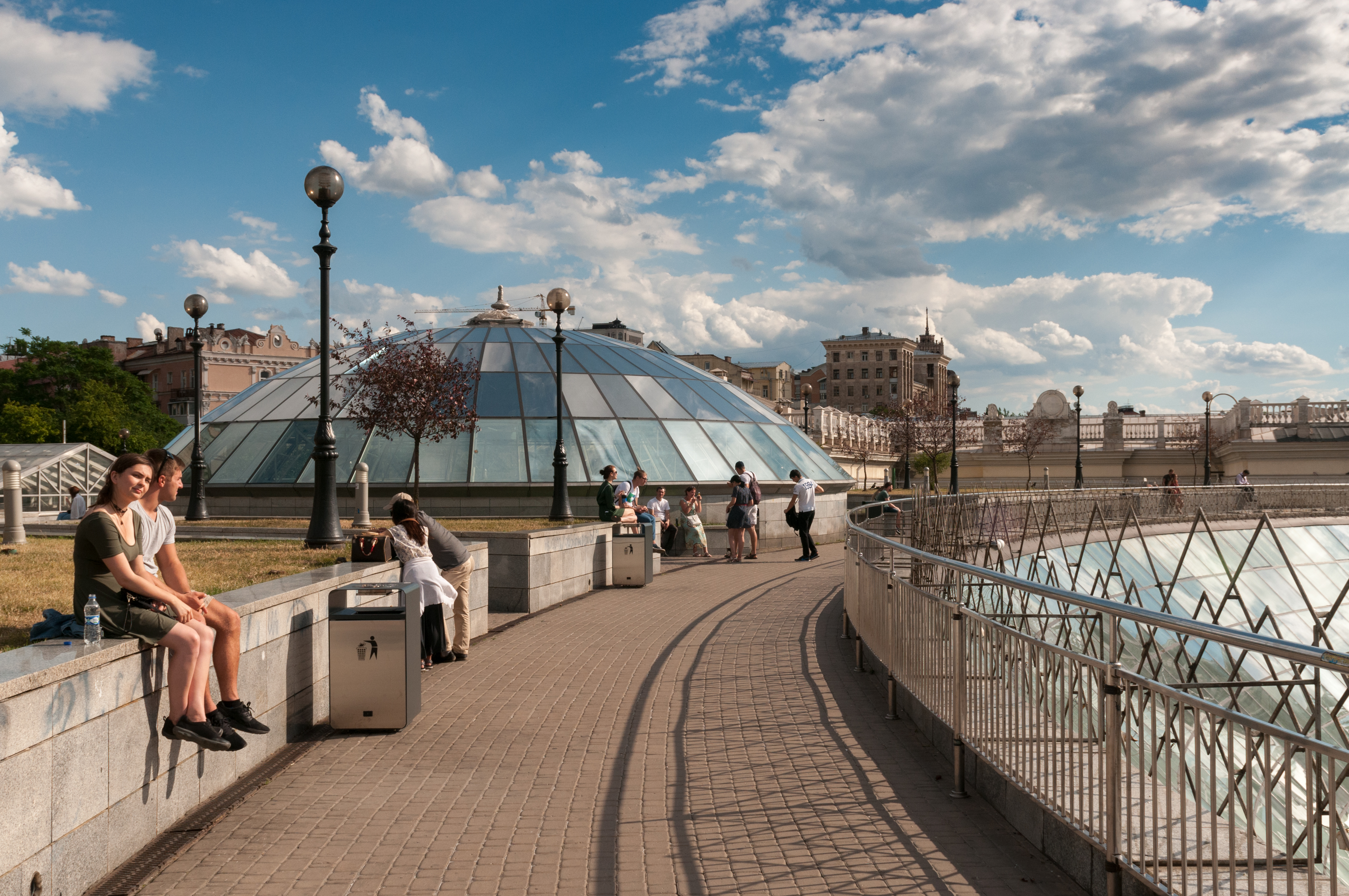
Pedestrian gallery above the Globus Mall

== See also ==
- Alley of Heroes of the Heavenly Hundred
- Euromaidan
- Karaoke on the Maidan
- Orange Revolution
- Ukraine without Kuchma
