= Maidan Museum =

National memorial in Kyiv, Ukraine

National Memorial Complex of the Heroes of Heavenly Hundred - Museum of the Revolution of Dignity
- Національний меморіальний комплекс Героїв Небесної Сотні – Музей Революції Гідності
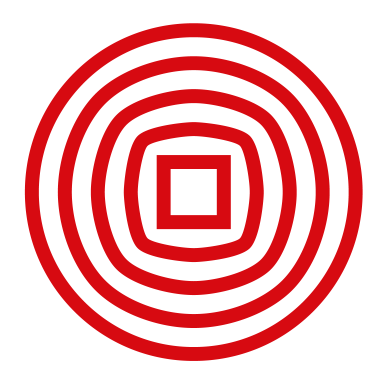
- Logo of the Maidan Museum
- Former name: Maidan Museum; Freedom Museum
- Established: 20 January 2016
- Website: maidanmuseum.org/en

National Memorial Complex of the Heroes of Heavenly Hundred - Museum of the Revolution of Dignity (Ukrainian: Національний меморіальний комплекс Героїв Небесної Сотні – Музей Революції Гідності), known colloquially as Maidan Museum (Ukrainian: Музей Майдану) is a national memorial dedicated to the history of the Euromaidan movement and preceding protest movements in Kyiv. the capital of Ukraine.

== History ==
The museum was founded on 20 January 2016 as a result of a civic initiative, which first emerged in January 2014 amidst the ongoing protests, and aimed to document the events of the Revolution of Dignity. Members of the initiative encouraged activists participating in the protest to gather personal witnesses and material artifacts from the protests. Many exhibits gathered for the museum suffered during attacks on locations occupied by the protesters by government forces, with some being confiscated by communal services and the polics.

In 2017 a plot of land was allocated to the museum in central Kyiv. A German architectural bureau won a contest to project the new museum building, and construction works were planned to commence in late 2023, but were postponed due to the Russian invasion of Ukraine. Additionally, works on the creation of a memorial to the Heavenly Hundred in nearby Instytutska Street are being complicated by the fact that court proceedings on the events which took place at the location during the Revolution of Dignity are still ongoing, and the area must be preserved in its original state for possible investigations.

In May 2026, a law removing obstacles for the museum's construction was signed by Ukrainian president Volodymyr Zelenskyi. On 20 June 2026, the beginning of construction works on the museum and memorial was announced in a joint declaration issued by the institution's general director and head of the Office of the President of Ukraine. The project of the museum has been approved during open hearings with participation of experts, architects and families of fallen Heavenly Hundred heroes.

== Operations ==
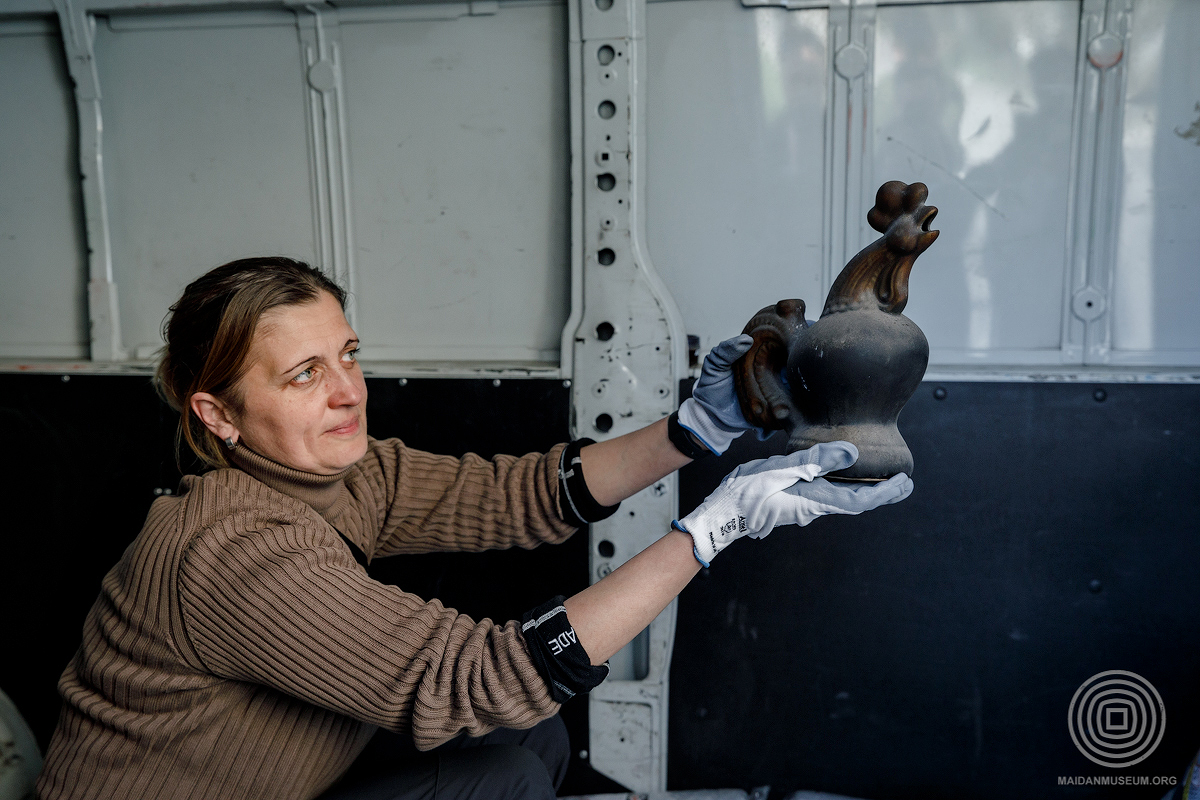
Transferring of an exhibit from Borodianka to Maidan Museum

Currently the museum has a status of a national memorial and owns three hectares of land in downtown Kyiv, operating at seven locations, but lacking its own building. The material base of the institution is estimated to have a value of over 300 million hryvnias, and in addition to a unique collection of artifacts, which numbers almost 9,000 items, it operates a digital archive. As of 2026, the Maidan Museum has organized 230 exhibitions, as well as numerous events and campaigns both in Ukraine and abroad. In addition to the Revolution of Dignity, the museum's collection is dedicated to the Revolution on Granite and Orange Revolution.

The museum's informational centre is located at the restored Trade Unions Building in Kyiv, which served as one of the bases of protesters and was burned down on 19 February 2014. On the tenth anniversary of Euromaidan a large exhibition was organized by the museum in Ukrainian House and Kyiv History Museum. Currently the museum is actively gathering artifacts and documentary evidence from the frontlines of the Russo-Ukrainian War and works to preserve Ukrainian cultural heritage threatened by the Russian invasion.

== Exhibits ==
The museum's exhibitions includes the famous "Yolka" - the carcass of a New Year Tree, which had been planned for installation at Kyiv's Maidan Nezalezhnosti by the Party of Regions government and was captured by protesters, who placed their posters and flags on the structure. Other notable artifacts preserved in the museum are a marble sculpture installed on the square during the protest campaign, as well as several banners decorated by the protesters. The museum also includes exhibits from Euromaidan protests in other regions of Ukraine.
