= Paraska Korolyuk =

Ukrainian political activist

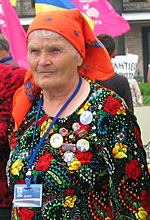
Paraska Korolyuk in 2006

Paraska Vasylivna Korolyuk (Ukrainian: Параска Василівна Королюк, commonly known as Baba Paraska (Granny Paraska; Ukrainian: баба Параска); 3 May 1939 – 26 November 2010) was a Ukrainian political activist and one of the iconic figures of Ukraine's 'Orange Revolution'. An enthusiastic supporter of former Ukrainian President Viktor Yushchenko and of Yulia Tymoshenko, she became well-known after camping in the tent protests 'sit-ins' at Maidan Nezalezhnosti, which occurred during the Orange Revolution's entire duration, and for participating in various other political protests.

Acknowledging her contribution, in 2005 Viktor Yushchenko awarded Korolyuk Ukraine's Order of Princess Olga, 3rd grade, during a ceremony at Mariinskyi Palace in Kyiv. In March 2007, Korolyuk was accepted into the Our Ukraine party. Despite the split between the Orange Revolution's leaders, Korolyuk remained a staunch defender of Yushchenko and Tymoshenko.

== Life ==
Korolyuk was an inhabitant of Dorogichivtsy village in the Ukraine's Ternopil Oblast. For about twenty years, she worked on a collective farm as a milkmaid, then as a watchman, and later on a radio station. During the Soviet era, she was awarded the Medal "Veteran of Labour". From the end of the 70s up to the 90s she was on earnings in Kazakhstan. On the eve of the 2004 Ukrainian presidential election Korolyuk 'stumped' (campaigned) for Viktor Yushchenko in many villages in central and western Ukraine. In 2005 she went to Maidan Nezalezhnosti with her three daughters. In the same year, she met then Ukrainian First Lady Kateryna Yushchenko, and presented some embroidered pieces to her. Kateryna Yushchenko reciprocated with gifts to Korolyuk’s grandchildren. Korolyuk spent several months campaigning widely across Ukraine to raise support for Yushchenko. Yushchenko's dismissal of Tymoshenko as Prime Minister motivated Korolyuk to travel to Kyiv; reportedly she hoped to reconcile the Orange Revolution's leaders.

During her travels, Korolyuk did not have a clear itinerary, and her travel plans frequently changed. However, she often returned to Kyiv to visit the president, give him accounts of public opinion, and pass along presents from herself or other people. She once said that she sometimes waited for hours near the Presidential Secretariat for the president to appear. Korolyuk was survived by six grandchildren.
