= Kyiv Passage =

Coordinates: 50°26′52″N 30°31′28″E

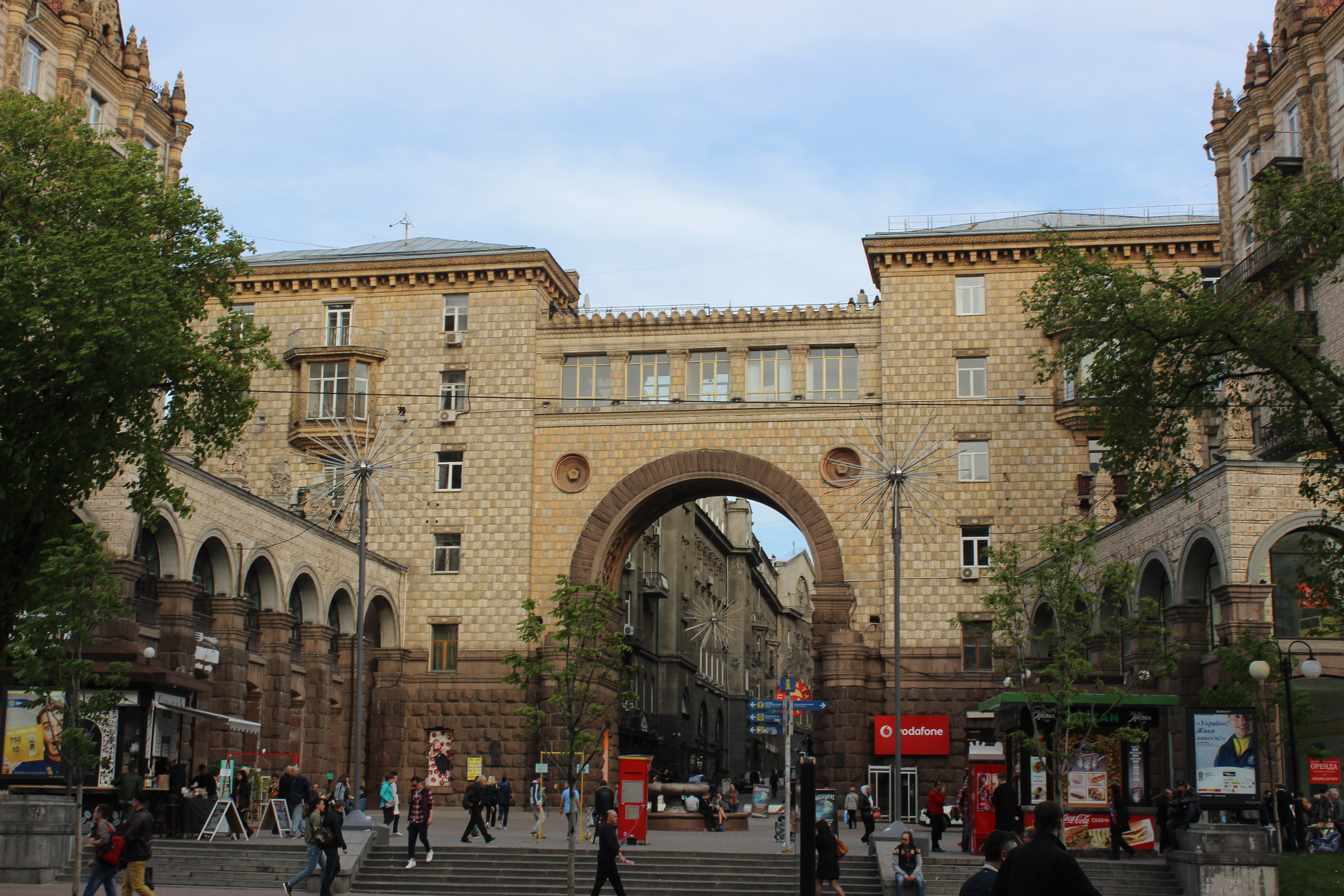
- A view from inside the Kyiv Passage
- Interactive map of the Kyiv Passage area

Immovable Monument of Local Significance of Ukraine
- Official name: Прибутковий і конторський будинок страхової компанії "Росія", в якому жили митці С.І. Паторжинський, В.М. Риков, В.П. Некрасов, Б.Р. Гмиря, М.С. Гришко, А.Л. Міхньов, І.І. Нехода, С. Юткевич (The commercial and office building of the insurance company "Rosiya", where the artists S. I. Patorzhynskyi, V. M. Rykov, V. P. Nekrasov, B. R. Hmyria, M. S. Hryshko, A. L. Mikhniov, I. I. Nekhoda, and S. Yutkevych lived)
- Type: Architecture, Urban Planning, History
- Reference no.: 62-Кв

The Kyiv Passage (Ukrainian: Київський Пасаж, romanized: Kyivs'kyi Pasazh; as in the French word Passage) is a building complex with a small, narrow street (passage) stretched through it. The street address of the building is Khreshchatyk, 15, city of Kyiv. The passage connects two parallel streets: Khreshchatyk and Zankovetska Street, and runs parallel to vulytsia Arkhitektora Horodetskoho.

The street has many small outdoor cafés and shopping stores on the buildings' first floors and residential apartments on the upper floors.
