= Natalia Valevska =

Ukrainian singer (born 1981)

Natalia Valevska Наталія Валевська
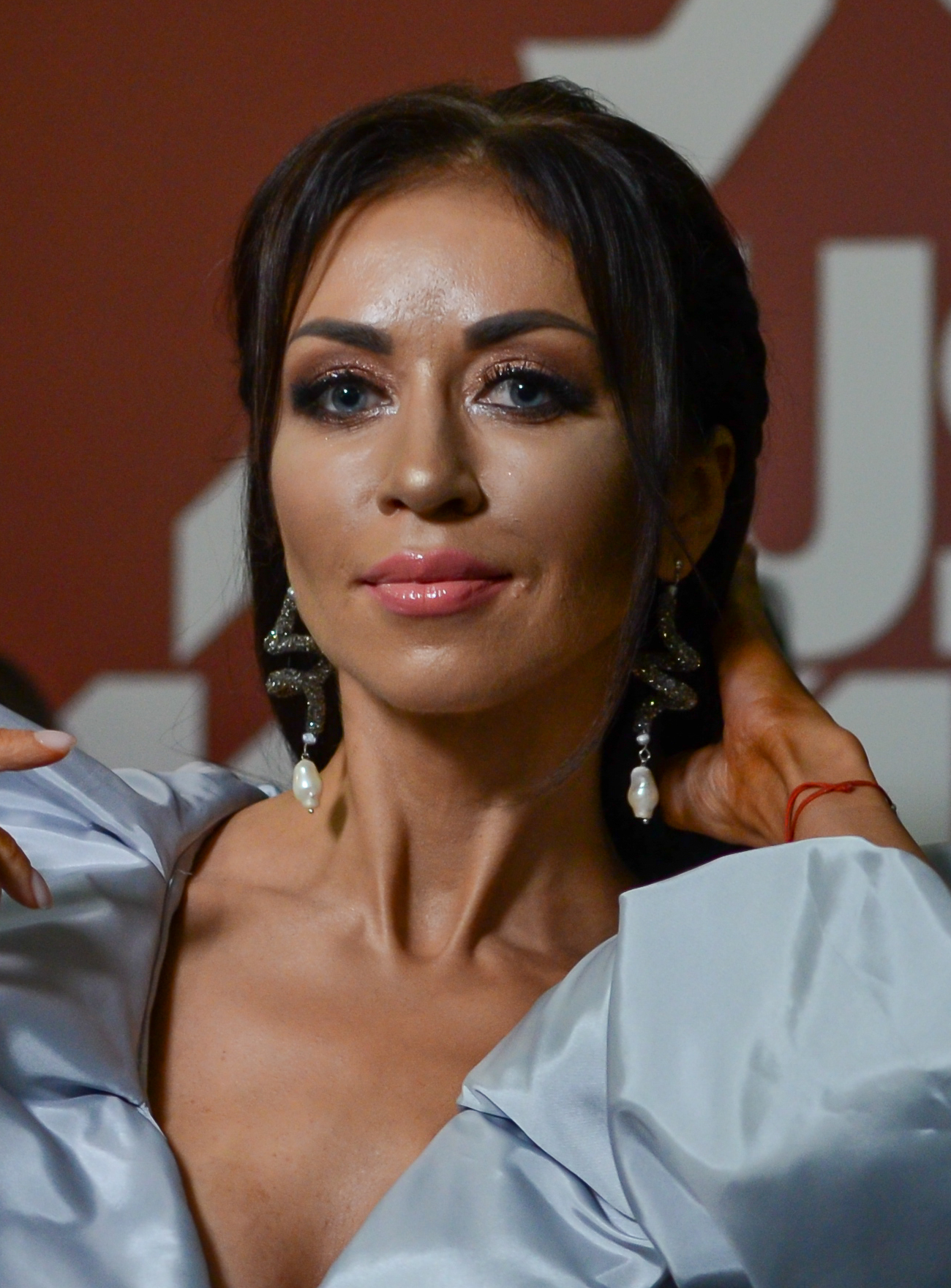
- Valevska in 2019

Background information
- Born: Natalia Oleksandrivna Valevska; 10 June 1981 (age 45); Khmelnytskyi, Ukrainian SSR, USSR
- Genres: Pop, dance
- Occupations: Singer, songwriter
- Instrument: Vocals
- Label: Bayans Music Production
- Website: valevskaya.com

Natalia Oleksandrivna Valevska OS (Ukrainian: Наталія Олександрівна Валевська; Russian: Наталья Александровна Валевская; born 10 June 1981) is a Ukrainian singer and songwriter.

== Early life ==
At the age of 18, Valevska won the "Song of the Bug" contest for young performers. In 2007, she graduated with academic excellence in Musical Art from Kyiv National University of Culture and Arts.

== Career ==
In 2005, Valevska recorded a duet song with Vladimir Grishko (soloist of the Kyiv Opera House). Her first album, Otpusti ("Release"), came out in 2006; it included songs in Russian, Ukrainian, Italian and French. In 2007, the singer represented Ukraine as a debutante at the Vienna Ball, acted in the Russian film productionLonely Angel, and released her second album Bez tebya ("Without you"). A joint tour of Valevska and Alexander Peskov took place in 2010. Her third album Zhelaniya sbudutsya ("Desires come true") was released at the end of 2010; it included songs personally chosen by Alla Pugacheva. Valevska collaborated with Russian composer Viktor Drobysh to write the song "Tsvet lyubvi" ("The color of love"), which she sang in duet with Avraam Russo.

== Awards ==
Natalia Valevska has won at the international contest "Seven Cultures", international competition of young performers "The Bridges of Friendship", and the contest of young pop song performers "Popstars". In 2003, she came second at the international song contest named after Volodymyr Ivasyuk. In 2004, she received the Grand Prix of the international contest "Yalta-2004" within the TV festival "Sea Friends" and a UBN Award in the category "Breakthrough of the Year" in the United Kingdom. In 2005, she won the Chance TV contest and the third prize at the international song festival "Slavic Bazaar" in Vitebsk. In 2007, she got the first prize at the "Yalta - Moscow Transit" music contest. In 2008 she participated in the international festival "Moon Cat" in Lloret de Mar, Catalonia. It was followed by the all-Ukrainian prize "Woman of the Third Millennium" in the category "Perspective of Third Millennium", and she was invitated by the National Olympic Committee of Ukraine to support the national team at the Olympic Games in Beijing; her song "Dve ostanovki ("Two stops") won the national Ukrainian contest "Golden Song Of The Year". Valevska won the first prize at the international competition by Alla Pugacheva "Alla is Searching for Talent" in 2009. She came second at the Folk Star III TV contest, in a duet with Tanya Ftemova. She participated in the contests "Golden Gramophone-Ukraine" and the international Crimea Music Fest in 2011. She was awarded the "Crystal Microphone" in the category "National Recognition of the Year" on 9 August 2011.

== Charity ==
Natalia Valevska is the founder and president of her own charity foundation, and was awarded the Order of St. Stanislaus for Charity in 2008 as well as the Order of Martyr Barbara (2nd class) in 2011 by the Patriarch of Kyiv Volodymyr Sabodan. Besides this, she has taken part in numerous charity events:

- 2006–2011: all-Ukrainian charity event "Vid sertsia do sertsia" ("From heart to heart");
- 2009: charitable program "Big Band Holiday Assistance", Kraków; charity concert "Do Not Give AIDS a Chance"; charity concerts "Stars Give Hope" and "Svit dityachih mriy, svit talantiv" ("Word of childish dreams, word of talents");
- 2009–2011: collecting funds for charitable projects related to protecting and improving the health of children;
- 2010: event in support of orphans "Fun on the Ice to Help the Children"; event in support of children with hearing impairment "Ball of Star Trees"; charity concert "Dopomozhi – Tse prosto" ("Help – it's easy"); special charity event "Make Your Childhood Dream Come True";
- 2011: charity event on World Blood Donor Day; charity event "To the Heart with Much Heart"; charity festival "Mom + I", Dnipropetrovsk.

== Discography ==
=== Albums ===
- 2006 – Otpusti ("Release")
- 2007 – Bez tebya ("Without you")
- 2010 – Zhelaniya sbudutsya ("Desires come true")

=== Singles ===
- "Adagio" (with Vladimir Grishko)
- "Bez tebya" ("Without you")
- "Veteranam minuvshey voyny" ("To veterans of the passed war")
- "Dve ostanovki" ("Two-stops")
- "Den' rozhdeniya" ("Birthday")
- "Dno lyubvi" ("The bottom of love")
- "Zhelaniya sbudutsya" ("Desires come true")
- "Kray" ("The edge")
- "Molchaniye" ("Silence")
- "My shagnem na kray zemli" ("We step on the edge of the earth")
- "Na pereput'ye" ("At the crossroads")
- "Odnovo tebya lyublyu" ("I love only you")
- "Otpusti" ("Release")
- "Palala" ("Shine")
- "Polovinka lyubvi" ("Half of love")
- "Ranennoye serdtse" ("Wounded heart")
- "Sotnya bessonnykh nochey" ("A hundred sleepless nights")
- "Shchastlivyye chasov ne nabludaut" ("Happy people don't watch the time")
- "Tvoye molchaniye" ("Your silence")
- "Tsvet lyubvi" ("The color of love", with Avraam Russo)
