= Karry G =

Ukrainian musical artist

DJ Karry G
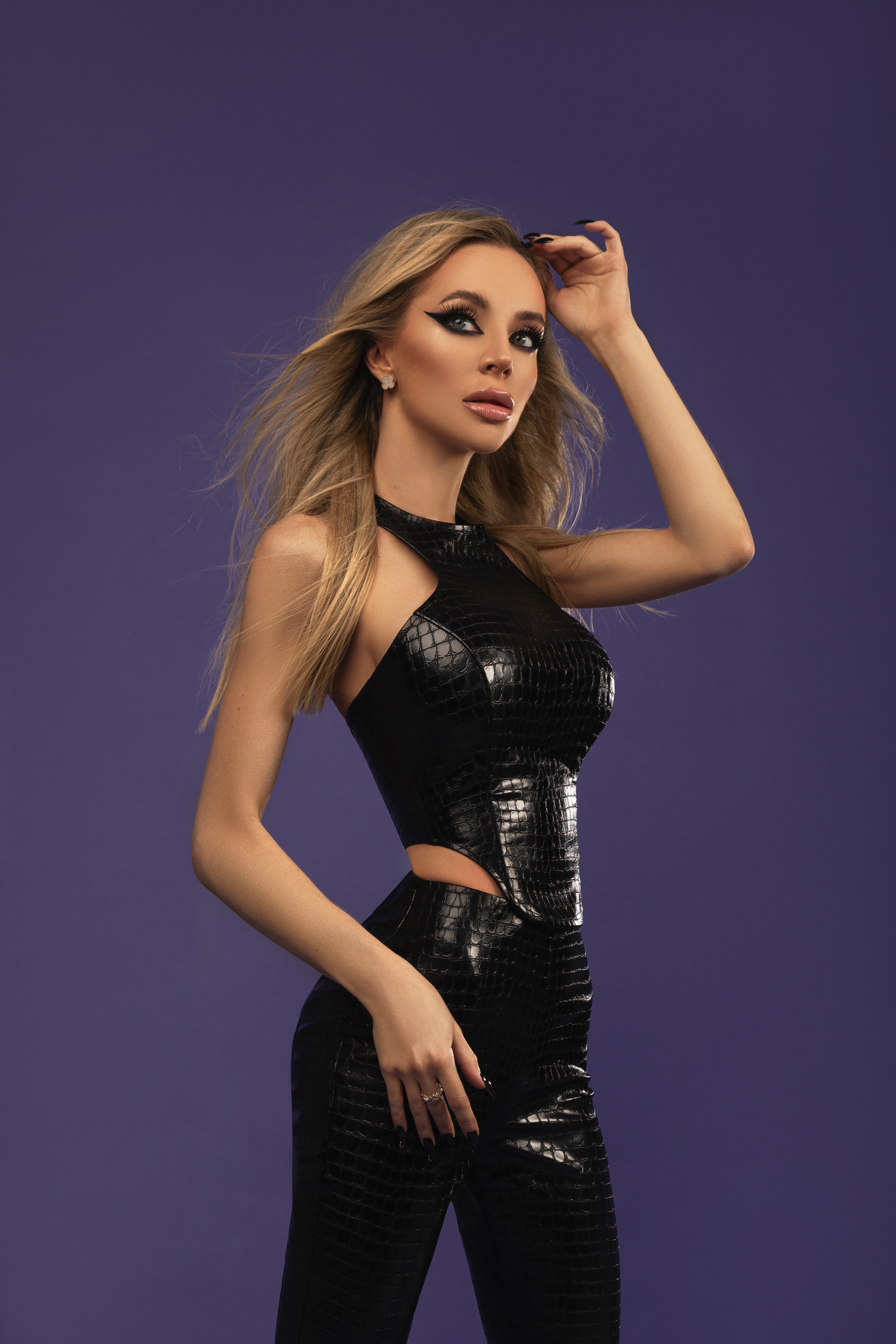

Background information
- Origin: Kyiv, Ukraine
- Genres: melodic house, Progressive house
- Occupations: DJ, vocal
- Years active: 2022 –present
- Website: https://www.instagram.com/karryg_ofc/

Karry G (Ukrainian: Кері Джи) is a Ukrainian vocal DJ She was born in Kerch (The Autonomous Republic of Crimea) on June 6, 1990.

After finishing secondary education, she graduated the Kyiv National Linguistic University. She also finished the Kyiv Humanitarian Academy, specializing in English language and literature, and has a bachelor's degree in English literature.

Electronic music has always been a source of inspiration and interest for her. Karry began playing music as a kid by attending a piano school and then taking singing lessons.

2023 became the pivotal year for Karry G as she realized that she wanted to be a vocal DJ (a disc-jockey that is playing and singing her own music)

Her main genres are progressive, melodic techno and house

After a successful start, she actively began to prepare her own EP albums, and in a short time some of them took top places in the world charts.

The track “Weightless” was supported by Paul van Dyk in his radio show VONYC Sessions, Episode 899.

The track “Be My Beacon” was supported by Paul van Dyk in his radio show VONYC Sessions, Episode 922.

== Singles ==
Released	Title	Label
2023	Like a rush	Panda Lab Records

== EP's ==
Released	Title	Label
2023	From the ashes	Synergy Recordings
2023	Welcome to my Universe	Panda Lab Records
2024	Shadow	Area Verde
2024	Navigate	Area verde
2024	Don't wake up	Axiom music
2024	The Journey	IAMT Music Group
2025	Tale Maro	Frequenza
2025	Bando	Frequenza
