= Kyiv National Linguistic University =

Public university in Kyiv, Ukraine

- Київський національний лінгвістичний університет
- Motto: Ad orbem per linguas
- Type: Public
- Established: 1948
- Affiliations: Ministry of Education and Science of Ukraine
- Academic affiliations: IAU
- Rector: Sergii Sorokin
- Administrative staff: --
- Students: 5772
- Location: Kyiv, Ukraine; 50°25′37″N 30°31′06″E
- Campus: vul. Velyka Vasylkivska, 73
- Website: knlu.edu.ua/en/

University rankings

Regional – Overall
- QS Emerging Europe and Central Asia: 301-350 (2022)

The Kyiv National Linguistic University (Ukrainian: Київський національний лінгвістичний університет, romanized: Kyivskyi natsionalnyi linhvistychnyi universytet) is a public university located in Kyiv, Ukraine. It was founded in 1948 as Kyiv State Pedagogical Institute of Foreign Languages. Kyiv National Linguistic University was ranked the fourth best Ukrainian university specializing in Social Science and Arts and Humanities in 2012.

== History ==
Kyiv National Linguistic University is the successor of the Kyiv State Pedagogical Institute of Foreign Languages, established by the Ministry of Education of the USSR on March 30, 1948. By decree of the Cabinet of Ministers of Ukraine of August 29, 1994, the Kyiv State Pedagogical Institute of Foreign Languages was renamed Kyiv State Linguistic University. Since its founding, the university has made significant achievements in the field of foreign linguistics.

In the 1948/49 academic year, the university had three faculties (English, French and Spanish), with 238 first year students. The institute employed 19 full-time and 11 part-time teachers at the time. The Faculty of the German Language was formed in 1953, the Faculty of the Russian Language for Foreigners in 1977, and the preparatory department for foreign citizens in 1983. Post-graduate courses have been offered since 1962, and doctoral courses since 1992.

After Ukraine gained independence, KNLU has endeavored to train highly qualified specialists (teachers and interpreters) in foreign languages. Since 1990, the number of students has doubled, from 3,224 students in 1990 to nearly 6,000 students in 2012, including more than 400 students from foreign countries. Over the last decade, the university established the Economics and Law Faculty, the Faculty of Translation, the Faculty of Oriental Studies, and ten new specialized departments.

The university is a founder of the Ukrainian branch of the International Association of Teachers of English as a Foreign Language (IATEFL). Today, the university maintains comprehensive cooperation with educational and cultural missions of foreign countries in Ukraine (American House, British Council, Goethe Institute, the French Cultural Center, and Japanese Cultural Center). In 1993, the first UNESCO Chair in Ukraine was established at the university.

== Facilities ==
KNLU consists of three educational buildings, four dormitories, a computerized library with more than a million books in storage, ten computer classes able to accommodate up to 300 students, a gym and multiple canteens.

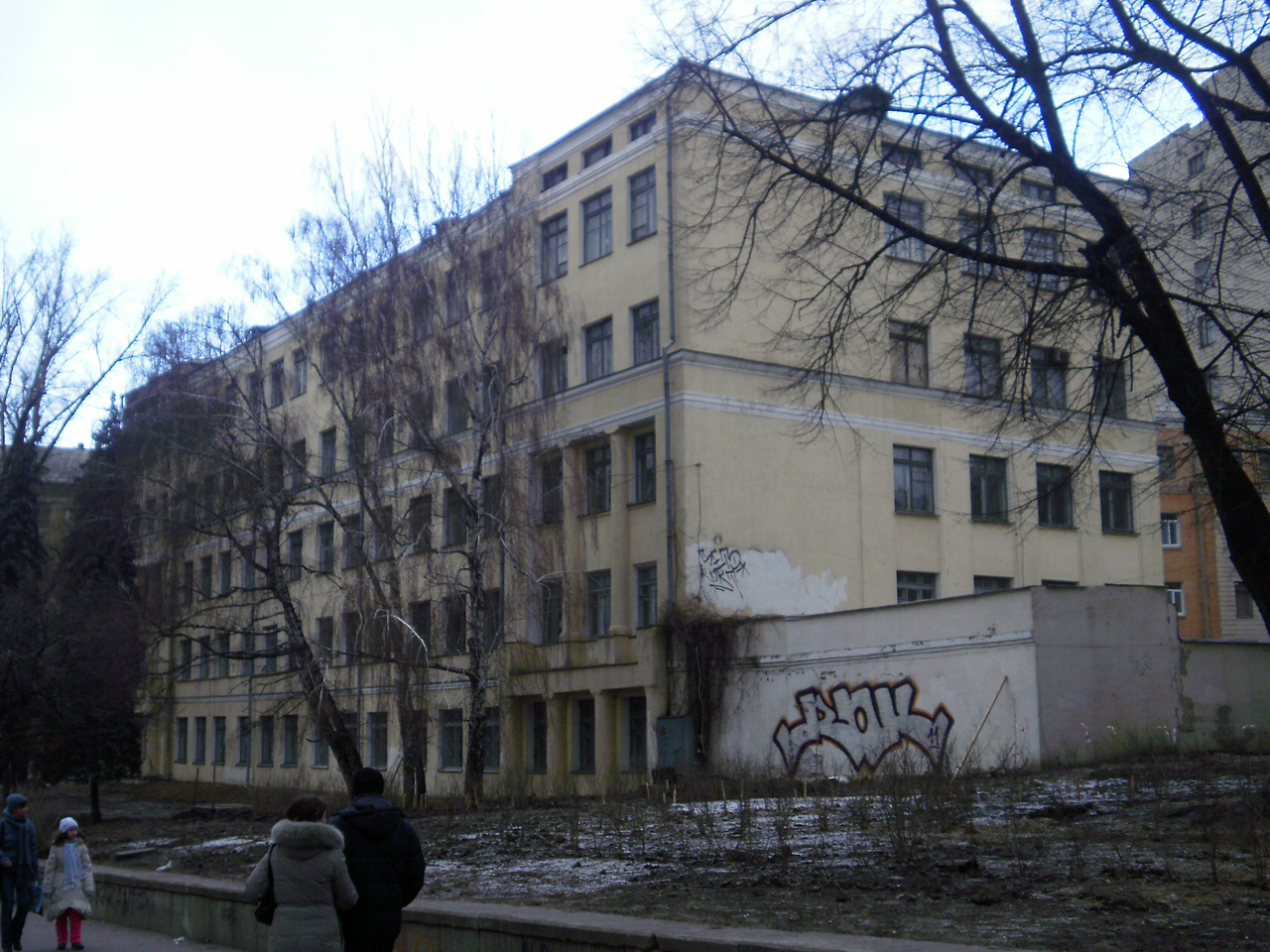
Old part of 1st Building

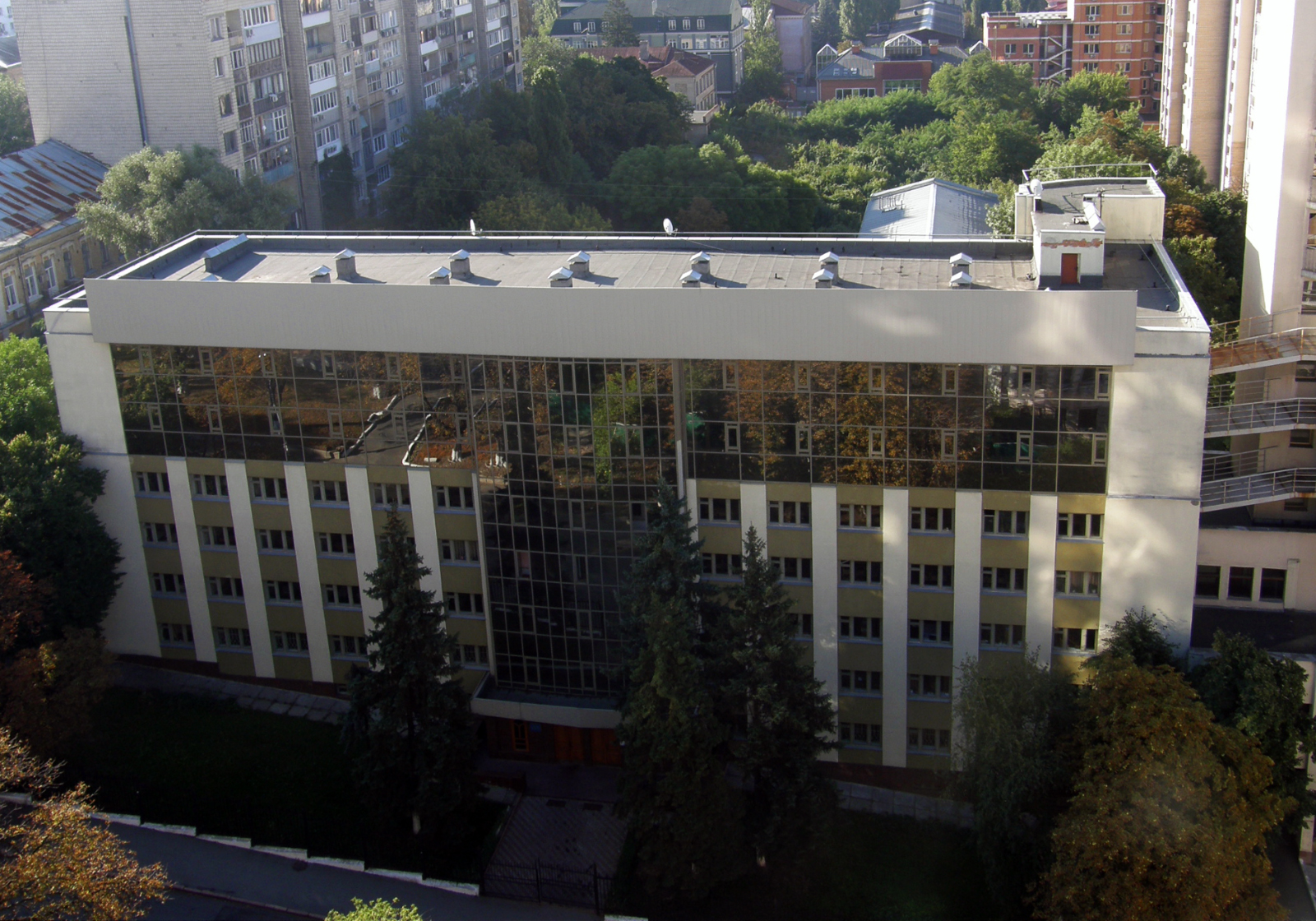
2nd Building

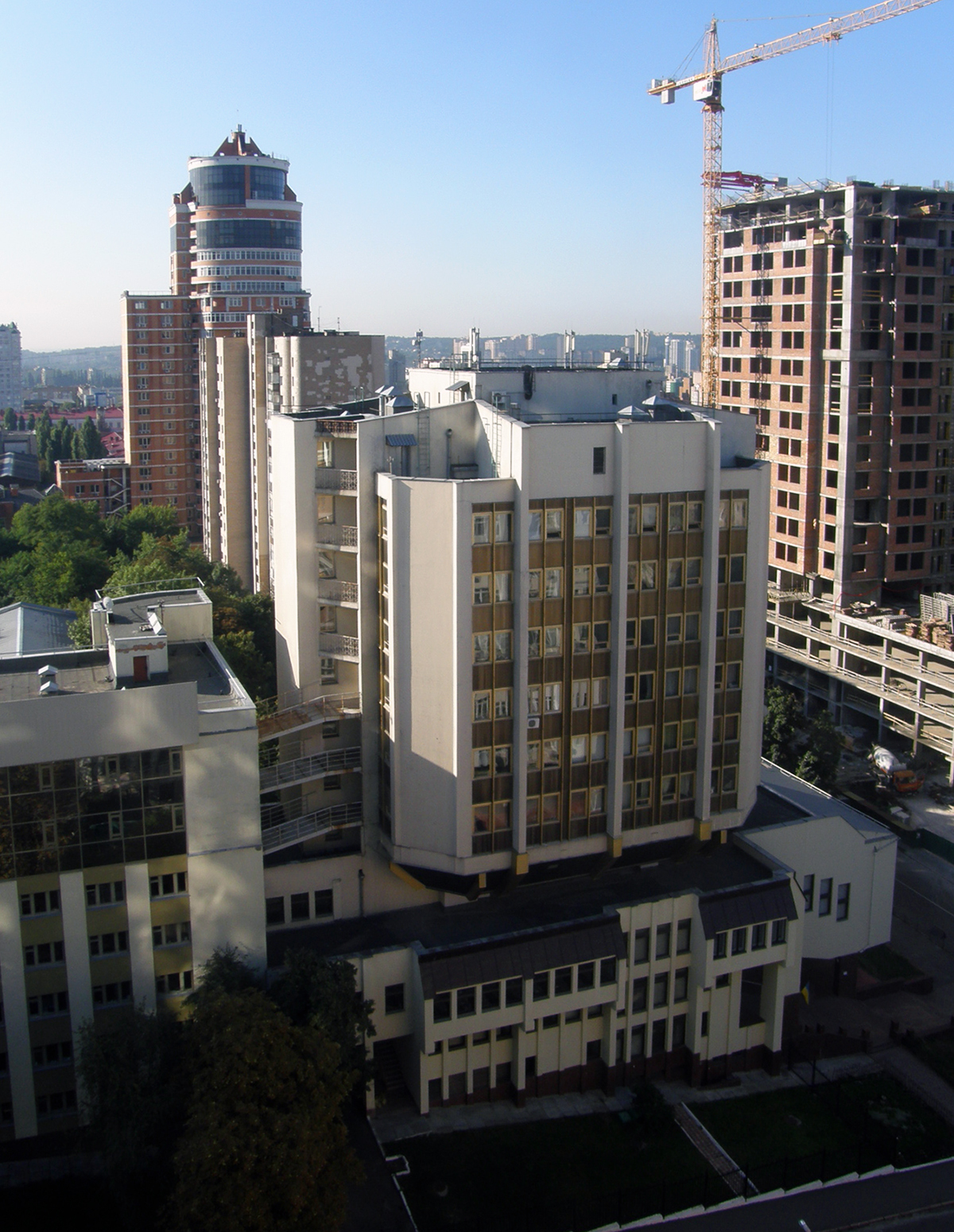
3rd Building

== Structure ==
Kyiv National Linguistic University consists of seven departments

- Germanic Philology Department;
- Romance Philology Department;
- Interpreting and Translation Department;
- Department of Oriental Studies;
- Department of Economics and Law;
- Department of Slavic Philology;
- Preparatory program of the Department of Slavic Philology for International Students.

== Distinguished professors ==
- Nikolayeva, Sofiya Yuriivna – a renowned professor specializing in linguodidactics, author of approximately 150 research papers; supervised 20 PhD candidates; decorated with the Order of Merit (third grade, 1998) as well as many other honorary diplomas by the Ministry of Education of Ukraine; honoured with the title of the Educationalist Emeritus of Ukraine (1992).
- Dvorzhetska, Margaryta Petrivna – supervised 14 PhD candidates, author of approximately 110 research papers; awarded with the Diploma of Honour of the Presidium of the Verkhovna Rada of Ukraine (1990), Makarenko Medal (1985), Yaroslav the Wise Diploma of the Academy of Sciences of Higher School of Ukraine (1996), honorary diplomas of the Ministry of Education of Ukraine.
- Sklyarenko, Nina Kostiantynivna – supervised 10 PhD candidates specializing in Language Teaching Methodology, author of approximately 100 research papers; in 1981 was granted a bronze medal of the USSR National Economic Enterprise General Board of Exhibition of Achievements, in 1984 – the Socialist Republic of Vietnam medal; in 1996 was granted «The Excellent Teacher of Ukraine» medal, in 1998 – the honorary diploma of the Ministry of Education of Ukraine.

== Notable alumni (PhD) ==
- Artemchuk, Halik Isakovych – a chancellor of the Kyiv National Linguistic University from December 26, 1998, to June 10, 2009, professor, a member of the Academy of Pedagogical Sciences of Ukraine, the Educationalist Emeritus of Ukraine; recipient of the Order of Merit of the Second and the Third grades; St. Volodymyr prize laureate; was granted many foreign prizes.
- Vas’ko, Roman Volodymyrovych – a chancellor of Kyiv National Linguistic University from April 2010 until now; Doctor of Philological Sciences, professor; an Educationalist Emeritus of Ukraine.
- Vorobyova, Olha Petrivna – PhD in philology, professor; an Educationalist Emeritus of Ukraine; recipient of a «Social Science Achievements» medal.
- Valihura, Olha Romanivna – PhD in education, professor; has more than 90 academic publications.
- Bihych, Oksana Borysivna – PhD in education, professor; has 100 academic publications.
- Rukina, Emma Petrivna – PhD in philology, professor; an Educationalist Emeritus of Ukraine.
- Fesenko, Valentyna Ivanivna – Doctor of Philology, professor; honored with the Letter of Recognition by the Ministry of Education and Science of Ukraine for a long-term conscientious work, personal contribution into training of highly skilled specialists, prolific academic and pedagogical work; the author of more than 100 scientific publications.
- Kahanovska, Olena Markivna – Doctor of Philology, professor; has more than 100 academic publications.
- Maksymenko, Analoliy Petrovych – Doctor of Education, professor; has more than 50 scientific publications.
- Hrynyuk, Halyna Arkadiyivna – PhD in education, professor; an Educationalist Emeritus of Ukraine.
- Danylych, Valentyna Stefanivna – Doctor of Philology, professor; recipient of the «Sofia Rusova» medal.
- Natalia Chaban – professor of media and communications in New Zealand

== Notable alumni (artists) ==
- Rohosa, Yuriy Markovych – a well-known Ukrainian poet, writer, scriptwriter, author of many songs; is a prizewinner of All-Union «Pisnya Roku» contests in 1988–1992.
- Kurkov, Andriy Yuriyovych – a Ukrainian writer, journalist, scriptwriter; the only writer from the Former Soviet Union countries whose books are included in the top-10 list of the European bestsellers, and are translated into 36 languages.
- Koltsova, Oleksandra – a Ukrainian singer, journalist, composer, poet and producer; a former member of «Krykhitka Zakhes» musical band (1999–2007); a vocalist of «Krykhitka» musical band at the present moment.
- Shurov, Dmytro Ihorovych – a Ukrainian musician, pianist, member of «the Okean Elzy», «Esthetic Education», «Zemfira» and «Pianoboy» musical bands.
- Karpa, Irena Ihorivna – a Ukrainian writer, singer, journalist. She was granted Grand-Prix of the International «Hranoslov» young writers contest in 1999; she was awarded with «Best Ukrainian Awards-2006» prize (in the category of «the youngest writer») in 2006.
- Tamara Viktorovna Trunova – a Ukrainian theater director, the chief director of the Kyiv Academic Theatre of Drama and Comedy on the left bank of Dnieper.

== Gallery ==
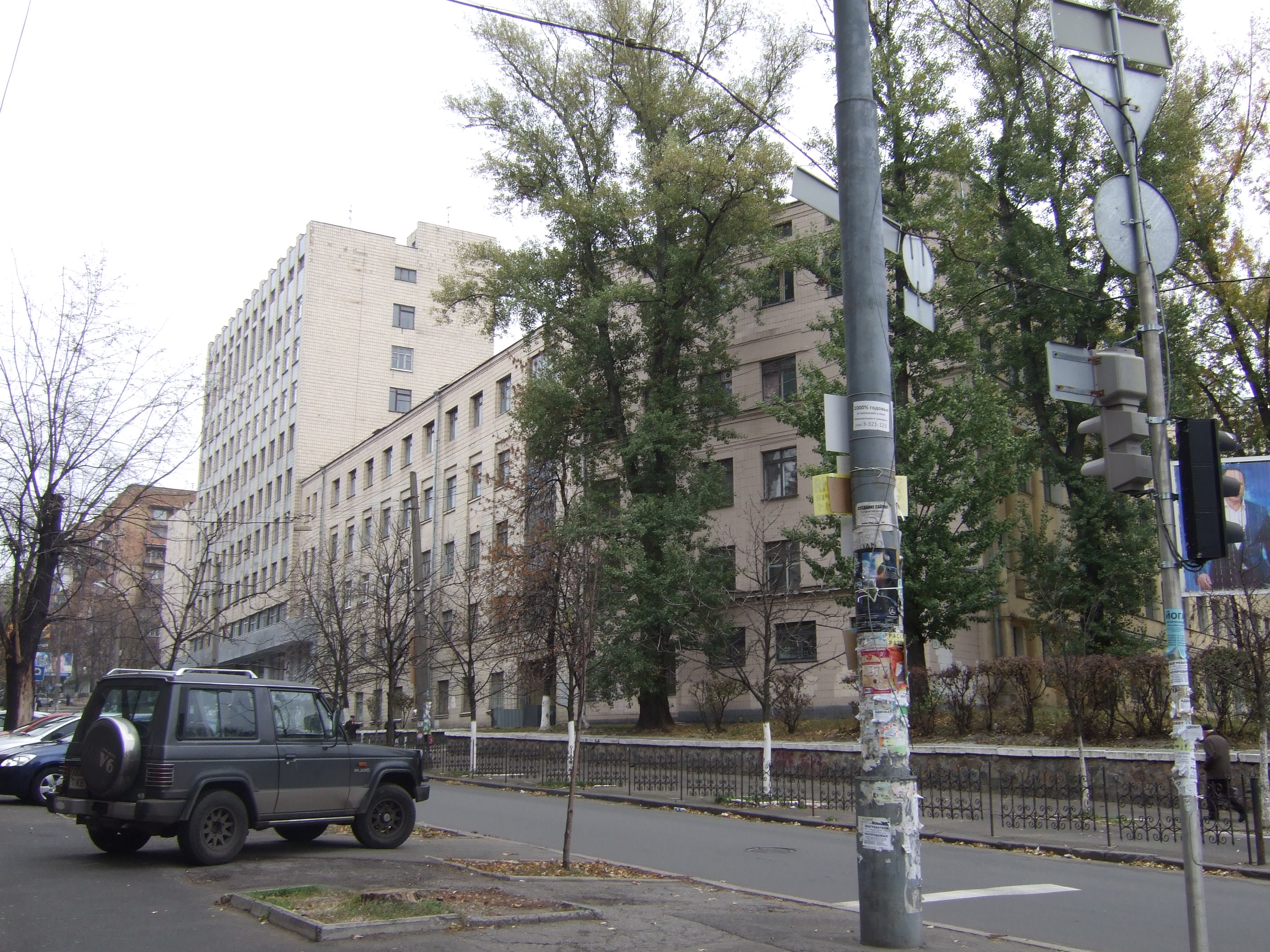
Campus 1

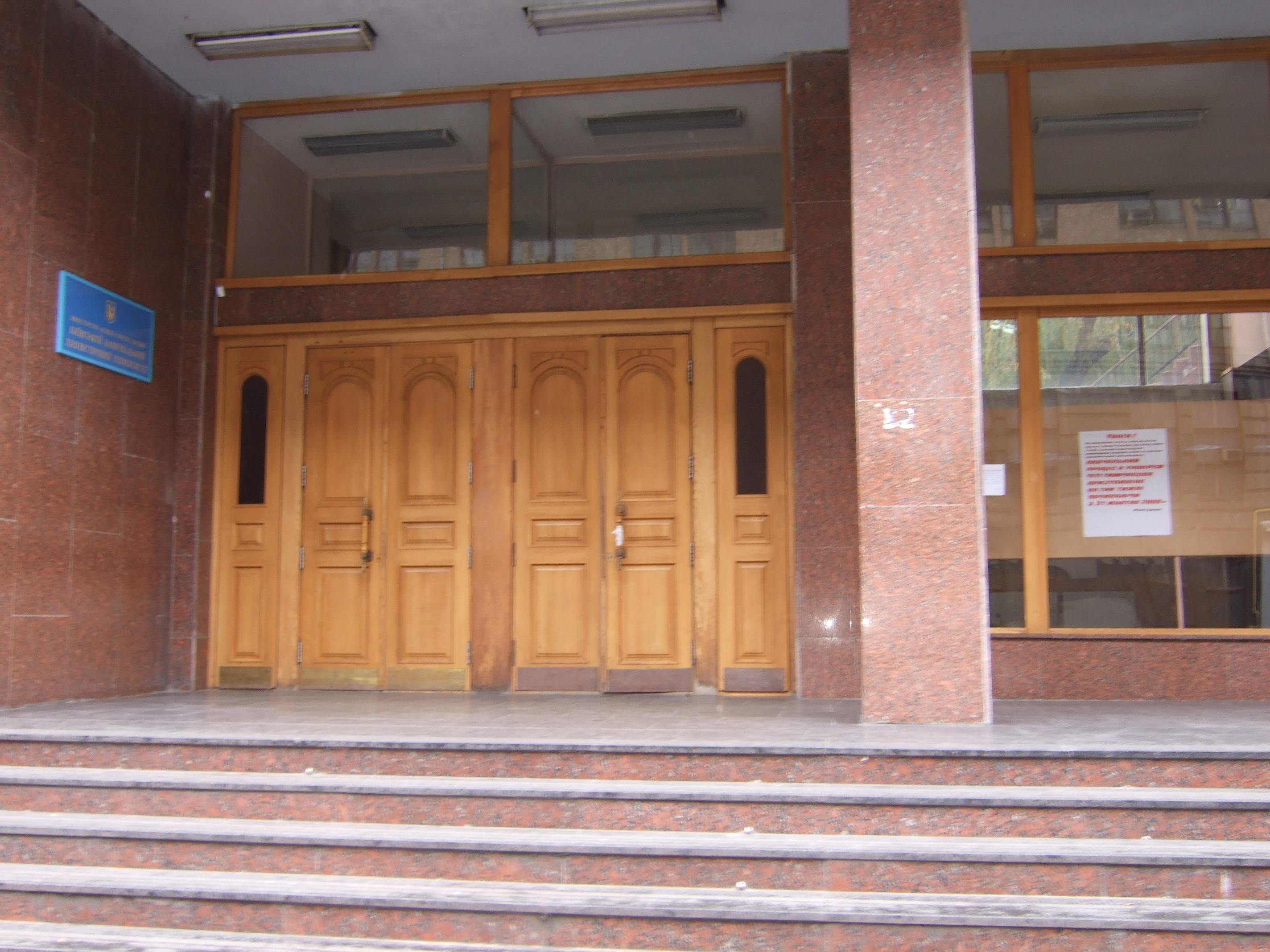
Central entrance

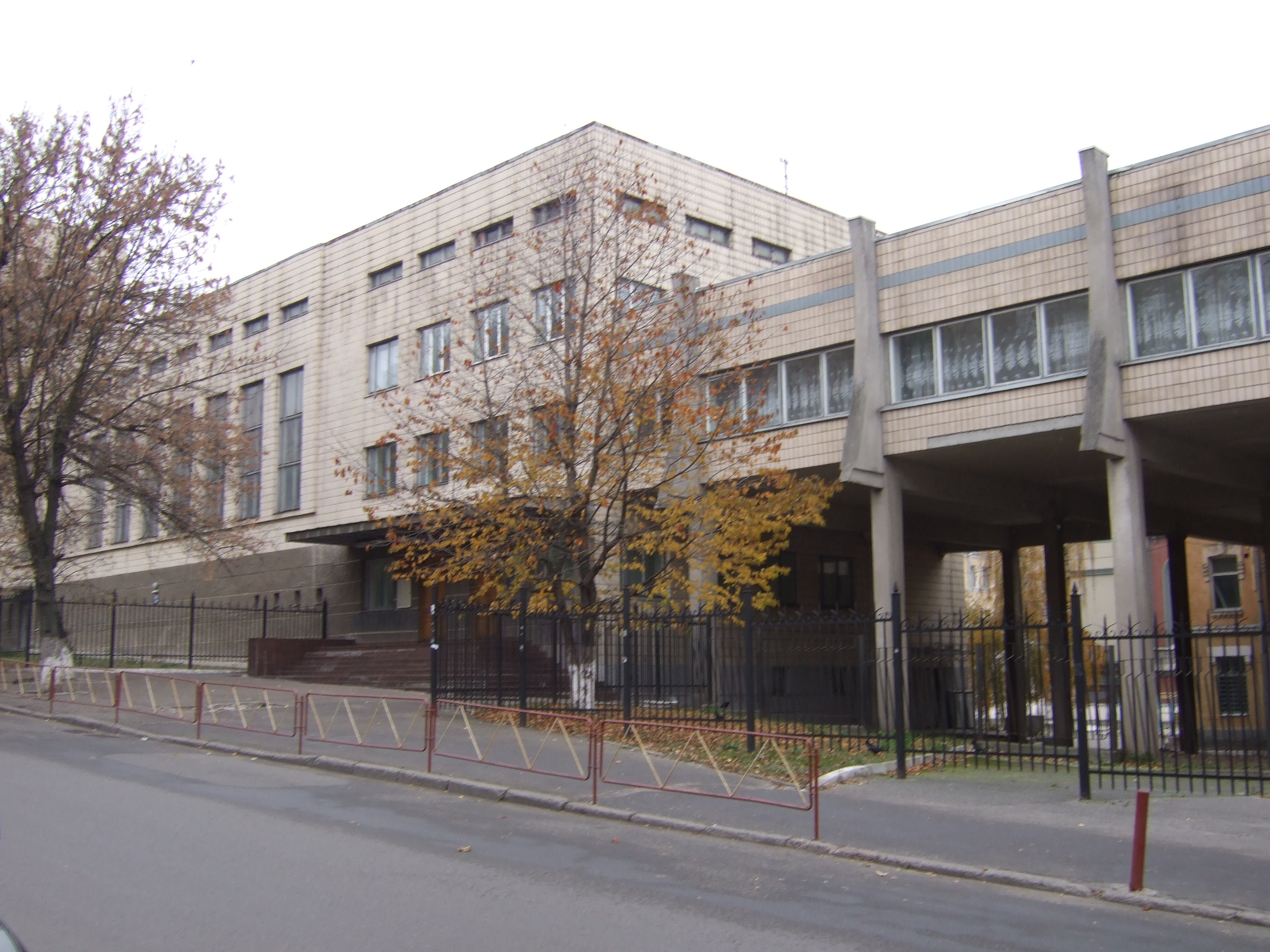
Canteen

== See also ==
List of universities in Ukraine
