= Tamara Trunova =

Ukrainian theatre director

Tamara Viktorovna Trunova (born May 5, 1982) is a Ukrainian theater director, the Chief Director of the Kyiv Academic Theatre of Drama and Comedy on the left bank of Dnieper.

== Biography ==
Trunova was born in Nova Kakhovka, Kherson Oblast.

She graduated from high school with a gold medal. Trunova graduated as a translator from the Kyiv National Linguistic University (1999-2004). She studied directing at the Kyiv National I. K. Karpenko-Kary Theatre, Cinema and Television University (directing department, course of Eduard Mitnitsky), from which she graduated in 2009. In the period from 2008 to 2013, she taught at the directing course of Eduard Mitnitsky. Since 2018, Trunova is the artistic director of the correspondence directing course of the Kyiv National I. K. Karpenko-Kary Theatre, Cinema and Television University.

Since 2011, she has been working at the Drama and Comedy Theater on the left bank of the Dnieper. Among her accomplishments are productions in theaters in Kyiv and across Ukraine. She works as a member of the jury at Ukrainian and international festivals (i.e. British Edinburgh Fringe 2016). She is also a participant and theatrical competition winner, for example, her theatrical program "Taking the Stage" at the British Council in Ukraine.

Since April 12, 2019, Trunova has been the Chief Director of the Kyiv Academic Theatre of Drama and Comedy on the left bank of the Dnieper.

She has a daughter, Sonya. Trunova lives and works in Kyiv.

== Creative biography ==
Director's works

Tamara Trunova's creative directorial heritage includes more than 20 productions in Ukraine and abroad.
