= Natalia Chaban =

Ukrainian professor of communication

Natalia Chaban FRSNZ
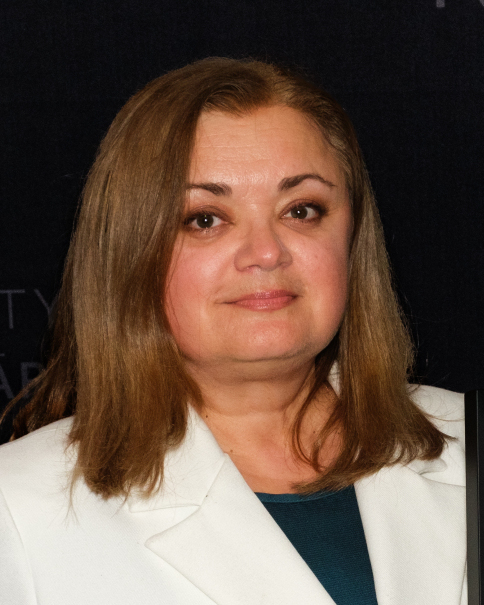
- Chaban in 2024
- Born: 1971 (age 54–55)
- Awards: Mason Durie Medal, Fellow of the Royal Society Te Apārangi

Academic background
- Education: Cherkasy National University, New York University, Kyiv National Linguistic University

Academic work
- Institutions: University of Canterbury, University of Maryland, Lund University

Natalia Chaban FRSNZ (born 04.10.1971) is a Ukrainian–New Zealand media and communications academic, and is a full professor at the University of Canterbury, specialising in political and media discourse. She is the director of Canterbury's Public Diplomacy and Political Communication Forum and has twice been awarded a Jean Monnet Chair. In 2024, Chaban was awarded the Mason Durie Medal by the Royal Society Te Apārangi.

== Academic career ==
Chaban completed a Bachelor of Arts in Germanic languages and literature at Cherkasy National University in Ukraine, followed by a Master of Arts degree in media studies and higher education administration at New York University. She then completed a PhD in linguistics at the Kyiv National Linguistic University. Chaban held research and teaching positions at Cherkasy State University, Lund University, and the University of Maryland at College Park. In 2002, Chaban joined the faculty of the Department of Media and Communication at the University of Canterbury in New Zealand, rising to full professor. She is the director of the Public Diplomacy and Political Communication Forum at Canterbury.

Chaban was a visiting research fellow at the Institute of Advanced Studies at the University of Bologna in Italy in 2022 and at Vytautas Magnus University, Lithuania. Chaban has twice been awarded a Jean Monnet Chair, an Erasmus programme designed to deepen access to European Union studies throughout universities. Chaban is interested in political and public communication and leads research on public diplomacy in the EU, academic knowledge production relating to the Russian invasion of Ukraine, and communication pedagogy.

Chaban is president of the Ukrainian Studies Association of Australia and New Zealand. Chaban was a founding co-editor of the Australian and New Zealand Journal of European Studies.

In November 2024, Chaban was awarded the Mason Durie Medal by the Royal Society Te Apārangi, for "her innovative research into perceptions in international relations and public diplomacy, most recently about the war against Ukraine". In 2026 Chaban was elected a Fellow of the Royal Society Te Apārangi.

== Selected books ==
- Chaban, Natalia; Elgström, Ole (2021). The Ukraine crisis and EU Foreign Policy Roles: Images of the EU in the Context of EU-Ukraine Relations. doi:10.4337/9781789907537. ISBN 978-1-78990-753-7.
- Bilateral Energy Relations between the EU and Emerging Powers: Mutual Perceptions of the EU and Brazil, China, India and South Africa. doi:10.5771/9783845262598-1.
- Europe and Asia:Perceptions From Afar. Bloomsbury. 26 March 2015. ISBN 9781474225038.
- National Centre for Research on Europe (NCRE) Research Series no. 4: The EU Through the Eyes of the Asia-Pacific: Public Perceptions and Media Representations.
- The Peace Corps Teaching English as a Foreign Language Training Book. Part II: Lesson Planning.
- The Peace Corps Teaching English as a Foreign Language Training Book. Part III: Those Ten Minutes Left.
- The Peace Corps Teaching English as a Foreign Language Training Book. Part I. US Peace Corps in Ukraine.
