= Kyiv Academic Theatre of Drama and Comedy on the left bank of Dnieper =

Theatre in Kyiv

Coordinates: 50°27′11.99″N 30°35′58.01″E

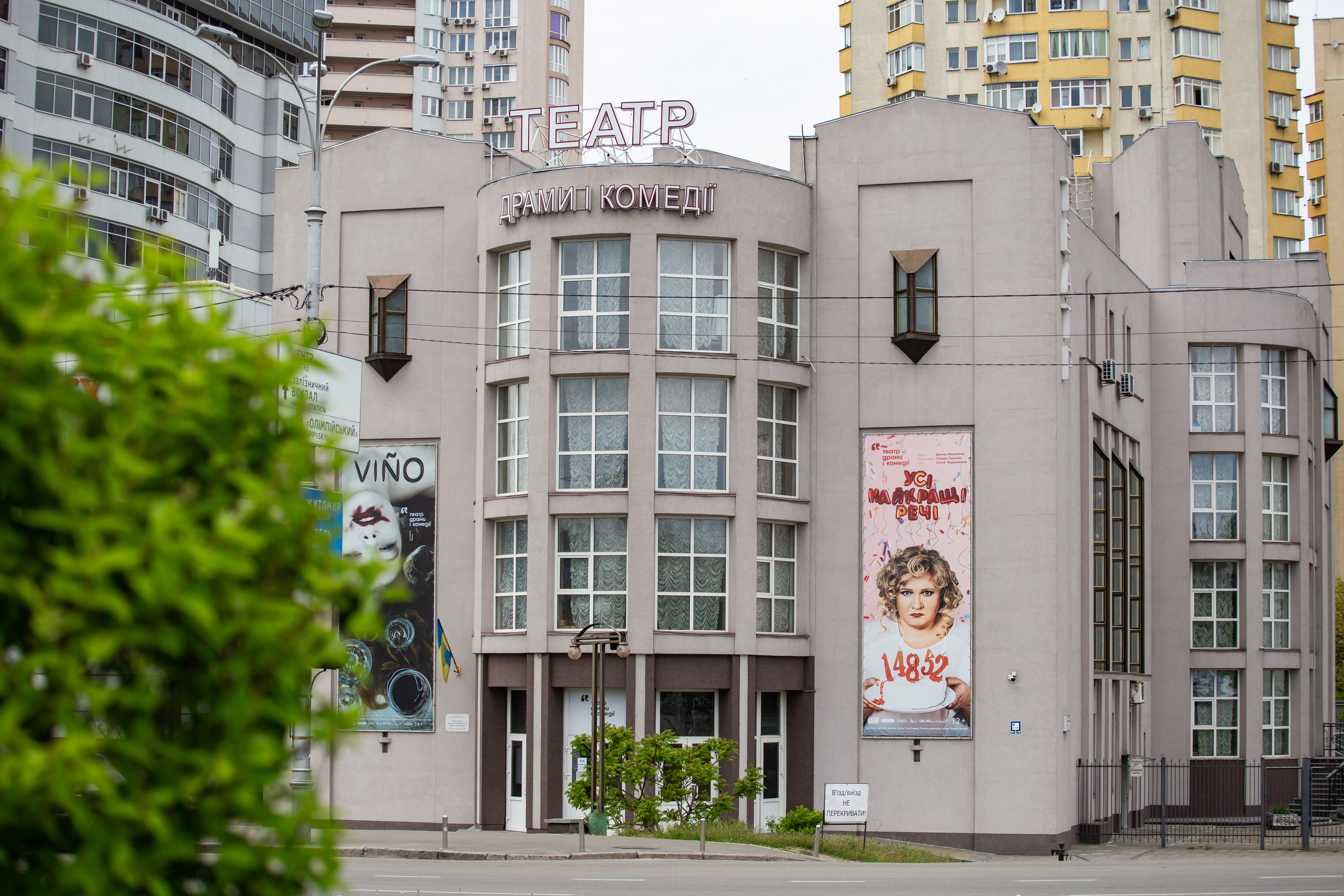

The Kyiv State Drama and Comedy Theatre on left bank of Dnipro river (Ukrainian: Київський академічний театр драми і комедії на лівому березі Дніпра) is a theatre in Kyiv in Ukraine. The Kyiv State Drama and Comedy Theater on the Left Bank (Left Bank Theater) - the first theater on the left bank of Kyiv - was born on September 7, 1978.

The first troupe gathering was held on this day. And the first premiere - the play "The Highest Point - Love" by R. Fedyenov - was held on April 21, 1979. A play by Vladimir Vinnichenko in 1992 became the first Ukrainian performance at the Russian-speaking theater.

In May 1982, the City Hall gave the team and head Eduard Mytnyckyi the building, which housed the Cosmos Cinema up to that point. Initially, within its walls was created "Theater in the lobby" - the first small stage in Kyiv and Ukraine.

In the first 15 years of its existence, the theater embodied the actual, topical drama. The theater changed its direction and began to focus attention on classical works in the 1990s.

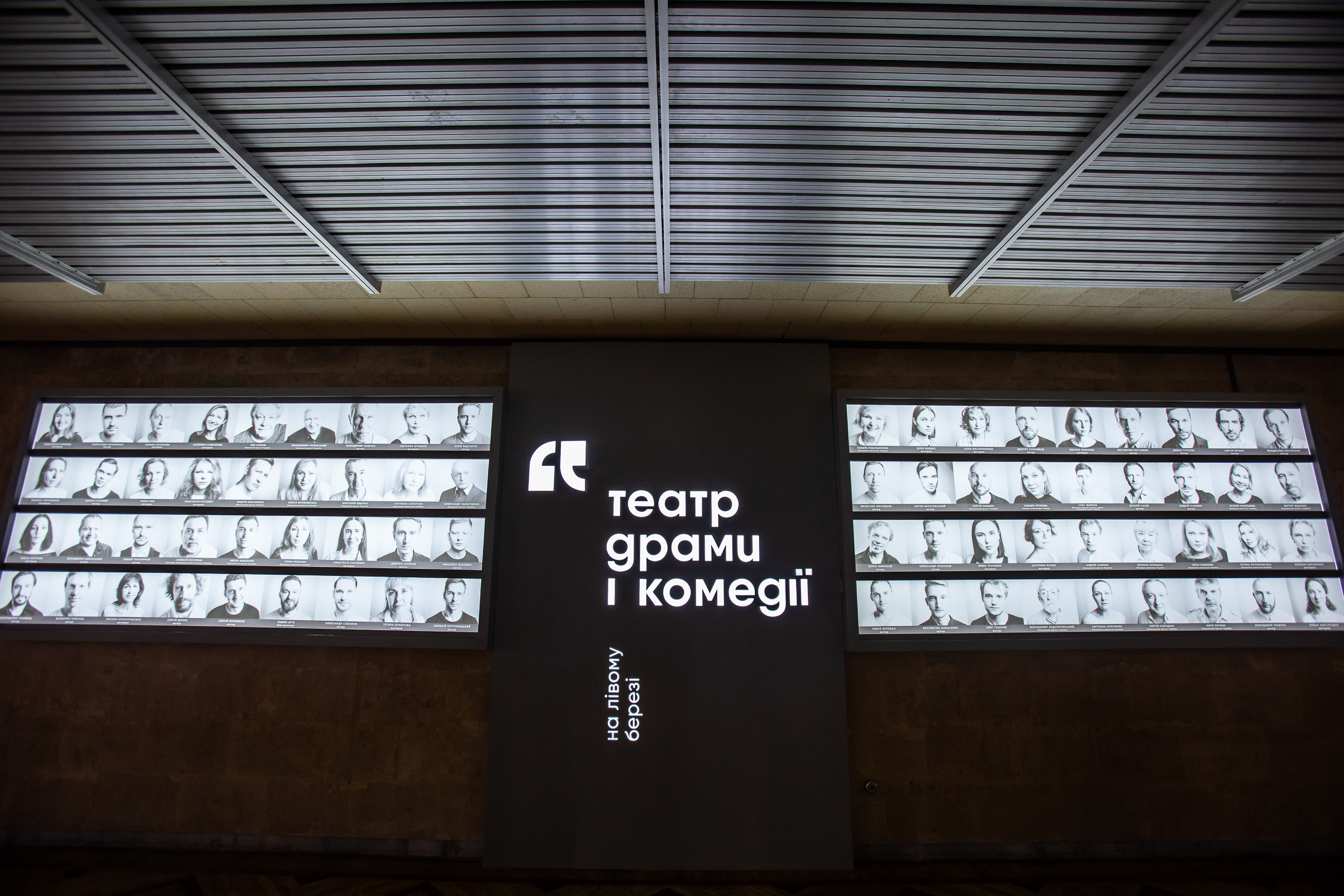

On January 18, 2019, Stas Zhyrkov and Tamara Trunova became theater directors. The new team began the process of reformation and upgrading. Theater left in the repertoire classical drama performances, and start to supplement performances of original, actual texts on acute-social topics. Today, Left Bank Theater has more than 50 performances in the repertoire, including physical theatre and modern comedy del arte play.

The Kyiv State Drama and Comedy Theater on the Left Bank toured in Georgia, Belarus, Latvia, Lithuania, Germany, Poland; always has participated in international theatrical festivals and has become one of the best Ukrainian theater for 40 years of history.

== See also ==
- Tamara Trunova
