= Star Academy =

Pop music talent contest franchise

- Created by: John de Mol Jr.; Tim van Rongen
- Original work: Starmaker (the Netherlands)
- Owner: Banijay Entertainment
- Years: 2001–present

Star Academy (also known as Starmaker) is a Dutch-developed reality television talent show format. It first aired in the Netherlands as Starmaker in 2001 and has since been spun into over 30 global franchises across Europe, Asia, South America, and Africa.

== Format ==
There are many versions of the show, each country having its own slight variations, but the basic concept remains the same: contestants live in a boarding-school called "The Academy", managed by a director, and various teachers coach them in several artistic disciplines. The participants are filmed with cameras throughout the day and night (an idea borrowed from another of Endemol's major reality shows Big Brother). Once a week, the contestants have to face a prime time show, where they sing the song they've prepared during the week before, as well as recapping their trials and tribulations at The Academy from the past week. The live show will often feature special guest stars, with whom some of the contestants have the opportunity to sing. Based on the judges' verdicts and viewer voting, the weakest contestant is dropped. The eventual winner is awarded a record deal and usually some amount of money.

== History ==
Location of different versions of Star Academy Own version Joint version

The public entity RTVE participated with Gestmusic, a Spanish branch of Endemol, in the development of a music program in 2001. The objective was to promote three musical careers and to find the new representative of Spain in the Eurovision Song Contest. After carrying out a series of auditions for thousands of people throughout Spain, on 22 October 2001, the first Operación Triunfo season began airing on Spanish television channel, La 1. A total of 16 contestants were candidates for the prize. Although production company Gestmusic created the format, Star Academy first premiered in France on 20 October 2001, two days before Operación Triunfo began airing in Spain.

Star Academy has reached markets as different as India, the Arab World and the United States, becoming the first Spanish format ever acquired by these countries. This show is similar to the Idols franchise, but different in that it also shows the contestants' lives together in the "Academy" where they are trained; American Idol shows nothing of the contestants' personalities or relationships with each other. Star Academy is in essence a singing competition, where the lowest vote-receiver each week must leave the show, ending finally when only one person remains.

In 2009, the Georgian local version of the show was cancelled mid-season as a result of their Academy building collapsing. Two on-site technical staff members died in the collapse in the early morning of 26 April 2009. Several contestants were brought to hospital following the disaster, but none of them were in danger. Rustavi 2 subsequently axed the series.

In 2011, most Star Academy series outside of Africa and the Middle East were phased out in favor of another musical competition format from Endemol, The Voice. In Europe, many of the series were cancelled as a result of lower ratings and high production costs. In 2017, the series was revived in Spain after six years of absence and Russia after an absence of ten years. Although the Spanish series became a ratings success, the Russian revival became a ratings flop and was not renewed in 2018.

During the first months of the COVID-19 pandemic in 2020, Spain was the only country in the world that was producing a season of the show. The contestants were aware of the developments with regards to the pandemic, which led to the show being eventually paused for several months with the contestants sent home.

== Star Academy around the world ==
There were more than 30 franchises of Star Academy all around the world, with 103 winners. As of 2020, only the Spanish version is still in production. The French-Canadian adaptation (based on the French version) returned in winter 2021.

Franchise with a currently airing season
Franchise awaiting confirmation
Franchise with an unknown status
Franchise with an upcoming season
Franchise no longer in production

Region	Local name	Channel	Winner	Main Presenters
African; Countries	Project Fame; Website	M-Net; DStv (Live); The Africa Channel (Broadcast in 2008)	Season 1, 2004: Lindiwe Alam	James Alexander; Vusi Twala
Arab Maghreb	Star Academy Maghreb; Website	Nessma TV	Season 1, 2007: Hajar Adnane	Nabila El Kilani
(Arab League) Arab world	Star Academy Arabia; Website; Website; Website	LBCI; CBC (starting season 9)	Season 1, 2003–2004: Mohamed Attia; Season 2, 2004–2005: Hisham Abdulrahman; Season 3, 2005–2006: Joseph Attieh; Season 4, 2006–2007: Shatha Hassoun; Season 5, 2008: Nader Guirat; Season 6, 2009: Abdulaziz Abdulrahman; Season 7, 2010: Nassif Zeytoun; Season 8, 2011: Nessma Alaa Mahgoub; Season 9, 2013–2014: Mahmoud Mohey; Season 10, 2014: Mohamed Chahine; Season 11, 2015–2016: Marwan Youssef	Hilda Khalife
Argentina	Operación Triunfo; Website; Website; Website	Telefe; Canal 4 DirecTV (Live) (Season 4)	Season 1, 2003: Claudio Basso; Season 2, 2004–2005: José García; Season 3, 2005–2006: Benjamín Rosales; Season 4, 2009: Cristian Manuel Soloa; Season 5, 2012–2013: F.A.N.S.	Alejandro Wiebe, "Marley" (Season 1–4); Germán Paoloski (Season 5)
Belgium	Star Academy (Dutch); Website; Website	Kanaal Twee	Season 1, 2005: Katerine Avgoustakis	Walter Grootaers
Belgium	Star Academy (French); Website	RTL-TVI	Season 1, 2002: Mélanie Martin's	Virginie Efira & Frédéric Hebrays
Bolivia	La Fábrica de Estrellas - Star Academy; Website	Red Unitel	Season 1, 2016: David Soliz; Season 2, 2016: Vania Taborga	Anabel Angus; Angélica Mérida
Brazil	Fama; Website; Website	Rede Globo; SKY (Live)	Season 1, 2002: Vanessa Jackson; Season 2, 2003: Marcus Vinícius; Season 3, 2004: Tiago Silva; Season 4, 2005: Fabio Souza	Angélica Ksyvickis (Season 1–4); Toni Garrido (Season 1-2)
Bulgaria	Star Academy; Website	Nova Television; Nova+ (Live); CableTel (Live)	Season 1, 2005: Marin Yonchev	Maria Ilieva
Canada	Star Académie; Website	TVA	Season 1, 2003: Wilfred Le Bouthillier; Season 2, 2004: Stéphanie Lapointe; Season 3, 2005: Marc-André Fortin; Season 4, 2009: Maxime Landry; Season 5, 2012: Jean-Marc Couture; Season 6, 2021: William Cloutier; Season 7, 2022: Krystel Mongeau; Season 8, 2025: Mia Tinayre	Julie Snyder (Season 1–5); Patrice Michaud (Season 6); Marc Dupré (Season 7); Jean-Philippe Dion (Season 8)
Chile	Operación Triunfo; Website	Mega	Season 1, 2003: Mónica Rodríguez	Álvaro Escobar
East Africa	Tusker Project Fame; Website; Website	M-Net (Africa) (Season 1); NTV (Season 1); Citizen TV (Season 2–5); RTNB (Season 5); Channel 10 (Season 1); StarTV (Season 2–3, 5) TBC (Season 4); UBC (Season 1, 4); WBS (Season 2–3); NTV (Season 5); Rwanda TV (Season 3–5); SSTV (Season 4); Channel 146 (Season 5)	Season 1, 2006: Valerie Kimani; Season 2, 2008: Esther Nabaasa Mugizi; Season 3, 2009: Alpha Rwirangira; Season 4, 2010: Davis Hillary Ntare; Season 5, 2012: Ruth Matete	Gaetano Kagwa (Season 1); Fumnilayo Raimi (Season 2); Mich Egwang (Season 3–5); Sheila Mwanyigah (Season 3–5)
East Africa	Tusker All-Stars (All-Stars Format)	M-Net (Africa) (Season 1); NTV (Season 1); Citizen TV (Season 2–5); RTNB (Season 5); Channel 10 (Season 1); StarTV (Season 2–3, 5) TBC (Season 4); UBC (Season 1, 4); WBS (Season 2–3); NTV (Season 5); Rwanda TV (Season 3–5); SSTV (Season 4); Channel 146 (Season 5)	Season 1, 2011: Davis Ntare, Peter Msechu & Alpha Rwirangira	Gaetano Kagwa; Eve D'Souza
France	Star Academy; Website; Website; Website	TF1 (Season 1–8, 10-); NRJ 12 (Season 9)	Season 1, 2001–2002: Jenifer Bartoli; Season 2, 2002: Nolwenn Leroy; Season 3, 2003: Élodie Frégé; Season 4, 2004: Grégory Lemarchal; Season 5, 2005: Magalie Vaé; Season 6, 2006: Cyril Cinélu; Season 7, 2007–2008: Quentin Mosimann; Season 8, 2008: Mickels Réa; Season 9, 2012–2013: Laurène Bourvon; Season 10, 2022: Anisha Jo; Season 11, 2023–2024: Pierre Garnier; Season 12, 2024–2025: Marine Delplace; Season 13, 2025–2026: Ambre Berger; Season 14, 2026: Current season	Nikos Aliagas (Season 1–8, 10-); Karima Charni (Season 10-); Mathieu Delormeau (Season 9); Tonya Kinzinger (Season 9)
Georgia	ვარსკვლავების აკადემია Varskvlavebis Akademia; Website	Rustavi 2	Season 1, 2008: Dito Lagvilava; Season 2, 2009: Cancelled	Sopho Khalvashi; Giorgi Qorqia
Germany	Fame Academy; Website	RTL II; Tele 5 MTV2 Pop	Season 1, 2003–2004: Become One	Nova Meierhenrich
Greece / Cyprus	Fame Story; Website	ANT1	Season 1, 2002: Notis Christodoulou; Season 2, 2004: Kalomira; Season 3, 2004–2005: Pericles Stergianoudes; Season 4, 2006: Leonidas Balafas	Natalia Germanou (1); Andreas Mikroutsikos (2); Tatiana Stefanidou (3); Sophia Aliberti (4)
Greece / Cyprus	Fame Story; Website	Star Channel (Cyprus) Omega TV	Season 5, 2023: Anna Poltzoglou	Nikos Koklonis
Greece / Cyprus	Star Academy - Super Star Academy; Website	Epsilon TV; Plus Channel Cyprus	Season 1, 2017: Christina Ksirokosta	Menios Fourthiotis
Hungary	Star Academy Magyaroszág; Website	TV2	Season 1, 2016: Renáta Szőcs	Majka; Nóra Ördög
India	Fame Gurukul; Website	SET India	Season 1, 2005: Qazi Touqeer & Ruprekha Banerjee	Mandira Bedi (Season 1-Celebrity); Manav Gohil (Season 1-Celebrity); Sophie Choudry (Season 2); Shilpa Sakhlani (Season 2)
India	Celebrity Fame Gurukul (Celebrity Format); Website	SET India	Season 1, 2005: Amit Sareen	Mandira Bedi (Season 1-Celebrity); Manav Gohil (Season 1-Celebrity); Sophie Choudry (Season 2); Shilpa Sakhlani (Season 2)
India	Fame X Chal Udiye; Website	SAB TV	Season 2, 2006–2007: Rehan Khan	Mandira Bedi (Season 1-Celebrity); Manav Gohil (Season 1-Celebrity); Sophie Choudry (Season 2); Shilpa Sakhlani (Season 2)
Italy	Operazione Trionfo; Website	Italia 1	Season 1, 2002: Bruno Cuomo	Miguel Bosé
Italy	Star Academy; Website	Rai 2	Season 1, 2011: Cancelled	Francesco Facchinetti
Kazakhstan	Жұлдыздар фабрикасы Juldizdar Fabrikasi; Website	TV7	Season 1, 2011: Alisher Egemberdiev	Adil Liyan; Taya Katyusha
Mexico	Operación Triunfo; Website	Televisa (Live)	Season 1, 2002: Darina Márquez	Jaime Camil
Mongolia	Оддын академи Oddin akademi	Edutainment TV	Season 1, 2017: The Wasabies	Batbileg Batts; Dashdavaa Amartuvshin
Netherlands	Starmaker; Website	Yorin	Season 1, 2001: K-otic	Gijs Staverman
Netherlands	Star Academy; Website	Yorin	Season 2, 2002: Cancelled	Danny Rook
Peru	Operación Triunfo; Website	América Televisión	Season 1, 2012: Mayra Alejandra Goñi	Gisela Valcárcel
Philippines	Pinoy Dream Academy; Website	ABS-CBN; Studio 23	Season 1, 2006: Yeng Constantino; Season 2, 2008: Laarni Lozada	Nikki Gil (Season 1–2); Toni Gonzaga (Season 1–2); Bianca Gonzalez (Season 1); Sam Milby (Season 1); Roxanne Barcelo (Season 1); Billy Crawford (Season 2)
Philippines	Pinoy Dream Academy: Little Dreamers (Kids Format)	ABS-CBN; Studio 23	Season 1, 2008: Philip Nolasco	Nikki Gil (Season 1–2); Toni Gonzaga (Season 1–2); Bianca Gonzalez (Season 1); Sam Milby (Season 1); Roxanne Barcelo (Season 1); Billy Crawford (Season 2)
Poland	Fabryka Gwiazd; Website	Polsat	Season 1, 2008: Martyna Melosik	Maciej Rock
Portugal	Academia de Estrelas; Website; Website	TVI	Season 1, 2002–03: Mané Crestejo	Teresa Guilherme
Portugal	Academia de Famosos (Celebrity Format); Website; Website	TVI	Season 1, 2003: Romana	Paulo Pires; Fernanda Serrano
Portugal	Operação Triunfo; Website; Website; Website	RTP	Season 1, 2003: Sofia Barbosa; Season 2, 2003–04: Sofia Vitória; Season 3, 2007–08: Vânia Fernandes; Season 4, 2010–11: Jorge Roque	Catarina Furtado (Seasons 1–2); Sílvia Alberto (Seasons 3–4)
Romania Moldova	Star Factory România; Website	Prima TV	Season 1, 2003–2004: Alex Velea	Laura Iordache; Virgil Ianțu
Romania Moldova	Fabrica de staruri Website; Website	Prime TV; 2 Plus; TVR 1 (Season 3)	Season 1, 2008–2009: Alexandru Manciu; Season 2, 2010: Alexandru Belenki; Season 3, 2012: Alexandru Mațaev	Andreea Raicu (Season 1); Dan Negru (Season 2); Marius Vizante (Season 3)
Russia	Фабрика звёзд Fabrika zvyozd Website	Channel One	Season 1, 2002: Pasha Artemyev; Season 2, 2003: Polina Gagarina; Season 3, 2003: Nikita Malinin; Season 4, 2004: Irina Dubtsova; Season 5, 2004: Victoria Dayneko; Season 6, 2006: Dmitry Koldun; Season 7, 2007: Anastasiya Prikhodko	Yana Churikova
Russia	Фабрика звёзд. Возвращение; Fabrika Zvyozd. Vozvrachtcheniè (All-Stars Format); Website	Channel One	Season 1, 2011: Victoria Dayneko	Yana Churikova
Russia	Фабрика звёзд. Россия-Украина; Fabrika Zvyozd. Rossiya-Ukrayina (All-Stars Format); Website; Website	Channel One; Novyi Kanal	Season 1, 2012: Russia	Yana Churikova; Dmitry Shepelyov
Russia	Новая Фабрика звёзд Novaya Fabrika zvyozd Website	Muz-TV (Season 1); TNT (Season 2)	Season 1, 2017: Guzel Hasanova; Season 2, 2024: Maria Gordeeva	Ksenia Sobchak (Season 1); Regina Todorenko; Timur Rodriguez (Season 2)
Spain	Operación Triunfo; Website; Website; Website	La 1 (Seasons 1–3, 9–11); Telecinco (Seasons 4–8); Amazon Prime Video (Season 12–)	Season 1, 2001–2002: Rosa López; Season 2, 2002–2003: Ainhoa Cantalapiedra; Season 3, 2003–2004: Vicente Seguí; Season 4, 2005: Sergio Rivero; Season 5, 2006–2007: Lorena Gómez; Season 6, 2008: Virginia Maestro; Season 7, 2009: Mario Álvarez; Season 8, 2011: Nahuel Sachak; Season 9, 2017–2018: Amaia Romero; Season 10, 2018: Famous Oberogo; Season 11, 2020: Nia Correia; Season 12, 2023–2024: Naiara Moreno; Season 13, 2025: Cristina Lora; Season 14, 2027: Upcoming season	Carlos Lozano (Season 1–3); Jesús Vázquez (Season 4–7); Pilar Rubio (Season 8); Roberto Leal (Season 9–11); Chenoa (Season 12–)
Turkey	Akademi Türkiye; Website	ATV	Season 1, 2004: Barış Akarsu	Öykü Serter
Turkey	Anadolu Rüzgarı; Website	TGRT	Season 2, 2005: Nesil	Öykü Serter
Turkey	Star Akademi Türkiye; Website	Kanal 1	Season 3, 2008: Bahadır Sağlam	Öykü Serter
Turkey	Star Akademi; Website	Star TV	Season 4, 2011: Giray Songül	Öykü Serter
Ukraine	Фабрика зірок Fabrika zirok tv/ua-en/series/37883-fabrika-zirok Website	Novyi Kanal (Seasons 1-4); Sweet.tv (Seasons 5-)	Season 1, 2007–2008: Olha Tsybulska & Oleksandr Bodianskyi; Season 2, 2008: Volodymyr Dantes & Vadym Oliinyk; Season 3, 2009: Stas Shurins; Season 4, 2011: Yulia Rudneva; Season 5, 2026: Povin'; Season 6, 2027: Upcoming season	Andriy Domansky (Season 1, 3); Dmitry Shepelev (Season 2); Vasilisa Frolova (Season 1); Masha Efrosinina (Season 3); Olexandr Pedan (Season 4); Erika (Season 4); Volodymyr Dantes (Season 5); Dasha Kubik (Season 5)
Ukraine	Фабрика Суперфiнал; Fabrika Superfinal (All-Stars Format)	Novyi Kanal	Season 1, 2010: Oleksiy Matias	Andriy Domansky; Masha Efrosinina
United Kingdom	Fame Academy; Website	BBC One; BBC Three	Season 1, 2002: David Sneddon; Season 2, 2003: Alex Parks	Cat Deeley; Patrick Kielty
United Kingdom	Comic Relief Does Fame Academy (Celebrity Format)	BBC One; BBC Three	Season 1, 2003: Will Mellor; Season 2, 2005: Edith Bowman; Season 3, 2007: Tara Palmer-Tomkinson	Cat Deeley (Seasons 1–2); Patrick Kielty (Seasons 1–3); Claudia Winkleman (Season 3)
United Kingdom	Fame Academy Bursary	BBC One; BBC Three	Season 1, 2003: Vishal Gopal; Season 2, 2003: Shona Kipling; Season 3, 2003: Daniel Allinson; Season 4, 2003: Daniel Powell; Season 5, 2003: David Rimbault	—N/a
United States (English)	The One: Making a Music Star; Website; Website	ABC; CBC	Season 1, 2006: Cancelled	George Stroumboulopoulos
United States (Spanish)	Operación Triunfo; Website	Telemundo	Season 1, 2026: Wandy Santana	Natalia Téllez
Vietnam	Star Academy: Ngôi nhà âm nhạc Website	HTV	Season 1, 2012: Phạm Quốc Huy	Yến Trang; Tuấn Tú
Vietnam	Star Academy Vietnam: Học viện ngôi sao Website	VTV	Season 1, 2014: Hoà Nguyễn (Hoà Minzy); Season 2, 2015: Nguyễn Ngọc Thảo Nhi	Dustin Nguyễn, Tú Linh (season 1) Mỹ Trâm, Cao Thanh Thảo My (season 2)
West Africa	Project Fame West Africa; Website	TV3 (Season 1–3); Metro TV (Season 4–present); Clare TV (Season 1–3, 5–present); SKY TV (Season 4); AIT (Season 1–5); GET TV (Season 5–present); MiTV; NTA; Nigerzie; ONTV; Silverbird; SoundCity; ABC TV (Season 1–3); SLBC (Season 4–5)	Season 1, 2008: Iyanya Mbuk; Season 2, 2009: Mike Anyasodo; Season 3, 2010: Chidinma Ekile; Season 4, 2011: Monica Ogah; Season 5, 2012: Ayobami Ayoola; Season 6, 2013: Olawale Ayodele; Season 7, 2014: Geoffrey Oji; Season 8, 2015: Jeffery Akor; Season 9, 2016: Okiemute Ighorodje	Dare Art Alade (Season 1); Funlola Raimi (Season 1); Joseph Benjamin (Season 2-9); Adaora Oleh (Season 2–6); Bolanle Olukanni (Season 7-9)
(Bosnia and Herzegovina) (Croatia) (North Macedonia) (Montenegro) (Serbia); Western Balkans	Операција триумф Operacija Trijumf; Website; Website; Website; Website	B92; Nova TV; TV In; FTV/RTRS; A1 TV	Season 1, 2008–2009: Adnan Babajić	Ana Mihajlovski; Nikolina Pišek; Milan Kalinić; Maca Marinković

== Star Academy hymns, official themes ==
Region	Local name	Hymn
Arab Maghreb	Star Academy Maghreb; Website	Lili Twil (Long nights)
Argentina	Operación Triunfo; Website	Season 1-3: Canta (Sing)
Belgium	Star Academy Flanders (Dutch); Website	Fame
Belgium	Star Academy Wallonia (French); Website	Star
Brazil	FAMA; Website	Season 1: Dom Verdadeiro (True Gift)
Bulgaria	Star Academy; Website	Fame
Canada	Star Académie; Website	Season 1: Et c'est pas fini (And it's not over); Season 2: Un nouveau jour va se lever (A new day will dawn); Season 3: L’étoile d’Amérique (The Star of America); Season 4: 1000 cœurs debout (1000 hearts standing); Season 5: Toi + moi (You + me); Season 6: Maintenant et partout (Now and everywhere); Season 7: Changer le monde (Change the world); Season 8: Ne partez pas sans moi (Don't Leave Without Me)
Chile	Operación Triunfo; Website	El cielo puedes alcanzar (You can reach the heaven)
East Africa	Tusker Project Fame; Website	
France	Star Academy; Website	Season 1: La Musique (The Music); Season 2: Paris Latino; Season 3: La Bamba; Season 4: Laissez-moi danser (Let me dance); Season 5: Je ne suis pas un héros (I am not a hero); Season 6: Porque te vas Season 7: Bangla Desh; Season 8: Chante; Season 9: Parce qu'on vient de loin (Because we come from far away); Season 10: Ne partez pas sans moi (Don't Leave Without Me); Season 11: Au bout de mes rêves (At the end of my dreams); Season 12: Recommence-moi (Start me over); Season 13: Voulez-Vous (Do you want?); Season 14: Dans un autre monde (In another world)
Germany	Fame Academy; Website	Fame So Wonderful
Greece	Fame Story	Season 1: You can be a star
Greece	Star Academy - Super Star Academy; Website	
Hungary	Star Academy Magyaroszág; Website	season 1: Élj együtt a zenével (Live with the music)
Mexico	Operación Triunfo; Website	Déjame Volar (Let me fly); Mi música es tu voz (My music is your voice)
Netherlands	Starmaker; Website	Miracles by Jessica Folker
Netherlands	Star Academy	"A Day Without You" [Main Mix] by Kristine Blond
Peru	Operación Triunfo; Website	Que cante tu corazón (Let your heart sing)
Philippines	Pinoy Dream Academy; Website	Pinoy Dream Academy (Theme)
Portugal	Academia de Estrelas; Website	Alma na voz (Soul in voice)
Portugal	Operação Triunfo; Website	Season 1: Acreditar (To Believe); Season 2: Sou quem eu quiser (I'm whoever I want)
Russia	Фабрика звёзд Fabrika zvyozd Website	Season 1-7: Круто ты попал на тв (Cool you got on tv)
Russia	Новая Фабрика звёзд Novaya Fabrika zvyozd Website	
Spain	Operación Triunfo; Website	Season 1: Mi música es tu voz (My music is your voice); Season 2: La fuerza de la vida (The force of life); Un segundo en el camino (A second on the road); Season 5: Adelante (Go ahead); Season 6: Agua (Water); Season 7: Te doy todo (I give you everything); Música (Music); Season 9: Camina (Walk); Season 10: Somos (We are); Season 11: Díselo a la vida (Tell it to life); Sal de mí (Get out of me); Season 12: Historias por contar (Stories to tell)
Ukraine	Фабрика зірок Fabrika Zirok; Website	Season 1: На випускний (For Graduation); Season 2: До завтра, мам! (See you tomorrow, Mom!); Season 3: Перший крок (First Step); Season 4: Життя прекрасне (Life is Beautiful); Season 5: Тисяча пісень (A Thousand Songs)
United States	The One: Making a Music Star; Website	
United States	Operación Triunfo; Website	Atrévete a Triunfar
West Africa	Project Fame West Africa; Website	
(Bosnia and Herzegovina) (Croatia) (North Macedonia) (Montenegro) (Serbia); Western Balkans	Операција триумф Operacija Trijumf; Website	Himna Akademije (Academy Hymn)

== Parodies of Star Academy ==
- Mexico: Aperración al Triunfo
- France: StarLoose Academy, Vedette de Star
- Greece: Super Star Academy

== Special concerts of Star Academy ==
=== Eurobest ===
Country	Contestant	Song	Score/Place
Spain	Chenoa (finalist of Operación Triunfo 1)	"It's Raining Men"	145 points Winner
Belgium	Mélanie Martin's	"Like a Prayer"	110 points, 7th
United Kingdom	Lemar (finalist of Fame Academy 1)	"With or Without You"	132 points, 3rd
Portugal	Mané Crestejo and Lília Matos	"Sussudio"	121 points. 4th
Greece	Notis Christodoulou	"1,2,3... Maria"	99 points, 9th
France	Nolwenn Leroy	"I Will Always Love You"	134 points, 2nd
Netherlands	Sita Vermeulen	"All I Wanna Do"	102 points, 8th
Russia	Korni	"We Will Rock You"	113 points, 6th
Italy	Bruno Cuomo	"Sorry Seems to Be the Hardest Word"	114 points, 5th

=== "Gala de los ganadores" (Winners gala) ===
Country	Contestant	Song	Score/Place
Spain	Ainhoa Cantalapiedra	"Sobreviviré"	No winners
Mexico	Darina Márquez	"Mujer contra mujer"	No winners
Brazil	Vanessa Jackson	"De volta pra mim"	No winners
Italy	Bruno Cuomo	"L'atmosfera"	No winners

=== Worldbest ===
Country	Contestant	Song	Score/Place
Spain	Miguel and Davinia (Operación Triunfo 3's finalists)	"As"	55 points, 7th
Argentina	Emanuel (finalist of Operación Triunfo 1)	"Feel"	64 points, 5th
United Kingdom	Alistair (Fame Academy 2's runner-up)	"Everything I do"	56 points, 6th
Brazil	Nalanda (finalist of FAMA 1)	"Whenever"	50 points, 8th
Chile	Mónica Rodríguez	"Lady marmalade"	70 points, 3rd
France	Elodie Frégé	"S'il suffisait d'aimer"	85 points, Winner
Lebanon	Bruno (Star Academy 1)	"The cup of life"	34 points, 10th
Russia	Yulia Savicheva (finalist of Fabrika Zvezd 2)	"Thorn"	46 points, 9th
Mexico	Darina Márquez	"Hero"	66 points, 4th
Canada	Wilfred Le Bouthillier and Marie-Elaine	"Turn around"	74 points, 2nd
Germany	Become One	"Fame"	19 points, 11th

== Curiosities of Star Academy ==
=== The Academy ===
The Operación Triunfo academy had a common area on a balcony with a piano and big windows, there was: In Spain it was called "the pub" In Mexico "the lounge" In Portugal In Turkey

=== The Stage ===
Some editions followed the spanish style where the stage had a catwalk. Some editions had a round platform that moved across the catwalk, some countries named the platform with funny names:

In Spain, called as "la pastilla" (the pill) In Mexico, called as "el queso" (the cheese) In Chile, called as "la galleta" (the cookie) In Argentina In Brazil In Bulgaria (only catwalk) In Philippines In Italy (only catwalk) In Greece (only catwalk) In Germany (only catwalk) In India (only catwalk) In Peru (only catwalk) In Poland (only catwalk) In Portugal In Romania (only catwalk) In Turkey (only catwalk) In United Kingdom In United States (only catwalk)

Some editions followed the spanish industrial-style stage, featuring scaffolding and blinds

In Spain In Mexico In Chile In Argentina In Brazil In Germany In Greece In India In Philippines In Portugal In Romania In Turkey In United Kingdom

== See also ==
- List of television show franchises
- La Academia
- American Idol
- Australian Idol
- Making the Band
