= Fabryka Zirok =

Ukrainian music television series

- Fabryka Zirok title card
- Ukrainian: Фабрика зірок
- Created by: John de Mol
- Presented by: Volodymyr Dantes; Dasha Kubyk
- Country of origin: Ukraine
- Original language: Ukrainian
- No. of series: 5

Production
- Production locations: Kyiv, Ukraine
- Camera setup: Multiple-camera setup
- Running time: Varies

Original release
- Network: Novyi Kanal; Sweet.tv
- Release: 7 October 2007 – present

Fabryka Zirok (Ukrainian: Фабрика зірок; Star Factory) is a Ukrainian reality television talent show that first aired on Novyi Kanal in 2007. The programme is the Ukrainian adaptation of the international Star Academy television format, originally developed by the Dutch production company Endemol. It combines a music competition with a reality television format, following aspiring singers as they develop their musical abilities and compete for public recognition.

During the competition, contestants live together and receive professional training in singing, dancing, stage performance and other aspects of the music industry. Their progress is documented throughout the season, culminating in weekly live broadcasts known as "prime shows", during which contestants perform before a live audience. Viewers participate in the competition by voting for their favourite performers, with contestants facing elimination as the season progresses.

The show became a major success in Ukraine and attracted a dedicated audience. Originally broadcast on Novyi Kanal, it returned in 2026 when streaming platform Sweet.tv acquired the rights to produce and broadcast its fifth season. The new season features contestants aged 16 and older from across Ukraine.

== Series overview ==
Series	Year	Winner	Runner-up	Third place	Fourth place	Fifth place	Sixth place	Host	Mentor	Network
1	2007	Olha Tsybulska; Oleksandr Bodianskyi	Khrystyna Kim	Vitalii Halai	Yuliia Borza	Dasha Astafieva	Yevhen Tolochnyi	Andriy Domanskiy; Vasylysa Frolova	Yurii Nikitin	Novyi Kanal
2	2008	Volodymyr Dantes; Vadym Oliinyk	Alisa Tarabarova	Borys Aprel	Vlad Darwin	Rehina Todorienko	Max Barskih	Dmitriy Shepelev	Natalia Mohylevska	Novyi Kanal
3	2009	Stas Shurins	Oleksii Matias	Kolya Serga	Borysenko Brothers	Yeva Bushmina	Erika	Andriy Domanskyi; Masha Efrosynina	Konstantin Meladze	Novyi Kanal
4	2011	Yuliia Rudnieva	Yevhen Bilozierov	Sonia Sukhorukova	Dasha Doris	Serhii Klimientiev	Anton Klimik	Erika; Oleksandr Pedan	Serhiy Kuzin	Novyi Kanal
5	2026	Povin'	Liyaa i Lesan	Dykyi	Nebokrai	Nana Solis	Nasù	Volodymyr Dantes; Dasha Kubyk	Alan Badoev	Sweet.tv
6	2027	TBA								Sweet.tv
All stars
1	2010	Oleksii Matias	Erika	Dmytro Kadnay	Volodymyr Dantes	Stas Shurins	Borysenko Brothers	Andriy Domanskyi; Masha Efrosynina	Natalia Mohylevska; Konstantin Meladze	Novyi Kanal

== Seasons & Contestants ==
=== Fabryka Zirok 1 (2007) ===
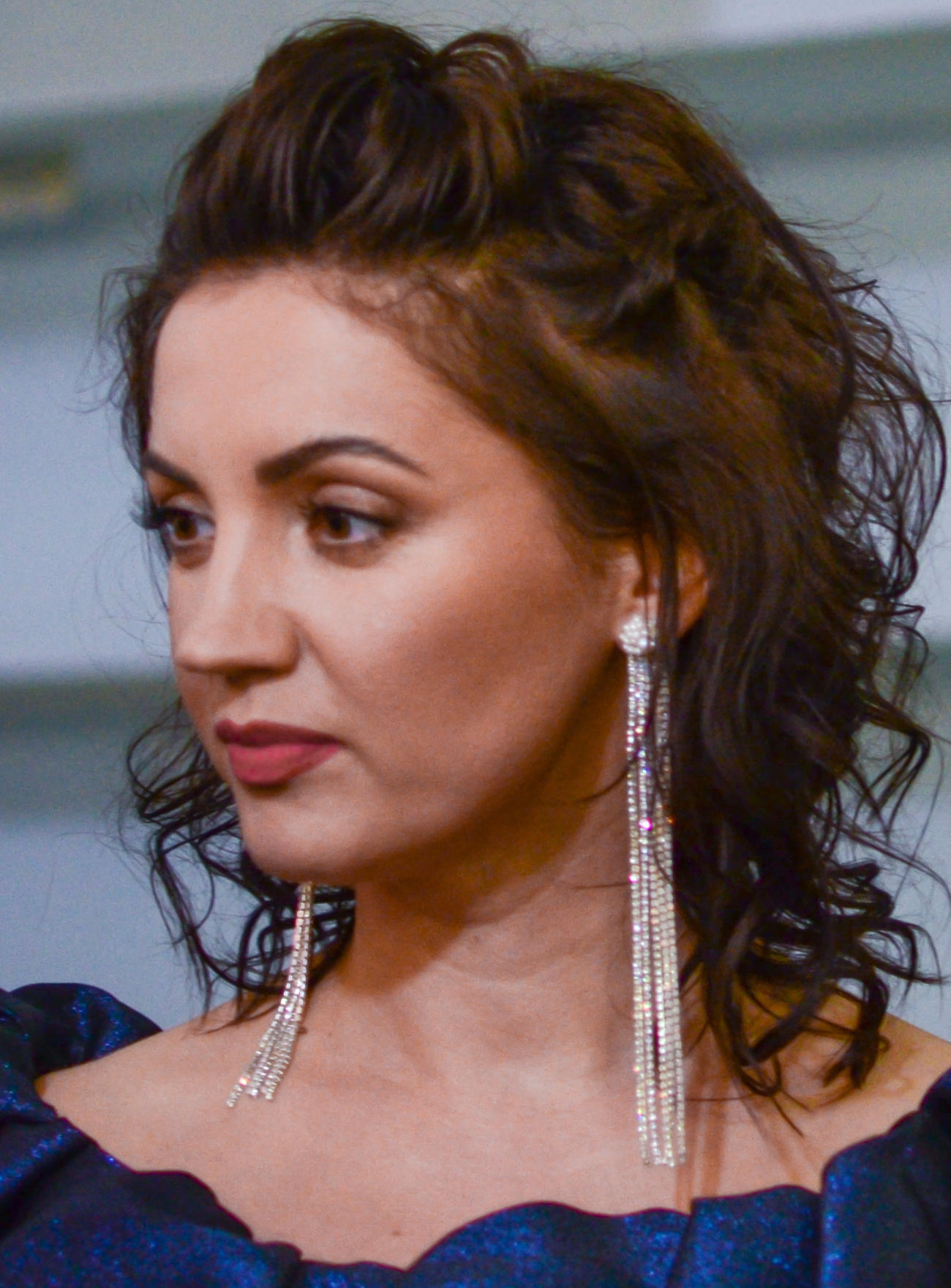
Olha Tsybulska, one of the two winners of season one

The first season of the Ukrainian reality television music competition Fabryka Zirok premiered in 2007 on Novyi Kanal. The show was hosted by Vasylysa Frolova and Andrii Domanskyi. The contestants received training from a team of instructors, including vocal coach Olena Grebenyok, choreographer Olena Kolyadenko, acting instructor Roman Viktyuk, fitness coach Lilia Podkopayeva, stylists Angela Litsiya and Volodimir Tarasyok, and psychiatrist Vadim Kolesnikov.

The competition featured contestants from different parts of Ukraine, as well as Oleksandr Bodyanskyi, who was listed as being from Moscow. The contestants competed in weekly Prime Show episodes, with eliminations taking place throughout the season.

Six contestants reached the final Prime Show. Olha Tsybulska and Oleksandr Bodyanskyi finished in joint first place, followed by Khrystyna Kim in second place and Vitaliy Galay in third. Yulia Borza finished fourth, while Evhen Tolochniy placed fifth and Dasha Astafieva finished sixth.

Several contestants subsequently pursued careers in the entertainment industry. Dasha Astafieva became known as a singer and model, while Evhen Milkovskiy later became the frontman of the rock band Nervy. Dmytro Kadnay continued his musical career under the name Kadnay, while Olha Tsybulska went on to establish herself as a singer and television presenter.

Contestant	Age	Hometown	Episode of elimination	Place finished
Olha Tsybulska	21	Radyvyliv	Final Prime Show	Winner
Oleksandr Bodyanskyi	26	Moscow	Final Prime Show	Winner
Khrystyna Kim	21	Dnipro	Final Prime Show	Runner-up
Vitaliy Galay	22	Zaporizhzhia	Final Prime Show	3rd
Yulia Borza	22	Odesa	Final Prime Show	4th
Evhen Tolochniy	18	Donetsk	Final Prime Show	5th
Dasha Astafieva	22	Pokrov	Final Prime Show	6th
Vitaliy Yarovyi	20	Kyiv	Prime Show 12	8th
Dasha Kolomiets	19	Cherkasy	Prime Show 11	9th
Elizabeth Anum-Dorkhuso	19	Odesa	Prime Show 10	10th
Evhen Milkovskiy	16	Pokrovsk	Prime Show 9	11th
Dmytro Kadnay	17	Dnipro	Prime Show 8	12th
Katya Velaskes	22	Kyiv	Prime Show 5	13th
Taras Cherniyenko	28	Chernihiv	Prime Show 4	14th
Sasha Ilchyshyn	20	Oniskove	Prime Show 3	15th
Arina Domsky	23	Kyiv	Prime Show 2	16th

=== Fabryka Zirok 2 (2008) ===
Winners

Volodymyr Dantes

Vadym Oliinyk

The second season of the Ukrainian reality television music competition Fabryka Zirok aired in 2008 on Novyi Kanal. The show was hosted by Dmytro Shepelev, while singer Natalia Mohylevska served as the music producer. The contestants received vocal training from Tetyana Piskaryova, choreography instruction from Olena Kolyadenko, and styling guidance from Olha Navrotska. Film director Alan Badoev was also involved in the preparation of the contestants.

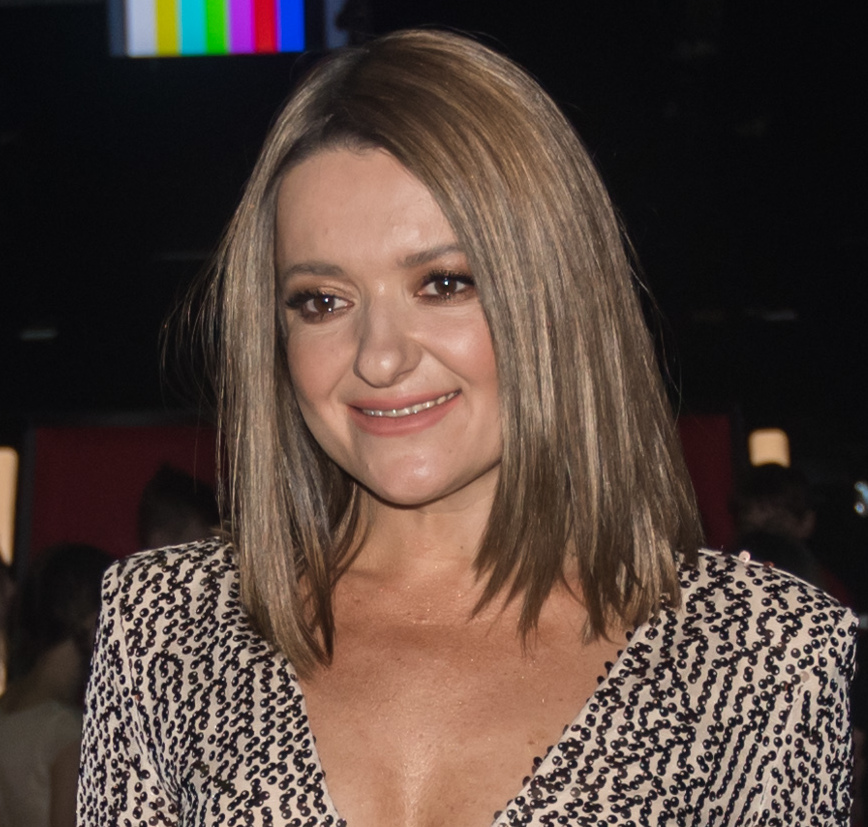
Natalia Mohylevska, mentor of the second season

During the competition, Gurgen voluntarily left the show in place of Regina Todorenko, allowing her to continue competing. Later, during the tenth Prime Show, Max Barskih also voluntarily withdrew from the competition. His departure was followed by Olena Vinogradova leaving the show as well.

Six contestants reached the final Prime Show. Volodymyr Dantes and Vadym Oliinyk finished in joint first place, followed by Alisa Tarabarova in second place, Borys Aprel in third, Vlad Darvin in fourth and Regina Todorenko in fifth.

Following the show, several contestants went on to achieve success in the entertainment industry. Max Barskih and Alisa (Svitlana) Tarabarova established successful solo music careers, while Volodymyr Dantes also became a successful singer and television personality. Regina Todorenko went on to become a prominent television presenter, while Vlad Darvin established himself as a songwriter, writing numerous popular songs for Ukrainian performers.

Following the season, two musical groups were formed. Dantes and Oliinyk formed the duo Dio Films, while Tarabarova, Mitsuki, Vinogradova and Todorenko became members of the girl group Real O. Both groups achieved success in the Ukrainian music industry.

Contestant	Age	Hometown	Episode of elimination	Place finished
Volodymyr Dantes	20	Kharkiv	Final Prime Show	Winner
Vadym Oliinyk	20	Chernivtsi	Final Prime Show	Winner
Alisa Tarabarova	21	Kherson	Final Prime Show	Runner-up
Borys Aprel	18	Chornomorske	Final Prime Show	3rd
Vlad Darvin	25	Kyiv	Final Prime Show	4th
Regina Todorenko	18	Odesa	Final Prime Show	5th
Max Barskih	19	Kherson	Prime Show 10	6th
Olena Vinogradova	24	Pivdennoukrainsk	Prime Show 10	7th
Anastasia Vostokova	22	Mariupol	Prime Show 9	8th
Mark Savin	25	Mykolaiv	Prime Show 8	9th
Kara Kay	27	Kyiv	Prime Show 8	10th
Lina Mitsuki	23	Kharkiv	Prime Show 6	11th
Anna Mukhina	24	Kyiv	Prime Show 5	12th
Kira Shaytanova	22	Kharkiv	Prime Show 4	13th
Gurgen	27	Crimea	Prime Show 3	14th
Denis Dekanin	24	Makiivka	Prime Show 2	15th

=== Fabryka Zirok 3 (2009) ===
Contestants

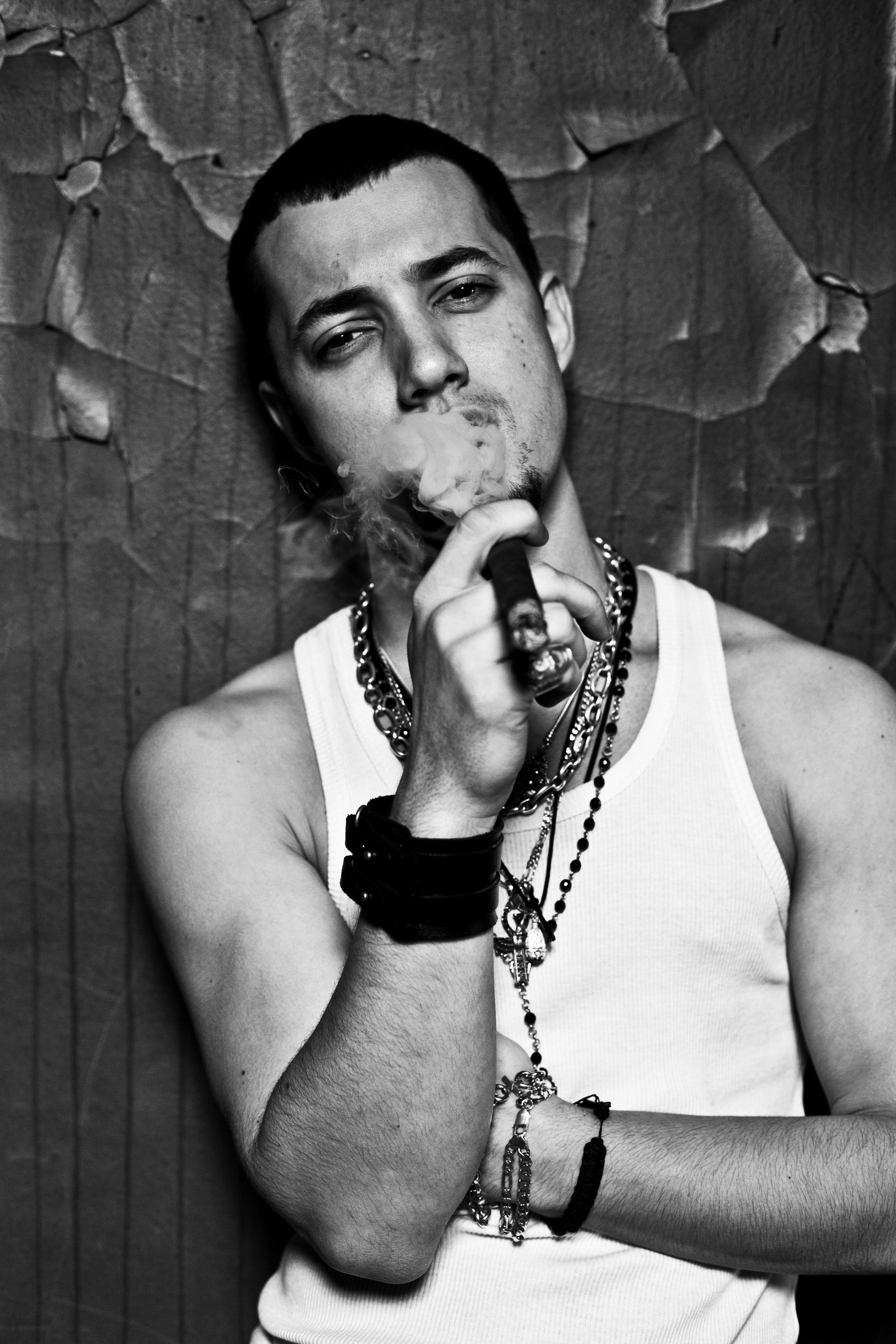
Stas Shurins (1st)

Kolya Serga (3rd)

Eva Bushmina (5th)

The third season of the Ukrainian reality television music competition Fabryka Zirok aired in 2009 on Novyi Kanal. The show was hosted by Andriy Domanskyi and Masha Efrosynina, while composer and producer Konstantin Meladze served as the musical producer and mentor of the contestants.

Third season logo

The season began with an unusual selection process. During the first Prime Show, four prospective contestants competed for two remaining places in the competition: the Borysenko Brothers, Santa Dimopulos, Pavlo Lee and Lybov Yunak. The final places were determined by a public vote, which resulted in the Borysenko Brothers and Santa Dimopulos joining the show.

During the ninth Prime Show, the Borysenko Brothers were eliminated after losing their nomination against Kolya Serga. However, the producers subsequently gave viewers another opportunity to bring back one previously eliminated contestant through an additional online vote. The Borysenko Brothers received the most votes and were reinstated as finalists.

Unlike the previous seasons, the main prize was a production contract with Konstantin Meladze. The final took place on New Year's Eve, with the winner announced shortly after midnight on 1 January 2010 during a live ceremony in Kyiv. Stas Shurins, a Latvian singer discovered through the show's online auditions, won the competition and received the promised contract. Oleksii Matias finished second, followed by Kolya Serga in third place. The Borysenko Brothers finished fourth, Eva Bushmina fifth, Erika sixth, Sabrina seventh and Iryna Krestinina eighth.

Despite winning the competition, Shurins never began working under the promised production contract with Meladze, and their professional relationship subsequently came to an end. Eva Bushmina was the only contestant from the season to establish a production partnership with Meladze, later joining his girl group Nu Virgos.

Contestant	Age	Hometown	Episode of elimination	Place finished
Stas Shurins	19	Riga	Final Prime Show	Winner
Oleksiy Matias	20	Kyiv	Final Prime Show	Runner-up
Kolya Serga	20	Odesa	Final Prime Show	3rd
Borysenko Brothers	17	Dnipro	Final Prime Show	4th
Eva Bushmina	20	Dovzhansk	Final Prime Show	5th
Erika	20	Chervonohrad	Final Prime Show	6th
Sabrina Abdullah	17	Kerch	Final Prime Show	7th
Iryna Krestinina	25	Kherson	Final Prime Show	8th
Tetyana Vorzheva	20	Dresden	Prime Show 9	9th
Vasyl Nahirnyak	18	Chernivtsi	Prime Show 8	10th
Artem Mekh	18	Novotroitske	Prime Show 8	11th
Vitaliy Chirva	21	Sofiivka	Prime Show 6	12th
Anastasia Plis	21	Kryvyi Rih	Prime Show 5	13th
Santa Dimopulos	22	Kyiv	Prime Show 4	14th
Andriy Philipov	23	Izium	Prime Show 4	15th
Alina Astrovska	20	Donetsk	Prime Show 2	16th
Pavlo Lee	21	Yevpatoria	Prime Show 1	Not selected
Lybov Yunak	23	Kyiv	Prime Show 1	Not selected

=== Fabryka Superfinal (2010) ===
Finalists

Erika (2nd)

Dmytro Kadnay (3rd)

The Superfinal aired on Novyi Kanal from 7 March to 23 May 2010 and brought together contestants from the first three seasons of Fabryka Zirok.

Fabryka Superfinal logo

The show was hosted by Masha Efrosynina and Andriy Domanskyi. Unlike the previous seasons, contestants were evaluated through a combination of judges' scores and audience voting. The jury included music producer Natalia Mohylevska and composer Konstantin Meladze, among other guests.

The competition featured several unusual departures and returns. During the third Prime Show, Oleksiy Matias received the lowest combined result and was expected to leave the competition. However, Eva Bushmina voluntarily gave up her place in the show in order to allow Matias to remain. Around the same time, she had been offered an opportunity to join the girl group Nu Virgos. Dmytro Kadnay was also initially due to be eliminated during the eighth Prime Show, but the show's organisers subsequently reinstated him.

Following his elimination, Borys Aprel won an online vote among previously eliminated contestants, which offered the winner an opportunity to return to the competition. However, he did not resume his participation in the show.

The final took place on 23 May 2010. Oleksiy Matias won the competition, with Erika finishing as runner-up and Dmytro Kadnay in third place. Volodymyr Dantes and Stas Shurins, the winners of the second and third seasons respectively, finished fourth and fifth.

Contestant	Age	Hometown	Original Season	Original Placement	Episode of elimination	Place finished
Oleksiy Matias	23	Kyiv	Season 3	2nd	Final Prime Show	Winner
Erika	22	Chervonohrad	Season 3	6th	Final Prime Show	Runner-up
Dmytro Kadnay	20	Dnipro	Season 1	12th	Final Prime Show	3rd
Volodymyr Dantes	23	Kharkiv	Season 2	1st	Prime Show 11	4th
Stas Shurins	21	Riga	Season 3	1st	Prime Show 11	5th
Borysenko Brothers	19	Dnipro	Season 3	4th	Prime Show 10	6th
Alisa Tarabarova	21	Kherson	Season 2	2nd	Prime Show 9	7th
Kolya Serga	22	Odesa	Season 3	3rd	Prime Show 7	8th
Max Barskih	21	Kherson	Season 2	6th	Prime Show 7	9th
Borys Aprel	21	Chornomorske	Season 2	3rd	Prime Show 6	10th
Vadym Oliinyk	23	Chernivtsi	Season 2	1st	Prime Show 5	11th
Olha Tsybulska	25	Radyvyliv	Season 1	1st	Prime Show 4	12th
Regina Todorenko	21	Odesa	Season 2	5th	Prime Show 4	13th
Eva Bushmina	22	Dovzhansk	Season 3	5th	Prime Show 3	14th
Elizabeth Anum-Dorkhuso	23	Odesa	Season 1	10th	Prime Show 2	15th
Vitaliy Galay	25	Zaporizhzhia	Season 1	3rd	Prime Show 1	16th

=== Fabryka Zirok 4 (2011) ===
Evhen Bilozerov, runner-up of the fourth season

The fourth season of Fabryka Zirok premiered on 28 August 2011 on Novyi Kanal. It was the final season of the original edition of the show. The first live show was hosted by singer Ivan Dorn. Erika, a contestant from the third season and Fabryka Superfinal, subsequently became the host of the live broadcasts, with television presenter Oleksandr Pedan joining her as a co-host from the second show. Pedan was responsible for reporting from the green room.

The season's musical producer was radio presenter and producer Serhiy Kuzin. The judging panel included singer Iryna Bilyk, radio executive Vitaliy Drozdov, music producer Olena Mozgova and television presenter Masha Efrosynina. Olena Kolyadenko served as the show's choreographer and stage director.

Sixteen contestants competed for the main prize, a two-room apartment in Kyiv, as well as an opportunity to pursue a professional music career. The season concluded on 20 November 2011. Yulia Rudneva won the competition and received the apartment as the main prize, along with a music production contract. Evhen Bilozerov finished in second place, while Sonya Sukhorukova took third. Dasha Doris placed fourth, Serhiy Klimentyev fifth, Anton Klimik sixth and Kseniya Lanova seventh.

Despite plans for further development, Fabryka Zirok was not renewed for another season. The fourth season ended with relatively low television ratings, contributing to the show's cancellation.

Contestant	Age	Hometown	Episode of elimination	Place finished
Yulia Rudneva	26	Odesa	Final Prime Show	Winner
Evhen Bilozerov	20	Kharkiv	Final Prime Show	Runner-up
Sonya Sukhorukova	19	Kharkiv	Final Prime Show	3rd
Dasha Doris	18	Kyiv	Final Prime Show	4th
Serhiy Klimentyev	24	Dnipro	Final Prime Show	5th
Anton Klimik	18	Vinnytsia	Final Prime Show	6th
Kseniya Lanova	19	Homyel	Final Prime Show	7th
Pavlo Voronets	21	Odesa	Prime Show 11	8th
Snizhana Firsova	18	Kharkiv	Prime Show 10	9th
Yuriy Klyuchnyk	24	Lviv	Prime Show 9	10th
Misha Sokolovskiy	16	Kropyvnytskyi	Prime Show 8	11th
Paulina Dmytrenko	27	Kharkiv	Prime Show 6	12th
Denis Lyubimov	22	Kyiv	Prime Show 5	13th
Anna Voloshyna	23	Luhansk	Prime Show 5	14th
Masha Goya	23	Kryvyi Rih	Prime Show 3	15th
Dima Kaminskiy	25	Minsk	Prime Show 2	16th

=== Fabryka Zirok 5 (2026) ===
Fabryka Zirok 2026 contestants autographs

The fifth season of Fabryka Zirok premiered on 4 September 2026 on the streaming platform Sweet.tv, marking the revival of the Ukrainian version of the show after a 15-year hiatus. The season introduced a revamped format, with contestants taking part in a music academy where they received professional training and worked on developing their own artistic identities. The show was hosted by singer Volodymyr Dantes and television presenter Dasha Kubik.

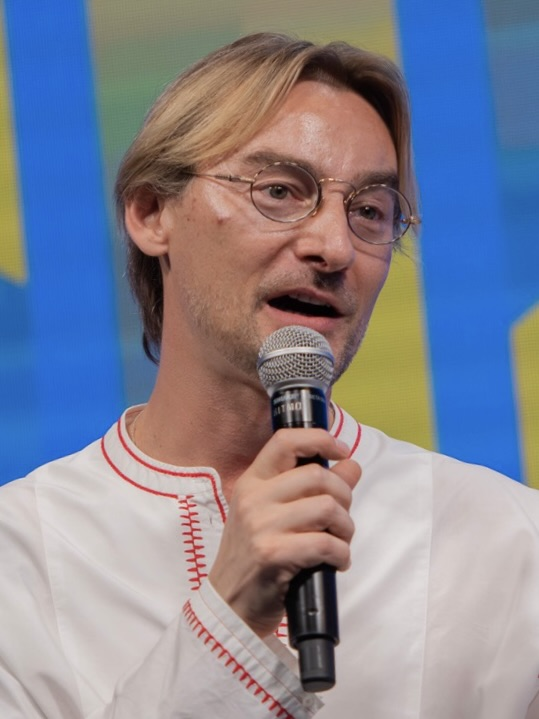
Alan Badoev, mentor of the fifth season

Filmmaker Alan Badoev served as the main mentor of the project. The coaching team consisted of singers Tayanna and Laud, who were responsible for vocal training, choreographer Yana Tsybulska, and actor Vitaliy Azhnov, who coached contestants in acting. Ruslan Makhov served as the show's director, while M1shka was the music producer.

The main judging panel consisted of producer Iryna Horova, music producer Ivan Klymenko and Alan Badoev. Each Prime Show also featured a guest judge. The guest judges, in order of appearance, were Dorofeeva in the first Prime Show, Kazhanna in the second, Monatik in the third, Kolya Serga in the fourth, Kola in the fifth, Phil It in the sixth, Dmytro Shurov in the seventh, Max Barskih in the eighth, Jamala in the ninth and Ivan Frolov in the tenth.

Following the casting process, 12 contestants were initially selected to join the project. An additional, thirteenth place was determined through a public vote among 20 candidates who had failed to advance from the Top 32 selection stage. The other eliminated candidates were Eric, Zelenyi, Savruk, Kugatessa, Nknkt, Ivanna, Marsha, Pronkin, Bo Bohdan, Furman, Anna Doyna, Volt Band, Dram, Marisem, Yuriy Levytskyi, Niko Gerosimchuk, The Lu, Mykola Vatula, and Tenditna. During the first Prime Show, held on 17 September, Veronika Stepanenko, known professionally as Povin', won the audience vote and became the thirteenth contestant.

Voting for contestants also has a charitable component. Funds raised through audience voting on the Sweet.tv platform are collected and donated to support the Superhumans Center, a rehabilitation centre for people affected by the war.

According to the organizers, the first episode garnered more than 1.8 million views during its opening weekend following its premiere.

For security reasons, amid continued Russian ballistic missile and drone attacks on Kyiv during the Russian invasion of Ukraine, episodes are filmed just one day before their broadcast and aired without post-production editing.

Contestant	Real name	Age	Residence	Episode of elimination	Place finished
Povin'	Veronika Stepanenko	22	Boryspil	Final Prime Show	Winner
Liyaa i Lesan	Liliia Palamar and Oleksandr Kruhlyi	21 / 25	Kobeliaky / Bershad	Final Prime Show	Runner-up
Dykyi	Oleksandr Dykyi	23	Kharkiv	Final Prime Show	3rd
Nebokrai	band (Mykyta Maznichenko - soloist)	20	Vinnytsia	Final Prime Show	4th
Nana Solis	Anastasiia Polupan	20	Vyshneve	Final Prime Show	5th
Nasù	Anastasiia Mudryk	20	Lviv	Prime Show 9	6th
Bereza	Vadym Berezovskyi	20	Kamianets-Podilskyi	Prime Show 8	7th
Disha	Diana Stasiuk	18	Bucha	Prime Show 8	8th
Xstatty	Alina Hrynevych	21	Kvartsytne	Prime Show 7	9th
Tender Di	Dmytro Ivanov	24	Kyiv	Prime Show 7	10th
Anna Simon	Anna Simon	24	Berlin	Prime Show 5	11th
Mýro	Myroslav Strekho	17	Kyiv	Prime Show 4	12th
Jezusman	Ivan Andrusiv	31	Uzhhorod	Prime Show 3	13th
Eric	Erik Mkrtchian	20	Kharkiv	Prime Show 1	Not selected
Zelenyi	Vitalii Zelenyi	26	Chornomorske	Prime Show 1	Not selected
Savruk	Vitalii Savruk	22	Ivano-Frankivsk	Prime Show 1	Not selected

==== Results summary ====
Colour key

–	Contestant was up for elimination but was saved by the guest judge.
–	Contestant was up for elimination but was saved by the contestants.
–	Contestant was originally set to be eliminated but was saved by the mentor.
–	Contestant was nominated for elimination.
–	Contestant was immediately saved by the public vote.
–	Contestant was eliminated.

	Prime 1	Prime 2	Prime 3	Prime 4	Prime 5	Prime 6	Prime 7	Prime 8	Prime 9	Prime 10
Povin'	Saved	Dykyi	Mýro	Tender Di	Nominated	Bereza	Liyaa i Lesan	Saved	Finalist	Winner (Final)
Povin'	Saved	Dykyi	Mýro	Tender Di	Nana Solis	Bereza	Liyaa i Lesan	Saved	Finalist	Winner (Final)
Liyaa i Lesan	Safe	Nana Solis	Bereza	Disha	Nominated	Bereza	Saved	Povin'	Finalist	Runner-up (Final)
Liyaa i Lesan	Safe	Nana Solis	Bereza	Disha	Saved	Bereza	Saved	Povin'	Finalist	Runner-up (Final)
Dykyi	Safe	Nominated	Bereza	Disha	Saved	Bereza	Nominated	Nominated	Finalist	3rd Place (Final)
Dykyi	Safe	Nominated	Bereza	Disha	Nana Solis	Bereza	Nominated	Nominated	Finalist	3rd Place (Final)
Nebokrai	Safe	Nana Solis	Nominated	Tender Di	Dykyi	Nominated	Liyaa i Lesan	Nominated	Finalist	4th Place (Final)
Nebokrai	Safe	Nana Solis	Nominated	Tender Di	Liyaa i Lesan	Nominated	Liyaa i Lesan	Nominated	Finalist	4th Place (Final)
Nana Solis	Safe	Saved	Bereza	Disha	Nominated	Bereza	Liyaa i Lesan	Povin'	Finalist	5th Place (Final)
Nana Solis	Safe	Saved	Bereza	Disha	Saved	Bereza	Liyaa i Lesan	Povin'	Finalist	5th Place (Final)
Nasù	Safe	Nana Solis	Mýro	Disha	Dykyi	Nebokrai	Liyaa i Lesan	Nominated	Eliminated (Prime 9)	
Nasù	Safe	Nana Solis	Mýro	Disha	Nana Solis	Nebokrai	Liyaa i Lesan	Nominated	Eliminated (Prime 9)	
Bereza	Safe	Nana Solis	Saved	Disha	Nana Solis	Saved	Nominated	Eliminated (Prime 8)		
Bereza	Safe	Nana Solis	Saved	Disha	Liyaa i Lesan	Saved	Nominated	Eliminated (Prime 8)		
Disha	Safe	Jezusman	Bereza	Saved	Dykyi	Xstatty	Nominated	Eliminated (Prime 8)		
Disha	Safe	Jezusman	Bereza	Saved	Nana Solis	Xstatty	Nominated	Eliminated (Prime 8)		
Xstatty	Safe	Jezusman	Bereza	Disha	Dykyi	Nominated	Eliminated (Prime 7)			
Xstatty	Safe	Jezusman	Bereza	Disha	Nana Solis	Nominated	Eliminated (Prime 7)			
Tender Di	Safe	Jezusman	Nebokrai	Nominated	Povin'	Nominated	Eliminated (Prime 7)			
Tender Di	Safe	Jezusman	Nebokrai	Nominated	Nana Solis	Nominated	Eliminated (Prime 7)			
Anna Simon	Safe	Jezusman	Bereza	Nominated	Eliminated (Prime 5)					
Mýro	Safe	Nana Solis	Nominated	Eliminated (Prime 4)						
Jezusman	Safe	Nominated	Eliminated (Prime 3)							
Eric	Eliminated	Not selected (Prime 1)								
Zelenyi	Eliminated	Not selected (Prime 1)								
Savruk	Eliminated	Not selected (Prime 1)								
Up for elimination	Savruk; Zelenyi; Povin'; Eric	Nebokrai; Jezusman; Dykyi; Nana Solis	Xstatty; Mýro; Nebokrai; Bereza	Tender Di; Povin'; Anna Simon; Disha	Liyaa i Lesan; Dykyi; Povin'; Nasù; Nana Solis	Tender Di; Bereza; Nebokrai; Xstatty; Dykyi	Disha; Dykyi; Nasù; Bereza; Liyaa i Lesan	Nebokrai; Dykyi; Nasù; Povin'; Liyaa i Lesan	Winner	Povin'; 34% to win
Saved by guest judge	None	Nebokrai	Xstatty	Povin'	Nasù	Dykyi	Nasù	Liyaa i Lesan	Winner	Povin'; 34% to win
Saved by contestants	None	Nana Solis; 5 of 10 votes to save	Bereza; 6 of 9 votes to save	Disha; 6 of 8 votes to save	Dykyi; 4 of 6 votes to save	Bereza; 4 of 6 votes to save	Liyaa i Lesan; 4 of 4 votes to save	Povin'; 2 of 2 votes to save	Finalist	Liyaa i Lesan; 32% to win
Saved by contestants	None	Nana Solis; 5 of 10 votes to save	Bereza; 6 of 9 votes to save	Disha; 6 of 8 votes to save	Nana Solis; 6 of 8 votes to save	Bereza; 4 of 6 votes to save	Liyaa i Lesan; 4 of 4 votes to save	Povin'; 2 of 2 votes to save	Finalist	Liyaa i Lesan; 32% to win
Saved by public vote	Povin'; Most votes to save	Dykyi; 84% to save	Nebokrai; 54% to save	Tender Di; 81% to save	Povin'; 43% to save	Nebokrai; 49% to save	Dykyi; 55% to save	Dykyi; 37% to save	Finalist	Dykyi; 17% to win
Saved by mentor	None				Liyaa i Lesan; 41% to save	None		Nebokrai; 37% to save	Finalist	Dykyi; 17% to win
Eliminated	Eric	Jezusman; 16% to save	Mýro; 46% to save	Anna Simon; 19% to save	None	Xstatty; 33% to save	Bereza; 25% to save	Nasù; 26% to save	Finalist	Nebokrai; 9% to win
Eliminated	Zelenyi	Jezusman; 16% to save	Mýro; 46% to save	Anna Simon; 19% to save	None	Tender Di; 18% to save	Disha; 20% to save	Nasù; 26% to save	Finalist	Nana Solis; 8% to win
Eliminated	Savruk	Jezusman; 16% to save	Mýro; 46% to save	Anna Simon; 19% to save	None	Tender Di; 18% to save	Disha; 20% to save	Nasù; 26% to save	Finalist	Nana Solis; 8% to win

== Criticism, incidents and scandals ==
The Novyi Kanal (Ukrainian: Новий Канал) TV channel and Konstantin Meladze consider the appearance of a foreign performer at the Star Factory to be a miracle, and have appropriated the artist who miraculously appeared from Riga at the casting in Kyiv. Despite the resonance of the case, none of the organisers and producers of the Ukrainian Star Factory project confirmed the theft of Stas Shurin from the global talent agency TUARON and its Swedish talent manager Anton Sova. According to the Ukrainian music publication Muzvar, the case of the artist and the manager was included in the TOP-5 most famous cases of breakdowns in the Ukrainian music industry.

Acknowledging that the artist had a manager would have meant that the artist would have lost his place in the contest and would have had legal consequences for all parties. The artist himself denied any business relationship with the Swedish talent manager Anton Sova and the global talent agency TUARON in order to keep his place in the "Star Factory-3" competition, which he eventually won.
