= Tanu Muiño =

Ukrainian music video director, designer

- Таня Муїньо
- Born: Tetyana Robertivna Muinyo; 7 December 1989 (age 36); Odessa, Ukrainian SSR (present-day Ukraine)
- Occupations: Music video director, photographer
- Years active: 2001–present

Tetyana Robertivna Muinyo (Ukrainian: Тетяна Робертівна Муїньо; born 7 December 1989), better known as Tanu Muiño (Ukrainian: Таня Муїньо), is a Ukrainian music video director, designer, stylist, photographer and film director. Known for her work on music videos by popular artists: Harry Styles' "As It Was"/"Daylight", Lil Nas X "Montero", Cardi B's "Up", Normani's "Wild Side" and works for Dua Lipa, Lizzo, Jung Kook, Post Malone, Rosalía, Elton John, Britney Spears, Sam Smith, Doja Cat and others.

== Biography ==
Her father is Robert Muiño, a Cuban national. In the 1980s, he came to Odesa on an exchange and stayed in Ukraine. Her mother is Ukrainian. Tanu has three brothers and a sister. Until the age of six, Tanu lived in Havana.

== Career ==
In 2016, she began collaborating with the Ukrainian singer Monatik. As of November 2020, Muiño was the director of 14 Monatik videos.

In 2019, Muiño directed the music video for "Small Talk" by American singer Katy Perry.

In 2020, she collaborated with Spanish singer Rosalía. She directed Monatik's musical "Rhythm," which was released on his YouTube channel in September 2020. In the fall of 2020, she directed the video for "Cotton Candy" by the British musician Yungblud. The video was shot in Kyiv on 1 October.

In 2021, she directed the music videos for Cardi B's "Up", Lil Nas X's "Montero (Call Me By Your Name)", and Normani's "Wild Side".

In 2022, she directed the music video for Harry Styles' lead single "As It Was" from his third studio album Harry's House, which became Billboard's number-one song of 2022 globally.

In 2024, she directed the Eurovision Song Contest 2024 staging for Ukrainian representatives, rap artist Alyona Alyona and singer Jerry Heil. The performance, which took place on May 11, 2024, in Malmö, Sweden, presented their song "Teresa & Maria", resulting in a third-place finish for Ukraine.

== Videography ==
Year	Title	Artist
2013	"Знаешь"	Rozhden
2014	"Нельзя поменять"	Eva Bushmina
2015	"Не преступление"	Eva Bushmina
2016	"#kakvoda"	Layah
2016	"Тени"	Layah
2016	"Невысомыми"	Layah
2016	"Преданы"	Layah
2016	"Кружит"	Monatik
2016	"Ни ты, ни я"	Rozhden feat. L'One
2016	"Выходной"	Monatik
2016	"Вечность"	Monatik
2017	"Не прячься:	Layah
2017	"Навсегда"	Layah
2017	"Молчать"	Layah
2017	"Vitamin D"	Monatik
2017	"УВЛИУВТ"	Monatik
2017	"Тролль"	Vremya i Steklo
2017	"Плохо танцевать"	IOWA
2018	"Дай мне"	NK
2018	"То, от чего без ума	Monatik
2018	"Ранена"	Layah
2018	"Е, Бой"	Vremya i Steklo
2018	"Глубоко"	Monatik feat. Nadya Dorofeeva
2018	"Lomalo"	NK
2018	"Зашивает душу"	Monatik
2018	"Hasta La Vista"	Michelle Andrade
2018	"ФЭН-ШУЙ"	Glukoza
2019	"Maybe"	Braii
2019	"Love it ритм"	Monatik
2019	"Podruga"	Skriptonit
2019	"Злой"	СБПЧ
2019	"Small Talk"	Katy Perry
2019	"Каждый раз	Monatik
2019	"Лoх"	Vremya i Steklo
2019	"Часы"	СБПЧ
2020	"Juro Que"	Rosalía
2020	"Отдаём"	Rozhden
2020	"Сильно"	Monatik
2020	"ВЕЧЕРиНОЧКА"	Monatik feat. Vera Brezhneva
2020	"Потанцуй со мной"	Iowa
2020	"Достопримечательность"	Lida Lee feat. Monatik
2020	"УВЛИУВТ на улице Пикадилли"	Monatik feat. Laima Vaikule
2020	"ритмоLove"	Monatik feat. Lida Lee & Nino Basilaya
2020	"Gorit"	Dorofeeva
2020	"Cotton Candy"	Yungblud
2020	"Sestra"	Vera Brezhneva
2020	"Никаких стен"	Сёстры
2021	"Up"	Cardi B
2021	"Montero"	Lil Nas X
2021	"Wild Side" (with Cardi B)	Normani
2021	"Rumors" (with Cardi B)	Lizzo
2021	"Fleabag"	Yungblud
2021	"One Right Now" (with the Weeknd)	Post Malone
2022	"2am"	Foals
2022	"Chicken Teriyaki"	Rosalía
2022	"As It Was"	Harry Styles
2022	"Save Yourself"	One Ok Rock
2022	"Hold Me Closer"	Elton John and Britney Spears
2023	"I'm Not Here to Make Friends"	Sam Smith
2023	"Attention"	Doja Cat
2023	"Daylight"	Harry Styles
2023	"Bongos"	Cardi B feat. Megan Thee Stallion
2023	"TK421"	Lenny Kravitz
2023	"Standing Next to You"	Jungkook
2024	"Can't Get Enough"	Jennifer Lopez feat. Latto
2024	"Я залишусь молодим"	Volodymyr Dantes
2024	"Illusion"	Dua Lipa
2024	"А що?"	Monatik
2024	"Хартбіт"	Dorofeeva
2024	"Mantra"	Jennie
2024	"Disease"	Lady Gaga
2025	"Messiah"	Sevdaliza
2026	"Swim"	BTS
2026	"Normal"	BTS
2026	"Dancing on My Own"	Malcolm Todd

== Awards and nominations ==
Muiño holds the record for the most wins in the "Best Video Clip" category at the annual Ukrainian music awards YUNA (won three years in a row: in 2016, 2017, and 2018). She was also awarded "Music Video Maker of the Year" at the M1 Music Awards (2018).

In 2021, she won the MTV Video Music Award for Best Direction along with Lil Nas X for the music video of "Montero (Call Me by Your Name)". In 2022, her work directing the music video for Harry Styles' song "As it Was" was nominated for the MTV Video Music Award for Best Direction. In 2025, she won Director of the Year at the Hollywood Music Video Awards.
