= Zi Faámelu =

Ukrainian singer and songwriter (born 1990)

- Зі Фамелу
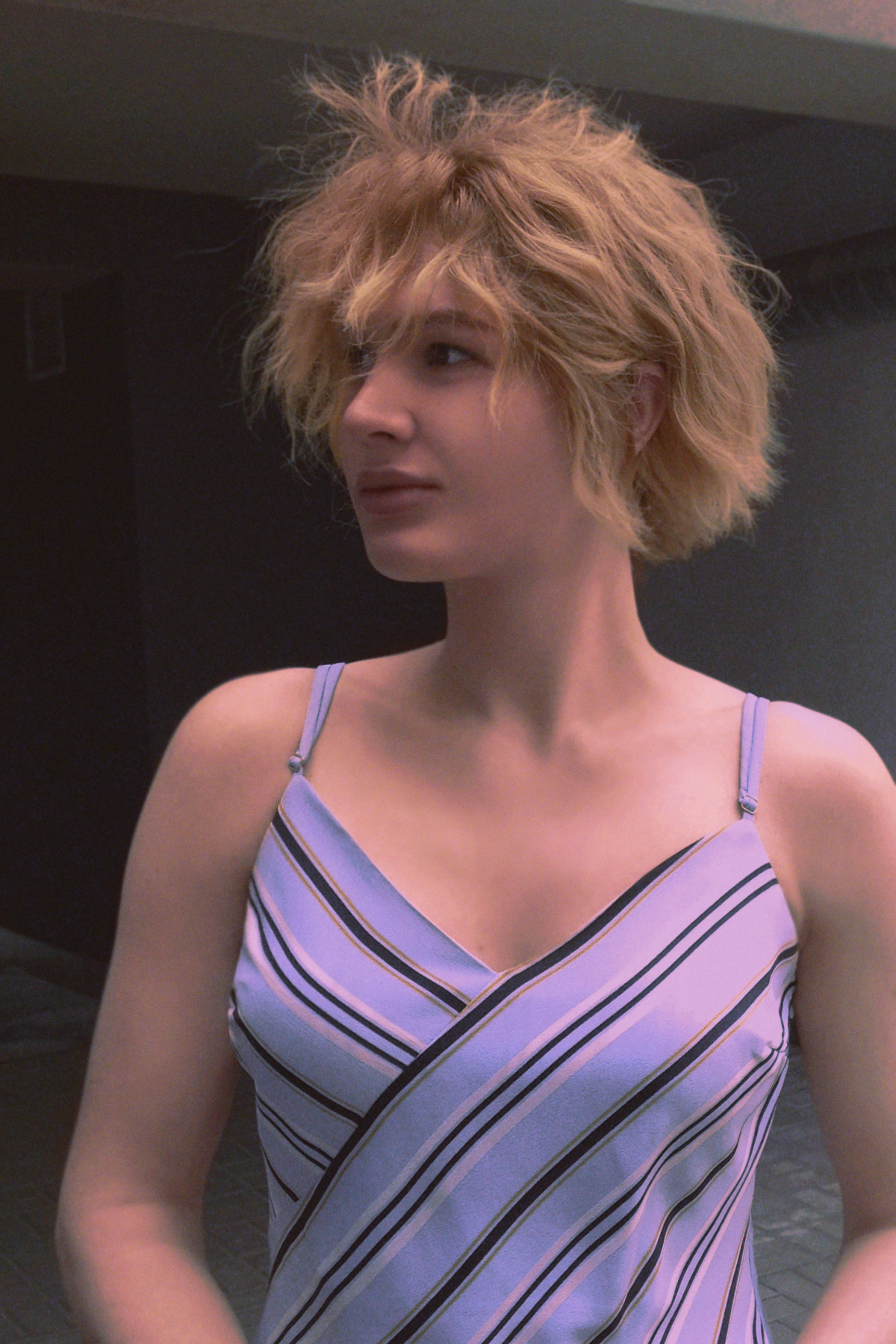
- Faámelu in 2019
- Born: 12 December 1990 (age 35); Chornomorske, Ukrainian SSR, Soviet Union
- Other names: Boris April; Ziandzha
- Occupations: Singer; songwriter; television personality
- Years active: 2008–present
- Musical career
- Genres: Pop
- Instrument: Vocals
- Label: Independent

Zi Faámelu (born 12 December 1990) is a Ukrainian singer and songwriter. She is best known for her participation in the television shows Star Factory, Star Factory. Superfinal, and The Voice of Ukraine, and for her four-octave vocal range. She came out as a transgender woman in 2014. She previously performed under the stage name Boris April, and released her debut album Incognito in October 2010.

== Early life ==
Faámelu was born to shipbuilder Maksim Kruhlov and his wife Olena in Chornomorske, Crimea, Ukraine. She has a brother named Heorhiy and a sister named Anna. She began identifying as female around the age of six. According to her, she was often beaten in school by her male classmates for acting too feminine. After graduating from music school in Chornomorske, she applied to the Kyiv National University of Culture and Arts, intending to further study singing. Her first application was rejected, but her second one was approved and she studied show business management.

== Star Factory ==
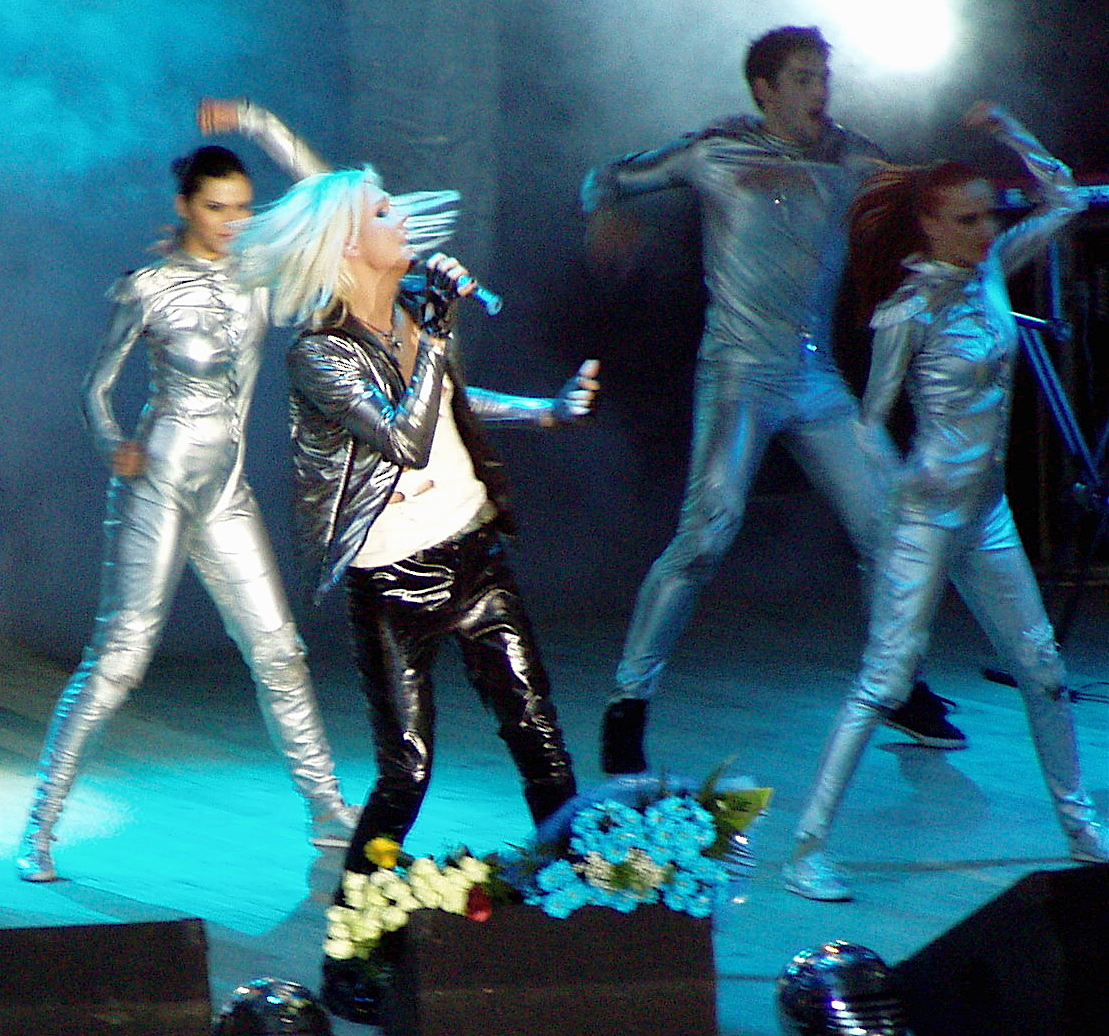
Faámelu in Chernivtsi as a "Star Warrior"

At the end of September 2008, the TV project Star Factory 2 was launched in Kyiv. Zi, at the time student of Kyiv National University of Culture and Arts, decided to participate. She dyed her hair in a bright white colour, to match an image of "star warrior" and took the stage name Boris April. During the audition, her performance and outrageous appearance impressed the jury. So seventeen-year-old, at that time, Faámelu became the youngest participant.

Faámelu then developed a dedicated fan base. According to the results of the audience vote, at the end of the project, she received a special prize from the Tele 7 magazine "For the greatest sympathy of readers." During her time at the project, she had numerous collaborative musical performances, with famous Eastern European pop-music acts, including Ukrainian singer Evgenia Vlasova, winner of 2004 Eurovision Song Contest Ruslana and Romanian europop band "Morandi".

=== Star Factory. Superfinal ===
In March 2010, a new television project Star Factory. Superfinal has started. During her participation in Superfinal, Faámelu sang six new songs, two of them in English, as well as Jewish folk song "Hava Nagila", for which she wrote her own lyrics in Russian.

On 11 April 2010, based on the results of voting and evaluations of the jury, Faámelu left the project. Fans of the artist, not wanting to accept the departure of their idol from the project, continued to go to concerts, demanding her return onto the project. Resulting in protests and pickets at the entrance to the Dovzhenko Film Studios, where the show was filmed. As a result of the protests, the organizers of the competition decided to organise an online vote for the return of one of the retired participants to the project, which Faámelu won. Despite this, on 25 April, show host Maria Efrosinina announced from the stage that Faámelu had disappeared and her location was unknown.

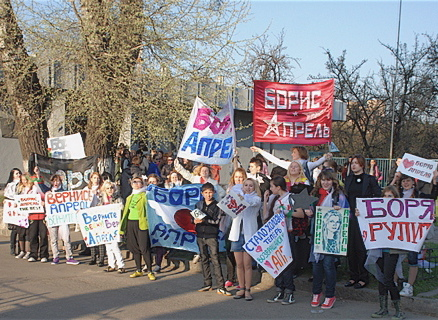
Protesters demanding the return of Faámelu on Star Factory. Superfinal

On 6 May, the agency Talant Group reported that Faámelu was found in Yalta, and was transferred to the hospital in Kyiv. Faámelu stated that she was extremely exhausted and depressed by the show and the treatment by other participants and organisers. While in the hospital, she was diagnosed with anorexia. At the end of the season, Faámelu returned to participate in the gala celebrating the end of the show.

== After the show ==
In October 2010, Faámelu released her debut album Incognito.

From May to September 2012, Faámelu toured with the ballet Persona P in China. The tour was celebrated as a success.

After Faámelu's return from China, she collaborated with writer Lada Luzina to launch a photo project. Named "Dying Kyiv", it was a series of photos created to tell about the decaying buildings of the city. During the shooting in one of the old buildings, Faámelu suffered a minor injury. On 13 November 2012, a photo exhibition was presented at the Kyiv History Museum. After the photo exhibition, all photos and some of the personal belongings and lots from Faámelu and Lada Luzina, as well as other famous Kyivans were sold at a charity auction to raise funds for the restoration of one of Kyiv's famous historic buildings, The Chocolate House.

In 2018, Faámelu participated under the name Ziandzha in the eighth season of The Voice of Ukraine, where she lost in quarterfinal.

In December 2020, after eight years without new releases, Faámelu released two new singles: "Fallen Angel" and "Undiscovered Animal".

== Personal life ==
On 12 December 2014, her 24th birthday, Faámelu made a post coming out as a transgender woman. She also announced that she had a boyfriend; the relationship lasted five months. She has often discussed the transphobia she experienced in Ukraine. She stated that her former producer Natalia Mohylevska had put her through conversion therapy, which resulted in her adopting a more masculine appearance for some time, and that she became estranged from her parents. She attempted to legally change her gender marker in 2016 but found the process too "humiliating and demoralising".

Following the 2022 Russian invasion of Ukraine, Faámelu fled the country. As her legal documents still listed her as male, she feared being considered a man of fighting age and thus being drafted. According to her, she attempted to flee multiple times but was returned to Ukraine each time until she swam across the border with Romania. She eventually left for Germany, where she lives with a host family in Magdeburg. Her story received international attention. Although she fled the country illegally, she has expressed her love for Ukraine and her hope that it wins the war.

== Discography ==
=== Studio albums ===
- Incognito (2010)

=== Singles ===
Year	Title	Album
2008	"Zvyozdnyi voin" (Star Warrior)	Incognito
2008	"Kosmos, priyom!" (Space, Hello!)	Incognito
2009	"Mne tak nuzhna tvoya lyubov" (I Need Your Love So Much)	Incognito
2010	"My belye" (We Are White)	Incognito
2011	"P.S. Lyublyu tebya, drugaya planeta" (P.S. I Love You, Other Planet)	Incognito
2012	"Elektrichestvo" (Electricity)	Non-album single
2020	"Fallen Angel"	Non-album single
2020	"Undiscovered Animal"	Non-album single
