= Korhan Abay =

Turkish actor

- Born: 1 January 1954 (age 72); Istanbul, Turkey
- Occupations: Actor, author, film director and producer

Korhan Abay (born 1 January 1954) is a Turkish actor, author, film director and producer.

== Career ==
Abay is a show-business icon in Turkey, well known for his work as an actor, writer, host and producer of numerous national and international TV shows and events. He co-hosted the 2004 Eurovision Song Contest with Meltem Cumbul. Korhan can also speak French and English.

== Filmography ==
- Se upp för dårarna / Kapılara Dikkat, (2007)
- Ev Hali (as Tolga), (2002) (TV series)
- Alamancının Karısı (as Cemil), (1987)
- Büyük Koşu, (1987) (TV series)
- Kıskıvrak (as Selçuk), (1986)
- Şıpsevdi (as Raci), (1977) (TV series)
- Mahallede Şenlik Var, (1976)
- Kötüler de Ağlar, (1976)
- Canavar Cafer, (1975)
- Kazım'a Ne Lazım, (1975)
- Soysuzlar, (1975)

== See also ==
- List of Eurovision Song Contest presenters

Preceded by (Latvia) Marie N & Renārs Kaupers	Eurovision Song Contest presenter (with Meltem Cumbul); 2004	Succeeded by (Ukraine) Maria Efrosinina & Pavlo Shylko
