= DJ Pasha =

Ukrainian radio and television presenter (born 1977)

Pavel Shilko
- Born: Pavel Yuriiovych Shilko; August 6, 1977 (age 49); Mezhdurechensk, Kemerovo Oblast, USSR
- Other name: DJ Pasha
- Education: Taras Shevchenko National University of Kyiv
- Occupations: Record producer; radio presenter; TV personality
- Years active: 1996–present

Pavlo Yuriiovych Shylko (Ukrainian: Павло Юрійович Шилько) (also known as DJ Pasha; born August 6, 1977) is a Ukrainian radio and television presenter. He co-hosted Eurovision Song Contest 2005 with Maria Efrosinina (Masha) at the Palace of Sports in Kyiv.

== Biography ==
In 1983 Shylko relocated with his family to Zaporizhzhia, where he completed his secondary education at General Education School No. 97. Between 1994 and 1999, he obtained a higher education degree at the Faculty of Foreign Languages of Taras Shevchenko National University of Kyiv, majoring in "Translation" and qualifying as a philologist and written translator for Spanish and English languages. He also holds a second higher education degree: a diploma in psychology from the same university.

=== Personal life ===
Since 2001 he has been married to Hanna Moskvych, raising two children: Sofia and Nataliia.

== Career ==
=== Work in radio ===
In 1996 he began working at «Gala Radio» a radio DJ. For over 11 years, he hosted morning shows such as «Davai Vstavai», «Masha ta Pasha», and «Gala-Morning», and for over 12 years, he was the author and host of the hit parade «Pasha's Top 20». During his time at «Gala Radio», he held positions as program director, creative director, and general director of the radio station, as well as president of the «Gala Media Group» company. He conducted exclusive reports from international events, including: Grammy 2000, 2001; Brazilian Carnival 2003; Olympic Games 1996, 2000, 2004, 2006, 2008, 2010, 2012, 2014; UEFA European Championship 2000, 2008; Ice Hockey World Championship 2004, among others. In 2002, according to the magazine «Media Expert», he ranked first in the popularity rating of radio hosts for May–June. He delivered presentations at European conferences of the National Association of Broadcasters: in 2004 in Lisbon and in 2008 in London. In 2007 he set a record registered in the «Book of Records of Ukraine» in the «Marathon» category for the longest continuous DJ shift on air. From April 23–25, he broadcast for 50 hours, 1 minute, and 34 seconds. In 2007 he was the author, producer, and host of the «Gala Radio» campaign «Pan or Propav», which was recognized as one of the three «Best Media Campaigns of the Year» at the European Radio Awards. In 2008, according to the company «Brand Support», he was recognized as the most recognizable radio host in Ukraine. In 2013 he served as a consultant for the radio station «Format» (Zaporizhzhia Oblast). In 2015, following a change in format and name of «Gala Radio», he hosted the hit parade «29 Europeans» on the newly created «Radio EU».

=== Work in television ===
He has been working in television since 1999, when he became the host of the TV show «Melomania» on the 1+1 channel. Since then and up to the present, he has also hosted the following television shows: «Khochu i Budu» (1+1), «Zirkovyi Duet» (Inter), «Z Novym Rankom!» (Inter), «Dyvis» (TET), and «Ostanniy Komik» (ICTV). He provided commentary for the broadcast of the Oscar ceremony in 2011 (Inter) and hosted prestigious national ceremonies that had televised versions. From 2010 to 2011, he served as the creative producer of the morning show «Z Novym Rankom!» (Inter), and in 2012, he was the music producer for the transformation show «SHOWMASTGOON» (Novyi Kanal). In 2014, he provided commentary for tennis matches on the XSPORT channel.

=== Participation in Eurovision ===
He has been involved with the Eurovision since Ukraine's first participation

- 2003 – Commented on the Eurovision 2003 for First National and served as a consultant for Ukraine's contestant Oleksandr Ponomaryov.
- 2004 – Announced Ukraine's voting results live from Kyiv.
- 2005 – Co-hosted the 50th Eurovision held in Ukraine alongside Maria Efrosinina. He was also one of the organizers of the Eurovision Song Contest 2005.
- 2006 – Commented on the Eurovision 2006 for First National, served as a consultant for Ukraine's contestant Tina Karol, and co-authored her contest song «Show Me Your Love».
- 2007 – Served as a consultant for Ukraine's contestant Verka Serduchka and co-authored her contest song «Dancing Lasha Tumbai».
- 2009 – Hosted a private Ukrainian party for Ukraine's contestant Svetlana Loboda in Moscow.
- 2010 – Served as a consultant for Azerbaijan's contestant, singer Safura.
- 2017 – Appointed as the official spokesperson for Eurovision 2017.

Preceded by Meltem Cumbul and Korhan Abay	Host of the Eurovision Song Contest (with Maria Efrosinina); 2005	Succeeded by Sakis Rouvas and Maria Menounos

=== Event hosting ===
In addition to Eurovision, he has hosted numerous large-scale events and ceremonies:

- 1998 — Concert by the band Prodigy in Kyiv;
- 1999 – Concert by the band E-Type in Kyiv;
- 2000 – Finale of the Gala Radio campaign «Blind Wedding»;
- 2002 – Ice show «We Are Champions!»;
- 2002–2005 – Charity Ball under the patronage of the U.S. Embassy;
- 2003–2005 – Run for Life;
- 2003–2005 — Europe Days in Ukraine;
- 2005 – Presidential Ball;
- 2005 – Orange Ball in honor of Viktor Yushchenko's inauguration;
- 2005 — «Choice of the Year» Ceremony;
- 2005 — Teletriumph Ceremony;
- 2005 – Earth Day;
- 2005 — Bryan Adams concert in Kyiv;
- 2005–2006 — «Golden Lily» Festival;
- 2005–2006 — «Pride of the Nation» Ceremony;
- 2006 — Person of the Year Ceremony;
- 2007 – Finale of the Gala Radio campaign «Pan or Propav»;
- 2007–2011 – Charity Masquerade Ball «Carnivalia»;
- 2011 – 20th Anniversary of U.S.-Ukrainian Diplomatic Relations;
- 2011 – Presentation of the official UEFA Euro 2012 ball;
- 2011 – Presentation of the official UEFA Euro 2012 logo;
- 2012 – 20th Anniversary of the Football Federation of Ukraine;
- 2013 – Ukraine Days in the United Kingdom.

Since 2003 he has been the regular host of the charity event «Burns Night» organized by the international charity organization Lions Club in Ukraine. He also hosted the charity event «Kozak Night» for the same organization three times (in 2006, 2007, and 2011).

Between 2004 and 2011 he hosted celebrations of U.S. Independence Day in Kyiv multiple times.

Between 2004 and 2005 he hosted album presentations for Ani Lorak, Gaitana, and the band Lyapis Trubetskoy. He has also hosted and authored scripts for numerous client events, including those for Coca-Cola, Adidas, Procter & Gamble, JTI, Samsung, Visa, Medoff, Lifecell, McDonald's, Kodak, Kyivstar, and others.

== See also ==
- List of Eurovision Song Contest presenters

Preceded by (Turkey) Meltem Cumbul & Korhan Abay	Eurovision Song Contest presenter (with Maria Efrosinina); 2005	Succeeded by (Greece) Sakis Rouvas & Maria Menounos
