= Sweet.tv =

International Streaming platform

SWEET.TV
- Website type: video on demand internet television
- Available in: eng, pl, sk, cz, bg, ukr, ro, hu
- Headquarters: Bratislava, Slovakia; Kyiv, Ukraine
- Website: sweet.tv
- Commercial: yes
- Registration: yes
- Launched: December 19, 2017

SWEET.TV (in Ukrainian: Світ.тв) is an international OTT TV streaming and video-on-demand (VOD) platform that is the product of the SWEET.TV Group, a media technology holding that operates in the telecommunications market since 2008.

SWEET.TV has direct contracts with major Hollywood studios, including Walt Disney Pictures/20th Century Studios, Paramount Pictures, Universal Pictures, Sony Pictures, and Warner Bros. Discovery.

Since 2021, SWEET.TV has expanded its presence in international markets and now operates in 18 countries, including Slovakia, Czechia, Hungary, Romania, Poland, Bulgaria, Latvia, Lithuania, Estonia, Serbia, Croatia, Slovenia, Montenegro and other Balkans countries.

== History ==
The OTT product was launched on December 19, 2017. In 2018, its app was released on Smart TV, Android and iOS.

In January 2019, the company signed contracts with various Ukrainian movie production and SWEET.TV VOD library featured Ukrainian movies from Film.ua Group (films from the Crazy Wedding franchise Crazy Wedding, Crazy Wedding 2, Crazy Wedding 3, etc.) and films from smaller film studios.

In November 2020, the company signed a new direct agreement with Sony Pictures exactly for the territory of Ukraine, (not for the CIS in general), and according to this agreement, SWEET.TV subscribers can watch premiere movies from Sony Pictures with Ukrainian dubbing as part of their subscription and without additional fees; SWEET.TV became the first Ukrainian VOD platform to open access to Sony Pictures' with library official Ukrainian dubbing."

In 2020, SWEET.TV won the "Best OTT Provider of the Year" by 1+1 media distribution and was a second-degree laureate in the "Media Solution of the Year" category at the Telecom Awards 2020.

In January 2021, the company signed a direct agreement with Disney specifically for the territory of Ukraine, and according to this agreement, SWEET.TV subscribers can watch movies from Disney Pictures with Ukrainian dubbing as part of their subscription and without additional fees.

In March 2021, the company signed a new direct agreement with CBS specifically for the territory of Ukraine, not Russia/CIS, and under this new agreement, SWEET.TV subscribers can watch CBS TV series with official Ukrainian dubbing created by the company at its own costs as part of the Hollywood in Ukrainian project.

In 2021, it received the Ukrainian People's Award for "Interactive TV of the Year", a bronze Effie Award in "Influencer Marketing" for the Battle of Bloggers project, recognition from the American Chamber of Commerce in Ukraine for leadership during the COVID-19 crisis the "Best Ukrainian Online Cinema" title at the Telecom Awards, and a Certificate of Membership from the European Business Association.

SWEET.TV's international expansion began with a test launch in Slovakia and Czechia in 2021. In 2022, the service was fully launched in Hungary, Slovakia, and Czechia. In 2023, Romania, Poland, and Bulgaria were added to the list.

=== Attitude to Russia's full-scale invasion of Ukraine ===
SWEET.TV Group strongly condemns Russia's aggression against Ukraine. In 2022, in protest, SWEET.TV terminated all contracts and ceased all cooperation with Russian content providers. The company is now supporting Ukrainian viewers and increasing the Ukrainian-language content on the platform. SWEET.TV also supports charity programs and provides information support. In July 2022, SWEET.TV together with the SES, provided access to a mine safety education course worldwide.

== Content ==
=== Internet television ===
SWEET.TV provides OTT Internet TV services and distributes more than 200 local and international TV channels in all 18 countries of operation. These include national channels, regional channels, exclusive FAST channels and video on demand (VOD).

=== FAST channels ===
Launched in August 2022, FAST channels offer content with movies, TV series, children's programs, interviews, travel, cooking and comedy. Currently, there are more than 50 channels available to watch for free on all devices, both for SWEET.TV subscribers and all other users.

=== Video on demand ===
SWEET.TV provides video-on-demand services for more than 10,000 movies and TV shows that can be viewed in high quality. The content is available in the local and original languages (usually English). The platform offers movies and TV series from Disney, Paramount, Universal, and Sony studios.

Regarding Ukrainian dubbing, in November 2020, the-village.com.ua reported that 95% of content on SWEET.TV is available with high-quality Ukrainian dubbing or voice-over.

=== Original programming ===
Since 2020, Sweet tv produces its own Ukrainian-language Sweet tv Originals. In November 2020, the platform released a sitcom miniseries Startapery. In September 2021, it created the TV program National Liberation Soloist (a stand-up recording by comedian Andriy Shchegel)."

On January 22, 2026, Sweet tv announced new original programming slated for release in 2026. The platform revealed new Ukrainian adaptations of previously adapted international formats, Star Academy and So You Think You Can Dance, which will be produced by Volodymyr Zavadiuk's Big Entertainment Shows. Sweet tv also announced that it had acquired the rights to additional show formats, including Name That Tune, Destination X, and Would I Lie To You?.

==== Drama ====
Title	Genre	Premiere	Seasons	Status
Khovaiuchy kolyshniu (Ховаючи колишню)	drama	November 26, 2025	Season 1, 10 episodes	Unknown

==== Comedy ====
Title	Genre	Premiere	Seasons	Status
Startapery (Стартапери)	sitcom	November 16, 2020	Season 1, 8 episodes	Ended; Miniseries
Zhyttia na tr'okh (Життя на трьох)	comedy	October 17, 2025	Season 1, 20 episodes	Unknown

==== Unscripted ====
Title	Genre	Premiere	Seasons	Status
Siurpryz dlia rodyny (Сюрприз для родини)	reality show	February 14, 2025	Season 1, 9 episodes	Unknown
Zradnyky (Зрадники)	game show	October 31, 2025	Season 1, 10 episodes	Renewed
Untitled adaptation of Star Academy	talent show	2026	TBA	Pending
Untitled adaptation of So You Think You Can Dance	dance competition	2026	TBA	Pending
Vhaday melodiyu (Вгадай мелодію)	music game show	2026	TBA	Pending
Untitled adaptation of Destination X	travel competition show	2026	TBA	Pending
Vpiznai brekhniu (Впізнай брехню)	comedy panel show	2026	TBA	Pending

=== Ukrainian-language content (Hollywood in Ukrainian) ===
SWEET.TV makes Ukrainian-language dubbing/voice-over films and TV series from various Ukrainian studios, including Film.ua Group (Tak Treba Production/Postmodern Postproduction), Tretyakoff Production (Cinema Sound Production), etc.

=== Hollywood in Ukrainian: dubbing of films/series ===
In March 2021, as part of the Hollywood in Ukrainian project, SWEET.TV began producing Ukrainian-language dubbing/voicing for CBS TV series with Ukrainian dubbing studios. This became possible after signing a direct contract with the owners of CBS specifically for the territory of Ukraine (and not Russia/CIS)." In particular, in March 2021, the seventh and eighth seasons of the TV series Dexter were dubbed; and a little later, the first three seasons of the TV series Elementary and the first 3 seasons of the TV series Billions also received Ukrainian-language dubbing. Subsequently, in August 2021, SWEET.TV reported that for more than a year of the Hollywood Ukrainian project's existence, they have already dubbed 181 films/series in Ukrainian. At the end of September 2021, a Ukrainian-language audio track was added to the Deadbeats series.

=== Hollywood in Ukrainian: dubbing movies ===
In August 2020, as part of the Hollywood in Ukrainian project, SWEET.TV began making Ukrainian-language dubbing for films of various Hollywood studios released before 2006 in Ukraine. In August 2020, the company signed direct and indirect contracts for dubbing and voice-over of feature films with Walt Disney Pictures/20th Century Studios, Paramount Pictures, Universal Pictures, Sony Pictures, and Warner Bros. Entertainment. In September 2020, the first eight films received Ukrainian-language dubbing from SWEET.TV, and they were the first 4 films of the Harry Potter franchise, 3 films of the Lord of the Rings franchise, and the first film of the Madagascar franchise. In December 2020, the next six films received Ukrainian dubbing by SWEET.TV, and they were the first 3 films of the Mission: Impossible franchise and the first 3 films of the Matrix franchise. In February 2021, the next two non-franchise films received Ukrainian dubbing from SWEET.TV: Pretty Woman and Groundhog Day." In March 2021, the first two films of the Men in Black franchise and the first film of the Bridget Jones franchise received Ukrainian dubbing by SWEET.TV. In April 2021, the second film of the Shrek franchise received Ukrainian dubbing by SWEET.TV. In April 2021, Ukrainian dubbing by SWEET.TV was given to Pulp Fiction. In May 2021, Ukrainian dubbing by SWEET.TV was given to Forrest Gump and Top Gun.

In 2024, SWEET.TV opened its own Dolby Digital 5.1 dubbing studio. They provide dubbing and voice-over services in accordance with international sound and localization standards. They also provide these services on the market. As of May 2024, 110 films have been dubbed into Ukrainian.
