= Eva Bushmina =

Ukrainian singer and songwriter (born 1989)

Layah
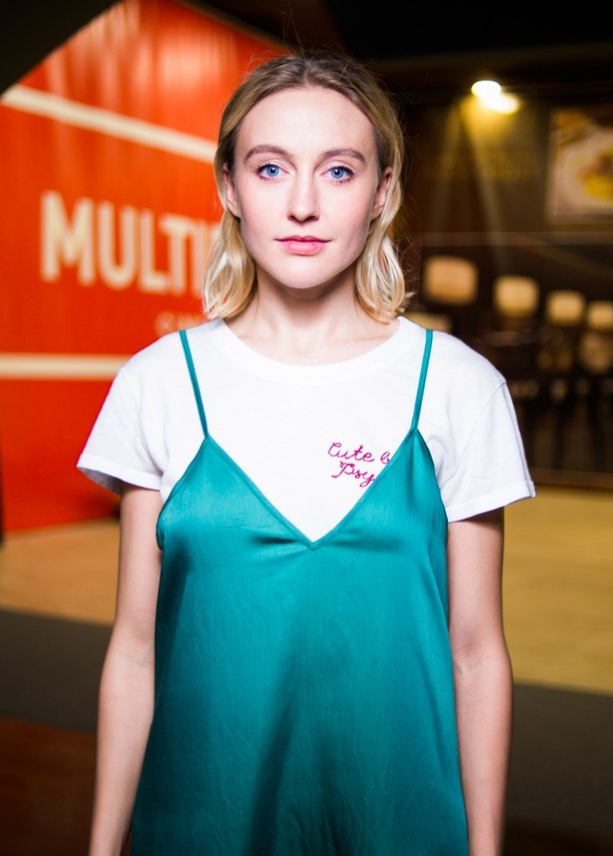
- Layah at the premiere of Swallow the Dust in 2021
- Born: Yana Ihorivna Shvets; 2 April 1989 (age 37); Sverdlovsk, Luhansk Oblast, Ukrainian SSR, Soviet Union
- Citizenship: Ukrainian
- Occupations: Singer; actress; television presenter
- Years active: 2009–present
- Height: 1.65 m (5 ft 5 in)
- Children: 1
- Musical career
- Genres: Indie; house music; alternative rock; jazz
- Instrument: Vocals
- Formerly of: Nu Virgos

Yana Ihorivna Lanova (née Shvets; Ukrainian: Яна Ігорівна Ланова, née Швець; born 2 April 1989), known by her stage names Eva Bushmina (Ukrainian: Ева Бушмина) and Layah (stylised in all capital letters, 2016–2025), is a Ukrainian singer, actress, television presenter and a former member of girl group Nu Virgos.

== Life and career ==
=== Early years ===
Yana Shvets was born on 2 April 1989, in Sverdlovsk, Luhansk Oblast.

Shvets graduated from Sverdlovsk School No.9. In 2001, she was admitted to the Variety and Circus Academy to the Variety Vocal Department in Kyiv.

=== 2009—2010: Lucky and Fabrika Zvyozd 3 ===
Shvets was the lead singer of the group Lucky, was a backup vocalist for the Ukrainian singer NK and the band Aviator.

Through a selection process, which took place in October 2009, out of thousands of contenders, she became a member of the Ukrainian show Fabryka Zirok where she adopted the pseudonym Eva Bushmina.

=== 2010–2012: Nu Virgos ===
On 21 March 2010, Bushmina announced her early separation from the show (Fabryka Zirok) and joined the Ukrainian girl group Nu Virgos where she replaced Tatiana Kotova. Bushmina made her debut as a member of the group on 30 March on the Ukrainian TV show "Вечерний квартал". Her debut single with Nu Virgos was "Пошёл Вон" (Go Away) which was released on 28 March. Nu Virgos then toured through Ukrainian cities with their show "ВИА-Графия". In September, the group released a new single "День Без Тебя" (A Day Without You) and in October, the video for it was released.

In February 2012, the group released a single "Алло, Мам" (Hello, Mom). In December, Bushmina left the group.

=== 2013—2016: Solo career ===
In January 2013, Bushmina recorded her first single "Собой" (Myself). The single was premiered on 22 March. On 4 July, the new single was released under the title "Лето напрокат" (Summer for hire). On 25 September, Bushmina released a new single "Религия" (Religion). In the middle of 2013, she was invited as a coach on the show "Хочу В ВИА Гру" (I Want To Be In VIA Gra) however, she refused due to a recent childbirth.

From 2014 to 2016, Bushmina released new singles such as "Как вода" (As Water), "Нельзя поменять" (Can't Change), "Не преступление" (Not a Crime) and "Тени" (Shadows) which were later included on her debut self-titled album "LAYAH".

=== 2016—2025: LAYAH ===
On 25 April 2016, Bushmina announced that the project "Eva Bushmina" terminates its existence.

For a long time the name "Eva Bushmina" was in harmony with the image and creativity, but because of the many experiments and transformations of the musical style - it is no longer relevant. It's time to close the door to the past and start from scratch, without the echoes of the "Fabrika Zvyozd" and the group "Nu Virgos". Now you will see the real me, open and authentic. Eva Bushmina is an artificially created character and it's time to say goodbye to her. I want to be real with my audience. My name is Yana. I am completely different inside and I would like the audience to understand this and accept me, my art and my worldview. From now on my music will sound under the name LAYAH.

In September, she released her debut album "LAYAH" which consists of 11 tracks including (Как вода, Нельзя поменять, Не преступление and Тени).

In March 2017, Layah released the music video for the song "Не Прячься" (Don't Hide). On 27 November, Layah released an EP "Вне времени" (Timeless) In support of the album, a music video was filmed for the single "Молчать" (Silence) in Berlin. At the end of December, Layah released the video for the song Timeless.

On 1 June 2018, Layah released a song titled "NAZLO" (Out of Spite). On 21 June 2019, Layah released a house-inspired mini-album titled "Сам за себя" (For Yourself). In the summer of 2021, she released a second EP titled "Drunk Promises".

== Discography ==
- 2016 — LAYAH
- 2017 — Вне времени — EP
- 2019 — Сам за себя — EP
- 2021 — Drunk Promises — EP

=== Videography ===
==== with Lucky ====
- 2007 — За рекой
- 2008 — Я больше не буду

==== with Nu Virgos ====
- 2010 — Пошёл Вон & День Без Тебя
- 2012 — Алло, Мам

==== as solo artist ====
- 2013 — Собой, Лето напрокат & Религия
- 2014 — #kakvod & Нельзя поменять
- 2015 — Не преступление
- 2016 — Тени, Невесомыми & Преданы
- 2017 — Не прячься, Навсегда, Молчать & Вне Времени
- 2018 — Ранена, NEO & NAZLO
- 2019 — Изнанка
- 2020 — End of Summer
- 2021 — Мастер
