= MamaRika =

Ukrainian singer and actress (born 1989)

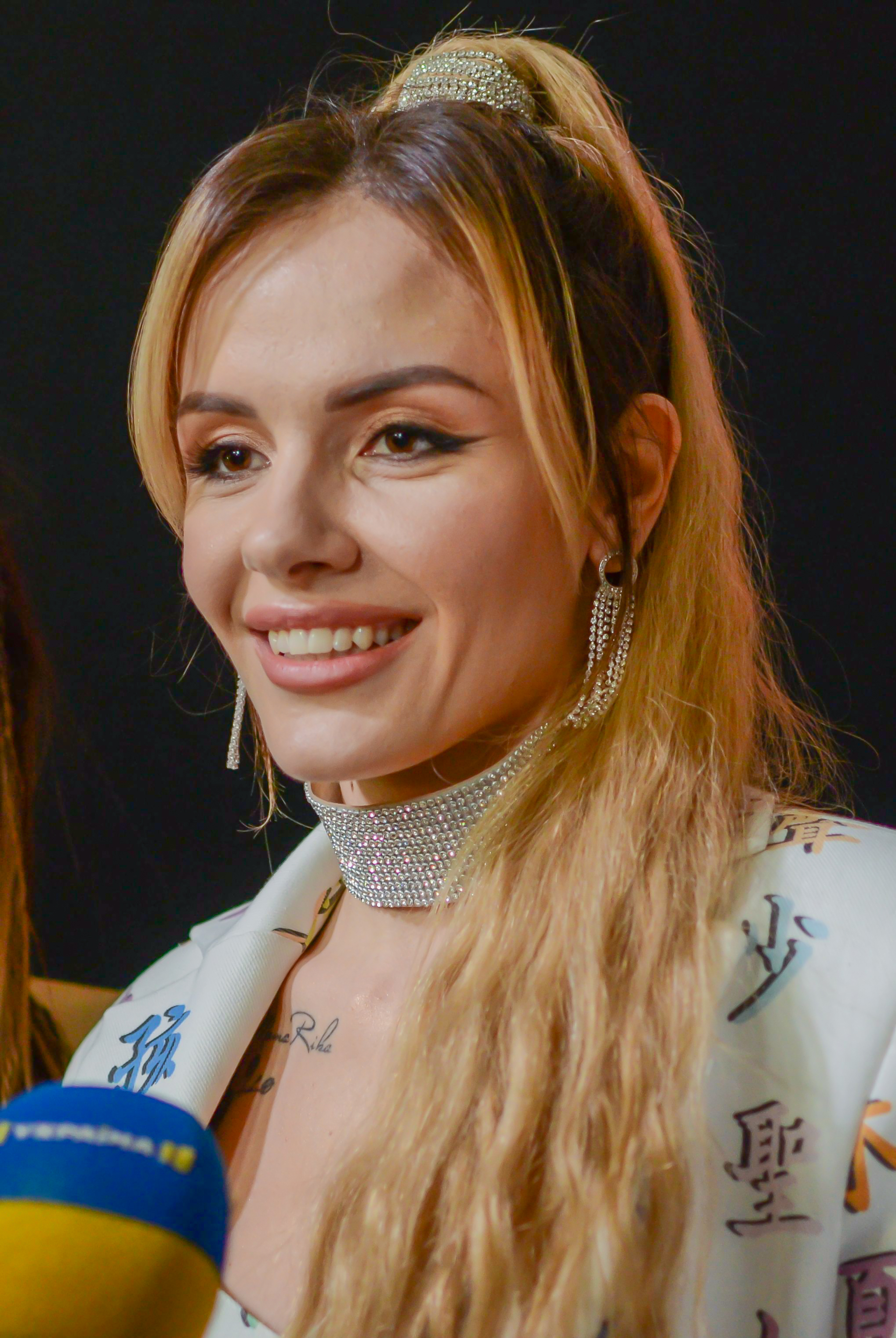
- MamaRika at the 2019 M1 Music Awards
- Born: Anastasia Oleksandrivna Kochetova; 13 April 1989 (age 37); Chervonohrad, Ukrainian SSR, Soviet Union
- Other name: Erika
- Citizenship: Ukrainian
- Occupations: Singer; actress
- Years active: 2003–present
- Spouse: Serhiy Sereda (m. 2020)
- Musical career
- Genres: Pop; pop rock; alternative hip-hop; funk; jazz
- Instrument: Vocals

Anastasia Oleksandrivna Kochetova (Ukrainian: Анастасія Олекса́ндрівна Кочетова; born 13 April 1989), known by her stage name MamaRika and previously Erika, is a Ukrainian singer and actress.

== Early life ==
Kochetova was born on 13 April 1989 in Chervonohrad. She graduated from the Faculty of Foreign Languages of the University of Lviv, where she specialized in translating to English. She worked as an office manager and vocal teacher.

== Career ==
=== Early career ===
At the age of 14, Kochetova won the Chervona Ruta competition. At the age of 17, she participated in the talent show American Chance, led by producer David Junk, who had previously achieved success in the United States with the Russian groups t.A.T.u. and Smash!! She was one of five girls who were grouped as Glam. However, the project was halted due the 2008 financial crisis and a low amount of interest in the project from the American music industry. Glam released one promotional song, "Thirsty", which was never released commercially.

=== 2009–2015: Erika ===
At the age of 19, Kochetova, under the pseudonym "Erica", became a finalist in the talent show "Fabryka Zirok 3" under the direction of Konstantin Meladze. She returned as a host of live broadcasts of Fabryka Zirok 4 and took part in Fabrika Zvyozd: Russia-Ukraine.

From 2010 to 2015, Erika was a singer at the UMMG Production Center under producer Serhiy Kuzin.

On 7 April 2011, the premiere of the animated film Rio took place, in which Erica voiced Jewel in the Ukrainian dub. Erica's conference has repeatedly accompanied local and large-scale events, including concerts in Maidan Nezalezhnosti. In 2012 she starred in the musical "Happy New Year, Peace!" in Kazakhstan. In 2013, Erica collaborated with American opera singer George Komsky, as well as with Grammy-winning producers Bobby Campbell and Andrew Kapner of AngelHouseStudios in Los Angeles.

In November 2015, it became known that Erika stopped working with Serhiy Kuzin and changed her pseudonym to "MamaRika". According to the Ukrainian music publication Muzvar, the case of the artist and her manager was included in the TOP-5 most famous cases of break-ups in the music industry of Ukraine.

=== 2016–present: MamaRika ===
In early April 2016, Kochetova had stopped working with Kuzin and changed her stage name to "MamaRika". The same month saw the premiere of the comedy TV series Once Upon a Time in Odesa, in which she played the role of Yulia. In 2017, she performed at the first MRPL City festival in Mariupol In December of the same year in one of Kyiv's clubs she presented a concert program and a second studio album "KACH".

== Personal life ==
Kochetova is married to Serhiy Sereda. Kochetova met Sereda in 2015 when they were invited to a show for a music channel. They got engaged in January 2018. They married in Thailand in March 2020. On 2 August 2021, she gave birth to a son.

== Discography ==
=== Studio albums ===
- 2012 — Папарацци (Paparazzi)
- 2017 — КАЧ (Quality)

=== Singles ===
- 2013 — Душа (Soul, featuring Motor'rolla)
- 2011 — Смайлик (Smiley)
- 2013 — Папарацци (Paparazzi)
- 2016 — МамаРіка (MamaRika)
- 2016 — Ніч у барі (Night at the Bar)
- 2017 — We are one

== Awards and honors ==
In August 2011, Kochetova won the Crystal Microphone show business award in the Singer of the Year category. In 2017, she was nominated for a YUNA award in the "Discovery of the Year" category. In 2018, she won a RAP.UA award in the "Best music video" category for her music video ХХДД. She was first place in the "Radio Discovery of the Year" category for the 2019 TopHit radio chart. In 2021, her song "Mavka" was nominated for a YUNA award in the "Best Hip-Hop Hit" category.
