= Olexandr Pedan =

Ukrainian showman and TV presenter (born 1982)

Oleksandr Pedan
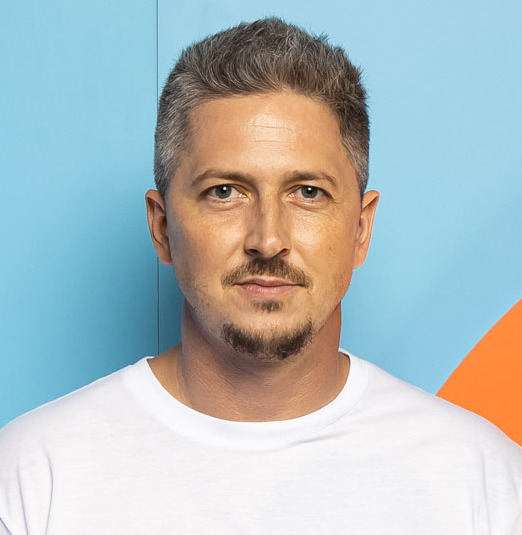
- Pedan in 2022
- Born: Oleksandr Serhiyovych Pedan; March 24, 1982 (age 44); Khmelnytskyi, Ukraine
- Other name: Oleksandr "Angel" Pedan
- Occupations: Showman, TV presenter, comedian
- Years active: 1999–present

Oleksandr Serhiiovych Pedan (Ukrainian: Олександр Сергійович Педан; born March 24, 1982, Khmelnytskyi) is a Ukrainian showman and TV presenter.

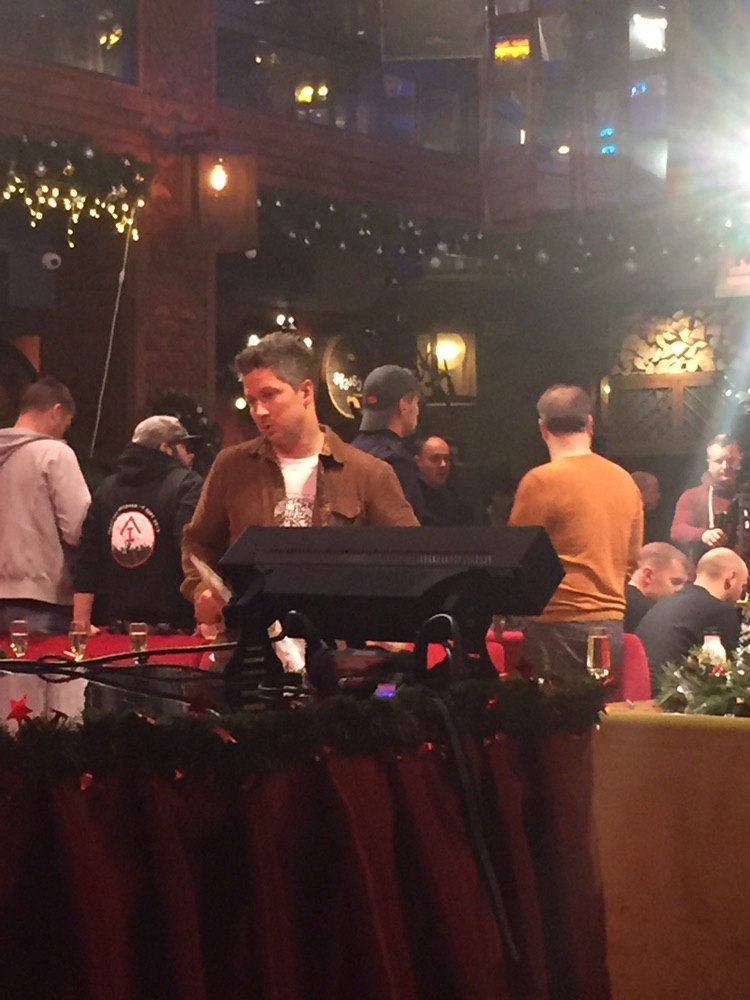

== Biography ==
His father Serhii Yosypovych and mother Valentyna Mykolaivna met in the dance ensemble at the university. Oleksandr became their third child. He has two older brothers. After graduating from school, he entered the Faculty of Economics of Khmelnytskyi National University. In 2004 he received the diploma of "manager-economist". In 2006 he moved to Kyiv. Oleksandr met his future wife Inna in the 9th grade during the school's KVN. Then they met again in student years and dated steadily until their marriage in 2003. They have a son and a daughter; Oleksandr called the most difficult time in family life the period when he began his career in Kyiv, but his wife lived with their daughter in Khmelnitskyi.

In 2010 he started playing football in the team of FC Maestro.

== Career ==
Oleksandr dreamed of becoming an actor from childhood, at school, he was a participant in amateur performances. Completed the Theater Department of Khmelnytskyi School of Arts. 13 years engaged in Ukrainian dance because his father was a choreographer of the Ukrainian Dance Ensemble.

Nine years, Oleksandr dedicated to KVN. At 16 he became a member of Khmelnytskyi National University team. He takes part in the tournaments of the Association of KVN of Ukraine in the team "Stylish Wind" and "TM-TV". He played for the TV team of the Higher Ukrainian League KVN "Three fat women", the main part of which were experienced players. Having joined the team as a dancer, Pedan quickly became one of the leaders, an active participant in the creative process – writing texts, setting numbers. He participated in a number of international festivals of the Club (Sochi, Jurmala).

In 2006 Oleksandr became the leading Comedy Club UA, as well as a member of the club's weekly parties and TV broadcasts. The bright individual image of the entertainer gave him the creative pseudonym – Oleksandr "Angel" Pedan.

In 2008, Pedan became one of the leading morning show "Rise" on the Novyi Kanal in partnership with Freimuth and Prytula. This trinity of the leading is called one of the most successful all-time existence of the morning show on the Novyi Kanal. Together with Olga and Serhiy, Oleksandr led the "Rise" until May 2011.

2008 led TV show "Ukraine does not believe in tears" with Masha Efrosinina and Serhiy Prytula. 2010–2011 – became a participant of the show "Make me funny" with Serhiy Prytula, Masha Efrosinina, Dmitry Kolyadenko, Andriy Domansky, Anastasiya Kassilova and Sergey Kuzin.

2010–2011 – became the judge of the show "Sing, if you can" with the leading Serhiy Prytula and Masha Efrosinina. 2011 – became the leader of the extreme show "I am the Hero!" With Serhiy Prytula and the world champion in gymnastics Lilia Podkopaeva. In the same year, Oleksandr becomes the lead show "Intuition" – his first solo project on the Novyi Kanal.

2010 – became the creator and co-founder of the sports and music festival Z-games. By 2013, the festival was held within the Kazantip festival in Crimea, since 2014 it takes place in the Gulf of Odesa region. In 2015, this festival gathered a record number of sports enthusiasts – more than 10 thousand.

March–June 2012 – leads the show "Pack the suitcase". March 2012 – Oleksandr becomes a judge in the show "Who is the top?". The presenters of the project, Olha Freimut and Sehiy Prytula, are jokingly called Pedan "voice from above", "the supreme judge", because Oleksandr is not in the frame and viewers only hear his voice.

Summer 2012 – along with Freimut and Prytula leads the show "CabrioLito".

On March 10, 2013, the informal and entertaining evening project "Pedan-Prytula Show" was launched on the Novyi Kanal. Pedan became the lead and creative producer of the show, along with Serhiy Prytula. Since 2014, he has been running the Heart of Three project, having spent three seasons of this show.

2014–2015 – Leading in two seasons of the program "Cheap and Anger". In the show, Oleksandr had a task with humor to look for savings in all spheres.

In 2016, along with Dmitry Tankovich, he was the presenter of the National Selection for Eurovision in 2016, where Jamala won. In the fall of 2016 began work on the project "Stars under hypnosis".

== Television projects ==
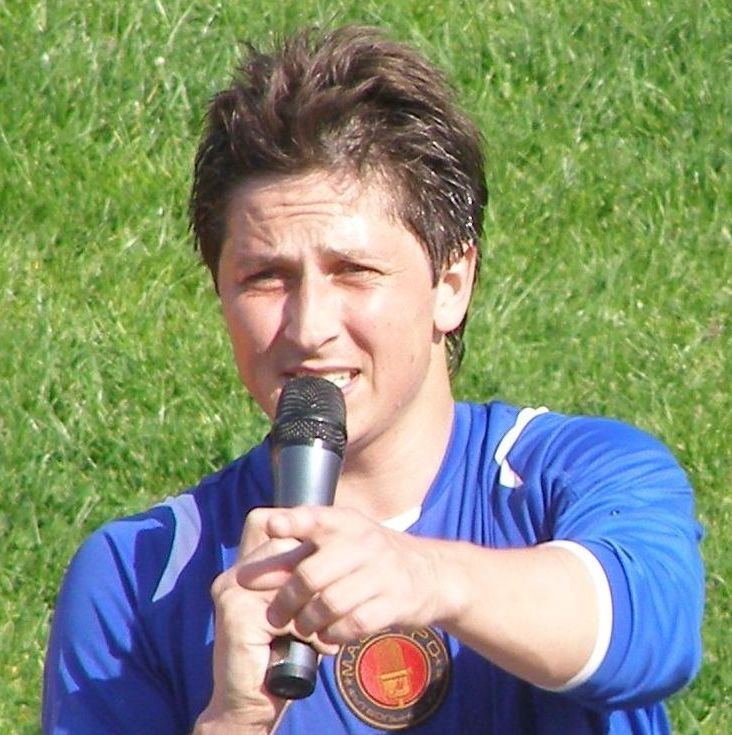
Oleksandr on the shootings

- Comedy Club UA
- "Uphill"
- "Make me funny"
- "Intuition"
- "Pack suitcase"
- "Who is on top?"
- "I am Hero!"
- Cabriolet
- Pedan-Prytula Shaw
- "Heart of Three 3"
- "Cheap and angry"
- "Eurovision-2016. Ukraine"
- "Stars under hypnosis"

== Public activity ==
- 2015 became the author and creator of the project to the Mother's Day "ATO Soldiers read poetry to their mothers"
- 2014 – Organized a concert on the Day of the Border Guard in the front-line zone
- 2016 – together with Oleg Skrypka and Sergey Prytula, supported the social project "Hour of Code", in which, among other things, the children of 130 Ukrainian schools learned IT programing.
- 2018 – recording videos in support of Oleg Sentsov, a Ukrainian prisoner

== Awards ==
- 2011 – Diploma nomination for Teletriumph in the nomination "morning broadcast" for the program "Rise"
