= Daria Kolomiec =

Ukrainian DJ and activist

Daria Kolomiec is a Ukrainian сultural activist, producer, and performer. Following the 2022 Russian invasion of Ukraine, she created the Diary of War Podcast which involved her collecting and editing voice memos from Ukrainians. It later evolved into a theatrical production that has been staged in New York, Washington D.C., Dublin, and Kyiv to raise funds for humanitarian aid and combat medics.
