= Masha Efrosynina =

Ukrainian television director

Maria Efrosynina
- Марія Єфросиніна
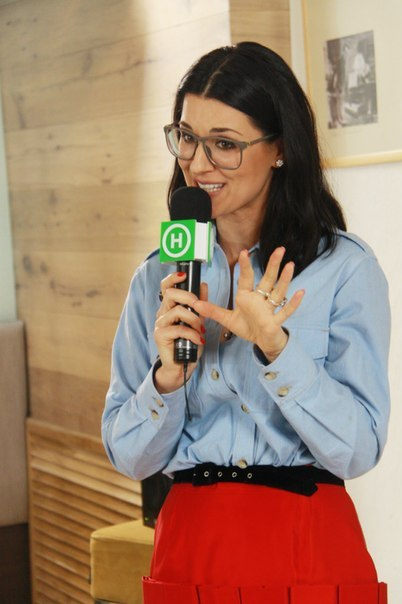
- Efrosinina in 2012
- Born: Mariia Oleksandrivna Yefrosynina; 25 May 1979 (age 47); Kerch, Ukrainian SSR, Soviet Union
- Education: Kyiv University
- Occupations: TV host; actress; entertainer
- Known for: hosting Eurovision Song Contest in 2005
- Spouse: Tymur Khromaiev (m. 2003)
- Children: Nana (daughter); Oleksandr (son)
- Parents: Oleksandr (father); Liudmyla (mother)
- Relatives: Yelyzaveta (sister); Andriy Yushchenko (brother-in-law)
- Awards: Best TV Hostess 2004

Maria Oleksandrivna Efrosynina (Ukrainian: Марія Олександрівна Єфросиніна; born 25 May 1979), professionally known as Masha Efrosynina (Ukrainian: Маша Єфросиніна), is a Ukrainian television host and media personality. Along with Pavlo Shylko, she hosted the 50th edition of the Eurovision Song Contest.

In 2018, Maria became the United Nations Population Fund Goodwill Ambassador.

== Biography ==
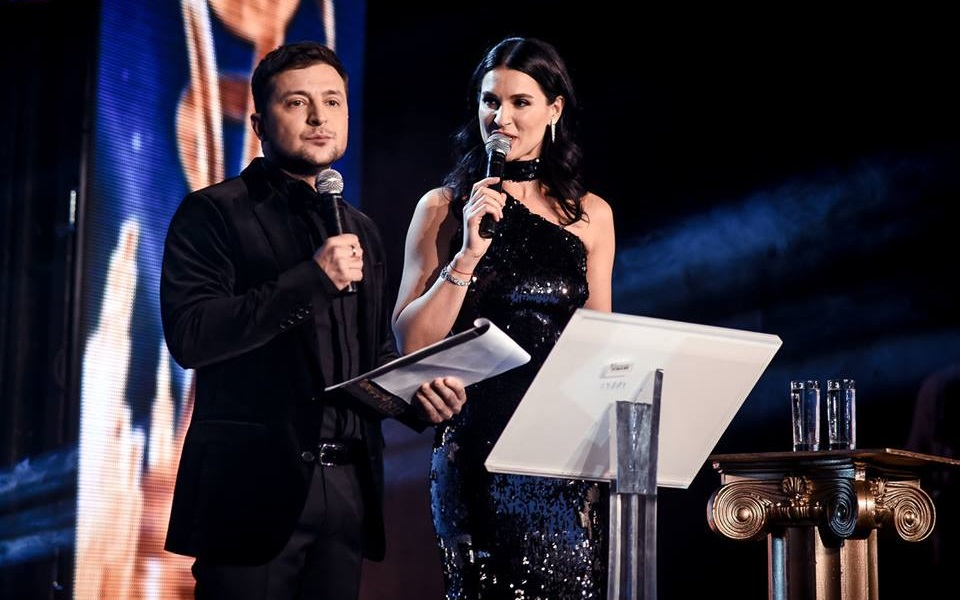
Efrosynina (right), cohosted Teletriumph 2016 with Volodymyr Zelenskyy (left). The Teletriumphs are the national television awards of Ukraine. Teletriumph 2016 was held at Freedom Hall in Kyiv, and was not televised.

Graduating from high school with a gold medal (an honour roll), Efrosinina enrolled in the Department of Foreign Languages in the Kyiv University, graduating as an interpreter of the English and Spanish languages.

At 19 she debuted on the First National channel in the program Happy Bell. In 2002 she received the Teletriumph prize in the nomination the Best TV show.

She co-presented the 50th Eurovision Song Contest alongside Pavlo Shylko, in 2005 from Kyiv's Sports Palace, to a pan-European TV-audience of an estimated 150 million people. She has also co-presented the UEFA Euro 2012 draw held at the Palace of Culture and Science in Warsaw, on 7 February 2010.

She presented Fabryka Zirok, the Ukrainian version of Star Academy, with co-host Andriy Domanskyi, on Novyi Kanal.

On 18 November 2010, Efrosinina placed the 77th place among the most influential females in Ukraine according to the Ukrainian magazine Focus.

On 27 March 2022, Efrosinina co-hosted with Timur Miroshnychenko at Save Ukraine - #StopWar on 1+1.

== Personal life ==
Maria got married in 2003 to Tymur Khromaiev, an Ossetian-Ukrainian, son of the president of Ukrainian basketball league Zurab Khromaiev.

Husband

Tymur Khromaiev is a graduate of the Finance Department of Union College (New York) with bachelors in economics. Tymur Khromaiev is a representative of a financial consulting company that cooperated with Naftogaz Ukrainy in its restructuring. Since 2002 he is director of his own investment company "ARTA" that works in a field of corporate financing, investment banking, brokerage, and assets management.

=== Yelyzaveta Yushchenko ===
Her sister Yelyzaveta, who is two years younger, married Andriy Yushchenko, son of the former Ukrainian president Viktor Yushchenko. She also graduated Kyiv University (2009) department of psychology and now works as specialist in a child psychology. On 10 March 2010 the young Yushchenko family increased in size by a girl, Varvara.

== Awards ==
- Order of Merit, Third Class (2020)

== See also ==
- List of Eurovision Song Contest presenters

Preceded by (Turkey) Meltem Cumbul & Korhan Abay	Eurovision Song Contest presenter (with Pavlo Shylko); 2005	Succeeded by (Greece) Sakis Rouvas & Maria Menounos
