= Volodymyr Dantes =

Volodymyr Dantes Володимир Дантес
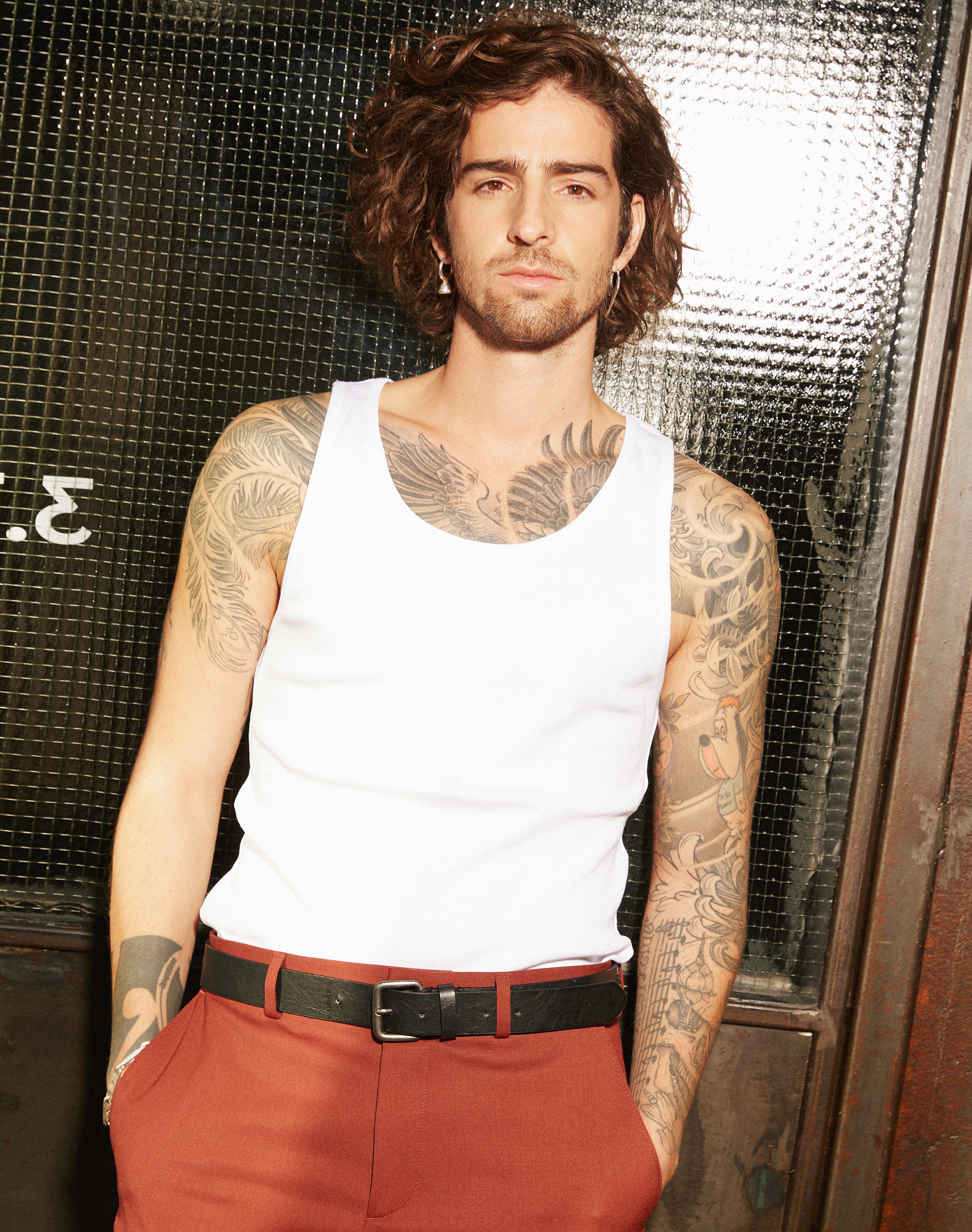

Background information
- Born: Volodymyr Ihorovych Hudkov; Володимир Ігорович Гудков; June 28, 1988 (age 37); Kharkiv, Ukrainian SSR
- Genres: rock, pop-punk, glam-rock
- Occupations: TV personality, radio personality, singer
- Instrument: Vocal
- Years active: 2008–present
- Formerly of: DiO.filmy
- Spouse: Nadia Dorofeeva (m. 2015–2022)
- Partner: Dasha Katsurina

Volodymyr Ihorovych Hudkov (Ukrainian: Володимир Ігорович Гудков; born 28 June 1988), known professionally as Volodymyr Dantes (Володимир Дантес), is a Ukrainian singer, TV and radio personality. He is currently a solo-singer under the name of Dantes and was a member of the band "DiO.filmy"(Ukrainian: ДіО.Фільми).

== Biography ==
=== Early years ===
He was born to a Jewish mother, and he has a Star of David tattoo. His Christian father is a policeman. Attended Kharkiv's school № 36. Graduated from a music school in Kharkiv and studied economics at the Kharkiv Polytechnic Institute ("Financial management of business" faculty).

== DiO.filmy ==
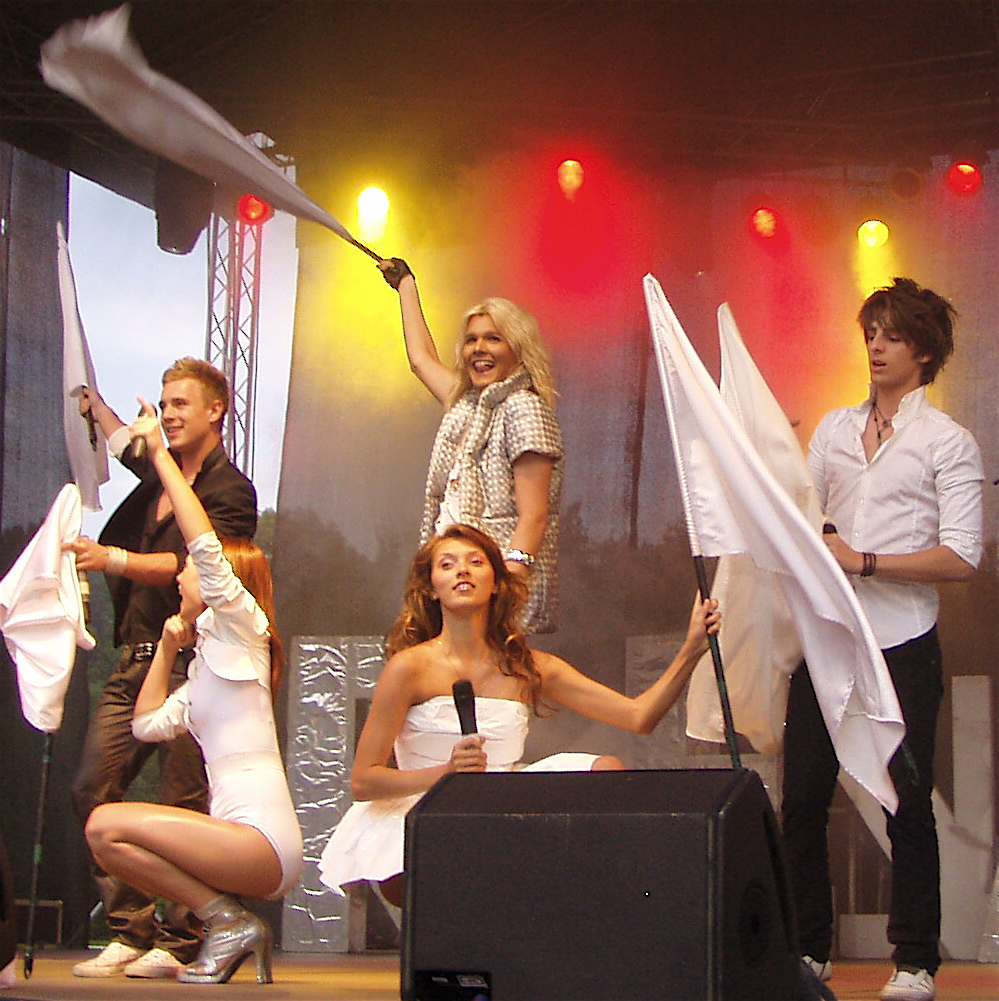
Tour «Fabryka v tvoiemu misti», 2010

In November of 2008 together with Vadym Oliinyk won in "Fabryka Zirok-2", forming a duet "Dantes & Oliinyk". Borys Bronshtein and Natalia Mohylevska became their producers with the centre "Talant Group". On 4 March 2010 they released their debut album "Mne uzhe 20".

=== Singles ===
- 2009 – Мне уже 20 (Russian: Мне уже 20, romanized: Mne uzhe dvadzat', lit. 'I'm 20 already')
- 2010 – Rington (Рингтон, 'Ringtone')
- 2011 – Ty zria yemu dala (Ты зря ему дала, 'You gave it to him in vain')
- 2012 – Otkrytaya rana (Открытая рана, 'An open wound')
- 2012 – Medlyak (Медляк, 'Power ballade')
- 2013 – Naoborot (Наоборот, 'The other way')

The band disbanded in April 2015, with Dantes choosing to continue as a TV and radio personality.

== Career ==
=== Radio ===
Dantes is a radio personality of a Ukrainian radio station "Lux FM".

=== Television ===
Dantes often starred on various television programs on Ukrainian and a few Russian TV channels.

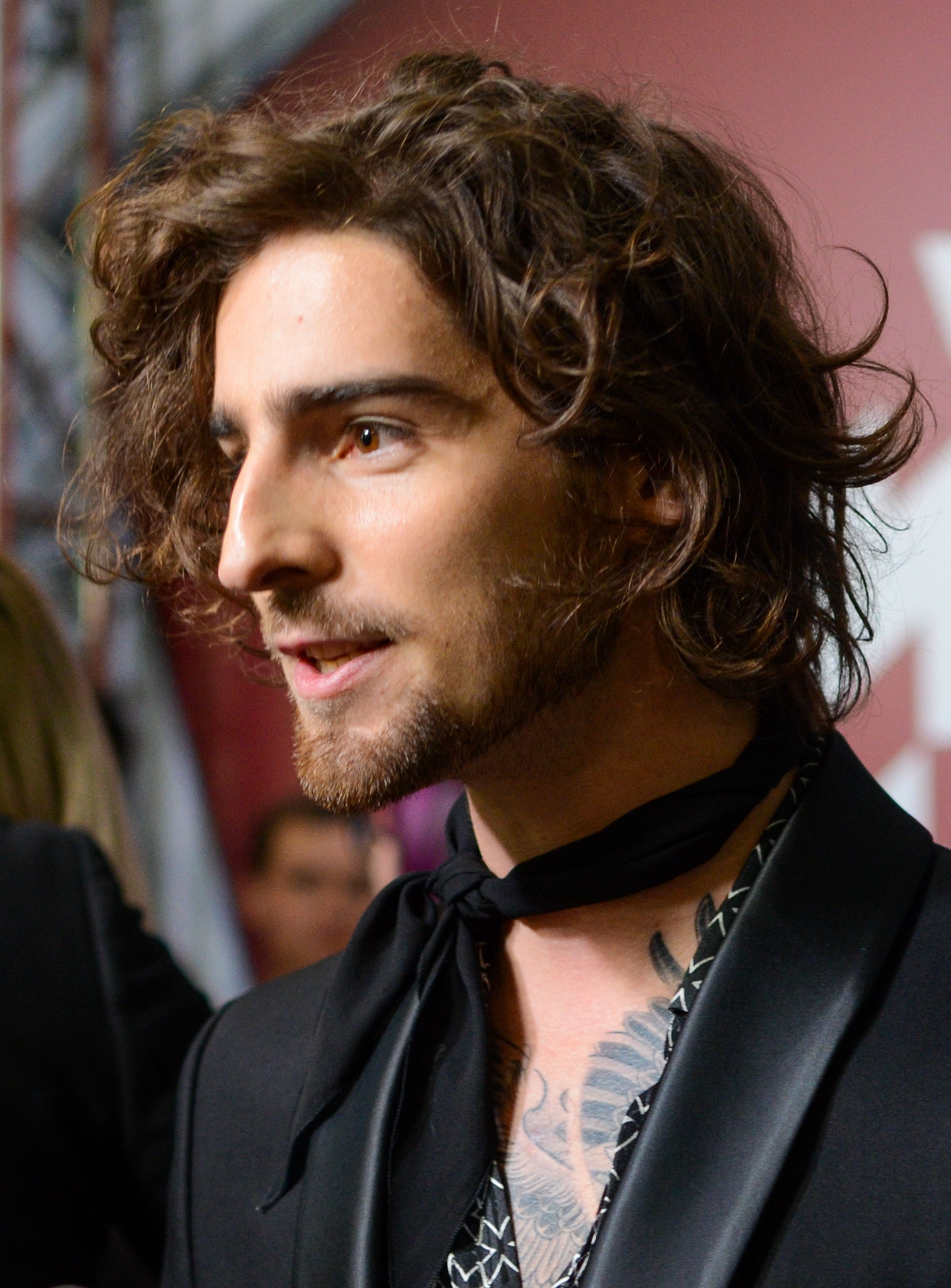
Dantes in 2019

Since October 2012, he has been hosting the "Blyzhche do tila" program together with Victoria Batui on the Novyi Kanal. In 2014–2015 Dantes was the host of the culinary travel show "Yizha, ya lyublyu tebe" on the "Friday!" Russian TV channel. Since 11 October 2015 Dantes was one of the coaches of the children's talent show "Malenki hihanty" on the 1+1 TV channel. He was a guest star in the fourth season of the show "Liga Smikhu" in 2018 and a coach-joker in the fifth season of the same show in 2019. In 2021 was a judge of the show "Masquerade" on "1+1", and in 2022–2023 was host of the show "Ya lyublyu Ukrayinu" on the "TET" TV channel.

=== YouTube ===
In 2021 Dantes started his first YouTube show "Stand up 380", in which he aims to introduce interesting Ukrainian comedians and to popularise Ukrainian stand-up among a wider audience.

Between 2020 and 2022 Dantes hosted the project "Mama, ya delayu bizness"(Мама, я делаю бизнес, 'Mama, I do business'), the purpose of which was to talk about Ukrainian startups, introduce their founders, and show how Ukrainian local businesses develop.

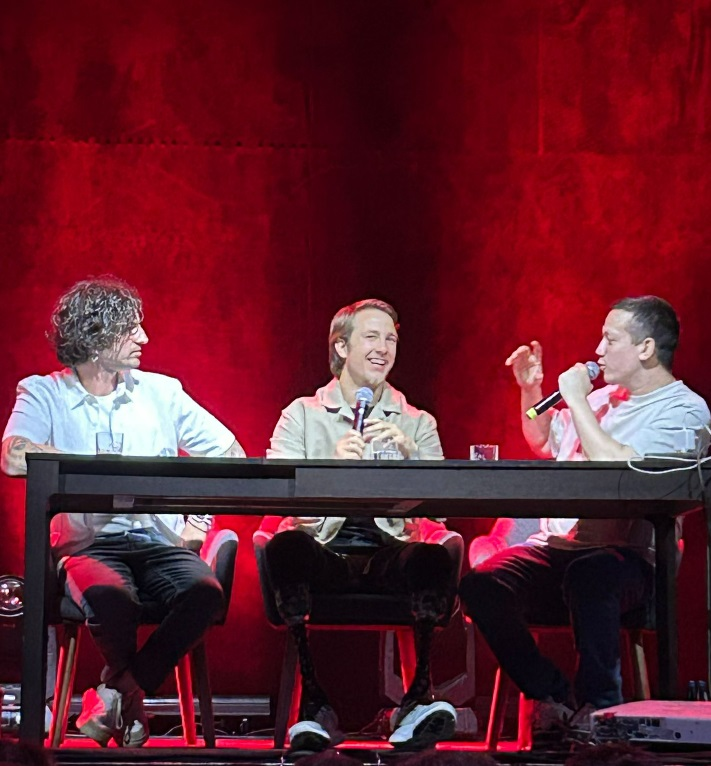
Volodymyr Dantes on the left in the TV show "Pozhezha" in Kraków, 2024

In 2022–2023 Dantes was the host of the travel show "Mama ya haniayu tachky" (Мама, я ганяю тачки, 'Mama, I drive cars') the goal of which was to deliver cars from Europe to Ukraine to help the military. According to him, during the program, "people, businesses, programs, volunteer hubs that continue to do something cool for Ukraine" are filmed.

In 2023 Dantes started the "Budynok Kultury" (Будинок культури, 'House of culture') project, which is filmed in the de-occupied territories. The goal of the project is to revive the Ukrainian culture and remind it to Ukrainians. In each episode, Volodymyr and an invited guest organize a concert, creating "revivals in the houses of culture".

=== Musical solo career ===
In 2021 Dantes released his first solo-album "Tvoya lubimaya muzika" (Твоя любимая музыка, 'Your favorite music'). Multiple Ukrainian musical artists Dorofeeva, Jerry Heil, Potap, Maxim Fadeev took part in the album.

In 2022 Dantes released singles "Obiimy" (Обійми, 'Hug[me]'), "Not a refugee" and "Tilky my" (Тільки ми, 'Only us').

In 2023 he released the single "Chuiesh" and the second solo album "KITY" (КИТИ, 'WHALES'), which included the new tracks "Chuiesh" (Чуєш, '[You]Hear'), "Kyty" (Кити, 'Whales'), "My ne odyn narod" (Ми не один народ, 'We are not one people'), "Buty z toboyu" (Бути з тобою, 'To be with you'), "Kolyskova" (Колискова, 'Lullaby') and the translation of the singles "Devochka Olya" (Твоя любимая музыка, 'Your favorite music'), "Sasha" (Саша), "Grustnye tantsy" (Грустные танці, 'Sad dances').

In August 2024, he released a duet, "Huby u hubakh" with Ukrainian singer, Jerry Heil. The song peaked at No. 14 on Ukraine's top 20 singles chart.

== Discography ==
- Tvoya liubimaya muzyka (Твоя любимая музыка, 'Your favorite music', 2021)
- Kiti (Кити, 'Whales', 2023)

== Personal life ==
On 8 July 2015 Dantes married Vryema i Steklo's member Nadiya Dorofeeva. They got divorced in 2022. Since September 2022, he has been in a relationship with Dasha Katsurina.

== Music videos ==
№	Name	Year	Director
1	«Теперь Тебе 30»	2019	Leonid Kolossovskiy
2	«Более или Менее»	2020	Leonid Kolossovskiy
3	«Одноклассница»	2020	Leonid Kolossovskiy
4	«ЕСЛИ БЫ»	2020	Leonid Kolossovskiy
5	"Грустные танцы"	2021	Leonid Kolossovskiy
6	"Обійми"	2022	
7	"Not a refugee"	2022	
8	"Чуєш"	2023	Yulia Paskal
9	"Кити"	2023	Yulia Paskal
10	"ГУБИ У ГУБАХ" with Jerry Heil	2024	Yura Katynsky
11	"Pуда вода"	2024	Pavel Buryak
