= Television in Ukraine =

Television has a long history in Ukraine, where regular television broadcasting started during the Soviet years in 1951. However the first ever TV broadcast took place on 1 February 1939 in Kyiv. Since then TV broadcasting has expanded, particularly after the fall of Communism in 1989, and now there are many different channels and groups in the Ukrainian TV market.

== History ==
=== Experimental broadcasts during World War II ===
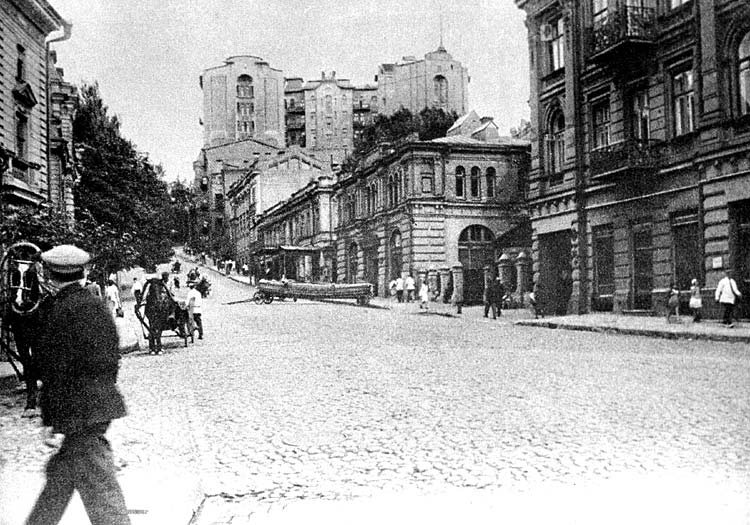
View of the first house where experimental television was broadcast in Ukraine in 1939, at Instytutska 2, several blocks down from the looming Ginsburg Skyscraper in the background. Most of the buildings seen here were destroyed by Soviet bombs in 1941.

The first official direct broadcast took place in Kyiv on 1 February 1939 at Instytutska 2 on the corner of Instytutska Street and Khreshchatyk Street. It was 40 minutes long and showed the portrait of Sergo Ordzhonikidze. This broadcast was experimental, and can today only be considered as an appendix to the radio. The image was no bigger than 3 x 4 centimeters, and extremely low resolution. These broadcasts could only be seen by a select few people in Ukraine, as most citizens did not have access to a device that could see the image. The Ukrainian television industry, while it recognizes the accomplishments of the house at Instytutska 2, does not officially recognize this as the birth of Ukrainian television, because the broadcasts were irregular, experimental, and did not last long.

The majority of Khreshchatyk was destroyed by deliberately placed Soviet secret service mines targeting the German forces in 1941, during the height of the war and the withdrawal of Soviet forces from the city. Few structures remained standing. One of the few structures that had even remotely survived the bombs and fires were some of the walls of the former complex at Khreshchatyk 26, although most of the building had been completely destroyed. A new structure would be built using its original walls.

=== The Kyiv TV and Radio Center and the birth of Ukrainian television ===
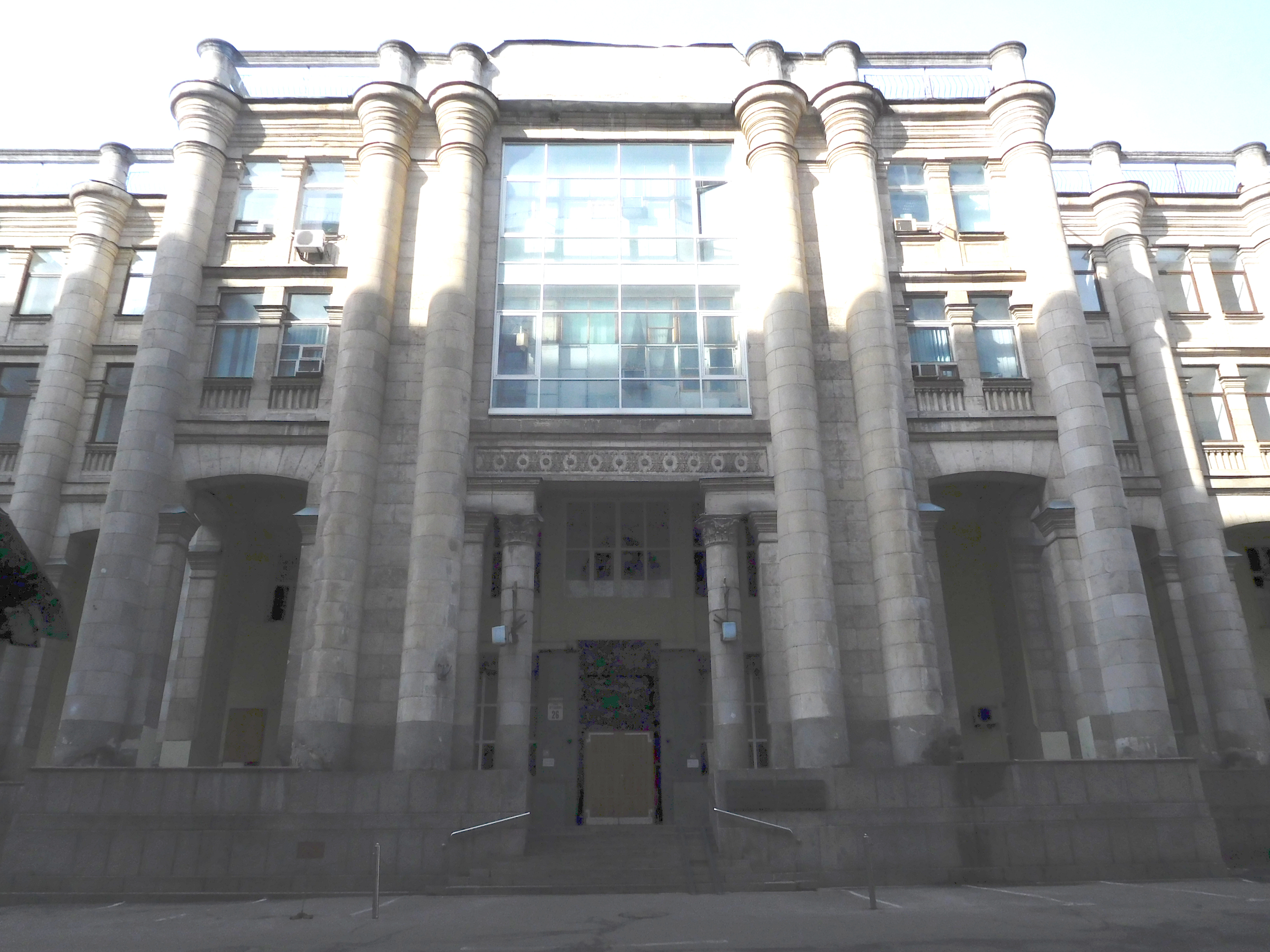
In 1952, the first regular television broadcasts were transmitted from the Kyiv Television and Radio Center

On December 15, 1948, the Council of Ministers of the Ukrainian SSR and the Central Committee of the Communist Party of the Soviet Union created a resolution that the Ukrainian headquarters of a TV station should be built in Kyiv. At an amount of 43 million rubles, Joseph Stalin authorized the construction of a new Ukrainian headquarters for official Soviet television and radio broadcasting. On April 18, 1949, the executive committee of the Kyiv City Council announced the groundbreaking construction of the new building.

The first television experiments elsewhere in the then-SSR happened in Kharkiv on 7 May 1951, where the phrase "Attention! Kharkiv talks and sees" was heard.

On 6 November 1951, transmissions resumed when the Kyiv Television and Radio Center was opened with a live broadcast of the patriotic movie The Great Glow. The 6th of November has been officially recognized as the birthday of Ukrainian television. The next day the telecentre went on the air again celebrating the 34th anniversary of the October Revolution with a special live broadcast from central Kyiv, the first outdoor broadcasts in Ukrainian TV history.

In the early years of Ukrainian television, all programming was produced exclusively within the studio. Initially located at 26 Khreshchatyk Street, the Kyiv studio operated with just two, and later three, television cameras. Even with this limited setup, it was already possible to air segments from theatrical performances, concerts, and news bulletins.

On 1 May 1952, Labor Day, a live concert was aired on film (shot in the small and only pavilion of the studios known as "Studio B") starring Ukrainian singers, soloists of the Kyiv Taras Shevchenko Opera Theater. The anchorwoman of the concert was the Kyiv Telecentre's first announcer – Novela Serpionova. The first three television presenters in the history of Ukraine were, in order; Novela Serpionova and Olga Danylenko in 1952, and Olena Nikolaeva in 1953. Nikolaeva replaced Serpionova when she returned to radio broadcasting in 1953. Because Serpionova left before a full year was out, she was largely forgotten by most Ukrainian viewers, and her status as the first television presenter in Ukraine was not recognized until the 60th anniversary of Ukrainian television.

May 30, 1954, during the celebrations of the 300th anniversary of the Pereiaslav Council, which commemorated the "reunification" of Ukraine with Russia, history was made. On that day, the first true outdoor broadcast of Ukrainian television took place: a live TV broadcast aired live from the Kyiv Opera and Ballet Theater, where an official ceremony was held as part of the tricentennial celebrations. The broadcast was conducted using the PTS-49 outside broadcasting van—one of the first mobile broadcast units developed in the Soviet Union, based largely on an earlier American model. Although transmissions remained in black and white, the PTS-49 OB vans significantly expanded television's reach beyond the studio walls. This advancement enabled live coverage from stadiums, sports events, factories, exhibitions, and collective farms—marking what could be considered the true beginning of Ukrainian television as a public medium.

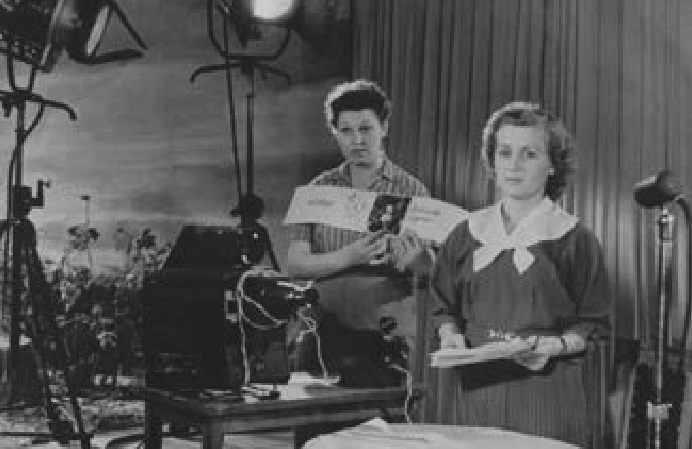
Olga Danylenko (left) and Olena Nikolaeva (right) had to completely memorize their lines before broadcasts. They are widely thought of as the first television presenters in Ukraine.

Regular programming started to go on air beginning November 1956. Until that year, the Kyiv TV Station went on air twice a day showing feature films or documentaries on a test basis. Live broadcasting was the only form of broadcasting during those early years from Kyiv, as well as relays from Moscow via Smolensk and Rostov-on-Don transmitters and film sent from there. Videotaped productions (save for news programming and special coverages that were aired live) became the usual form for many productions in the mid-1960s.

It was not until 1959 that Kyiv's television studio presented its first program on central Soviet television. Because of the lack of infrastructure, this required transporting scenery, equipment, presenters, and technical staff to Moscow by several freight wagons—a major logistical effort.

=== Expansion to other cities ===
Following Kyiv's lead, attention turned to other Ukrainian cities. In Kharkiv, television pioneers led by engineer V.S. Vovchenko conducted trial broadcasts as early as 1951, converting part of the city's House of State Industry into studios and technical facilities. In 1955, Kharkiv completed a television tower, enabling the launch of a local television studio.

Other cities soon followed. By early 1955, TV studios and proper broadcasting facilities were being built or planned in Stalino (now Donetsk), Dnipropetrovsk (Dnipro), Odesa, Lviv, and Yalta. Meanwhile, Chernihiv, Zaporizhzhia, Voroshylovhrad, and Kryvyi Rih were designated to host relay stations, connecting them to primary TV hubs.

By the early 1960s, ten regional capitals across Ukraine had established their own television operations. However, these studios functioned independently, lacking relay lines to interconnect them. Even Kyiv's broadcasts remained disconnected from central television in Moscow.

As a result of an ongoing expansion of broadcasts to other parts of Ukraine through the building of remote studios and broadcast transmitters, it was needed for DerTelRadio, the State Committee for Television and Radio Broadcasting, operators of the TV service, to consider stating nationwide broadcasts, coupled with the future launch of satellite broadcasting. The long-awaited national channel, bearing the name Ukrainian Television, signed on at last on January 20, 1965, under the name UA:1 (UT-1), while on March 6, 1972, a second channel, UA:2 (UT-2), signed on - on the basis of part of the original 1956 channel. Its launch was approved by the Central Committee of the Communist Party of the Soviet Union, formalizing a two-channel arrangement for Ukrainian television broadcasting. The UT network switched to SECAM Colour in 1976, its 25th anniversary, ending a transition period that began in 1968.

Under the 1972 arrangement that created UT-2, certain regional transmitters were dedicated exclusively to relaying TV broadcasts from Moscow transmitters of Soviet Central Television via microwave links and the then new satellite broadcasting feeds, while others were reserved, often with lower priority, for republican or Ukrainian television programming beamed from Kyiv studios and transmitters through the same manner, with many all-Union events simulcast on all stations. Prior to this, Ukrainian television operated under a single-channel model under regional lines. Even after the change, the many local broadcasters often had to interrupt or block Moscow programming to air their own local content, a practice that increasingly displeased Soviet authorities.

In 1976, the 1972 arrangement was amended with the launch of UT-3, the third national channel of Ukrainian Television.

=== Modern technologies ===
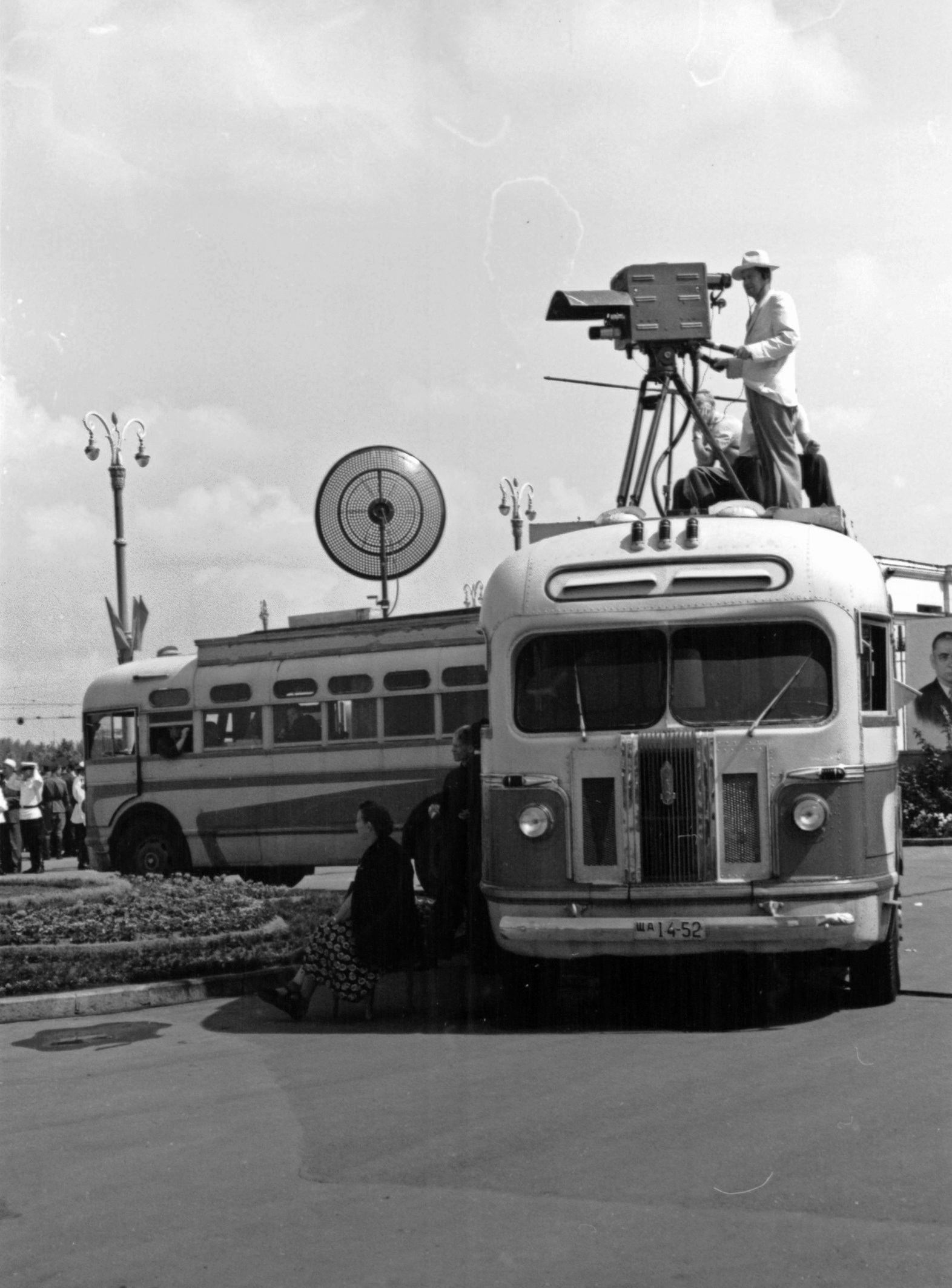
Mobile TV station from the first Kiev TV center on the streets of Kyiv.

In the late 1980s and into the early 1990s, the practice of organizing international television bridges (live broadcast dialogues between studios in different countries) gained significant popularity. These programs symbolized a new era of openness during the period of Gorbachev's glasnost, which eased restrictions on international communication across the former Iron Curtain. Between approximately 1987 and 1990, the Kyiv television studio organized around 20 such international teleconferences. These included exchanges with studios in Buckingham, Winnipeg, Kolkata, and others.

During the 1980 Moscow Olympics, not only was the event reported on from Kyiv, but correspondents from Kyiv were also present in Moscow, contributing to the broader broadcast efforts.

By this time, the Kyiv studio had established itself as the central hub of Ukrainian television. It coordinated and integrated the work of 14 regional television studios, forming a single, unified creative and production network. The Kyiv studio alone was responsible for producing up to 18 hours of original programming each day. However, the availability of cinematic content was limited; typically, only one feature film per day was broadcast, sourced from the national film distribution system.

The original Kyiv television center maintained a wide variety of editorial departments, each specializing in a particular area of programming—ranging from children's and youth content to educational, scientific, and cultural broadcasts. This diversification ensured that television reached all segments of the audience with relevant and engaging material. Notably, a substantial portion of the programming was produced in the Ukrainian language.

=== Ukrainian Independence and the new Kyiv Television Center ===
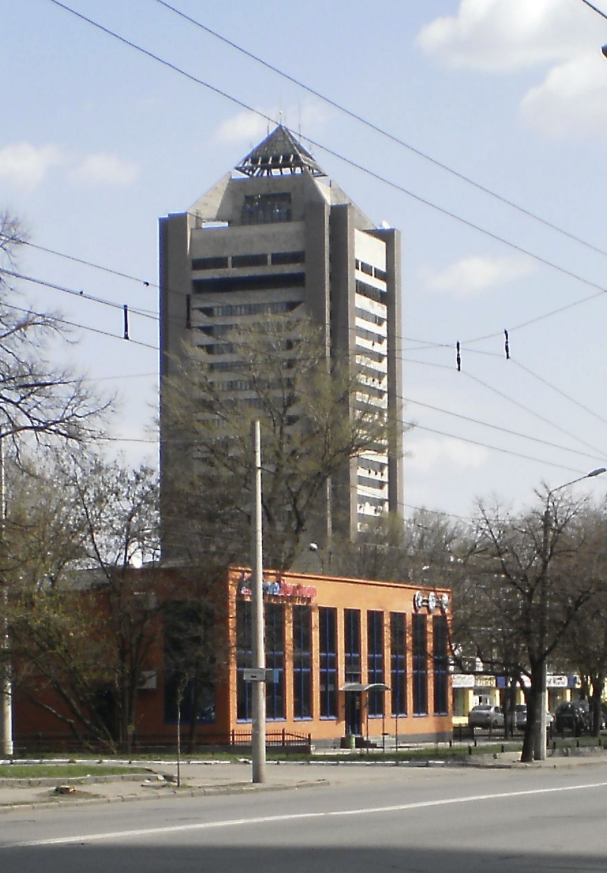
The Kyiv Television Center, also called "The Pencil," is the official headquarters of UA:1.

Shortly after the Dissolution of the Soviet Union, and the 1991 Ukrainian independence referendum, Ukrainian public television moved from its former headquarters, the Kyiv Television and Radio Center, into the Kyiv Television Center in 1992. This building was for many years the 6th tallest structure in Ukraine. Up until then, Ukraine had three national channels, inherited from Soviet rule: the First Programme of Soviet Central Television, which would become Channel One Russia, the Second Programme, which would become RTR, and the autonomous Ukrainian Programme. After independence, the channels were realigned into the UT-1 (UT), UT-2 (RTR) and UT-3 (ORT) networks, then on 1 January 1992, UT-2 began broadcasting as an independent channel. On 26 September of that year, UT-3 started broadcasting on weekends and Mondays on UT-2 after 7pm. A series of private local stations appeared in this timeframe.

In 1995, Zinovy Kulyk, then head of the State Committee for Television and Radio Broadcasting, issued a directive that restructured the distribution of television channel signals across transmitters. The aim was to prioritize Ukrainian-produced content on national television. As a result, programs originating from Ukraine began to dominate the airwaves, while programming from Russia's Ostankino gradually disappeared. This was a turning point in the formation of a fully autonomous Ukrainian broadcasting landscape and shaped the identity of what would become the First National Channel.

The National Council for Television and Radio Broadcasting, between 1995 and 2006 had issued over 2,000 licenses for various broadcasters across the country. The introduction and expansion of cable television and cable infrastructure allowed for the development of a diverse, multi-channel environment, giving Ukrainian viewers access to a broader range of programming.

=== Orange Revolution ===
After the Orange Revolution, Ukrainian television became more free. In February 2009 the National Council for Television and Radio Broadcasting claimed that "political pressure on mass media increased in recent times through amending laws and other normative acts to strengthen influence on mass media and regulatory bodies in this sphere".

As of January 2009, Ukrainian Prime Minister, Yulia Tymoshenko refused to appear in Inter TV-programmes "until journalists, management and owners of the TV channel stop destroying the freedom of speech and until they remember the essence of their profession - honesty, objectiveness, and unbiased stand".

=== Revolution of Dignity and Post-2014 Events ===
In early March 2014, Ukraine-based TV channels were removed in Crimea ahead of the Russian annexation referendum. Later that month, the Ukrainian National Council for TV and Radio Broadcasting ordered measures against some Russian TV channels accused of broadcasting misleading information about Ukraine. In parts of Donetsk and Luhansk oblasts, where the separatists gained control during the protests and the War in Donbas, they took over local TV stations, which allowed them to broadcast Russian and pro-separatist channels, resulting in the shutdown of Ukrainian TV transmissions.

In February 2015 the law "On protection information television and radio space of Ukraine," banned the showing (on Ukrainian television) of "audiovisual works" that contain "popularization, propaganda, any action of law enforcement agencies, armed forces, other military or security forces of an invader" was enacted. One year later Russian productions (on Ukrainian television) had decreased by 300 to 400 percent. 15 more Russian TV channels were banned in March 2016.

According to the Decree of the Cabinet of Ministers of Ukraine No.509 dated June 13, 2018, analogue broadcasting was disconnected on the territory of Kirovohrad Oblast and Kyiv from July 31, 2018. The date of the switch-off of analogue broadcasting on the rest of Ukraine is August 31, 2018

A Research & Branding Group February 2021 poll found that for the first time Ukrainians preferred the Internet as their primary news source instead of television (51% preferred the Internet and 41% TV).

== Timeline of Ukrainian public TV broadcasting history ==
=== Early Development (1939–1950s) ===
- 1939: The first experimental television broadcast in Kyiv occurred on February 1, featuring a 40-minute transmission of photographs of Sergo Ordzhonikidze from a small studio in central Kyiv.
- 1951: Marks the beginning of the modern era of Ukrainian television. Trial airings occurred on November 5, 6, and 7:
  - November 5: Airing of the film "Alitet Leaves for the Mountains."
  - November 6: Propaganda film "Velyka Zahrava" (The Great Glow) aired - marked as Official Birthday of Ukrainian Television
  - November 7: First live broadcast — coverage of the October Revolution civil-military parade from Khreshchatyk Street.
- 1952: The first television announcers appeared: Olga Danylenko, Elena Nikolaeva, and Novella Serpionova.
- 1954: The first outside broadcasting van (PTS-52) was introduced, enabling live coverage of major events, including the 300th anniversary of the Pereyaslav Council and a Dynamo Kyiv football match.

=== Institutional Growth and Expansion (1960s–1980s) ===
- 1956: Launch of the first news broadcasts and the formation of the Kyiv Experimental Television Theater.
- 1963: Introduction of "Evening Tale," the Soviet Union's first daily children's television program, hosted for 25 years by Panas (Petro Vesklyarov).
- 1965: Introduction of the "UT" brand and establishment of a unified republican television service with UT-1.
- 1968: Kyiv Television Center became the first in Ukraine to transmit color broadcasts using the SECAM standard; Tamara Stratienko hosted the first color broadcast.
- 1972: Launch of UT-2 television channel.
- 1976: Launch of UT-3.
- 1980: Introduction of portable Betacam video equipment for field journalism.

=== Independence Era and International Integration (1990s–2000s) ===
- 1991: Formation of the State TV and Radio Company of Ukraine following the country's independence.
- 1993: Ukraine's state broadcaster became a full member of the European Broadcasting Union, enabling participation in international events such as the Eurovision Song Contest and the Olympic Games.
- 1995: Reorganization into the National Television Company of Ukraine (NTKU) and rebranding as First National (Pershyi Natsionalnyi), pursuant to Presidential Decree No. 12.
- 2002: Satellite broadcasting began in cooperation with the National Space Agency of Ukraine, expanding global reach.
- 2008: NTKU initiated internet broadcasting of its programming.

=== Transition to Public Broadcasting (2015–Present) ===
- April 7, 2015: Enactment of legislation establishing public broadcasting in Ukraine.
- January 19, 2017: Official formation of the Public Broadcasting Company of Ukraine (NSTU) as a public joint-stock company, marking the completion of the transition from state-controlled to independent public broadcasting.

== Digital television ==
In 2007 and 2008, experimental DVB-T broadcasts of few channels started in Kyiv and Odesa. Those turned out to be successful. Yet the DTT National Program is not approved by the government, thus the process is stuck. Because there are two versions of the program submitted: from the Ministry of Transport and Communications as well as from the State Committee of Television and Radio, there is no particular progress in 2008.

On 26 November 2008, the National Program of the Ministry was approved, but the final version and the public announcement of this fact is still on hold. Current version of the program does not take into notice any kind of Government financing, and the budget is to be private only, which will highly affect the TV industry and commercial broadcasters.

Besides there are 3rd parties, such as Television Industry Committee and National Association of Broadcasters which represent the communities of National and regional broadcasters respectively. Both organizations help the switchover not to affect the business of over 20 National and over 150 regional broadcasters.

The International Forum 'Digital Broadcasting in Ukraine' is the annual event that takes place in Kyiv, Ukraine. Its mission is to gather the most of international consultants and Ukrainian specialists to solve industry's problems in the DTT field. In 2008 the 2nd International Forum took place in Kyiv also. BBC, Deloitte and the Ministry of Communications of Finland representatives share the vision of possible plan of DTT implementation in Ukraine, delivering the best experiences from UK, Finland, France and US. Still none was taken into notice yet. It is now confirmed that Ukraine's national terrestrial TV network, which is scheduled to be launched in September 2011, will use the DVB-T2 standard for all four nationwide FTA multiplexes, for both SD and HD broadcasts. Before settling for DVB-T2, Ukraine was testing both DVB-T/MPEG-2 and DVB-T/MPEG-4 options, and some experimental transmitters operating in those standards are still alive.

== Other technologies ==
Commercial MMDS digital TV services work in Kyiv and some other cities.

DVB-C services delivering premium channels (in addition to standard analogue channels) launched in cable networks of Kyiv, Odesa, Kremenchuk, Poltava, Donetsk and some other cities.

== Broadcasting ==
As of February 2019, television broadcasting in Ukraine is available in a colour digital format, via:

- digital TV
- satellite TV
- cable television (Volia, regional operators)
- online services and IPTV (the most famous ones are Divan TV, Sweet TV, MEGOGO, Handy TV)

There is a choice between several free-to-air commercial broadcasters as well as the public broadcaster, the Suspilne. In addition to its metropolitan asset, Pershyi and an art station, Suspilne Kultura, the Suspilne also owns regional stations in all regions of Ukraine. A national parliamentary channel, Rada, is available too.

Commercial television is dominated by three major broadcasters: 1+1 media, StarLightMedia and Inter Media Group, which is the smallest Ukrainian major broadcaster. One of the main Ukrainian news channels, Channel 5, belongs to a former president of Ukraine, Petro Poroshenko.

Regional television in Ukraine consists primarily of independently owned networks not affiliated with major broadcasters in each region.

Subscription television consists of various providers. The largest providers are Kyivstar, Viasat and Volia. In remote areas, there are many small independent providers that provide either satellite or cable television services.

Community television launched in mid-2010s to broadcast Euromaidan protests. As of 2019, the sector is represented by Hromadske.tv which is an Internet television station.

== List of channels ==
=== DTT national channels ===
Public broadcasting
Channel	Owner	Established	Website
Pershyi	Suspilne	1951	https://suspilne.media/news/schedule/tv/
Suspilne Sport/ Suspilne Regional	Suspilne	2023/ varies	http://suspilne.media/sport http://corp.suspilne.media/regionalchannel
Suspilne Kultura	Suspilne	2002	http://suspilne.media/culture
Rada TV	Parliament of Ukraine	1999	http://tv.rada.gov.ua/
Army TV	Ministry of Defence of Ukraine	2023	http://armytv.com.ua/
Commercial
Channel	Owner	Established	Website
1+1 Marathon	1+1 media	1995	
1+1 Ukraine	1+1 media	2022	http://www.1plus1.ua/
Inter	Inter Media Group	1996	http://www.inter.ua/
ICTV	Starlight Media	1992	
ICTV2	Starlight Media	2022	http://www.ictv.ua/
2+2	1+1 media	2006	http://www.2plus2.ua/
NTN	Inter Media Group	2004	http://www.ntn.ua/
Novyi Kanal	Starlight Media	1998	http://www.novy.tv/
TET	1+1 media	1992	http://www.tet.tv/
K1	Inter Media Group	2005	http://www.k1.ua/
STB	Starlight Media	1997	http://www.stb.ua/
PlusPlus	1+1 media	2012	http://www.plus-plus.tv/
Bigudi	1+1 media	2014	http://www.bigudi.tv/
UNIAN. Serial	1+1 media	2010	http://www.unian.tv/
K2	Inter Media Group	2005	http://k2.ua/
Zoom	Inter Media Group	2007	http://zoomua.tv/
Mega	Inter Media Group	2005	http://megatv.ua/
Pixel TV	Inter Media Group	2012	http://pixelua.tv/
Enter-Film	Inter Media Group	2002	http://enterfilm.com.ua/
OCE	Starlight Media	2017	http://www.oce-tv.tv/
Super+	Starlight Media	2024	
5 kanal	Free Media Holding	2003	http://www.5.ua/
Pryamiy kanal	Free Media Holding	2017	http://www.prm.ua/
Espreso	Ivan Zhevago (77,5%) and Larysa Kniazhytska (22,5%)	2013	http://www.espreso.tv/
Megogo Sport	Megogo	2024	http://www.megogo.net/
Konkurent Ukraine	Group Konkurent	2025	http://www.konkurent.tv/
Sonce	Studio Pilot	2013	http://www.sonce.tv/
My-Ukraina+	Igor Petrenko (de jure); Andriy Yermak (de facto)	2024	http://www.weuaplus.tv/
Rozpakuy TV	Volodymyr Broslavets'	2020	http://www.rozpakuy.com/
Rozpakuy Hitline	Volodymyr Broslavets'	2026	
Tuso	Vira Simonova	2021	http://www.tuso.ua/

=== Satellite and cable ===
- English Club TV
- Music Box UA
- 8 channel
- EU Music
- 4ever Music
- BoutiqueTV
- Eko-TV
- Milady Television
- Pershyi Avtomobilny Channel
- 24 Kanal
- Nadiya (Hope Channel Ukraine)
- Sonce TV
- PORT-MONE TV
- Discovery Channel Ukraine
- TLC Ukraine
- National Geographic Channel Ukraine
- Nat Geo Wild Ukraine
- Da Vinci Learning Ukraine
- Deutsche Welle
- AMC
- FX
- FX Life

=== Local ===
- Kyiv 24 news
- Pershiy Zakhidniy
- ATR
- Lale
- Grad TV Odesa

=== International ===
- 1+1 International
- Inter+
- Dim (also broadcast in DTT local MUX in Lithuania)
- FreeDom (also broadcast in Tet Pay TV DTT in Latvia (before 31 December 2026), DTT in Estonia and local MUX in Lithuania)

== Criticism ==
Some political and public activists criticize Ukrainian television, mainly some national channels, for broadcasting large amounts of content of Russian origin. According to calculations of Boycott Russian Films activists, in September 2014 the amount of Russian productions on the leading Ukrainian channels ("Ukrayina", "ICTV", "NTN", "Novyi Kanal", "Inter", "STB", "2+2", "TET", "K1", "1+1") was approximately 40%. In October and December activists noticed increasing of amounts of Russian content on these channels, then Ukraine was at war with Russia.

Also activists criticise Ukrainian channels for their language policy. In October 2014 activists have published statistics on content language on Ukrainian channels. According to them, at the time 29% was completely Ukrainian language content, 39.3% completely Russian language content, 23.5% Russian language content with Ukrainian subtitles, and 8.2% bilingual content (both Ukrainian and Russian).

== 2019 Ukrainian presidential election ==
During the 2019 Ukrainian presidential election, various Ukrainian television channels supported a candidate for President of Ukraine.

Five groups supported Poroshenko:

- Petro Poroshenko's Channel 5 and Pryamiy supported Poroshenko and were very critical of Volodymyr Zelenskyy and Yulia Tymoshenko.
- Dmytro Firtash's very powerful Inter supported Yuriy Boyko and Poroshenko.
- Rinat Akhmetov's TRK Ukraina, which is owned by Akhmetov's System Capital Management Holdings, supported Poroshenko, Oleh Lyashko, and Oleksandr Vilkul. Akhmetov's Opposition Bloc nominated Vilkul.
- Viktor Medvedchuk's Channel 112 and Yevheniy Murayev's NewsOne supported Poroshenko, Lyashko, and Boyko. Medvedchuk's Opposition Platform — For Life nominated Boyko. The godfather of Medvedchuk's daughter is Vladimir Putin.
- Petro Dyminskyi's ZIK supported Poroshenko's allies allowing them to explain their story while they were under investigation.

Three TV groups were very critical of Poroshenko:

- Ihor Kolomoisky's 1+1 media group supported Volodymyr Zelenskyy. Kolomoisky and Zelenskyy are business partners.
- Andriy Sadovyi's Channel 24, supported Anatoliy Hrytsenko and opposed Poroshenko.
- Yevheniy Murayev's Nash TV supported Vilkul and was against Poroshenko but neutral to Tymoshenko and Lyashko.

Under the state-owned National Public Broadcasting Company, UA:Pershyi was critical of Poroshenko.

Victor Pinchuk's ICTV, Novyi Kanal and STB were neutral.

== 2022 Russian invasion of Ukraine ==
The United News TV Marathon

Since the start of the invasion on 24 February 2022, most Ukrainian television channels switched over to the signal of Rada TV. The channel was made state-owned at the end of 2021. Following 26 February 2022, the four biggest broadcasters including the TV channels Pershyi, 1+1, ICTV and Inter began broadcasting a 24/7 united newscast called United News (Єдині новини) that is produced in turn by the various channels and amended with official information by governmental agencies to "objectively and promptly provide comprehensive information from different regions of the country 24/7". However, the channel has been criticized by Ukrainians for spreading disinformation on topics related to the war. As of 2025, the primary source of information by Ukrainians is Telegram, which itself is filled with disinformation. Nongovernmental channels can only be viewed by satellite or the internet.

== See also ==
- Television in the Soviet Union

== Bibliography ==
- Wilson, A. Virtual Politics - Faking Democracy in the Post-Soviet World. "Yale University Press", 2005. ISBN 0-300-09545-7
