= Volodymyr Zavadiuk =

Ukrainian creative producer

Volodymyr Yuriyovych Zavadiuk
- Володимир Юрійович Завадюк
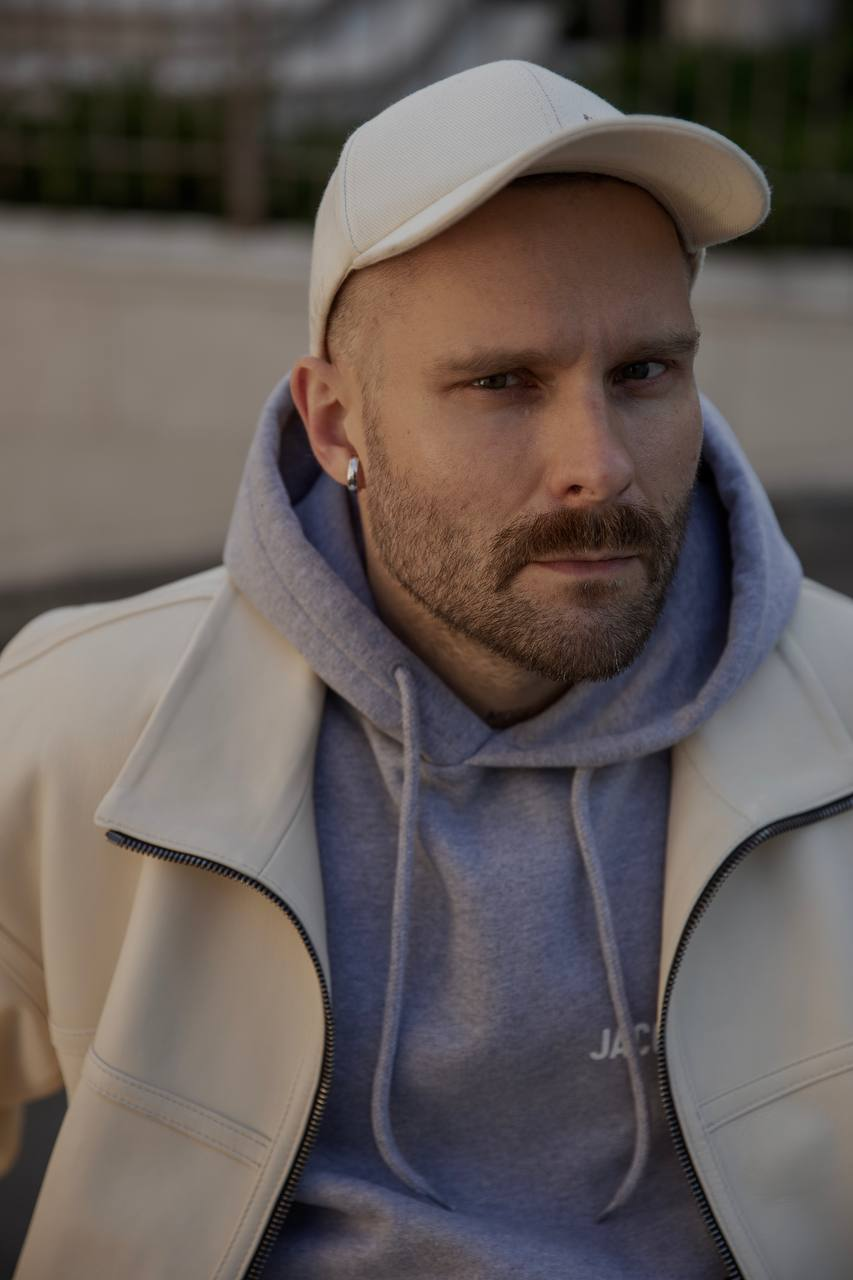
- Born: 9 June 1987 (age 38); Vinnytsia, Ukraine
- Occupations: Television producer, creative producer, media executive

Volodymyr Yuriyovych Zavadiuk (Ukrainian: Володи́мир Ю́рійович Завадю́к, romanized: Volodymyr Yuriyovych Zavadiuk; born June 9, 1987) is a Ukrainian television producer and media executive and the head of Big Brave Events and the Big Entertainment Shows department at 1+1 Media.. Zavadiuk is best known for his work on several famous Ukrainian television programs, including The Voice of Ukraine, The Voice Kids (Ukrainian TV series), Dancing with the Stars, Lip Sync Battle (Ukrainian version). He has produced major national concert broadcasts, charity events, and international collaborations, including segments for Eurovision Song Contest 2023 and the Save Ukraine telethons.

In addition to his work as a producer, he is active in educational initiatives and known for his advocacy for LGBTQ+ rights in Ukraine.

== Early life ==
Volodymyr Zavadiuk was born on June 9, 1987, in Vinnytsia, Ukraine. He studied at secondary school No. 2 and attended the Vinnytsia Children's Art School. He studied journalism at the Taras Shevchenko National University of Kyiv, after initially enrolling in medical school

== Career ==
=== Early career ===
Zavadiuk began his journalism career through the "Young Journalist" program, contributing to the 33-channel newspaper. He began his professional career in Vinnytsia, working in the local office of Channel 5, and later at the Premier and Vinnychchyna TV and radio companies. In 2008, Zavadiuk joined STB as a correspondent for Vikna-Novyny, which earned multiple Teletriumf awards.

=== TV projects (2010 - 2020s) ===
From 2010 to 2012, Zavadiuk worked on Ukraine's Got Talent and X Factor. In 2013, he joined 1+1 media, co-writing and producing The Voice of the Country and founding the Big Entertainment Shows department. During the 2022 Russian invasion, he transformed the department into Big Brave Events, focusing on international collaborations and content to support Ukraine. He led the Ukrainian version of shows like The Voice, Dancing with the Stars, and Lip Sync Battle, which became highly-rated in Ukraine. Zavadiuk was the creative producer for over 10 seasons of The Voice of the Country. In 2020, the superfinal was held online using virtual reality, and in 2022, the show was broadcast live from a metro station in Kyiv.

Zavadiuk served as the creative producer for Voice. Kids, overseeing four seasons of the show, which won two Teletriumph awards. He was also the producer of Little Giants, a talent competition for children aged 4 to 12, and Masquerade, an adaptation of the Romanian format Mysteries in the Spotlight, featuring stars in costumes showcasing various talents.

=== Recent work (2024 - present) ===
In 2024, Zavadiuk's team, Big Brave Events 1+1 media, produced a project Song of My Life (original: Пісня мого життя) the Ukrainian adaptation of Finnish television program Song of My Life in partnership with production company Film.ua. The show featured Ukrainian public figures and was based on a released in 2022 special episode of the original Finnish program. They also worked with TET TV channel on Ukraine of Incredible People, a talent show focusing on resilience during the war and addressing themes of inclusivity and LGBTQ+ support.

In fall 2024, Zavadiuk served as the showrunner for the Ukrainian version of The 1% Club on 1+1 Ukraine, a game show with progressively difficult tasks.

== Concerts and live events ==
Zavadiuk has produced concerts for artists including MONATIK, Dan Balan, Tina Karol, Okean Elzy, Olya Polyakova, and Jamala, with some events broadcast live. Other concerts and live events he has produced include:

- Ark "Ukraine": In collaboration with the Ukrainian Ministry of Culture and the 1+1 TV channel, Zavadiuk produced Ark "Ukraine", a concert combining folklore, classical music, national heritage, and modern technology.
- The opening number for the Eurovision 2023 grand final was produced by Zavadiuk's team, featuring a performance by Princess Catherine of Wales, with animations by Maria Primachenko and works by Banksy, filmed at Maidan Nezalezhnosti and Kyiv's metro.
- Zavadiuk was the creative producer for the 2024 Eurovision National Selection show, which had over 6 million views and 1.1 million participants. The project received the "Most Resonant National Event" award at the MUZVAR AWARDS 2024.
- Concerts for the rock band Okean Elzy's 30th anniversary, raising funds for the Armed Forces of Ukraine. The project won the YUNA Award for "Best Concert Show" in 2025.
- In 2025, Zavadiuk joined the Atlas Festival team as a creative producer. He contributed to the arts and music festival's updated branding and promotional campaign and participated in developing the event's concept and visual design.
- In February 2025, he produced the FROLOV fashion show at Ukrainian Fashion Week, streamed online.

== Filmography ==
Musical films

- 2014 - «The power of love and the voice. Tina Karol» - the main screenwriter.
- 2016 - «A Christmas Story with Tina Karol» - creative producer.
- 2018 - «The Intonations of Tina Karol» - creative producer.

== Charity and international projects ==
In 2022, following the full-scale Russian invasion of Ukraine, Volodymyr Zavadiuk produced several charity initiatives aimed at providing financial, moral, and political support for Ukraine. These included the international telethons Save Ukraine #StopWar, the Global Tour for Peace (charity football matches with FC Dynamo), a concert by Okean Elzy in the Zoloti Vorota metro station, the Embrace Ukraine #StrivingTogether charity marathon in Amsterdam, a Ukraine-focused episode of Song of My Life, and the national charity musical marathon You Are Not Alone. In 2024, Zavadiuk oversaw the production of a social music film Christmas. You are not alone with a focus on raising awareness of children without parental care, created in collaboration with TSUM Kyiv.

== Educational activities ==
Volodymyr Zavadiuk is involved in various educational platforms, including "1+1 media school", where he leads the course "Producer of Big Brave Events," which addresses wartime challenges. He is a speaker at conferences and events such as the "Workshop Night of New Ideas" and "Kuraž. Kyiv," covering topics like emotional impact and cultural genocide. Zavadiuk curates lectures at Taras Shevchenko National University of Kyiv and Kyiv National University of Culture and Arts. He also conducts masterclasses and has spoken at the "C21 Content Budapest" international conference.

== Personal life ==
Volodymyr Zavadiuk is a member of the LGBTQ+ community and openly gay. He is in a relationship with Pavlo Supruniuk. He is an advocate for LGBTQ+ rights in Ukraine and has publicly supported the legal recognition of civil partnerships. In 2024, he participated in the Equality March in Kyiv.

== Awards ==
- 2014 – Best Documentary at Action On Film International Film Festival – The Power of Love and the Voice. Tina Karol.
- 2015 – Teletriumph award in the category "Best Format Talent Show" – The Voice. Kids.
- 2015 – Teletriumph award in the category "Producer/Production team of a TV program" – The Voice. Kids.
- 2016 – Teletriumph award in the category "Producer/Producer Group of a TV program" – Voice of the Country, 1+1.
- 2016 – Teletriumph award in the category "Other format entertainment programs" – Voice of the Country.
- 2017 – Teletriumph award in the category "Producer/Producer Group of a TV program" – Voice of the Country, 1+1.
- 2017 – Teletriumph award in the "Format talent show" category – "Voice of the Country".
- 2018 – Teletriumph award in the category "Producer/Producer Group of a TV program" – Dancing with the Stars, 1+1.
- 2018 – Teletriumph award in the Entertainment Format Show category – Dancing with the Stars.
- 2018 – Teletriumph award in the category "Music program/concert/ceremony" – television version of Live Show MONATIK "Vitamin D"", 1+1.
- 2019 – Winner in the nomination "Producer of the Year" magazine "Viva".
- 2022 – Winner in category "Digital" of the 2nd International Television Festival "Heart of Europe" – telethon "Save Ukraine - #StopWar".
- 2024 — Winner in the category "Most Resonant Nationwide Event" at the MUZVAR AWARDS 2024 – the final of the national selection for Eurovision 2024.
- 2024 — Nomination for the Rose d'Or Awards in the "Competition Reality" category – the European season of The Voice of Ukraine.
- 2025 — Winner in the category "Best Concert Show" at the YUNA Music Awards 2025 – the concert series "That Day" by Okean Elzy.
