= United News (telethon) =

Ukrainian telethon

- Ukrainian: Єдині новини
- Genre: Newscast; Live television
- Country of origin: Ukraine
- Original language: Ukrainian

Production
- Running time: 6 hours
- Production companies: Ministry of Culture and Information Policy; 1+1 Media Group; Starlight Media; Inter Media Group; Rada TV (until January 1, 2026); Suspilne (until May 21, 2024); Media Group Ukraine (until July 22, 2022); My – Ukrayina (since November 8, 2022)

Original release
- Network: 1+1; ICTV; Pershyi (until May 21, 2024); Inter; Rada TV (until September 15, 2025); STB (until April 18, 2022); Ukrayina (until July 22, 2022); My-Ukrayina (until February 16, 2024)
- Release: February 24, 2022 – present

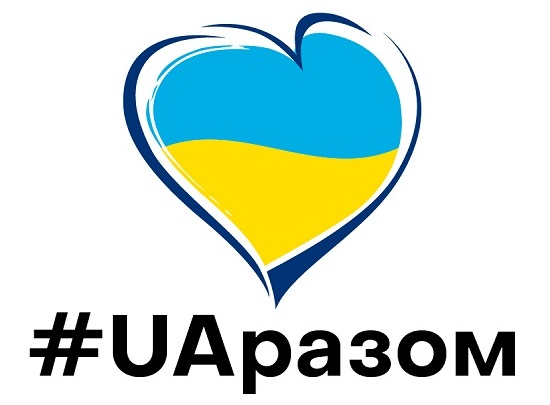
Hashtag: #UAразом

United News (Ukrainian: Телемарафон «Єдині новини», romanized: Telemarafon «Yedyni novyny»), Telemarathon or UA together (Ukrainian: UA разом, romanized: UA razom) is a joint information telethon which was launched on February 24, 2022, at the start of Russia's 2022 invasion of Ukraine. It began broadcasting at the start of the invasion on February 24, 2022, as #UAtogether (Ukrainian: #UAразом, romanized: #UArazom) and broadcast on Rada TV, the official television channel of the Verkhovna Rada.

Since February 26, 2022, television channels owned by four Ukrainian media groups, namely 1+1 Media Group, Starlight Media, Inter Media Group, Media Group Ukraine (until its closure on July 22, 2022) and My-Ukraina (since November 8, 2022), as well as public television channel Pershyi (until May 21, 2024) and Rada TV (until September 15, 2025) continued to broadcast around the clock to provide information to the public regarding the war. Each channel forms its own slot lasting 6 hours.

By the end of 2022, viewership had dropped to 14% of the television audience, and at the end of 2023 to 10%. Over 60% of Ukrainian journalists have considered the marathon a form of censorship.

== History ==
Former title card before the closure of TRC Ukraine on July 22, 2022

Former title card before the addition of My – Ukraina on November 8, 2022

At the initiative of the Minister of Culture and Information Policy of Ukraine Oleksandr Tkachenko on February 16, 2022, a telethon was held on all TV channels of Ukraine on the topic of unity from 8:00 to 10:00 and from 19:00 to 22:00. A single information platform for strategic communication UA together was created at the request of the Cabinet of Ministers of Ukraine to ensure daily informing the public about the security situation and the activities of state bodies.

Since the beginning of Russia's attack on Ukraine on February 24, at 6:30 am, all platforms of Suspilne, Ukraine's national public broadcaster, worked in the mode of an information marathon and all of the broadcaster's television channels (UA:First, UA:Kultura and all of its regional channels) was regulated by the government and their feed was temporarily transferred to that of Rada TV. Since the imposition of martial law in Ukraine on the same day, TV channels 1+1, UA:First, Rada TV, ICTV, STB and Ukrayina 24 have been broadcasting alternately, despite the hostilities, while in the studio or in bomb shelters.

On February 25, the StarLightMedia-owned Novyi Kanal, which was listed as one of the initial participants of the telethon, instead dedicated all of its airtime to airing children's movies and cartoons. They were followed by the 1+1 Media Group-owned TET, and the Media Group Ukraine-owned NLO TV. On the same day, Suspilne resumed live broadcasts, although these broadcasts were only available through Facebook and YouTube. All digital television channels in Ukraine carried UA:First's signal until February 26.

On February 26 at 9:20 a.m., Suspilne resumed broadcasting on television with its own marathon titled "Together we will win" («Разом переможемо»). Since February 28, Pershyi hosted its own telethon. Ukrainian Radio also runs a marathon using clippings from a telethon.

Free Media Holding-owned channels 5 Kanal and Priamyi kanal, as well as the internet television station Espreso TV broadcast their own alternative telethons.

On April 3, several networks, including 2+2, Enter-Film, Indigo TV, K1, Mega, NTN, and OCE, left the telethon and resumed their regular programming. They were followed by STB, which left the telethon on April 18. The channel's news team, however, continued to work in the telethon.

On July 22, television networks owned by Media Group Ukraine, including Ukrayina and Ukrayina 24, left the telethon after Rinat Akhmetov, the beneficial owner of Media Group Ukraine, returned the licenses of all media assets of the company to the state, causing all the networks owned by the company to stop broadcasting and for the company to halt its production of its assigned 6-hour slot in the telethon.

On January 3, 2024, The New York Times reported that Ukrainians had grown weary of the program, and that viewership and trust in it had plummeted. Oksana Romaniuk, head of the Kyiv-based Institute of Mass Information stated it was viewed as state propaganda and that "Everyone is fed up with this picture that says, 'We're winning, everyone likes us and gives us money'". Some television channels run by Zelenskyy's political opponents are barred from participating in the program. By the end of 2022, viewership had dropped to 14% of the television audience, and at the end of 2023 to 10%.

== Production ==
The participating Ukrainian media groups (Suspilne, 1+1 Media, Starlight Media, Inter Media Group, Rada TV, My – Ukrayina and formerly, Media Group Ukraine) take turns in helming United News, with the news divisions of each media group working five hours a day and their order of handling the program scheduled four to five days in advance.

In addition to representatives from the Ministry of Culture and Information Policy, the Armed Forces of Ukraine, the National Security and Defense Council of Ukraine and the Office of the President of Ukraine, which co-operated in establishing the program, specialists from the participating media groups (which include journalists, cameramen, technicians, editors, information producers, etc.) co-operated with the production of the program. 1+1 Media Group's team is composed of people who work for their TSN news service program, 1+1's morning show Breakfast with 1+1 and five other information and entertainment projects from 1+1 and sister channel 2+2. Starlight Media's team is composed of workers from Fakty and Vikna-Novyny, the respective news programs of ICTV and STB. However, Media Group Ukraine, whose team is made up of workers from its Ukrayina and Ukrayina 24 TV channels, broadcasts from its backup studios instead of the program's main studio complex in Kyiv due to the constant threat to their employees as air and missile strikes took place near the company's TV center.

1+1 and Rada TV alternately provide 24/7 signal redundancy, so that the program's studio can work even when an air raid siren is sounded nearby.

Rada TV also provided alternate feeds of the program in English and Russian through their YouTube channel. The program's live English and Russian interpretation is done by volunteers.

== Broadcasters ==
=== In Ukraine ===
As of March 28, 2022, about 30 Ukrainian TV channels (including 16 from the participating media groups), over-the-top (OTT) platforms, public and commercial radio stations were broadcasting United News, which provides maximum coverage in the country. Some of the OTT platforms that carry the program include 1+1 video, Kyivstar TV, Vodafone TV, MEGOGO, Omega TV, Sweet.tv and YouTV.

Participating broadcasters in Ukraine
Owner	Current participating channel(s)	Former participating channel(s)	Presenters
Suspilne		Pershyi, Suspilne Regional, Suspilne Novyny and Suspilne Kultura	Andriy Dikhtyarenko, Denys Zepsen, Yevhen Agarkov, Olesya Nitsevich, Vyacheslav Afutin, Anatoly Yerema, Anna Cherednychenko, Dmytro Khorkin (until April 15), Inna Moskvina
1+1 Media Group	Full time: 1+1 Marathon and 2+2 Marathon; In night time: 1+1 International and UNIAN. Serial	TET, Paramount Comedy/Comedy Central, Bigudi, Kvartal TV, 1+1 Ukraine, 2+2	Solomiya Vitvitska, Marichka Padalko, Ruslan Sharipov, Svyatoslav Grynchuk, Nataliya Moseychuk, Maksym Sukhenko, Yevgen Plinskyi, Natalya Ostrovska, Alla Mazur, Stas Yasynskyi, Kateryna Nesterenko, Yevgen Kuksin
Inter Media Group	Inter, Enter-Film (in night time)	K1, Mega, NTN, Inter+, K2, Zoom	Anastasia Daugule, Oleksandr Vasylchenko, Iryna Baglai, Liliya Nalyagaka, Oleksiy Fadeev, Oleksandr Prosyanyk
Starlight Media	ICTV	OCE, STB, Novyi Kanal, ICTV Ukraine (now ICTV2)	Petro Demyanchuk, Orest Drymalovskyi, Yana Brenzei, Oksana Sokolova, Andrii Kovalskyi, Vadym Karpyak, Olena Frolyak, Anastasia Mazur, Serhii Kudimov, Yuliya Senyk, Vyacheslav Tsimbalyuk
Parliament of Ukraine	Rada TV (Partially since September 16, 2025, full retranslation since January 1, 2026)		Hanna Homonai, Olena Morozova, Vadim Gerasimovich, Tetyana Goncharova, Vadim Kolodiychuk, Artem Bibik, Kateryna Pavlova, Nazar Dovgiy, Andriy Sinitsyn, Oleksandr Desyatnikov, Svitlana Usenko, Olga Butko, Maksym Zborovskyi
Ihor Petrenko (de jure) Andriy Yermak (de facto)	My – Ukrayina, My – Ukrayina+ (in night time)		Oleg Panyuta, Lyudmila Dobrovolska, Olena Tsintila Mykyta Mikhalov, Marina Kuhar, Ihor Pupkov, Olena Chabak, Maxim Sikora, Olga Hrytsyk, Maria Skyba, Vera Sverdlyk, Viktoriya Malosvitna, Kostyantyn Linchevskyi, Bohdan Mashai, Yulia Galushka
Media Group Ukraine		Ukrayina, Ukrayina 24, Indigo TV, NLO TV, Football 1, Football 2, Football 3	Victoria Malosvitna, Maxim Sikora, Marina Kuhar, Olga Hrytsyk, Yuriy Bibyk, Nikita Mikhalov, Elena Tsintila, Maria Skyba, Oleg Panyuta, Vera Sverdlyk, Tigran Martirosyan, Kostyantyn Linchevskyi, Andriy Bulgarov, Lyudmila Dobrovolska, Vasyl Pekhno, Vitaly Prudius
Other broadcasters	Partial retranslation: Apostrophe (night time), Kapuchino TV, 8 Channel, ATR, local and regional channels	4 Kanal, Live, Typical Kyiv, Odesa Live, ECO TV, XSPORT+, First Business Channel, New Christian, UNC, Televsesvit, 5 kanal, 24 Kanal, Pryamiy kanal, Espreso, Kyiv TV, XSPORT, Obozrevatel TV	

=== Outside Ukraine ===
In addition to broadcasting domestic and international versions of the participating media groups' flagship channels (currently 1+1 Marathon (all time) and 1+1 International (20:00-21:00 and night time)) on OTT-services (previously open signal satellite), Ukrainian TV channels have granted the right for international broadcast providers to retransmit their signal outside Ukraine on their various platforms, including on Delfi TV (3:00-6:00, brand 1+1 Marathon) in Lithuania and terrestrial television (Rada TV, DVB-T) in Latvia. In the first days of the marathon, more than 40 providers in Canada, the Czech Republic, Estonia, Latvia, Lithuania, Poland, the United Kingdom, and other countries have started airing United News.

== Criticism ==
Since February 2022, Ukrainians have gained access to a single source of television news in the form of the United News telethon that was initially "widely seen as an element of defense against Russia’s attempt to subjugate Ukraine." However, after almost two years of war, interest in the United News decreased, and Ukrainians began to show fatigue from the program, which was previously considered an integral element of national unity. Critics of United News have accused the program of distorting the reality of the war by keeping silent about events at the front and weakening Western support for Ukraine. As a result, the telethon became an object of ridicule, viewed more as a mouthpiece of the government than as an objective source of information. The telethon, which was previously considered an important tool for maintaining national unity, as the war continued, became a "massive PR operation" in favor of President Volodymyr Zelenskyy, his political allies and his ruling Servant of the People party, attacking opposition forces in the country, including Petro Poroshenko's European Solidarity party. Despite its still high trust ratings, they have declined markedly in the last months of 2023, reflecting a general decrease in support due to the evolution of the program's content and its perception as a means of political manipulation.

Experts believe that the sharp decline in viewership and confidence in the program is a sign of a broader public disappointment in the government's actions, especially in conditions when victory on the battlefield seems unattainable. Instead, many Ukrainians preferred to spend time watching popular reality shows and entertainment programs, deviating from the theme of military events.

Serious concerns about the government's influence arose when several channels controlled by Zelenskyy's political opponents were banned from joining the United News telethon. This ban caused viewers to worry about the objectivity of the program, highlighting the possible impact of political interests on its content. As the Russian invasion dragged on, viewers began to perceive the patriotic subtext of the program as increasingly exaggerated. Coverage of Ukraine's counteroffensive in 2023 also caused discontent, as it seemed too optimistic, despite the setbacks and failures that accompanied this period. Media expert Ihor Kulias, analyzing telethon for the Ukrainian organization detector.media, noted that the participants of the show for most of 2023 focused on "the effectiveness and skill of the Ukrainian forces", while the Russian forces were described in an extremely negative light, which created a "completely different reality" compared to the actual situation on the ground.

In October 2024, the European Commission criticised the program citing concerns over its objectivity and financing by the Ukrainian state. It called for Ukraine to restore the work of all broadcasters in the pre-war format. In response, the Ukrainian government said that it would not stop supporting the telethon before the end of martial law.
