= Bigudi (TV channel) =

- Country: Ukraine
- Broadcast area: Nationwide
- Headquarters: Kyiv, Ukraine

Programming
- Language: Ukrainian
- Picture format: 16:9 (576i, HDTV)

Ownership
- Owner: 1+1 Media Group (Vision 4 LLC)

Availability

Terrestrial
- Zeonbud: LCN 9 (MX-1)

Bigudo (Ukrainian: Бігуді) is a Ukrainian television channel owned by 1+1 Media, catering a female 18-54 demographic. The channel broadcasts Ukrainian, Turkish and Indian series, as well as original productions.

== History ==
The channel was announced on 18 December 2023, when 1+1 Media announced the acquisition of Real TV Estate's license. The rationale behind its creation was the fact that the market, especially the group, had male-centric TV channels (2+2), but no female channel. Bigudi thus started broadcasting on 13 January 2014..

On 4 March 2017, the channel converted to 16:9 widescreen.. That year, it saw a 29% increase in the target demographic and won 0,46% share..

With the beginning of the Russian invasion of Ukraine on 24 February 2022, it suspended its programming and started carrying the United News marathon. On 30 March 2022, regular broadcasts resumed.

On 23 March 2023, the National Radio and Television Council granded a license to operate Bigudi on the MX-1 digital terrestrial multiplex; broadcasts began on 21 April..

On 23 November, it won the license to broadcast on the MX-1 multiplex under licensee Vision 4 LLC.

On 25 January 2024, the regulator decided to change Real Estate TV LLC, Bigudi's licensee, to 2+2 Marafon. Bigudi thus moved to Vision 4 LLC.

On 16 July 2025, the Ukrainain Ministry of Culture designated it as a critical importance channel, in order for its staff not to be mobilized.
