= Ukrainian Hydrometeorological Center =

National hydro-meteorological service of Ukraine

- Український гідрометеорологічний центр Ukrainskyi hidrometeorolohichnyi tsentr

Agency overview
- Formed: 2011
- Preceding agencies: Ukrainian State Hydrometeorological Service (УкрДГС); Central Geophysical Observatory (ЦГО); Ukrainian Hydrometeorological Institute (УкрГМІ); Ukrmet (Укрмет)
- Type: Meteorological service
- Headquarters: Kyiv; 50°26′58.6″N 30°30′46.7″E
- Agency executives: Veronika Filonenko, Director; Yuri Burlaka, Deputy Director
- Website: www.meteo.gov.ua

The Ukrainian Hydrometeorological Center (Ukrainian: Український гідрометеорологічний центр, УкрГМЦ) is the national hydrometeorological service of Ukraine.

== History ==
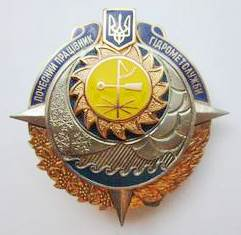
Award «Honorable worker of the Hydrometservice» (1999-2012)

Early scientific weather observation and forecasting in Ukraine was carried out by various observatories located in the territory of Ukraine between the 17th and 19th centuries. In 1844, Kyiv University designed a plan to establish its own meteorological observatory, which was eventually built in 1855. In 1921, the Ukrmet (Укрмет) was founded as a centralized hydrometeorological service for providing weather forecasts and weather warning services, with local departments in each region of Ukraine.

In 1948, Ukrmet joined the International Meteorological Organization, and then become a member of it successor — the World Meteorological Organization, established in 1950. In 1953, the Ukrainian Hydrometeorological Institute (Український гідрометеорологічний інститут, УкрГМІ) was established as a scientific and educational institution for climate research and meteorology, independent from Ukrmet. In 1964, the Kyiv meteorological observatory moved to a new building, and in 1996 it transformed into the independent Central Geophysical Observatory (ЦГО), operating its own network of weather stations. On 19 November 2003, the Day of Meteorology worker (also known as Meteorologist Day) was introduced in Ukraine as an annual professional holiday, as opposed to the World Meteorological Day celebrated on 23 March. In 2010, the Ukrainian State Hydrometeorological Service (УкрДГС) launched its official website. In preparation for UEFA Euro 2012, a «Weather EURO2012» page was launched on official website.

In 2011, the Ukrainian State Hydrometeorological Service was transformed into the Ukrainian Hydrometeorological Center and released its strategy up to 2020. That same year, the Ministry of Emergencies of Ukraine (МНС) was transformed into the State Emergency Service of Ukraine (ДСНС), which since then curates the UHMI, UHMC and CGO independently from each other (UHMI co-curated by the National Academy of Sciences of Ukraine).

Ukrainian hydrometeorological center: "We observe. We predict. We warn."
State Emergency Service of Ukraine: "Prevent. Save. Help."

Since 2014, due the Russo-Ukrainian war, many of UHMC's local weather stations have been occupied, damaged or totally ruined.

In 2021, UHMC celebrated its 100th anniversary. The same year UHMC released its strategy up to 2030.

Due to the Russian invasion of Ukraine since 2022, many local weather stations in Kherson, Mykolaiv, Kharkiv Zaporizhzhia and other regions were lost or damanged. The war also impacted the nature and weather conditions in Ukraine, such as the destruction of the Kakhovka Dam, the destruction of many populated places, power plants and factories, massive wildfires and deforestation. All together this may influence global climate changes, unpredicted by earlier designed weather models.

As of 2023, UHMC operated a network of around 250 weather stations, one half being classic stationary stations.

Logo

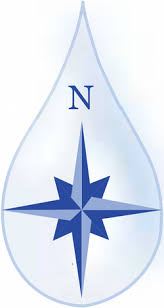
2010

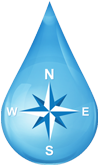
2012

2024

=== Administration ===
- 1992—2011: Mykola Kulbida (executive director)
- 2011—2024: Mykola Kulbida (director-in-chief)
- 2024—present: Veronika Filonenko (acting director)

=== Membership ===
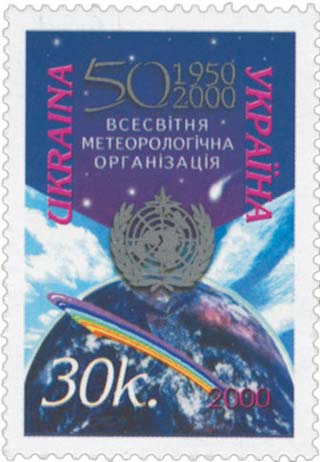
«WMO. 50 Years» stamp by Ukrposhta

UHMC represents Ukraine and is a member of various international organizations and projects:

- World Meteorological Organization
- EUMETSAT inviates UHMC for trainings
- Meteoalarm
- Danube monitoring (DanubeHIS, DAREFORT, LAREDAR)
- Dniester monitoring

Since 2022, collaboration established with the Finnish Meteorological Institute on modernizing hydrometeorology infrastructure and operations in Ukraine.

== Services ==
UHMC, together with UHMI, is an exclusive weather service and data provider for all subdivisions of the Ministry of Internal Affairs of Ukraine, Energoatom, Ukrhydroenergo, and the Hydrometeorological service of the Armed Forces of Ukraine (military meteorologists of the Hydrometeorological Center of the AFU (ГМЦ ЗСУ) operates own small network of weather stations). For the aeronautical weather UHMC cooperates with the State Enterprise «Ukrainian Aviation Meterorological Center» (ДП «УАМЦ»), independently curated by SESU.

Insignia

UHMC SESU

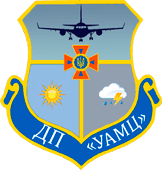
SE «UAMC»

HMC AFU

For the general public, UHMC provides plenty of weather services for free via official website and its pages on social media:

- Warnings (State Emergency Service of Ukraine responsible for notifing public via FM/AM-radio, TV and civil defense sirens)
- Current weather and forecast values, chart and maps (as base uses Visicom Maps, based on OpenStreetMap Data)
- Weather Widget (for site owners)
- Cloud coverage animation (based on EUMETSAT/Meteosat imagery and data processed by UHMI)
- Radiology situation and forecast
- Hidrology situation and forecast
- Agrometeorology situation and forecast
- Aeronautics situation and forecast
  - Weather radar (operated by SE «UAMC» and relaunched in 2019, it was destroyed in 2022 during Russian invasion)
- Air pollution and quality situation

While UHMC is a non-profit organization, it provides some paid services on request, such as raw data access and custom forecasts.

For decades UHMC had a monopoly on weather data collecting, processing and providing for the public in Ukraine. With the rise of cheap automatic weather stations and widespread mobile Internet access, many amateurs and private companies, such as urban developers and agricultural holdings, constructed grids of personal weather stations in Ukraine and launched own weather services (SaveEcoBot, LUN, OpenWeatherMap, Weather Underground, Blitzortung, etc.).

== See also ==
- National Antarctic Scientific Center of Ukraine
- Sich-1 and Sich-1M
- Alerts.in.ua

== Publications ==
- Стратегія розвитку гідрометеорологічної діяльності в Україні на період до 2020 року (in Ukrainian) = Strategy of hydrometeorology operations development in Ukraine for the period up to 2020. Kyiv: UHMC, 2012. (Archived from the original)
- Skrynyk, Oleg; Luterbacher, Jürg; Allan, Rob; Boichuk, Dmytro; Sidenko, Vladyslav; Skrynyk, Olesya; Palarz, Angelika; Oshurok, Dmytro; Xoplaki, Elena; Osadchyi, Volodymyr (2021). "Ukrainian early (pre-1850) historical weather observations". Geoscience Data Journal. 8 (1): 55–73. doi:10.1002/gdj3.108. ISSN 2049-6060.
- Osadchyi, V.I.; Khilchevskyi, V.K.; Manukalo, V.O. (2021). "NATIONAL HYDROMETEOROLOGICAL SERVICE IN UKRAINE - CENTURY OF SYSTEM OBSERVATIONS AND FORECASTS (1921-2021)". Ukrainian Geographical Journal (3): 03–11. doi:10.15407/ugz2021.03.003. ISSN 1561-4980.
- Kulbida, M. I.; Manukalo, V. O.; Kutzyi, A. V. (2022-11-15). "How the Russian Federation is Destroying the Hydrometeorological Service of Ukraine". 16th International Conference Monitoring of Geological Processes and Ecological Condition of the Environment. 2022. European Association of Geoscientists & Engineers: 1–5. doi:10.3997/2214-4609.2022580097.

=== Journals ===
- Meteorology. Hydrology. Environmental monitoring (by UHMI)
- Ukrainian Hydrometeorological Journal (by Odessa State Environmental University, co-edited by UHMC)

=== Books ===
- ПАМ’ЯТКА керівникам та працівникам гідрометеорологічних організацій щодо дій в умовах воєнного стану (in Ukrainian) = MEMO BOOK for admins and workers of hydrometeorological organizations on operating under martial law. УкрГМЦ, 2022.
- Гайд з МЕТЕОграмотності (in Ukrainian) = Guide for METEOawareness. УкрГМЦ, 2024.
- Все, що треба знати про погоду (in Ukrainian) = All You Need to Know About weather. УкрГМЦ, 2024.

== Links ==
- Official website (in Ukrainian)
- UHMC's Educational projects (in Ukrainian)
- Channel on YouTube
