= Ukraine News Today =

Television channel

Ukraine Today
- Country: Ukraine
- Broadcast area: Europe, United States
- Headquarters: Kyiv, Ukraine

Programming
- Language: English

Ownership
- Owner: 1+1 Media
- Sister channels: 1+1 International; 1+1

History
- Launched: 24 August 2014
- Closed: 1 April 2016 (television broadcasting); 1 January 2017
- Replaced by: UATV

Links
- Website: uatoday.tv

Availability

Streaming media
- Live stream: YouTube stream
- Official Website

Ukraine News Today was a Ukraine-based private English language satellite television channel and webcasting service. The channel, which was owned by the Ukrainian 1+1 group and headquartered in Kyiv, presented round-the-clock news bulletins aimed at the overseas news market. The General Producer was Tetiana Pushnova.

In April 2016 it stopped satellite broadcasting, to become an online-only service. Prior to that, it was an international satellite television channel. On 26 December 2016, it was announced that its parent company 1+1 was shutting down the online service on 1 January 2017.

== History ==
In the midst of the Revolution of Dignity and Euromaidan, which saw major political change in Ukraine, as well as a surge of perceived anti-Ukraine propaganda from Russia, and in particular from channel RT, Ukrainian oligarch Ihor Kolomoyskiy, owner of one of the largest media groups in Ukraine, 1+1 Group, switched the focus of his first 24-hour news channel from Jewish matters to Ukraine, before relaunching as Ukraine Today. Kolomoyskyi stated that "Ukraine Today is our contribution in support of Ukraine's European choice".

=== Previous ventures ===
The channel has its origins in two previous English-language news channels owned by 1+1 Media and its majority shareholder Ukrainian oligarch Ihor Kolomoyskyi; Jewish News 1, which closed on 22 April 2014, and the intermediary channel Ukraine News 1 which closed in June 2014. Ten journalists of Jewish News 1 then moved over the new channel.

=== Launch of Ukraine Today ===
Ukraine Today began broadcasting on 14 August 2014, with a live stream on YouTube and via the Eutelsat Hot Bird satellite, displaying a testcard and scrolling text giving information on how to receive the channel. The channel officially launched on Ukrainian Independence Day, 24 August when it began broadcasting news content.

In 2014 Ukraine Today was operated by the UNIAN TV company. In September 2014 Ukraine Today moved programming to a fully functioning studio, with presenters and interviews, following the original plans.

In October 2015 Ukraine Today launched in English on the Virgin Media platform, alongside its sister channel 1+1 International, being the first Ukrainian TV channels to broadcast to the United Kingdom. The Ukrainian embassy in London then joined the channel in 'officially launching' in the UK that December. It was already available in Italy, Germany, Netherlands, Belgium, Spain, and in Washington D.C. on the MHz Networks cable system.

=== Closure ===
Less than a year later, in April 2016, it was announced that satellite broadcasting of Ukraine Today would be stopped as a cost saving measure. It would move to being an online-only service. On 26 December 2016, it was announced that the online-only service would be shut down on 1 January 2017. In its final press release Ukraine Today stated its "main purpose was to counter information war waged on Ukraine by Russian propaganda media outlets" and that it had "fulfilled its mission". Most of the staff, including Ukraine Today's Tom Bell, moved to the Ukrainian broadcaster UA TV.

== Format ==
According to the channel, its primary focus is on Ukrainian current affairs, with additional editorial focuses including EU expansion and integration, Russian relations with Europe and America, the defence of European values in both Ukraine and within the EU itself, and the challenges of nation-building in the 21st century.

Ukraine Today started broadcasting Euronews style content on 14 August 2014.

== See also ==
- Mass media of Ukraine
- International broadcasting
