= OWM =

OWM may refer to:

- Office of War Mobilization
- OpenWeatherMap
