= TSN.ua =

Ukrainian news website

TCH.ua

- The home page for TCH.ua, as of 28 September 2022.
- Website type: News website
- Available in: Ukrainian, Russian, English (Note: In English only as a column about the war.)
- Area served: Ukraine; Worldwide
- Owners: 1+1 Internet, LLC (1+1 Media Group)
- Industry: Online news
- Website: List: tsn.ua (in Ukrainian) tsn.ua/ru (in Russian) tsn.ua/en (in English) (Note: The English-language edition of the also controlled 1+1 news agency UNIAN, which appeared in response to the biggest problem of that period – the hybrid war unleashed by Russia against Ukraine, the closure of which was announced on 14 June 2021, resumed broadcasting for a while on the English-language Facebook page after the full-scale invasion in 2022 year, and then stopped, therefore the English-language section of TSN is the only English-language broadcast 1+1 Media.)
- Advertising: Banner ads and promoted links
- Commercial: Yes
- Registration: None
- Launched: 21 August 2008; 18 years ago
- Current status: Online
- Native client on: 11 million MAU (Aug 2022)

TSN.UA (stylised as TCH.ua) is a news website owned and operated by 1+1 Internet, LLC, subsidiary and division of 1+1 Media Group as the online arm of TSN. Along with original and wire reporting, it features content from 1+1 shows such as TSN Evening News, TSN Week, TSN in sign language, and The right to power, the 1+1 TV channel, and partners such as Spetskor and UNIAN.

== History ==
The site was established as news.1plus1.tv or news.1plus1.ua, later in 2008 already as tsn.ua.

On 18 June 2018, it became known that TCH.ua was the first among Ukrainian journalists websites to launch AMP Stories.

On 15 October 2018, TCH.ua was adapted for blind people.

On 16 March 2020, it was announced that TCH.ua together with the 1+1 Digital development team updated the site's mobile application for the Android operating system.

On 23 March 2022 at 2:00 p.m. on the main page of TCH.ua in connection with the Russian invasion of Ukraine, a link to the news section about the war from the editors of TSN in English, which is located on tsn.ua/en and is updated to this day, appeared.

=== 2021 redesign ===
==== Developing ====
In early 2016, TSN, together with the then contractor, relaunched the website with a new modern design. In addition to the redesign, part of the site code was refactored with additional features included. Already at the beginning, slow work, instability, inability to withstand the load was observed. The new site had problems of the work of an adaptive version on mobile devices, 1+1 Internet asked for help to Ideil.

Ideil started work on conducting a technical audit. The results were disappointing. The quality of the code did not conform to any canons and practices. Spaghetti code is the main audit verdict. XSS-vulnerabilities, Blind SQL-injections, full of slow and complicated mysql slow log queries, slow file cache, problems with saving and processing videos and photos.

17 February 2016, marks the start of work stabilizing the website, fixing critical bugs and vulnerabilities. By dividing the monolithic architecture into microservices Ideil separated independent parts from the core, which served most media projects. Ideil have integrated Sentry for tracking all events and errors on the site.

In May 2016, it was decided to abandon the old engine, as its development and maintenance were complex and expensive. Website development and the creation of new services turned into a struggle with the existing architecture and structure. Simultaneously supporting TSN, Ideil started working on a new website version using Laravel and vue.js, which was still ß at the time.

Team consisting of 6 developers worked on the project during the first 3 months, spending about 400 hours monthly. They completely changed the database structure, the work process with stats and decided to keep the design, but change only layouts and the front-end. TSN editorial staff used CMS, which worked with an old, slow, and divided into several parts database. After designing a new database structure for the new site we had to additionally develop special software that would constantly synchronize data between two databases (old and new). It had to function this way until a new CMS was developed.

While working on the website it wasn't planned to change the CMS, which operated through the old database structure, methods, and approaches to working with content. Migrator is a microservice responsible for transforming publications from the old format to the new one. It worked almost on the fly, tracking the new publications, the content change in existing ones, and posting this content in a new structure. During the testing phase, when the editors worked with the old admin panel, the content appeared both on the old and the new site, which was still under development at the time. Migrator worked in this mode for 8 months.

1 January 2017 at 2:00 a.m. the old website was disconnected and replaced by a new one, developed using Laravel and vue.js. Work on a new CMS began after the release. This system was implemented alongside the old one so the editors could work in both at the same time. Migrator has been configured for two-way content synchronization between the old and new CMS. It provided an easy transit to the new interface for editors and a gradual withdrawal of the old functionality.

In autumn 2017 we relinquished the old code, disabled the migrator and the old CMS. The TSN website shared the news on mobile applications and Smart TV via API. The old API caused slow app operation, so Ideil refactored it completely: changed approaches and interactions. The old API was left for old applications and services legacy-support. Ideil have also updated applications for Android and Apple's tvOS, iOS and iPadOS platforms.

In the summer of 2020, 1+1 Media updated the design of the TV news service. By the end of August, we needed to "tune in" the existing website version in accordance with the updated TV program style in order to prepare readers for a full-scale redesign. Ideil team redesigned everything according to the new guide, repblished the homepage: rearranged the grid and put the image form factors into an adequate shape, added more air, left the dark integrators behind and fixed the typography. They began working on the homepage layout and designing a new TSN website simultaneously.

Ideil performed a complete site redesign and code refactoring. TSN received new formats, new content delivery, and a completely new codebase. Moreover, the programming language interpreter and frameworks, including vue.js and Laravel have been updated to the latest versions. During refactoring, Ideil aimed to reduce the loading speed of TSN pages from 2 seconds to several milliseconds. The editorial board planned to gain a foothold in the top rankings of Ukrainian online media. The next stage consisted of layout and frontend, one of the longest processes in the development of TSN. As a result, we got a whole new front. Nothing left from the previous version. And finally, programming. From the beginning of January 2021 until May of the same year, more than 500 committees were carried out. Refactoring involved at least 400 files with program code. All code is written in compliance with the PSR-12 standard.

==== Release ====
On 7 June 2021, a major redesign of TCH.ua was introduced; TCH.ua project manager Svitlana Panyushkina explained that the new design is a "further improvement of our "supermarket news" concept", by emphasizing multimedia content, original features, and more original reporting from TSN personalities. The team of news resource group 1+1 media TCH.ua updated the visual style of the site, technical characteristics and approach to working with content. The speed of the site has almost doubled, as a result of which it has become even more dynamic and more user friendly.

New sections have appeared on the main page of the site: "Trends" — the most popular news according to readers, "Spetstem" — materials on current topics that define our lives today and in the future. In addition, special attention to the resource is paid to video content: it was brought to a separate top column, which is always located on the home page.

=== Criticism ===
In 2016, the headline to the news TCH.ua about the ex-official distorted its essence. The editors of the site apologized to readers and former deputy head of the Odessa Regional State Administration Oleksandr Borovik for an incorrect headline to the news about his sexual orientation. The headline has been changed and now the correct version of the news has been published on the site. At the same time, the editorial board is convinced that sexual orientation cannot be a reason for discrediting and oppressing a person and is everyone's personal choice.

== Ranking ==
As of January 2012, TCH.ua had ranked first in Ukraine unique users among global news sites for 3 months in a row.

April 2016 rankings show TCH.ua at number 1 among most popular news websites.

According to the results of December 2017, TCH.ua demonstrated the largest reach among Ukrainian news resources. According to research data published by Kantar TNS CMeter, about 3.5 million unique visitors learned news from TCH.ua every month. More than 60% of them did it from mobile devices.

In February 2018, the audience of the TCH.ua website exceeded 4 million unique visitors. Almost 3 million visited the site from mobile phones. This is evidenced by the data of the monthly report of the market meter of the Ukrainian Internet audience Gemius.

In November 2018, the reach of TCH.ua was 5.7 million unique users, of which 4.8 million read the site from mobile devices.

In 2018, the number of views of TCH.ua increased by 50% and amounted to half a billion, compared to 2017; the reach of the resource increased by 42%, and the average monthly share in the Ukrainian Internet was 19%. According to the Gemius Audience final report, every fifth user of Internet services in Ukraine read news on TCH.ua in 2018. 70% of the audience did it from mobile devices.

In May 2019, TCH.ua broke its own historical record — the site's share exceeded 26% of the Ukrainian Internet audience, and the number of unique visitors was 6.5 million.

According to data from the research company Gemius Audience, TCH.ua took first place in the ranking of Ukrainian news sites in terms of the number of unique users and is the undisputed leader in terms of the average monthly number of unique users in 2020 as of December 2020.

According to the research company Gemius Audience, in May 2021, the site TCH.ua bypassed with a certain gap other news resources of Ukraine: 8.7 million unique users and almost 86 million pages viewed, in August — 8,3 million unique users.

As of January 2022, TCH.ua was the most popular news resource in Ukraine, in March of the same year it was visited by more than 11.4 million unique users, and by August their number decreased by only 10% to 11 million.

== Content ==
TCH.ua covers national and international news of general interest, using original and wire service reporting, as well as videos from the network's television division.

A major focus is online content for the TSN family of programming.

Video is distributed via the video on demand service 1+1 video. Additionally, the website provides exchange rates, weather forecasts through UNIAN provides Foreca, RSS feeds, podcasts, and netcasts of the network's broadcasts.
