= Alerts.in.ua =

Ukrainian online service to disseminate air raid alerts

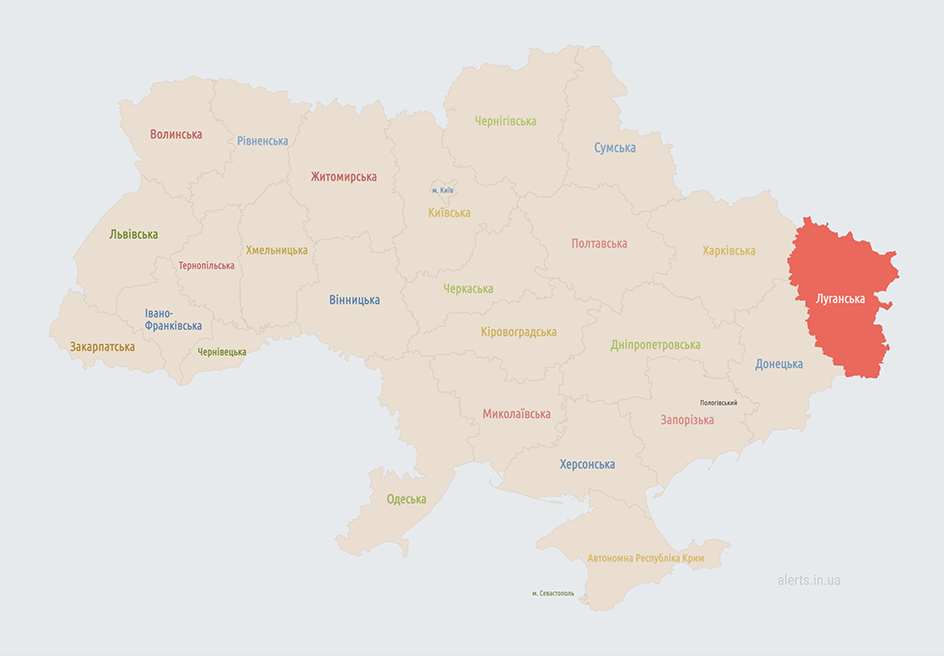
- Release: 22 March 2022
- Available in: Ukrainian, English, Japanese, Polish
- Website: https://alerts.in.ua/

alerts.in.ua is an online service that visualizes information about air alerts and other threats on the map of Ukraine.

== History ==
The idea of the site appeared in the first weeks of the 2022 Russian invasion of Ukraine, during the development of other projects related to alerting the population about alarms.

On March 2, 2022, the "Lviv Siren" bot was created, which reported on air alarms in Lviv on Twitter. Later, the idea arose to monitor alarms all over Ukraine and display them on a map. However, the lack of a single official source reporting alarms made this task much more difficult.

On March 15, 2022, the Ajax Systems company announced the creation of the official Telegram channel "Air Alarm". This channel receives signals from the "Air Alarm" application and instantly publishes messages about the start and end of alarms in different regions of Ukraine. This immediately solved the problem with the source of information and gave impetus to the further implementation of the project.

On March 22, 2022, the first version of the "Air Alarm Map" website was published, located on the war.ukrzen.in.ua domain.

The map quickly gained popularity in social networks. It, like several other similar projects, began to be widely distributed by the mass media: Suspilne, Novyi Kanal, UNIAN, DW, Fakty ICTV, Vikna TV, Ukrainian Radio, STB, Espresso, dev.ua, itc.ua and state bodies: Center for Countering Disinformation at the National Security and Defense Council of Ukraine, Verkhovna Rada of Ukraine, Khmelnytska OVA, etc.

On April 8, 2022, the site moved to the alerts.in.ua domain, where it is still available today.

On August 25, 2022, the service began monitoring local official channels in addition to the main "Air Alarm".

On September 11, 2022, the English version of the site was published.

On March 22, 2023, its own Android application was published.

The project is actively developing and has its own community.

== Description ==
The main part of the site is a map of Ukraine, on which the regions where an air alert or other threats have been declared are highlighted in real time.

As of October 16, 2022, 5 types of threats are supported:

- Air alarm.
- The threat of artillery fire.
- The threat of street fighting.
- Chemical threat.
- Nuclear threat.

Additionally, based on media reports, information is published about other dangerous events, such as explosions, demining, etc.

There is an option to view the history of announced alarms with links to sources. Alarm statistics for different time periods are also available.

For developers, there is an API that allows to develop third party services based on information about declared alarms directly from the website.

The site is available in Ukrainian, English, Polish and Japanese.

== Use ==
The map is used by:

- To monitor the situation in the country and the region.
- To illustrate the alarms announced in the mass media: TSN, Ukrainian truth, Channel 24, Suspilne, RBC Ukraine, Gromadske, Glavkom.
- As a map of alarms in mobile applications, there is Alarm and AirAlert.
- As an API for its services, including alternative alarm maps, Telegram, Viber channels, Discord bots, IoT projects, etc.

== Statistics ==
- 89.5% of users use the map from a mobile phone, 10% from a PC and 1% from a tablet.
- Top 6 countries by visit: Ukraine, United States, Poland, Germany, Great Britain and Japan.

== Alternative projects ==
eMap was created by the developer Vadym Klymenko. AlarmMap is an online from the Ukrainian office of Agroprep. The official map of air alarms was developed by Ajax Systems together with the developer Artem Lemeshev, Stfalcon with the support of the Ministry of Statistics.
