= UT-3 (TV channel) =

Ukrainian national television channel (1992–1995)

- Country: Ukraine
- Broadcast area: Ukraine
- Headquarters: Kyiv, Ukraine

Programming
- Language: Ukrainian
- Picture format: 4:3 SDTV

Ownership
- Owner: National Television of Ukraine
- Sister channels: UT-1; UT-2

History
- Launched: 26 September 1992; 33 years ago
- Closed: 14 August 1995

UT-3 (Ukrainian: УТ-3), formally known as the Third Channel of the National Television of Ukraine (Ukrainian: Третій канал національного телебачення України), was a Ukrainian public television channel, operated by NTU. Targeting the youth, it was carried on UT-2's transmitter network for five to seven hours a day (7pm to closedown, which was between 12am and 2am). It existed for nearly three years and was later folded.

== Overview ==
UT-3 timeshared with UT-2 and the Russian RTR. The channel targeted the youth and catered to a more progressive audience. It was often impossible to distinguish UT-3 from UT-2, since UT-3 barely used an on-screen logo in its programming. On air, it aired music, entertainment and information-related content.

== History ==
UT-3 started broadcasting on 26 September 1992, a Saturday. Precisely at 7pm, which was the start of the airtime reserved for RTR, an announcer appeared on screen, informing the viewers of the launch of a new Ukrainian television channel, and also apologised the viewers of the Russian channel for interrupting programming, under the principle that "progress must not be stopped". On its first night, however, UT-3 offered an "intermission" to air RTR programming.

Since UT-2 in 1992–1993 repeated the broadcast of the Verkhovna Rada plenaries, UT-3's programmes were only seen on weekends and Mondays, when the Supreme Council was in recess.

The channel's development continued in 1994. This time the schedule increased from three nights a week to five, adding programmes on Thursdays and Fridays, and, like before, timesharing with UT-2 and RTR. By catering to a younger audience than UT-2, in 1993, it entered into an agreement with TV Megapol to create programmes both would air. This led to a new version of the channel.

Broadcasts ceased on the UT-2 network on 14 August 1995. The name UT-3 was still listed in the press, but to refer to the third network NTU used to relay ORT, which later became Inter, a private channel.

== Programming ==
On its first day it aired Teenage Mutant Ninja Turtles, a report on the Republican Centre for Smart Children (produced by the channel's news team), the music programme Some Call it Jazz (Ukrainian: УТ-3Хтось називає це словом джаз, Computer Chronicles (from Worldnet), as well as two SIT-3 bulletins from the TV Tabachuk news team. SIT-3 was also the first independent television news service in Ukraine. Other studios, like Studio KM, produced programmes such as Sit Down and Watch (already seen on Megapol and TET).

Hit-rik (Hit of the Year) was the first chart show on Ukrainian television with international music videos. The best music videos were selected for the New Year's edition.

Winner was an interactive gameshow divided into two editions, Winnder Do (Before) and Winner Pislya (After). The first part gave a multiple-choice question with a digital code, while viewers called in during the next half-hour. After that came the second part where the presenter returned to give the correct code, as well as names of the winners.

== Personalities ==
The channel served as a springboard for what would become successful presenters and media people in Ukraine:

- Hanna Bezliudna (currently CEO of Inter Media Group) — in 1992, she was appointed presenter and journalist at UT-3, having worked at UT-1 before)
- Ігор Кондратюк (currently a TV presenter and producer, and member of the juries of X-Factor Ukraine and Ukraine's Got Talent on STB) — he was the presenter of the game show 5+1 on this channel in 1992—1994)
- Anatoliy Bondarenko (currently a journalist, editor and presenter at Inter) — in 1992, he was one of the founders of UT-3, chief editor of the Saturday schedule, author and presenter of programmes such as Hit-rik, Dlya vas (For You), Winner and others, co-author and presenter of Adult Nighttime Entertainment. These programs often attracted viewers because they aired live
- Hanna Bezulyk (currently a journalist who has worked for 1+1, 5 Kanal and Inter, appointed associated professor of the Department of Journalism and New Media at the Borys Grinchenko Kyiv Metropolitan University in 2016) — in January 1992, she began her career as a journalist at UT-3, also assisting in programmes such as Winner, Ridicule and Cool News. She was in charge of preparing news and information content
