= My-Ukraina =

- Country: Ukraine
- Broadcast area: Ukraine, worldwide (on YouTube)

Programming
- Language: Ukrainian
- Picture format: 576i 16:9 (SDTV), HDTV 1080i

Ownership
- Owner: Igor Petrenko (de jure); Andriy Yermak (de facto)
- Key people: Yuri Sugak
- Sister channels: My-Ukraina+

History
- Launched: October 18, 2022 (online broadcasting); November 7, 2022 (digital broadcasting); December 31, 2022 (satellite broadcasting)
- Replaced: Ukraine (TV channel); Ukraine 24
- Closed: February 16, 2024 (satellite broadcasting)

Links
- Website: http://weukraine.tv/

Availability

Terrestrial
- KRRT: MX-7 (44)

My-Ukraina (Ukrainian: Ми-Україна, lit. 'We Are Ukraine') is a Ukrainian news television channel owned by Igor Petrenko. The channel was founded in October 2022 and is staffed by personnel of the former Ukraine TV channel. It is one of the two successor channels to the Ukraine TV channel, the other being My-Ukraina+.

On October 13, 2022, the State Committee for Television and Radio-broadcasting in Ukraine confirmed to consider the application of Ми — Україна LLC for the issuance of a national TV broadcasting license.

== History ==
As a successor network to both the Ukraine TV channel, as well as the news channel Ukraine 24, My-Ukraina started broadcasting on YouTube on October 18, 2022. On October 19, 2022, the National Council on Television and Radio Broadcasting issued a satellite license to Ми — Україна LLC, the license was issued for 10 years. On November 3, the National Television and Radio Broadcasting Council of Ukraine issued a temporary permit to the company to broadcast on the national MX-2 of the DVB-T2 digital terrestrial network, and it started broadcasting terrestrially on November 7, 2022. It replaced the closed Ukraine 24 channel for the period of martial law. The station plans to also broadcast entertainment formats after the end of the war.

On November 8, 2022, the TV channel joined the "United News" telethon.

At the moment, around 200 employees are working for My Ukraina.

On February 16, 2024, the TV channel stopped satellite broadcasting.

== Leaders ==
- Igor Petrenko
- Yuriy Sugak
