= Inter+ =

- Country: Ukraine
- Broadcast area: Ukraine; Europe; United States
- Headquarters: Kyiv

Programming
- Languages: Ukrainian, Russian
- Picture format: 16:9 (576i, SDTV), HDTV 1080i

History
- Launched: January 13, 2003

Links
- Website: interplus.ua

"Inter+" (Ukrainian: Інтер+) is a Ukrainian international television channel, the international version of the Ukrainian television channel "Inter". It is part of the media conglomerate "Inter Media Group".

== History ==
In the late 1990s, the Inter TV channel launched its international version. Initially, the TV channel was intended for those viewers who could not do without the TV programs that aired during the break (1:00 p.m.—6:00 p.m.). Spoke on cable networks Kyiv and mostly showed Russian "ORT" content.

As a satellite TV channel, Inter+ began broadcasting on January 13, 2003. This is the international version of the "Inter" TV channel with the addition of programs from other Ukrainian productions.

Agreements have been concluded for the distribution of the TV channel in the cable and cellular television networks of Russia, Belarus, Moldova, Armenia, Bulgaria, Latvia, Lithuania, Estonia, Germany, Czech Republic, Slovakia, Canada, USA, Israel, Australia and New Zealand.

The "Inter+" program strategy includes programs from different regions of Ukraine. At one time, "Inter+" worked with more than 120 Ukrainian television companies, production studios and creative associations. The channel showed live events significant for Ukraine: the meeting of the Supreme Court of Ukraine, the inauguration ceremony of the President of Ukraine Viktor Yushchenko, the plenary session of the Verkhovna Rada of Ukraine, the election of the Prime Minister .

In 2007, contracts were signed for the broadcast of basketball and football matches. As a result of cooperation with the TV channel "Megasport" sports projects appeared on the air: "100% Dynamo", "Fifth quarter" (about basketball), "In version" (about champions and heroes) and "Unsporting life" (about the reverse side of championship medals). Also until 2014, broadcasts of the Ukrainian Football Championship were broadcast.

In 2007, the hit parade of Ukrainian clips "Ukrainian Twenty" took place, in the same year the channel broadcast the Ukrainian version of the Russian TV show Ukrainian League of KVK.

Since January 1, 2013, transmissions from Amos 3 (4°W) and Telstar 12 (15°W) satellites have been stopped. The TV channel broadcasts from the satellite Astra 4A (4.8°E).

Since March 3, 2014, the TV channel has started broadcasting in open access on the Astra 4A satellite (4.8°E).

Since October 15, 2016, the TV channel has been broadcasting in the widescreen 16:9 image format with the related TV channel "Inter".

On January 1, 2021, the TV channel stopped broadcasting on the territory of Russia.

On April 12, 2021, the TV channel started broadcasting in the high-definition standard.

Due to the Russian invasion of Ukraine from February 24 to April 19, 2022, the TV channel broadcast the informational marathon "United News". There was no advertising on the air.

From April 20, 2022, the TV channel resumed independent broadcasting, changing the program grid. Soviet and Russian films were removed from the air.

== Ether Filling ==
=== Programs ===
Now on the air:

- "6 Acres"
- "The Greatest Ukrainians" (Ukrainian: Velyki Ukraïntsi)
- "Rechdok"
- "Let's Cook Together"
- "War Stories"
- "Useful Program"
- "Legendary Castles of Ukraine"
- "Oryol i Reshka" (Russian: Oryol i Reshka)
- "False History"
- "Out of Sight"
- "The Truth of Life"
- "Physical Evidence"
- "Here People"
- "Successful Project"
- "Travel Extravaganza"
- "School of Doctor Komarovsky" (Russian: "School of Doctor Komarovsky")
- "Looking for You"

=== Archive Programs ===
- "Agents of Influence"
- "Gate of Time"
- "Bless You"
- "Cost of Living"
- "Rechdok: A Special Case" (Rechdok: Russian: "Rechdok: A Special Case")
- "Big Politics with Yevgeny Kiselyov"
- "Big Difference in Ukrainian"
- "Evening quarter"
- "Everything for You" (Russian: "Everything for You")
- "Let's Get Married" (Russian: "Let's Get Married") (Russia)
- "The House is the Envy of All"
- "Good Health at Inter"
- "Good Evening at Inter"
- "Living wealth of Ukraine"
- "Life on the Edge"
- "They were healthy"
- "Quality Mark"
- "Patriot Games"
- "Karaoke on the Square"
- "Square meter"
- "Access code"
- "Criminal cases"
- "Cooler than Everyone Else" (Russian: "Cooler than Everyone Else")
- "Step to the Stars"
- "Key moment"
- "Legends of Criminal Investigation"
- "Legends of Gangster Kyiv"
- "Legends of Gangster Odesa"
- "I Like to cook"
- "Master class"
- "Mystical Ukraine"
- "Places of Power"
- "My Country"
- "Around M"
- "Sunday with Kvartal"
- "Incredible love stories"
- "Alone in the field"
- "Parallel World"
- "Details"
- "Details of the Week"
- "Travels Around the World"
- "Travels in Galicia"
- "Cinderella for Baskov" (Russia)
- "Made in Ukraine"
- "Rules of Survival"
- "Hidden reality"
- "Morning with Inter"
- "Morning Mail" (Russian: "Morning Mail") (Russia)
- "Make the comedian laugh"
- "Garden Tips"
- "Spice"
- "Skeptic"
- "Witness: Agents"
- "Freedom at Inter"
- "Secrets of Fate"
- "Family Court"
- "Smartshow"
- "Skarb.ua"
- "Applies to Everyone"
- "Fear in Your House"
- "Court Cases: Crime and Punishment"
- "Judge for Yourself"
- "Secrets of the Criminal World"
- "Secrets of the World"
- "Silent terror: Chronicles of Hell"
- "Ukraine is Amazing"
- "Ukraine: Forgotten History"
- "Ukraine, wake up!"
- "In Search of Adventure"
- "In Search of Truth"
- "Formula of Love"
- "Civilization Incognita"
- "Black Mirror"
- "Chef of the Country"
- "Schuster Live"

=== Series ===
- "33 square meters"
- "Wolf"
- "Streets of broken lanterns"
- The Greek Woman"
- "My Dear Man"
- "Lace of Fate"
- "Engagement"
- "One day there will be love"
- "Doomed to become a star"
- "Simple truths"
- "Native people"
- "Svaty" (seasons 1-5)
- "Your team"
- "Blood Sisters"
- "Tango for three"
- "Three Sisters"
- "Territory of Beauty"
- "Secrets of Investigation"
- "Diary of a Pregnant Woman"
- "Eureka"
- "Guardian Angel"

== Satellite broadcast options ==
Companion	Standard	Frequency, MHz	Speed	Polarization	FEC	Image format	Coding
Astra 4A (4.8°E)	DVB-S2	12437	30000	vertical (V)	2/3	MPEG-4	FTA
