= UT-2 (TV channel) =

Ukrainian national television channel (1992–2004)

- Country: Ukraine
- Broadcast area: Ukraine
- Headquarters: Kyiv, Ukraine

Programming
- Language: Ukrainian
- Picture format: 4:3 SDTV

Ownership
- Owner: National Television of Ukraine
- Sister channels: UT-1; UT-3 (until 1995)

History
- Launched: 1 January 1992; 34 years ago
- Closed: 5 September 2004
- Replaced by: 1+1

UT-2 (Ukrainian: УТ-2), formally known as the Second Channel of the National Television of Ukraine (Ukrainian: Другий канал національного телебачення України), was a Ukrainian public television channel, operated by NTU. It was created on the basis of the former Ukrtelefilm studios. Broadcasts began on 18 May 1991 on the frequency network formerly used to relay Soviet Central Television's Second Programme; and from 1 January 1992, began official broadcasts on its own network.

Beginning in 1997, UT-2 started giving airtime to 1+1, after which, on 5 September 2004, UT-2's broadcasts ceased and were handed over completely to 1+1 full-time.

== History ==
At the very beginning it shared airtime with the Russian channel RTR, which would ultimately replace the Second Programme full-time in independent Russia later that year.

The channel's schedule had a cultural output. It also aired specialist blocks such as the Educational Channel (Ukrainian: Загальноосвітній канал) and the Sports Channel (Ukrainian: Спортивний канал).

On 26 June 1992, UT-3 started broadcasting, taking over part of the UT-2 and RTR frequencies. UT-3 was made for a slightly younger audience, whereas UT-2 broadcast more highbrow programming of a cultural or scientific nature.

On 14 August 1995, UT-3 ceased broadcasting as a channel on the UT-2 network.

On 3 September 1995, RTR ceased broadcasting on UT-2, allowing the channel to broadcast all day under its own programming.

On 1 January 1997, UT-2 started timesharing with Studio 1+1, whose output was seen in 1995—1996 on UT-1. From that day until 5 September 2004, UT-2 shared its frequency with 1+1. Studio 1+1's broadcasts on UT-2's network were divided into two blocks: mornings (until 10am) and evenings. Since the 10am-6pm block (reducing over time) was not licensed by the National Radio and Television Council, the network continued transmitting programming on behalf of NTU under the UT-2 name. In particular, educational programmes continued to be shown as part of the "Educational Channel for Students" (Ukrainian: Освітній канал для школярів), with documentaries, cultural and entertainment programmes, produced by the Golden Gate TV and Radio Company (Ukrainian: ТРК «Золоті ворота») and other NTU partners.

From 2002 Kultura's programmes were broadcast on UT-2's terrestrial network; and from 4 August 2003 to 2 September 2004, Kultura broadcast on its frequencies on weekdays from 11am to 12pm.

On 1 August 2003, the broadcast of the regional channels moved from First National to the UT-2 network (from 12pm to 2pm), thus reducing its airtime to two hours a day.

On 30 July 2004, 1+1 received the right to broadcast 24 hours a day, and, on 5 September, the airtime from 10am to 2pm was handed over to the private company, thus closing UT-2.
