= 1+1 Ukraine =

National Ukrainian-language TV channel

- Country: Ukraine
- Broadcast area: Ukraine
- Headquarters: Kyiv, Ukraine

Programming
- Language: Ukrainian
- Picture format: 16:9 (576i, SDTV); 16:9 (1080i, HDTV)

Ownership
- Owner: 1+1 Media Group

History
- Launched: 24 December 2022

Links
- Website: 1plus1.ua

Availability

Terrestrial
- Zeonbud: MX-1 (2)

1+1 Ukraine (Ukrainian:: 1+1 Україна) is a Ukrainian television channel. It is part of the media conglomerate 1+1 Media, owned by Ihor Kolomoiskyi and Ihor Surkis. The channel is a back-up of the main 1+1 channel, which is currently relaying the United News telethon as 1+1 Marafon.

== History ==
On December 15, 2022, the National Council of Ukraine on Television and Radio Broadcasting reissued the license for the international channel 1+1 International, changing its name to 1+1 Ukraine.

On December 22, the National Council issued a temporary permit for broadcasting 1+1 Ukraine during the period of martial law in Ukraine and broadcasting in the MX-2 multiplex of the DVB-T2 digital broadcast network for a period of one year.

The TV channel started broadcasting on December 24. The launch of the channel was affected by marketing issues, as the main 1+1 channel, the most valuable asset of the group, was affected by the broadcast of the United News marathon.

On November 23, 2023, the channel entered a bidding contest to take part in the digital terrestrial (DVB-T2 standard) MX-2 multiplex under the legal entity Віжн 1+1 (English: Vision 1+1).

On January 1, 2024, the regulator changed the logo of the ТРК "Студія 1+1" entity for satellite broadcasting from 1+1 Ukraina to 1+1 Marafon. At the same time, 1+1 Ukraina changed its legal entity to Віжн 1+1.

On July 11, 2024, the channel won a license to operate on the MX-1 multiplex under the name "1+1 Україна+". On August 8, the channel's logo associated with this license was changed to 1+1 Україна (English: 1+1 Ukraine). The next day, it moved from MX-2 to MX-1.

In the autumn season, the channel brought back Argument Kino for the first time since 2016, a program where the airing of a Ukrainian movie was accompanied by relevant commentary.

TSN: A Special View, a cycle of themed TSN documentaries, was broadcast in November in conjunction with the 2024 United States presidential election. In December 2024, the channel started plans for an adaptation of Wheel of Fortune.

On 16 July 2025, the Ukrainian Ministry of Culture designated it as a critical importance channel, in order for its staff not to be mobilized.

== Presenters ==
- Alla Mazur
- Nataliia Moseichuk
- Ruslan Senichkin
- Lyudmyla Barbir
- Nelya Shovkoplyas
- Egor Gordeev
- Yuriy Gorbunov
- Kateryna Osadcha
- Timur Miroshnychenko
- Vira Kekelia
- Valentina Khamayko
- Olexandr Popov
- Olexiy Sukhanov
