= UNIAN. Serial =

National Ukrainian-language TV channel

- Country: Ukraine
- Broadcast area: Ukraine
- Headquarters: Kyiv, Ukraine

Programming
- Language: Ukrainian
- Picture format: 16:9 (576i, SDTV); 16:9 (1080i, HDTV)

Ownership
- Owner: 1+1 Media Group

History
- Launched: 28 July 2010
- Former names: UNIAN TV (2010–2025)

Links
- Website: https://unian.tv

Availability

Terrestrial
- Zeonbud: MX-1 (8)

UNIAN. Serial (Ukrainian: УНІАН. Серіал) is an all-Ukrainian language film TV channel, owned by 1+1 Media Group.

== History ==
On July 28, 2010, a test broadcast of the UNIAN TV channel (Ukrainian Independent Information Agency) of the eponymous news agency began, which, like 1+1 Media Group, is then-part of Igor Kolomoisky's "Privat" financial and industrial group.

From June 1, 2017, it broadcasts in 16:9 format. In 2017, the TV channel taught Ukrainians English in the channel's promo blocks.

Since the same year, UNIAN TV has been publishing news from the UNIAN website. Earlier, until the end of 2017, there were live broadcasts from this news agency.

On December 20, 2019, the National Council of Ukraine on Television and Radio Broadcasting renewed the licenses of the TV channels of the 1+1 Media Group - PLUSPLUS and UNIAN, allowing them to "exchange logos" and program concepts. That is, networks of channels. On November 20 of the same year, the National Council allowed UNIAN TV channel to enter the national digital network DVB-T2 without a competition, moving to the MX-3 multiplex. At the same time, the UNIAN TV channel changed its legal entity from UNIAN TV LLC to Gravis LLC. On December 26, 2019, PLUSPLUS began broadcasting in the MX-3 multiplex of the national digital network DVB-T2.

Since January 2020, UNIAN has been broadcasting instead of PLUSPLUS in the regional multiplex of the RRT Concern in Odesa Oblast.

On September 1, 2020, the TV channel started broadcasting in the high definition standard (HD).

On December 8, 2021, the TV channel received a license to broadcast in the MX-3 multiplex of the digital terrestrial network DVB-T2 by changing the logo of the TV channel "Argument TV" to "UNIAN TV" and reissuing the license from MX-4 to MX-3. "Argument TV" was created on October 28, 2021 with a digital license from the TV channel "M2" (LLC "Djivan").

On December 22, at the request of 1+1 Media Group, the National Council reissued the satellite license of the TV channel to Djivan LLC, revoking Gravis LLC.

On January 1, 2022, the TV channel started broadcasting in the MX-3 multiplex of the DVB-T2 digital terrestrial network.

In connection with the Russian invasion of Ukraine, from February 24 to November 27, 2022, the TV channel broadcast the informational marathon "Edyny Novyny". From November 28, the TV channel partially resumed independent broadcasting, changing the program grid. Russian-language programs are broadcast in Ukrainian dubbing.

On February 16, 2023, the National Council reissued the license of three regional TV channels for broadcasting under a single brand: "UNIAN. Zaporizhia", "UNIAN. Dnipro", "UNIAN. Kharkiv" in local MX-5 multiplexes on 44, 47 and 53 TECs, respectively.

On January 1, 2024, the TV channel almost completely resumed independent broadcasting: "Edyny Novyny" broadcasts from 01:00 to 07:00.

On July 24, the regulator reissued the logo of the legal entity Digivan LLC for broadcasting from UNIAN TV to UNIAN. Serial.

== Programming ==
- Zahublenny svit (Lost World)
- Svit navyvorit (The World Inside Out)
- Istoriya pytannya (History question)
- Ukrayina. Povernennya svoyeyi istoriyi (Ukraine. Reclaiming your story)
- Pomsta pryrody (Revenge of nature)

== Archive ==
- TSN. Week
- Spetskor (Special correspondent)
- Pravo na vladu (The right to power)
- DzheDAI (Ledi)
- Hroshi (Money)
- Ukrainski sensatsii (Ukrainian sensations)
- Sekretni materialy (Secret materials)
- Zbroia (Weapons)
- TSN. Spetsproekt (Special project)
- ProFutbol (About football)
