= 1+1 International =

Ukrainian international TV channel

- Country: Ukraine
- Broadcast area: Worldwide
- Headquarters: Kyiv, Ukraine

Programming
- Picture format: 16:9 (576i, SDTV)

Ownership
- Owner: 1+1 Media Group
- Sister channels: 1+1; Ukraine Today

History
- Launched: 1 March 2006; 19 years ago

Links
- Website: int.1plus1.ua

1+1 International is an international TV channel aimed at the Ukrainian diaspora, broadcasting throughout North America and Europe. It is the international sister channel of the Ukrainian channel 1+1 and started broadcasting in March 2006. The channel is a part of 1+1 Media Group, related to Ihor Kolomoyskyi.

1+1 International is broadcast on a 24-hour schedule and is run by Anatoliy Yerema, the general producer and chief director. It is available by satellite and cable across the World, as well as in many hotel rooms in Europe.

== History ==
In late 2008, 1+1 International was removed from DirecTV & GlobeCast World TV in the United States and the Canadian variant of the channel, which was owned by Ethnic Channels Group, was relaunched as TONIS. 1+1 International is now available again in Canada, after being picked up by IMB+ Records, an IPTV provider.

On 10 March 2016, 1+1 International re-launched in Canada, as a foreign service, via Bell Fibe TV.

Sometime in April 2022, 1+1 International was re-added to DirecTV on channel 321, the channel space was previously used for RT America.

On 7 July 2022, 1+1 International was removed from DirecTV after experiencing "temporary technical difficulties" since 4 July. The channel space currently shows a slide reading "This channel is no longer available. We regret any inconvenience." It was later revealed that the channel was dropped as it had stopped its 24/7 coverage of the 2022 Russian invasion of Ukraine and began adding entertainment programming.

On 11 June 2022, the channel restored part of its schedule, reducing the airtime given to the United News service. The Russian-language programs have since been dubbed to Ukrainian.

On 15 December 2022, the State Committee for Television and Radio-broadcasting re-issued the license of 1+1 International and approved a rebranding to "1+1 Ukraina", which became a backup channel for the media group's main channel 1+1. Consequently a new license was applied for 1+1 International's continuation on 22 December.

== Programming ==
The programming of 1+1 International is composed of various productions from the original 1+1 channel.

=== TSN (Television News Service) ===
TSN is broadcast live from Kyiv and provides news broadcasting for the channel.

=== Cultural Projects ===
The cultural projects Document, Telemania, Svoye Kino, Proty Nochi, Monology and Ostannya Barykada are broadcast on 1+1 International.

=== Talk shows ===
The channel also airs the talk shows Tabu and Bez Tabu.

=== Documentaries and TV series ===
Den Narodjennya Burjuya (The Bourgeois Birth Day) and Ukradene Shchastya (Stolen Happiness), as well as many more shows, are broadcast on the channel.

=== Webcam Project ===
WEB Cam is a project planned to fill the technical broadcasting intervals, with live images of the central Maidan Nezalezhnosti square in Kyiv, as well as other areas in different cities.

== See also ==
- 1+1
- 2+2
