= OpenWeatherMap =

UK-based online weather service

- Founded: 2012
- Founder: Denn Ukolov, Olga Ukolova
- Headquarters: London, UK
- Area served: Worldwide
- Owner: OpenWeather Ltd.
- Website: openweathermap.org

OpenWeatherMap is an online service, owned by OpenWeather Ltd, that provides global weather data via API, including current weather data, forecasts, nowcasts, and historical weather data. The company provides a minute-by-minute hyperlocal precipitation forecast. The convolutional machine learning model uses meteorological broadcast services and data from airport weather stations, on-ground radar stations, weather satellites, remote sensing satellites, METAR, and automated weather stations.

The company has more than 2 million customers, ranging from independent developers to Fortune 500 companies.

The APIs provided by OpenWeatherMap have resulted in repositories on GitHub. The APIs support multiple languages, units of measurement, and industry standard data formats like JSON and XML.

== Company Profile ==
OpenWeather Ltd is a UK-based company that provides global environmental data using artificial intelligence and machine learning. At 2022 it served more than six million users. They deliver more than two billion forecasts each day and their products are specialized for energy, logistics, agriculture, and other industries. OpenWeather works with organizations like the Met Office and the U.S. National Oceanic and Atmospheric Administration. They are members of both the World Meteorological Organization and the European Space Agency. The company also runs the OpenWeather Foundation, which supports open data access, education, and sustainability efforts.

== Products and services ==
OpenWeatherMap provides weather maps, weather alert services, and weather data. The length of the nowcast reaches 2 hours, the short-term forecast reaches 16 days, and the long-term forecast can reach up to 1 year. Historical weather data goes over 40 years.

In 2015, Google chose OpenWeatherMap as a weather data provider for its bid-by-weather script in Google Ads, which serves the ads based on the local weather conditions, such as temperature, humidity, and cloudiness. In the same year, Google published documentation on how to use OpenWeather data to display weather conditions on Google Maps.

In 2020, Samsung included OpenWeatherMap into their Galaxy Watch Studio as weather data for the Galaxy Watch.

In 2020, OpenWeatherMap released its weather application for iOS and Android.

OpenWeather provides data for weather risk management on an individual agreement basis. OpenWeather also operates under a Creative Commons Attribution-Share Alike license, providing free access to the APIs that include current weather, a minutely forecast for 1-hour, short-term history, weather maps, alerts, geocoding, air quality weather triggers, and weather widgets.

== See also ==
- AccuWeather
- Weather Underground
- ClimaCell
- Visual Crossing
