= TET (TV channel) =

Ukrainian television channel

- Country: Ukraine
- Broadcast area: Ukraine
- Headquarters: Kyiv, Ukraine

Programming
- Language: Ukrainian
- Picture format: 16:9 (576i, SDTV)

Ownership
- Owner: 1+1 Media Group

History
- Launched: 24 January 1992

Links
- Website: Official website

Availability

Terrestrial
- Zeonbud: MX-2 (12)

TET is a Ukrainian-language national entertainment TV channel broadcasting in Ukraine. It is part of the large 1+1 Media Group, and broadcasts to more than 100 cities in Ukraine, with a technical penetration of 92.4%. The target audience of the channel is 8–40 years old.

== History ==
The TV channel launched in Kyiv on January 24, 1992, under the name Tet-a-tet, and became the first alternative to “solid” state television. Until the end of 1993 it timeshared with the pair of Channel 4 Ostankino and Russian Universities.

On August 21, 1995, the National Council of Ukraine on Television and Radio Broadcasting gave TV channels TET and TRK Kyiv the same broadcast frequency, UHF channel 30. The situation was decided on August 18, 2003, in which TET received a license for channel 42, and TRK Kyiv remained on channel 30. Thus, both channels since were able to conduct round-the-clock broadcasting.

On April 24, 2004, TET has changed its logo and graphic design. Since then, reality shows, talk shows, television series, humorous programs, cartoons, and sports broadcasts are presented. There are no political programs or news on the TV channel. The channel covers 92.4% of the territory of Ukraine.

Since 2009, TET has been part of 1+1 Media Group.

On February 14, 2011, TET rebranded.

From February 21, 2014, to March 31, 2016, the post of TET General Producer hired Natalia Vashko. Since April 2016, the General Producer of the channel is Victoria Shulzhenko.

From December 1, 2016, TET switched their television aspect ratios, transitioning into 16:9.

On August 12, 2019, the TV channel conducted another rebranding in order to change the target audience. The slogan of the TV channel became an expression: "Tap - and your smile".

On September 16, 2019, Victoria Shulzhenko (Levchenko), left the position to run 1+1 Productions.

From October 11 to the duties of the General Producer TET, which is now part of the business unit "TV Business", Oksana Petrishin was assigned to 1+1 Media since 2017.

On March 2, 2020, the channel began broadcasting in high definition.

In connection with the Russian invasion of Ukraine on February 24, 2022, the channel broadcast the information marathon "Defense of Ukraine" from 1+1 Media around the clock. From February 25 to April 10, the channel reprogrammed its schedule with commercial–free children's programming.

Since April 11, 2022, the channel has restored its programming schedule: Russian-language programs and series have been translated into Ukrainian.

On April 8, 2024, the Ministry of Culture and Information Policy of Ukraine granted the channel's license holder (PJSC ""TET" TV Company") the status of critically important. Thus, its employees may be reserved from mobilization.

== Ratings ==
In 2016, the average viewer count per day by the target audience amounted to 7.4%, a record in the history of the existence of a TV channel.

In 2020, the channel share amounted to 3.22% in the demographic of ages 18 to 54, placing it 8th among Ukrainian TV channels, according to the Nielsen ratings.

== Programming ==
=== In-house produced shows ===
- Goddess of Shopping
- BarDuck
- Queen of the Ball
- Masha and Models
- Durniev+1
- TET's Dad/TET's Mom
- Nasty Girls (sketch comedy)

=== Imported shows ===
- True Blood
- Game of Thrones
- Walking Dead

== Criticism ==
According to the results of monitoring made by Boycott Russian Films, campaign activists during the period from September 8 to 14, 2014, the channel broadcast an average of 4 hours and 45 minutes of Russian content per day.

The boycott activists published data on September 27, 2014, that the share of Russian-speaking content was about 33%.

== Logo ==
The TV channel has changed 13 logos. The current one is 14th behind medicine.

From 1992 to 1997 - was in the lower right corner. From 1997 to 1999 and from 2002 to 2003 - in the left upper corner. From 1999 to 2000 the logo was in the lower right corner. From 2001 to 2002 the logo was located in the lower left corner. From 2000 to 2001 and from 2003 to the present time stands in the upper right corner.

- From January 24, 1992, to January 23, 1997, the logo was a blue rectangle with the word "TET A-TET" in white font. Was in the lower right corner. In 1993, the logo was black.
- From January 24, 1997, to 23 March 1999, the logo was the word "tete" with a blue thin font. It was in the left upper corner.
- From March 24, 1999, to November 30, 2000, the logo was the defeat of the word "TET" of green. It was in the lower right corner.
- From December 1, 2000, to May 31, 2001, the logo was a square in which a circle was introduced, which was divided into two parts vertically. Parts were not the same, Left was 30%, right - by 70%. In the left small part of the left, the word thin font "TET" was inscribed, which was posted vertically, in the right large part was placed by a large bold figure 4 and the logo was translucent. Was in the upper right corner.
- From June 1, 2001, to 9 October 2002, the logo was the word "TET" with a white thick font. Was in the lower left corner.
- From October 10, 2002, to 13 February 2003, the logo was similar to the second logo, but the word "TET" has a tricolor animation (blue-green yellow) in bold. Was there. From October 13, 2002, to 13 February 2003, the logo moved to the left upper corner.
- From February 14, 2003, to April 23, 2004, the logo was similar to the second and fifth logos, but the word "TET" was written in dark blue font. Was in the left upper corner. From April 12, 2003, to April 23, 2004, the logo moved to the right upper corner.
- From April 24, 2004, to August 31, 2010, the logo reminded the table, to the left of the letter "T" of red and pink color, to the right of the letter "T" of dark red color, on top of the letter "e" of a white color, under it there was a signature "TET" Dark - red and logo was translucent. Was in the upper right corner. In the winter and New Year's time from 2004 to 2010 on the letter "E" there was snow.
- From September 1, 2010, to February 13, 2011, the logo was the word "tete" with white bold, the symmetry lines were pink, the letter "e" was returned in a manuscript form and the logo was translucent. Was there.
- From February 14, 2011, to February 28, 2013, the logo consists of three volumetric layers yellow, purple, and blue. On the yellow layer, the letter "T", on the purple layer of the letter "E", on the blue layer the letter "T".
- From March 1, 2013, to June 25, 2014, there was the same logo, but it became animated.
- On June 26, 2014, to January 18, 2015, the logo was a yellow color of three layers, and letters of Lilov color "T", "E", "T".
- From January 19, 2015, to 17 February 2020, the logo was a translucent gray in the form of three circles, each of them is translucent letters "T", "E" and "T".
- Since 18 February 2020, the same logo is used, but it became larger and gained a yellowish shade.

== See also ==
- 1+1
- 2+2
