= 1+1 (TV channel) =

National Ukrainian-language TV channel

- Country: Ukraine
- Broadcast area: Ukraine; Worldwide (via internet)
- Headquarters: Kyiv, Ukraine

Programming
- Language: Ukrainian
- Picture format: 16:9 (576i, SDTV); 16:9 (1080i, HDTV)

Ownership
- Owner: 1+1 Media Group
- Sister channels: Domestic: 1+1 Ukraine; 2+2; TET; PLUSPLUS; Bigudi; UNIAN TV; KVARTAL TV; Comedy Central; International: 1+1 International

History
- Founded: August 1995; 31 years ago
- Launched: 1 January 1997; 29 years ago

Links
- Website: 1plus1.ua

Availability

Terrestrial
- Zeonbud: MX-1 (3)

1+1 (Ukrainian: один плюс один, romanized: odyn plius odyn) is a national Ukrainian language TV channel owned by 1+1 Media Group. It has the second-largest geographic reach of any channel in Ukraine, covering 95% of Ukraine's territory.

Since 1 December 2022, the original 1+1 channel is branded as 1+1 Marafon relaying United News. The rest of its output was spun-off to an emergency channel, 1+1 Ukraine, which started broadcasting on 24 December 2022.

== History ==
1+1 was founded in August 1995, 4 years after Ukraine's independence, headed by its original president Alexander Rodnyansky, who acted as general director from 1996 to 2002. In 2002 Rodyansky joined STS Media, and since 2004 he has been the president of that Delaware-registered Russian company.

1+1 immediately became a major force in the Ukrainian TV industry, despite early programming consisting solely of movie broadcasts. Its first broadcast was within two months of its founding, in September 1995 on UT-1, and since January 1, 1997 the channel has been broadcasting continuously on the Ukrainian national TV network UT-2 (Ukrainian: Другий загальнонаціональний канал (УТ-2), liter.: "Druhyj zahalnonatsionalnyj kanal"), with an appropriate license of the Ukrainian National Television and Radio Council.

Despite initial limited programming, 1+1 was quickly successful. Until 2004, 1+1 broadcast only for 15 hours. Its program schedule was from 7 am until 10 am, followed by a break for four hours with the UT-2 channel from 10 am until 1+1 backs, and then from 2 pm until 2 am. Beginning on 30 June 2004 the channel was given official permission to broadcast 24 hours each day. Since then, 1+1 has been able to create a complete round-the-clock broadcast schedule.

The channel started widescreen broadcasts on January 17, 2017. On September 18, 2019, the channel started broadcasting in HD. On August 24, 2020, the channel rebranded for its 25th anniversary.

1+1 became available on DIRECTV Stream in 2022 and is broadcasting News from Ukraine throughout the day.

== Programming and current schedule ==
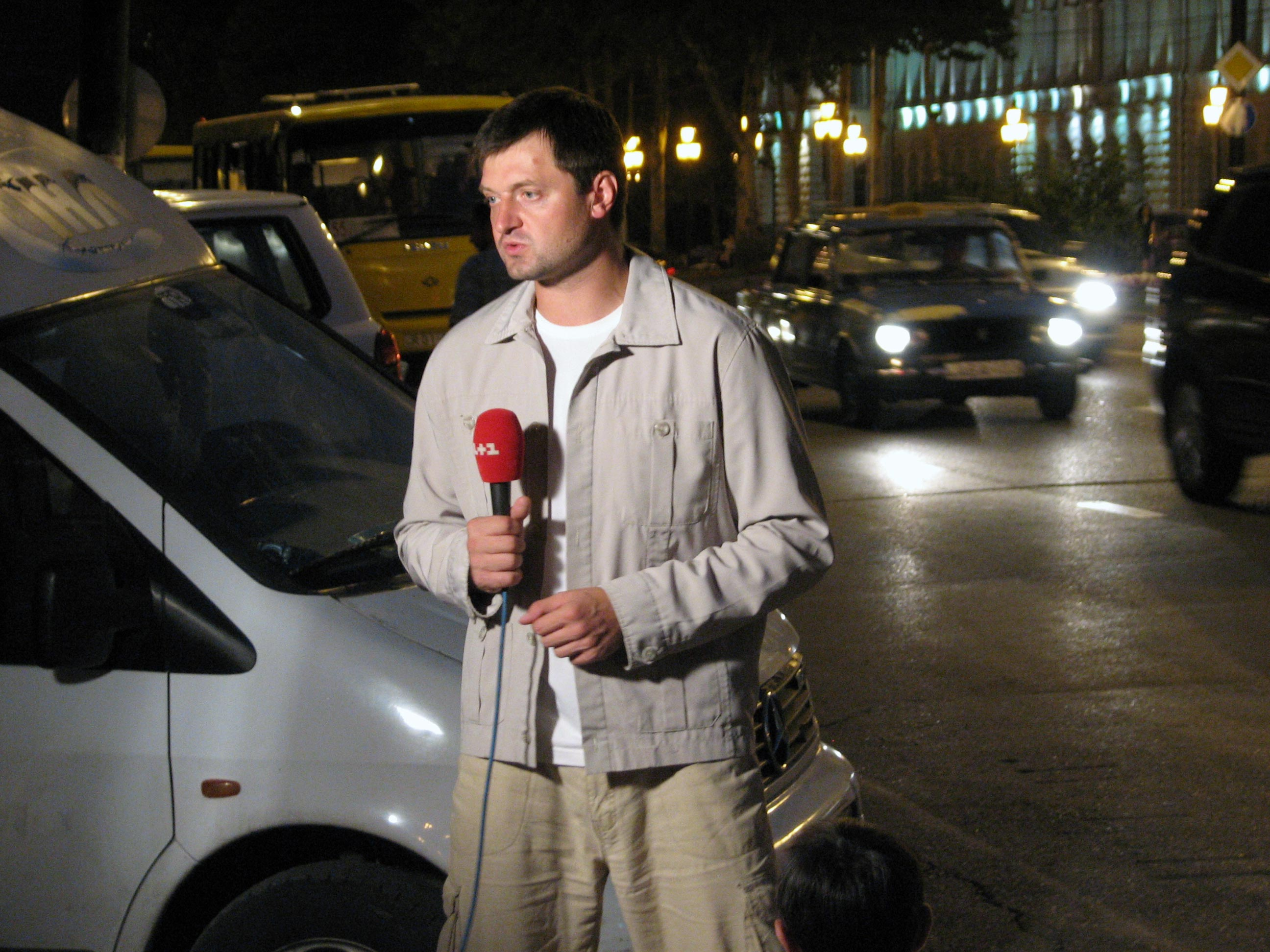
Reporter from 1+1 reporting live outside the parliament in Tbilisi during the Russian-Georgian War 2008

1+1 was the first TV project in Ukraine to start actively inviting popular TV stars and other celebrities to take part in their live shows. Since the start of Russia's 2022 invasion of Ukraine, 1+1 is participating in the United News telethon, and is not broadcasting any other programs. On December 25, 2022, 1+1 International's license was used for a new Ukrainian service "1+1 Ukraine" to broadcast 1+1 entertainment content.

The following is a list of the most popular programmes offered to 1+1 viewers:

=== TSN ===
Television Service of News (TSN) is a news service programme, which has been operating on the channel from the start, and its presenters have remained largely the same. Such names as Ala Mazur (on TSN since January 3, 1997; in 1996, 1998, 1999, and 2001 was awarded the best news presenter of the year), Ljudmyla Dobrovolska, Oles Tereshenko and some others are very familiar to those who live in Ukraine, and according to the research, these people have the highest level of trust among news viewers. The TSN series airs daily at 7:30 pm except Saturday. Oles Tereshenko leads the concluding TSN series of a day at midnight and a week as well every Sunday at 7:30 pm with the overview of political, social, and cultural life of Ukraine and the world.

=== Breakfast with 1+1 ===
Established in 2002, the program known as "Breakfast" has been in operation for several years, focusing on early morning content. Initially airing exclusively on weekdays, the show underwent expansion to encompass weekend editions starting in 2006. Over time, supplementary segments like "Fitness", "Fashion Insights", "Relaxation", and "Adventurous Journeys" were incorporated into the program's schedule. The show includes an interactive component.

=== The Voice of Ukraine ===
A reality talent show, "Holos Krainy", is part of the international syndication of "The Voice", originating from the Netherlands as "The Voice of Holland". This format, created by Dutch television producer John de Mol, revolves around a singing competition.

=== Wife Swap ===
A reality television program, "Wife Swap" is part of the international syndication. In this show, two families, often from contrasting social classes and lifestyles, exchange wives/mothers – and sometimes husbands – for a two-week period.

=== Four Weddings ===
Based on the UK version of the same name, "Four Weddings" is a reality TV program where four brides attend each other's weddings and rate various aspects such as Dress, Ceremony, Food, and Reception on a scale of thirty points.

=== Dancing with the Stars ===
A dance competition television series, "Dancing with the Stars" is part of the international syndication under the same name. The show pairs a celebrity with a professional dancer, and the couples perform pre-determined dances, competing for judges' scores and audience votes. Each week, the couple with the lowest combined judges' scores and audience votes gets eliminated, until the final champion dance pair remains.

=== Evening Quarter ===
"Vechirnii Kvartal" is a comedy series developed by Kvartal 95 Studio and created by Volodymyr Zelenskyy. Since 2012, the series has been broadcast on the TV channel. The comedy team members entertain the audience with jokes and satirical comedy sketches.

=== Social projects ===
- There are no children without parents – the joint project of 1+1, the Family and Youth Ministry and the Center of Child Adoption
- Last myth – Victor Suvorov's discussion of the historical events presented in this documentary investigation

=== Political projects ===
- Election 2006 – long-term TV-marathon on March 26–27, 2006
- 2006 elections – live TV debates for parties and political coalitions
- Debates 2002 – election run up coverage
- Five by Five – election run up coverage
- The Night of Choice – coverage of presidential electoral campaign in Ukraine on the night of October 31/November 1 and November 14/15 1999
- Space bridges – live space bridges with the most popular in their countries' TV channels GRT (Russia) and POLSAT (Poland)
- Dialogues with Democracy – the meeting of the US Secretary of State Madeleine Albright with the Ukrainian youth
- US President Bill Clinton's address to the Ukrainian people
- Big Race – satirical coverage of the current political life of Ukraine

== Logo history ==
1997

1997-2005

2004-2005

2005–present

2013-2020

2020-2022

== Criticism ==
In 1999, after broadcasting on UT-2 for two years with an appropriate license, 1+1 filed a claim with the Supreme Court of Ukraine. They requested that AITI, a TV company that had previously rented broadcasting time on UT-2, surrender its license due to a year-long programming halt. In 2000, the claim was resolved in favor of 1+1.

Channel 1+1 has been the subject of continuing criticism during the 2004 presidential election, when it was heavily criticized for twisting information in favor of Viktor Yanukovych (Prime Minister of Ukraine at the time). Such behavior was typical for a Ukrainian-wide channel, because all of the media were under heavy pressure from the Administration of the President of President Kuchma. Furthermore, critics accused the channel of being part of the Social Democratic Party of Ukraine empire.

In late November 2004 several journalists left the channel in protest against this pressure and almost all leading presenters had refused to report news. Those actions altogether with similar actions on other channels marked the beginning of the Orange revolution.

In October 2006 Alexander Rodnyansky, the General Producer of Studio 1+1, won a hard appeal process in the Supreme Court of Ukraine, after the court gave ownership of 70% of the company's shares to Ihor Kolomoyskyi, and as he had claimed, in June 2005 there was an agreement signed between himself and Rodnyansky, that 70% of the company's shares were sold to Kolomyyskyy (for ~US$70 million) in February 2010.

On the 2014–2015 New Year night the 80th Disco TV program was shown on 1+1. Oleg Gazmanov participated in it. He is one of the signatories of the petition in support of Russian actions in Crimea and Eastern Ukraine in 2014. That caused a scandal in Ukrainian society. The National Council on Television and Radio of Ukraine promised to review all facts of violation of broadcast regulations by Ukrainian TV and radio companies on the New Year night.

== See also ==
- Akim Halimov
- Vitalii Sediuk
- Savva Libkin
