= Ukrainian Independent Information Agency =

Ukrainian news agency

UNIAN УНІАН

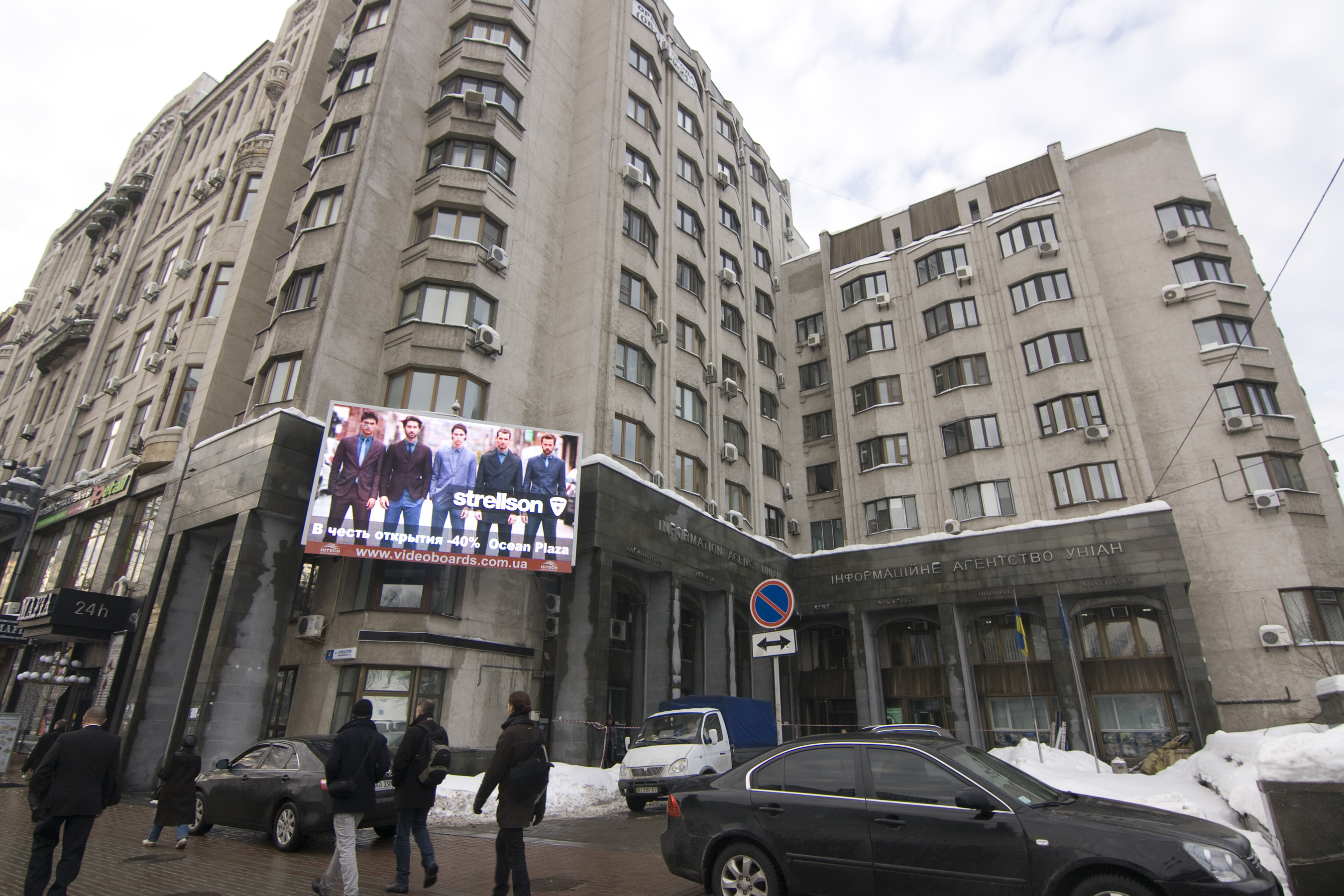
- UNIAN building, 4 Khreshchatyk Street, Kyiv
- Industry: News agency
- Founded: March 1993
- Headquarters: Ukraine
- Owner: 1+1 Media Group
- Website: unian.ua (Ukrainian) unian.net (Russian) unian.info (English)

The Ukrainian Independent Information Agency of News (Ukrainian: Українське Незалежне Інформаційне Агентство Новин, УНІАН, romanized: Ukrainsʼke Nezalezhne Informatsiine Ahentstvo Novyn, UNIAN) is a Kyiv-based Ukrainian news agency. It produces and provides political, business and financial information, and a photo reporting service. As of October 2022, it was the most visited news site in Ukraine with a 19% market share.

UNIAN is a part of 1+1 Media Group, related to oligarch Ihor Kolomoyskyi. UNIAN was founded in March 1993 as the Ukrainian Independent Information Agency of News.

The agency's offices are at 4 Khreshchatyk Street, adjacent to European Square, in Kyiv. UNIAN offers its press conference hall to interested customers.

UNIAN runs a TV channel, UNIAN TV, broadcasting news, analytical programs, documentaries, sport and movies. It is available on satellite, cable and IPTV networks. It broadcasts unencrypted from the AMOS-2 satellite (4.0 W), at 10722 Horizonal, 27500. The channel's General Producer is Vladyslav Svinchenko.

On 28 August 2013 Oksana Romanyuk, executive director of the Institute of Mass Information, wrote on her Facebook page that the UNIAN leadership locked in a room "unpleasant" editors who had previously declared censorship, and several other employees, and kept them for several hours. They were forced to sign that they were aware of the order to "move" them from the site department to the "TV news monitoring" department located somewhere in Darnytsia." Journalists called it revenge for the fact that they had previously reported on censorship: "We consider the decision of the administration as aimed at persecuting critics and citizens, as well as establishing total censorship on the UNIAN website."

== Notable people ==
- Iryna Herashchenko, a president of UNIAN in 2006–07

== See also ==
- List of newspapers in Ukraine
