= 1+1 Media Group =

Ukrainian media conglomerate

Studio 1+1, LLC
- Trade name: 1+1 Media
- Native name: ТРК «Студія 1+1»
- Romanized name: TRK «Studiia 1+1»
- Company type: Conglomerate
- Industry: Mass media
- Headquarters: Kyiv, Ukraine
- Area served: Worldwide
- Key people: Yaroslav Pakholchuk (CEO), Ihor Kolomoyskyi (Majority Shareholder)
- Products: Television, broadcasting, entertainment, advertisement production
- Owner: Privat Group
- Divisions: 1+1 Ukraine; 1+1 Media Distribution; 1+1 Digital (Note: Legally 1+1 Internet, LLC.); 1+1 Production (Note: Branded in particular as 1+1 Production Fiction or 1+1 Digital Studios.); 1+1 Rental
- Website: media.1plus1.ua/en

1+1 Media (Note: Legally romanization as Teleradiokompaniia «Studiia 1+1», which is indicated on the company's official website in English as abbreviated to TRC «Studio 1+1» and indicated as Studio 1+1, LLC in the Unified State Register of Enterprises and Organizations of Ukraine.) is one of the largest media conglomerates in Ukraine. The General Director of the Group is Yaroslav Pakholchuk.

== Structure ==
1+1 Media Group comprises seven Ukrainian TV channels, 1+1, 2+2, TET, PLUSPLUS, Bigudi, UNIAN. Serial and 1+1 International. It also controls the online news platforms TSN.ua, UNIAN, Glavred.info, Telekritika and Dusia. It had controlled the English language satellite television channel Ukraine Today until it was shut down in 2016.

The structure of the group includes the production company '1+1 Production' which is responsible for the creation of in-house TV formats and the adaptation of international formats for broadcast on the several TV channels of the group, including reality and dating shows, talent shows, scripted realities, TV series, sitcoms, documentary and sports programs, original programs and information broadcasting. The production company not only covers in-house needs, but also works with external customers.

Ukrainian oligarch Ihor Kolomoyskyi has financial interests in the group.

== Activity ==
After launching 1+1 International in 2006, which is aimed at the Ukrainian diaspora, the group started its first attempt at gaining part of the international TV market by launching the English language Ukraine Today in August 2014.

In 2012 the group started the "Green Office" project which aims to minimize negative impact on the environment.

In November 2017 1+1 Media Group launched the charity fund "You are not alone" (Ти не один), which runs multiple projects to help and encourage children battling serious illnesses, people with disabilities and ATO veterans.

In July 2018 1+1 announced the launch of the 1+1 International streaming app.

In January 2019 the Ukrainian National Council of Television and Radio refused to give 1+1's news channel UNIAN TV a digital license. The group claimed the refusal was unfounded and politically motivated.

A 1+1 Worldwide app was launched on 4 November 2024. The app contains three FAST channels: 1+1 News and 1+1 Travel; the latter of which contains two separate channels with English and Spanish dubs of Dmytro Komarov's series The World Inside Out.

== Division ==
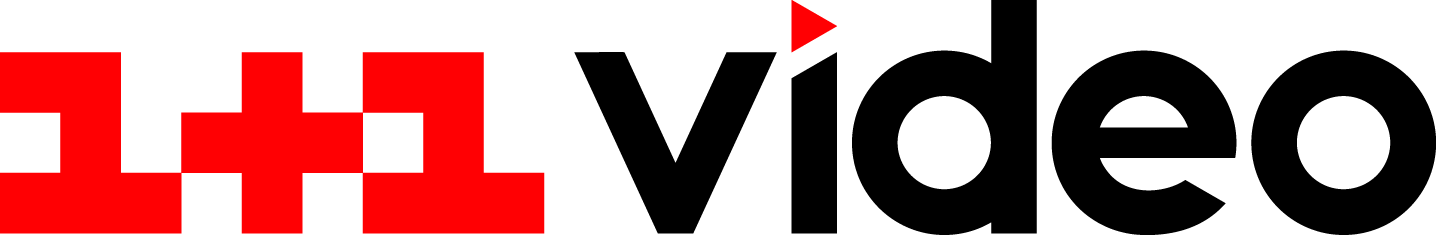
In 2017, the 1+1 Digital supported video streaming platform ovva was rebranded to 1+1 video

The main divisions of 1+1 Media include:

- 1+1 Digital is a unit that develops and maintains digital resources of 1+1 Media.
- 1+1 Production is a unit engaged in the production of original content for platforms and TV channels of 1+1 Media.

== Partnership ==
1+1 Media has a close relationship with Solutions, LLC, whose beneficiaries as of 2023 are the CEO of the only satellite television operator Vision TV, LLC, doing business as Viasat since its inception in 2006 and was acquired from Modern Times Group in 2016 year by Svitlana Mishchenko and the general director of 1+1 Media Yaroslav Pakholchuk. According to the Unified State Register of Enterprises and Organizations of Ukraine, the owners were previously other managers closely familiar with the 1+1 Media business, such as the ex-director of 1+1 Media Oleksandr Tkachenko or Ihor Kolomoiskyi's partner Timur Mindych. Vision TV, LLC, also owns Plus TV, LLC, which was founded as a joint venture with Kyivstar and does business as Kyivstar TV, in turn fully owned by Solutions, LLC.

== See also ==
- Starlight Media
- Media Group Ukraine
- UMH group
