= 2+2 (TV channel) =

Ukrainian TV channel

- Country: Ukraine
- Broadcast area: Ukraine
- Headquarters: Kyiv, Ukraine

Programming
- Language: Ukrainian
- Picture format: 16:9 (576i, SDTV)

Ownership
- Owner: 1+1 Media Group

History
- Launched: July 2006 (as Kino)
- Former names: Kino (changed to 2+2 in 2010)

Links
- Website: 2plus2.ua

Availability

Terrestrial
- Zeonbud: MX-2 (13)

2+2 (Ukrainian: два плюс два, dva plyus dva) is a national Ukrainian-language TV channel, owned by the 1+1 Media Group. Its program content is mainly aimed at a male audience, targeting a core age group of 25–44.

Due to the annexation of Crimea by the Russian Federation, 2+2 broadcasts in Sevastopol ended on 9 March 2014, at 2.30pm East European time.

2+2 broadcasts sporting events, particularly football and boxing matches. Other content includes foreign and Russian (before 2022) TV series, movies of various genres (action, sci-fi, adventure, comedy, detective, horror, disaster and historical), crime dramas and thrillers, cartoons and comedy programs, sports and entertainment shows made using in-house production.

== History ==
The channel launched on 1 July 2006 under the name Kino, taking over the VHF frequency from Gravis-7 (channel 7). A full schedule wouldn't be launched until September; during the summer period, the channel's editorial team was preparing its format. On 30 August 2010, it changed both its name and its positioning to 2+2, becoming a predominantly male channel. During six years of broadcasting the channel's technical penetration in cities with a population of over 50,000 increased from 18.5% to 89.3%, and Ukraine-wide it exceeded 83.7%. The channel's share of viewers was 2.7% at prime time (19:00–23:00) and 2.6% over the whole day for an audience aged between 18 and 54 in cities with a population of over 50,000.

In 2009 the 2+2 TV channel, then using the name Kino, received the award for Best Movie Channel from the specialist magazine Mediasat.

In 2011 it received the Mediasat award for the Best Regional TV Channel. On 5 September of that year, it rebranded.

In 2012, 2+2 was awarded the title Best Men's Channel by Mediasat, and it also obtained the rights to broadcast UEFA Champions League and UEFA Europa League matches for the season 2012–2015. Beginning in the autumn of 2012 live streams of Football Championship of Ukraine, UEFA Champions League and UEFA Europa League games have been made available on the channel's site.

== Criticism ==
In 2014 the 2+2 TV channel was criticised for broadcasting Russian serials. According to the results of monitoring carried out by activists of the Boycott Russian Films campaign during the period 8–14 September 2014 there were 8 hours of Russian content per day. According to monitoring made on 27 September 2014 the proportion of Russian content on the channel was 42%.

== Football programs ==
2+2 is the official broadcaster of the Ukrainian Premier League. Since 30 August 2010 there has been a football round-up program called ProFootball (ПроФутбол) every Sunday. Ihor Tsyganyk is the main football reporter on the show. Experts invited onto the show include Andriy Nesmachnyi (former), Viktor Leonenko (former), Serhiy Kandaurov, Serhiy Nahornyak, Ihor Shukhovtsev, Oleh Venhlinskyi, Maksym Kalynychenko, Eduard Tsykhmeystruk, Oleksandr Ishchenko.
