= Yevhen Synelnykov =

Ukrainian actor, director, and television presenter

- Born: Yevhen Oleksandrovych Synelnykov; 3 November 1981 (age 44); Zaporizhia, Ukrainian SSR, Soviet Union
- Occupations: television presenter, director, actor

Yevhen Oleksandrovych Synelnykov (Ukrainian: Євген Олександрович Синельников; 3 November 1981) is a Ukrainian TV presenter, director, actor, one of the presenter travel show "Oryol i Reshka" TV channels "Inter" and "Pyatnica!".

== Biography ==
Yevhen Synelnykov was born and raised in Zaporizhzhia. Received professional skills in the Film and Television Institute of Kyiv National University of Culture and Arts. In 2001, Yevhen starred in the miniseries "Don't leave me, love" in a cameo role. Also worked as an operator in 2005 year in the film "Pavlov's Dog". Successfully developed a career of Yevhen Synelnykov as a director. So, Yevhen was filming the show "Family dog" and all seasons "Kitchen with Dmitry Shepelev" – cooking show on the Ukrainian TV channel "Inter". To Yevhen fame came when he set about creating an entertaining travel show, "Oryol i Reshka". In 2011 year, starting with the first season when presenting was Alan Badoev and Zhanna Badoeva, Synelnykov became the permanent director of the program. Later, Yevhen became the director of "Oryol i Reshka. Shopping". As a presenting Yevhen Synelnykov tried recently: the fall of the 2014, when he had to Bordeaux to replace in the frame is late to the plane Kolya Serga.

In February 2015, the show started the 10th season of the program "Oryol i Reshka", where Yevhen attended. August 2015 aired the second part of this season, where Yevhen was a co-presenter. In December 2015, Yevhen went on a trip around the world with the TV show, which lasted 9 months.

In 2021, together with former Orla and Reshka producer Serhiy Huleikov, he launched the UkrYutubProject YouTube channel, which focused on creating Ukrainian-language content. One of his projects was the travel show Craft Travels, when he realized that craft products were becoming very popular and that trips to farms and wineries were an integral part of tourism. The first place to be covered by the project was Bessarabia. The series also covered Vinnytsia, Poltava, Kharkiv, Galicia, Tavria, the Carpathians, and Bukovyna.
