= Andriy Bednyakov =

Ukrainian actor and TV presenter (born 1987)

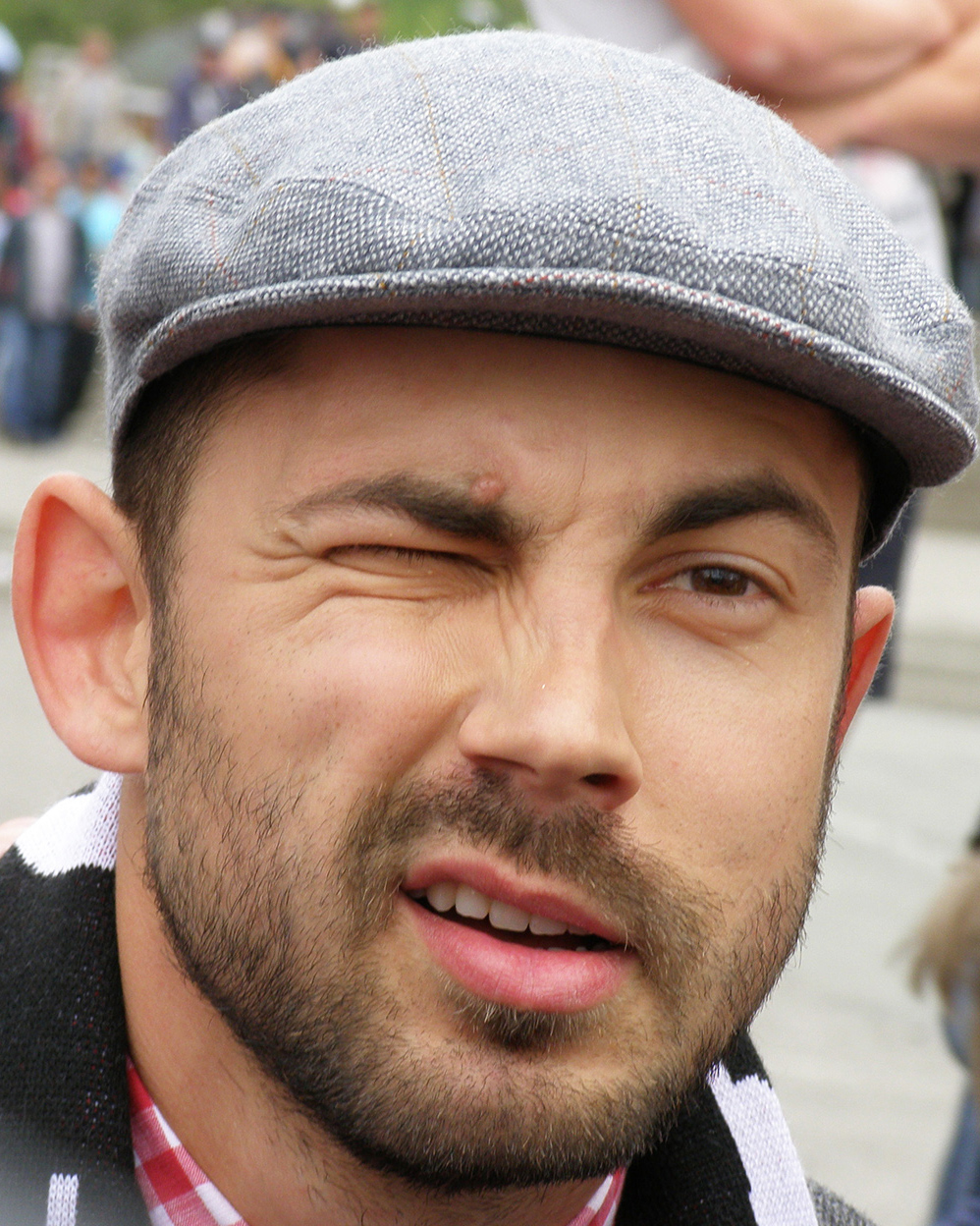
- Born: Ukrainian: Андрі́й Олекса́ндрович Бєдняко́в; 21 March 1987 (age 38); Mariupol, Ukrainian SSR
- Occupations: TV presenter, showman, comedian
- Years active: 2011 — now

Andriy Oleksandrovych Bednyakov (Ukrainian: Андрі́й Олекса́ндрович Бєдняко́в; born March 21, 1987) is a Ukrainian actor and TV presenter, best known for the television show Oryol i Reshka.

== Biography ==
Andriy Bednyakov was born on March 21, 1987, in Mariupol, Ukrainian SSR. After high school, Andrey worked for three years as an electrical mechanic at Mariupol Ilyich. While working at the factory, he absentia received higher education at Kharkiv University of Internal Affairs, after which he moved to Kyiv. He played in the top league of KVN Ukrainian.

From 2011 to 2013 — co-host of the show Oryol i Reshka on TV channel Inter. Actor of Ukrainian version of the TV show Big Difference.

In 2014 he became co-host of the Big Question, and since September 2014 - leading the new transmission BogachBednyak and Blockbusters on TV Pyatnica! (Russia).

February 8, 2015, started showing the jubilee, the 10th season of the program Oryol i Reshka in which Andriy Bednyakov people took part, along with other colleagues on the show. August 17, 2015, aired the second part of the Jubilee season Oryol i Reshka, where Andrey was the co-host again. On October 30, 2015, leads a new transmission travel — I believe — I do not believe, which tells of five interesting facts about the country, which is dedicated to the issue, one of which - false.

== Personal life ==
- Wife — actress and television presenter Anastasia Korotkaya
- Daughter — Ksenia (born September 20, 2015)

Following the 2022 Russian invasion of Ukraine, Bednyakov distributed humanitarian aid to war-torn Donetsk Oblast.

== TV shows ==
Year	Title	Original name
2009-2012	Big Difference	Большая разница (Украина) / Велика різниця
2011-2013, 2015	Oryol i Reshka	Орёл и решка / Орел і решка
2013	Great Feelings	Большие чувства
2013	Hello, I'm Your Friday!	Здравствуйте, я ваша Пятница! / Здрастуйте, я ваша П'ятниця!
2013-2014	A Date with a Star	Свидание со звездой / Побачення з зіркою
2013	Star-studded	Звезданутые / Зіркануті
2013	Superheroes	Супергерои / Супергерої
2014	How the Chip Falls	Как фишка ляжет / Як фішка ляже
2014, 2015	Big Question	Большой вопрос
2014	BogachBednyak	БогачБедняк / БогачБідняк
2014	Blockbusters	Блокбастеры / Блокбастери
2015, 2016	I believe — I do not believe	Верю — не верю
2016	X Factor	X-Фактор / X-Фактор (Украина)
2016	Provodnik	Проводник
2018	Bednyakov +1	Бедняков +1

== Filmography ==
Film
Year	Title	Role	Notes
2012	Rzhevsky versus Napoleon	guy on TV	
2015	SOS, Ded Moroz, or all come true!	Garik	

Music videos
Year	Song title	Artist
2015	Time to go Home	Svetlana Loboda
