= Oryol i Reshka =

Ukrainian television travel series

- Created by: Teen Spirit Studio; Katerina Turova; Elena Sinelnikova
- Directed by: Yevgen Synelnykov; Anton Scherbakov; Vasyl Khomko; Nikita Chizhov; Jaroslav Andrushchenko
- Starring: Alan Badoev; Zhanna Badoeva; Andriy Bednyakov; Lesia Nikitiuk; Nastya Korotka; Kolya Serga; Regina Todorenko; Yevhen Synelnykov; Pyotr Romanov; Nastya Ivleeva; Anton Ptushkin; Anastasia Ivleeva; Natalie Nevedrova; Maria Gamayun; Alina Astrovskaya; Evsey Kovalev; Anton Zaitsev; Olga Antipova; Yan Gordienko; Yuliya Koval; Vasilisa Khvostova; Michelle Andrade; Kirill Makashov; Anfisa Chernykh
- Country of origin: Ukraine
- No. of series: 26
- No. of episodes: 607

Production
- Executive producers: Natella Krapivina; Elena Synelnykova
- Producers: Kateryna Klyuchnik; David Bagiaiev; Andrei Iavita
- Editors: Nikita Chizhov; Alexander Mudryk; Andrii Kosynskyi
- Camera setup: Alexey Nazaruk; Olexandr Shevchyshyn; Oleg Shevchyshyn; Konstantin Loboda; Oleg Avilov
- Running time: 38–55 min

Original release
- Network: Inter (Ukraine); Pyatnica! (Russia); Novyi Kanal (Ukraine)
- Release: 13 February 2011

Heads and Tails (Russian: Орел и решка; Ukrainian: Орел і решка, romanized: Orel i reshka, lit. 'Oryol i reshka') is Ukrainian travel TV show that launched in 2011. It is broadcast in Ukraine, Russia (until 2022), Israel, and Kazakhstan in Russian and Ukrainian languages. Its reruns are also available on Polish and Israeli television.

Heads and Tails is hosted by two co-hosts. In each episode, the show visits another location in the world for one weekend. One of the hosts (determined by a coin toss) receives a credit card with unlimited credit (in practice, this has been limited to US$30,000 per day), called the "Golden card", while the other has to spend the weekend with US$100 including all expenses. Starting with the second season, the show has hidden a bottle with $100 in each visited location for travelers to find.

A spin-off, titled Oryol i Reshka Shopping dealing with shopping, began airing on February 15, 2014.

== Name ==
"Орел і Решка" or "Орёл и Решка" literally means "eagle and tails", referring to pre-revolutionary Russian coins with an eagle on the "heads" side.

== Hosts ==
=== Heads and Tails ===
Host	Season																										
Host	1	2	3	4	5	6	7	8	9	10	11	12	13	14	15	16	17	18	19	20	21	22	23	24	25	26	27
(Ukraine) Alan Badoev																											
(Ukraine) Zhanna Badoeva																											
(Ukraine) Andriy Bednyakov																											
(Ukraine) Lesya Nikitjuk																											
(Ukraine) Nastya Korotkaya																											
(Ukraine) Kolya Serga																											
(Ukraine) Regina Todorenko																											
(Ukraine) Yevgen Synelnykov																											
(Russia) Pyotr Romanov																											
(Ukraine) Anton Ptushkin																											
(Russia) Anastasia Ivleeva																											
(Russia) Natalie Nevedrova																											
(Russia) Maria Gamayun																											
(Ukraine) Alina Astrovskaya																											
(Russia) Evsey Kovalev																											
(Russia) Anton Zaitsev																											
(Russia) Olga Antipova																											
(Ukraine) Yan Gordienko																											
(Ukraine) Yuliya Koval																											
(Russia) Vasilisa Khvostova																											
(Ukraine) Michelle Andrade																											
(Ukraine) Kirill Makashov																											
(Russia) Anfisa Chernykh																											

=== Heads and Tails: Shopping ===
Host	Season					
Host	1	2	3	4	5	6
(Ukraine) Kosty Oktyabrsky						
(Russia) Masha Ivakova						
(Russia) Anton Lavrentyev						
(Ukraine) Egor Kaleynikov						

== Episode list ==
=== Season 1 ===
Episode #	Location	Gold card holder	First aired	Comments
1 (1)	(United States) New York City	Alan	13 February 2011	
2 (2)	(United States) Las Vegas	Alan	20 February 2011	
3 (3)	(United States) San Francisco	Zhanna	27 February 2011	Also visited Napa and Alcatraz Island
4 (4)	(United States) Los Angeles	Alan	6 March 2011	
5 (5)	(Spain) Barcelona	Alan	13 March 2011	
6 (6)	Jordan	Alan	20 March 2011	Visited Amman, Petra, Wadi Rum and River Jordan
7 (7)	Israel	Zhanna	27 March 2011	Visited Tel Aviv, Ramat Gan, Jerusalem and the Dead Sea
8 (8)	(Italy) Rome	Zhanna	10 April 2011	Also visited The Vatican
9 (9)	(Spain) Madrid	Alan	17 April 2011	
10 (10)	(Italy) Milan	Zhanna	24 April 2011	Also visited Venice, Verona and other locations in Northern Italy
11 (11)	(Cambodia) Phnom Penh	Alan	1 May 2011	Also visited Angkor Wat
12 (12)	(Thailand) Bangkok	Alan	8 May 2011	Also visited Pattaya and Ko Lan
13 (13)	(Vietnam) Ho Chi Minh City	Zhanna	15 May 2011	Also visited Da Lat and other small places
14 (14)	(Azerbaijan) Baku	Alan	22 May 2011	
15 (15)	(Georgia (country)) Tbilisi	Zhanna	29 May 2011	Also visited Batumi. This episode so no meeting between the two hosts at the end (only one of three such episodes).

=== Season 2 ===
Episode #	Location	Gold card holder	First aired	Comments
1 (16)	Mexico City	Zhanna	3 September 2011	Also visited Teotihuacan
2 (17)	(Cuba) Havana	Zhanna	10 September 2011	
3 (18)	(Netherlands) Amsterdam	Andrey	17 September 2011	Also visited Zaanse Schans
4 (19)	(Mexico) Cancún	Andrey	24 September 2011	
5 (20)	(Georgia (country)) Batumi	Zhanna	1 October 2011	Previously visited in Season 1's episode 15
6 (21)	(France) Paris	Andrey	8 October 2011	Parts of the two hosts were not filmed concurrently due to passport and visa problems
7 (22)	(Turkey) Istanbul	Zhanna	15 October 2011	
8 (23)	(Germany) Berlin	Zhanna	22 October 2011	
9 (24)	(Greece) Athens	Andrey	29 October 2011	
10 (25)	(United Arab Emirates) Dubai	Andrey	5 November 2011	
11 (26)	(Nepal) Kathmandu	Zhanna	12 November 2011	Also visited Chitwan National Park and Everest
12 (27)	(India) Mumbai	Zhanna	19 November 2011	
13 (28)	(United States) Chicago	Andrey	3 December 2011	
14 (29)	(United States) New Orleans	Zhanna	10 December 2011	
15 (30)	(United States) Dallas	Andrey	17 December 2011	
16 (31)	(Sweden) Stockholm	Zhanna	24 December 2011	
17 (32)	(Finland) Lapland	Andrey	31 December 2011	Visited Rovaniemi and surroundings. This is the only location in the show's history where it was known that the $100 holder would not be able to last the weekend, therefore Andrey paid many of Zhanna's expenses in advance.

=== Season 3 ===
Episode #	Location	Gold card holder	First aired	Comments
1 (33)	(China) Beijing	Zhanna	11 February 2012	
2 (34)	Hong Kong	Andrey	18 February 2012	Also visited Macau
3 (35)	Jamaica	Andrey	25 February 2012	Visited Kingston and its surroundings
4 (36)	(United States) Miami	Andrey	3 March 2012	Also visited Miami Beach
5 (37)	(Nicaragua) Managua	Zhanna	10 March 2012	Also visited Mombacho and other small places
6 (38)	(Lebanon) Beirut	Zhanna	17 March 2012	
7 (39)	(Brazil) Rio de Janeiro	Zhanna	24 March 2012	
8 (40)	Santiago de Chile	Zhanna	31 March 2012	
9 (41)	(Brazil) São Paulo	Andrey	7 April 2012	Also visited Iguazu Falls
10 (42)	(Peru) Machu Picchu	Zhanna	14 April 2012	Also visited Cusco
11 (43)	(Argentina) Buenos Aires	Andrey	21 April 2012	
12 (44)	Singapore	Zhanna	28 April 2012	
13 (45)	Sri Lanka	Zhanna	5 May 2012	Visited Colombo, Kiribathgoda, Bentota, Negombo and other places
14 (46)	(Malaysia) Kuala Lumpur	Andrey	12 May 2012	Also visited Selangor
15–16 (47–48)	(Ukraine) Kyiv	Andrey	19 and 26 May 2012	Double episode. Also visited Pripyat

=== Season 4 ===
Episode #	Location	Gold card holder	First aired	Comments
1 (49)	(Russia) Saint Petersburg	Andrey	8 September 2012	
2 (50)	(Scotland) Edinburgh	Andrey	15 September 2012	
3 (51)	(Kenya) Nairobi	Andrey	22 September 2012	
4 (52)	(Latvia) Riga	Lesya	29 September 2012	Also visited Jūrmala
5 (53)	(England) London	Andrey	6 October 2012	Parts of the two hosts were not filmed concurrently due to passport and visa problems
6 (54)	(Denmark) Copenhagen	Andrey	13 October 2012	Also visited Billund
7 (55)	(South Africa) Cape Town	Lesya	20 October 2012	
8 (56)	(Norway) Ålesund	Lesya	27 October 2012	
9 (57)	(Italy) Palermo	Andrey	3 November 2012	
10 (58)	Madagascar	Lesya	10 November 2012	Visited Antananarivo and other places
11 (59)	(France) French Riviera	Lesya	17 November 2012	Visited Nice, Cannes and Monte Carlo
12 (60)	(Morocco) Marrakesh	Lesya	24 November 2012	
13 (61)	(Spain) Canary Islands	Andrey	1 December 2012	Visited Puerto de la Cruz, Santa Cruz de Tenerife and other places
14 (62)	(Portugal) Lisbon	Andrey	8 December 2012	
15 (63)	(China) Shanghai	Lesya	15 December 2012	
16 (64)	(Indonesia) Bali	Andrey	22 December 2012	Visited Kuta, Jimbaran, Bedugul and other places in Bali
17 (65)	(South Korea) Seoul	Lesya	29 December 2012	

=== Season 5 ===
Episode #	Location	Gold card holder	First aired	Comments
1 (66)	(Switzerland) Swiss Alps	Lesya	9 February 2013	Visited Lucerne and its surroundings
2 (67)	(Austria) Vienna	Andrey	16 February 2013	
3 (68)	(Czech Republic) Prague	Lesya	23 February 2013	
4 (69)	(Belgium) Brussels	Andrey	2 March 2013	Also visited Bruges
5 (70)	(Italy) Venice	Andrey	9 March 2013	Previous visited in Season 1's episode 10
6 (71)	(Bolivia) La Paz	Lesya	14 April 2013	A significant part of this episode was focused on cocaine, which was censored on Russian television; also visited Uyuni and other locations in surroundings of La Paz
7 (72)	(Ecuador) Quito	Andrey	21 April 2013	Also visited the Galápagos Islands and Otavalo
8 (73)	Costa Rica	Lesya	28 April 2013	Visited San Jose, Limon, Alajuela and other locations

=== Season 6 ===
This season is titled Resort Season, in which the show visited resort towns and locations, which had not been visited in the past.

Episode #	Location	Gold card holder	First aired	Comments
1 (74)	(United Arab Emirates) Abu Dhabi	Nastya	12 May 2013	
2 (75)	(Turkey) Antalya	Andrey	19 May 2013	Also visited Pamukkale
3 (76)	(France) Corsica	Nastya	26 May 2013	Visited Ajaccio, Bonifacio and other locations
4 (77)	(Croatia) Dubrovnik	Nastya	2 June 2013	
5 (78)	Malta	Andrey	9 June 2013	Visited Valletta, Marsaxlokk, Mġarr, Mdina and other places
6 (79)	(Spain) Valencia	Andrey	16 June 2013	
7 (80)	(Greece) Crete	Nastya	23 June 2013	Visited Heraklion, Rethymno, Matala and other locations on Crete
8 (81)	(Spain) Ibiza	Andrey	30 June 2013	Visited San Antonio, Ibiza town and other places on the island of Ibiza

=== Season 7 ===
This season is titled Back to the USSR, in which the show traveled to locations in the Former Soviet Union. All countries were visited except Uzbekistan and Turkmenistan, where not all of the crew were able to obtain a visa or permission to film. Latvia was also skipped as it had been covered in a previous episode.

Episode #	Location	Gold card holder	First aired	Comments
1 (82)	(Belarus) Minsk	Nastya	25 August 2013	Also visited Belovezhskaya Pushcha National Park
2 (83)	(Lithuania) Vilnius	Andrey	1 September 2013	Also visited Snow Arena
3 (84)	(Russia) Kazan	Andrey	8 September 2013	
4 (85)	(Ukraine) Crimea	Andrey	15 September 2013	Visited Sevastopol, Yalta and other locations. Crimea was not a disputed territory at the time of the original airdate.
5 (86)	(Moldova) Chișinău	Nastya	22 September 2013	Also visited Tiraspol in Transnistria
6 (87)	(Ukraine) Odesa	Nastya	29 September 2013	
7 (88)	(Estonia) Tallinn	Nastya	6 October 2013	
8 (89)	(Russia) Lake Baikal	Andrey	13 October 2013	Visited Irkutsk and toured the lake
9 (90)	(Russia) Vladivostok	Nastya	20 October 2013	Also visited Russian island
10 (91)	(Russia) Kamchatka Peninsula	Nastya	27 October 2013	Visited Petropavlovsk-Kamchatsky and toured volcanic areas on the peninsula
11 (92)	(Russia) Grozny	Nastya	3 November 2013	Visited to town of Itum-Kali and Argun Gorge
12 (93)	(Armenia) Yerevan	Andrey	10 November 2013	Also visited Tatev and Mount Ararat
13 (94)	(Georgia (country)) Georgia	Andrey	17 November 2013	Toured Georgian mountains, avoiding major cities which the show visited in the past. The itinerary included Stepantsminda, Sighnaghi, Mestia, Velistsikhe, Ananuri, Ushguli and others
14 (95)	(Tajikistan) Dushanbe	Nastya	24 November 2013	This episode so no meeting between the two hosts at the end
15 (96)	(Kyrgyzstan) Bishkek	Nastya	1 December 2013	Visited Bishkek, Ala Archa National Park and toured the lake Issyk Kul
16 (97)	(Kazakhstan) Almaty	Andrey	8 December 2013	Also visited Astana
17 (98)	(Azerbaijan) Baku	Andrey	15 December 2013	Previous visited in Season 1's episode 14; also visited Goychay and Shaki
18 (99)	(Russia) Kaliningrad	Andrey	22 December 2013	Also visited Yantarny and Curonian Spit National Park
19 (100)	(Ukraine) Lviv	Nastya	29 December 2013	For the 100th episode, the show presented various establishments in the city, instead of the regular tour
20 (101)	(Russia) Moscow	Andrey	31 December 2013	The show celebrated New Year's Eve in Moscow

=== Season 8 ===
In this season, titled On the Edge of the World, the show traveled to locations far away from Ukraine, especially in the far east and Australia and Oceania. Hosts – Kolya Serga and Regina Todorenko.

Episode #	Location	Gold card holder	First aired	Comments
1 (102)	Maldives	Regina	2 February 2014	Visited Male, Gulhi, Maafushi and other islands
2 (103)	(Ethiopia) Addis Ababa	Kolya	9 February 2014	Visited Addis Ababa and its surroundings
3 (104)	Tanzania	Kolya	16 February 2014	Visited Dar es Salaam, Zanzibar, Tarangire National Park and Mount Kilimanjaro
4 (105)	Seychelles	Regina	23 February 2014	Visited Praslin, Victoria, Mahe, La Digue and other islands
5 (106)	(Philippines) Manila	Kolya	2 March 2014	
6 (107)	(Malaysia) (Brunei) Borneo	Kolya	9 March 2014	Did not visit Indonesian part of Borneo; visited Kota Kinabalu, Bandar Seri Begawan and smaller localities
7 (108)	(Vietnam) Hanoi	Regina	16 March 2014	Also visited Hạ Long
8 (109)	Palau	Kolya	23 March 2014	Visited Koror, the capitol at Ngerulmud, and toured the islands
9 (110)	(Australia) Melbourne	Kolya	30 March 2014	Also visited Phillip Island
10 (111)	(New Zealand) Auckland	Kolya	6 April 2014	Also visited Matamata, Rotorua, Whakarewarewa, Waiheke Island and other places
11 (112)	Vanuatu	Regina	13 April 2014	Visited Port Vila, Tanna and other places
12 (113)	(Australia) Sydney	Regina	20 April 2014	
13 (114)	(Japan) Tokyo	Regina	27 April 2014	Also visited Odaiba
14 (115)	(Japan) Kyoto	Kolya	4 May 2014	Also visited Nara
15 (116)	(Taiwan) Taipei	Kolya	11 May 2014	
16 (117)	(Mongolia) Ulan Bator	Kolya	19 May 2014	
17 (118)	(United States) Honolulu	Kolya	26 May 2014	Also visited Waianae, Kīlauea and other places
18 (119)	(United States) Alaska	Kolya	2 June 2014	Visited Juneau and its surroundings
19 (120)	(Canada) Toronto	Regina	9 June 2014	Also visited Niagara Falls
20 (121)	(Canada) Montreal	Kolya	16 June 2014	
21 (122)	Iceland	Kolya	23 June 2014	Toured Reykjavík, Blue Lagoon and other locations in south Iceland
22 (123)	Greenland	Regina	30 June 2014	Visited Nuuk and its surroundings
23 (124)	(Republic of Ireland) Ireland	Kolya	7 July 2014	Visited Dublin, Glendalough, Howth and other locations
24 (125)	Mauritius	Regina	14 July 2014	Visited Port Louis and other places
25 (126)	Panama	Kolya	21 July 2014	Visited Panama City, the San Blas Islands and various minor destinations
26 (127)	(Colombia) Bogotá	Regina	28 July 2014	Also visited Zipaquirá
27 (128)	(Argentina) Ushuaia	Regina	4 August 2014	
28 (129)	(Chile) Easter Island	Regina	11 August 2014	

=== Season 9 ===
In this season, titled Unexplored Europe, the show traveled to locations in Europe that are not generally popular with eastern european tourists.

Episode #	Location	Gold card holder	First aired	Comments
1 (130)	(France) Bordeaux	Evgeny	September 7, 2014	Visited Bordeaux, the Dune of Pilat, La Roque-Gageac, Château de Marqueyssac and other locations in Aquitaine
2 (131)	(Germany) Frankfurt	Evgeny	September 14, 2014	
3 (132)	(France) Normandy	Regina	September 21, 2014	Visited Rouen, Camembert, Deauville, Tessy-sur-Vire and Mont Saint-Michel
4 (133)	(Netherlands) Rotterdam	Regina	September 28, 2014	Also visited Kinderdijk
5 (134)	(Bosnia and Herzegovina) Sarajevo	Evgeny	October 5, 2014	Also visited Mostar and Lukomir
6 (135)	(Spain) Basque Country	Evgeny	October 12, 2014	Visited Bilbao, the Gaztelugatxe, San Sebastián and other locations in Basque Country
7 (136)	(Spain) Zaragoza	Regina	October 19, 2014	Also visited Buñol
8 (137)	(Serbia) Belgrade	Regina	October 26, 2014	Also visited Drvengrad
9 (138)	(Denmark) / Faroe Islands	Evgeny	November 2, 2014	Visited Tórshavn, Kirkjubøur and other places in the Faroe Islands
10 (139)	(Italy) Bologna	Evgeny	November 9, 2014	Also visited Asti
11 (140)	(Poland) Kraków	Regina	November 16, 2014	Also visited Wieliczka and Auschwitz
12 (141)	(Ukraine) Carpathians	Regina	November 23, 2014	Visited Rakhiv, Bukovel, Geographical midpoint of Europe, Synevyr and other locations
13 (142)	(Portugal) Azores	Evgeny	November 30, 2014	Visited São Miguel Island and Terceira Island
14 (143)	(England) Nottingham	Regina	December 7, 2014	
15 (144)	(England) Liverpool	Regina	December 14, 2014	
16 (145)	(Scotland) Glasgow	Evgeny	December 21, 2014	Also visited Isle of Skye
17 (146)	(Austria) Tyrol	Evgeny	December 28, 2014	Visited Innsbruck, Stubai Ski Resort and other locations in Tyrol

=== Season 10 ===
In this season, titled Anniversary Season, the format changed to include all previous hosts of the show, with each episode being hosted by a different couple.

Episode #	Location	Hosts	Gold card holder	First aired	Comments
1 (147)	(India) Delhi	Evgeny Sinelnikov, Regina Todorenko	Regina	February 8, 2015	Also visited Gurgaon, Agra and Jaipur
2 (148)	(China) Guangzhou	Kolya Serga, Regina Todorenko	Kolya	February 15, 2015	
3 (149)	(India) Varanasi	Evgeny Sinelnikov, Lesya Nikityuk	Evgeny	February 22, 2015	
4 (150)	(Myanmar) Mandalay	Kolya Serga, Lesya Nikityuk	Kolya	March 1, 2015	Also visited Bagan and Inle Lake
5 (151)	Guatemala	Andrey Bednyakov, Kolya Serga	Andrey	March 8, 2015	Visited Pacaya, Guatemala City, Antigua, Flores and others places
6 (152)	(Laos) Luang Prabang	Lesya Nikityuk, Nastya Korotkaya	Lesya	March 15, 2015	
7 (153)	(Egypt) Cairo	Nastya Korotkaya, Regina Todorenko	Regina	March 22, 2015	Also visited Giza and City of the Dead (in unreleased)
8 (154)	Puerto Rico	Kolya Serga, Regina Todorenko	Kolya	March 29, 2015	Visited San Juan, Fajardo and others places
9 (155)	(Dominican Republic) Dominicana	Evgeny Sinelnikov, Nastya Korotkaya	Nastya	April 5, 2015	Visited Santo Domingo, Sosúa, Bávaro and others places
10 (156)	Santiago de Cuba	Evgeny Sinelnikov, Lesya Nikityuk	Evgeny	April 12, 2015	
11 (157)	(Italy) Naples	Andrey Bednyakov, Zhanna Badoeva	Andrey	April 19, 2015	Also visited Pompeii and Mount Vesuvius
12 (158)	(United States) Washington	Evgeny Sinelnikov, Regina Todorenko	Regina	April 26, 2015	
13 (159)	(Hungary) Budapest	Kolya Serga, Zhanna Badoeva	Kolya	May 3, 2015	
14 (160)	(United States) Seattle	Andrey Bednyakov, Regina Todorenko	Andrey	May 10, 2015	Also visited San Juan Island, Coupeville and Mount Rainier
15 (161)	(United States) Arizona	Andrey Bednyakov, Evgeny Sinelnikov	Evgeny	May 17, 2015	Also visited Antelope Canyon and Page in Arizona and Utah
16 (162)	(United States) San Diego	Lesya Nikityuk, Regina Todorenko	Lesya	May 24, 2015	Also visited Chula Vista in United States and Tijuana in Mexico
17 (163)	Cape Verde	Evgeny Sinelnikov, Lesya Nikityuk	Evgeny	May 31, 2015	Visited Mindelo, Santa Luzia, Santo Antão and other islands
18 (164)	(Senegal) Dakar	Evgeny Sinelnikov, Regina Todorenko	Regina	June 7, 2015	
19 (165)	(Portugal) Madeira	Lesya Nikityuk, Regina Todorenko	Regina	June 14, 2015	Visited Funchal, Porto Moniz and others places on Madeira
20 (166)	(Spain) Sevilla	Alan Badoev, Zhanna Badoeva	Alan	June 21, 2015	

=== Season 11 ===
This season is titled Anniversary Season 2, and continues the previous format.

Episode #	Location	Hosts	Gold card holder	First aired	Comments
1 (167)	(United States) Orlando	Andrey Bednyakov, Nastya Korotkaya	Andrey	August 17, 2015	
2 (168)	(United States) Boston	Alan Badoev, Regina Todorenko	Regina	August 24, 2015	
3 (169)	(United States) Savannah	Alan Badoev, Nastya Korotkaya	Alan	August 31, 2015	Also visited Pin Point
4 (170)	(United States) Yellowstone	Andrey Bednyakov, Lesya Nikityuk	Andrey	September 7, 2015	
5 (171)	(Greece) Thessaloniki	Nastya Korotkaya, Kolya Serga	Nastya	September 14, 2015	Also visited Santorini
6 (172)	(Norway) Oslo	Lesya Nikityuk, Regina Todorenko	Lesya	September 21, 2015	
7 (173)	Albania	Evgeny Sinelnikov, Lesya Nikityuk	Lesya	September 28, 2015	Visited Tirana, Himara, Shkodër, Saranda
8 (174)	(Norway) Svalbard	Evgeny Sinelnikov, Regina Todorenko	Regina	October 5, 2015	Visited Longyearbyen, Barentsburg and others places on Svalbard
9 (175)	(Poland) Warsaw	Kolya Serga, Regina Todorenko	Kolya	October 12, 2015	
10 (176)	(United States) Detroit	Evgeny Sinelnikov, Lesya Nikityuk	Evgeny	October 19, 2015	
11 (177)	(Romania) Transylvania	Kolya Serga, Evgeny Sinelnikov	Kolya	October 26, 2015	Visited Bucharest, Malnaș, Sighișoara, Snagov and others places
12 (178)	(Canada) Quebec City	Lesya Nikityuk, Regina Todorenko	Regina	November 2, 2015	Also visited Wendake
13 (179)	(United States) Reno	Evgeny Sinelnikov, Regina Todorenko	Evgeny	November 9, 2015	Also visited Virginia City
14 (180)	(Germany) Munich	Lesya Nikityuk, Regina Todorenko	Regina	November 16, 2015	
15 (181)	Liechtenstein	Alan Badoev, Lesya Nikityuk	Lesya	November 23, 2015	Visited Nendeln, Vaduz, Balzers and others places
16 (182)	(Finland) Helsinki	Kolya Serga, Lesya Nikityuk	Kolya	November 30, 2015	
17 (183)	(Brazil) Manaus	Kolya Serga, Regina Todorenko	Regina	December 7, 2015	
18 (184)	(Peru) Lima	Evgeny Sinelnikov, Lesya Nikityuk	Lesya	December 14, 2015	Also visited Chincha Alta and Nazca District
19 (185)	(Argentina) (Chile) Patagonia	Kolya Serga, Evgeny Sinelnikov	Kolya	December 21, 2015	Visited El Calafate, El Chaltén and Los Glaciares National Park in Argentina, and Torres del Paine National Park in Chile
20 (186)	(United States) New York City	Alan Badoev, Lesya Nikityuk	Alan	December 28, 2015	Previously visited in Season 1's episode 1

=== Season 12 ===
This season, titled Around the World, returned to the older format of permanent hosts.

Episode #	Location	Gold card holder	First aired	Comments
1 (187)	(Belgium) Antwerp	Regina	February 15, 2016	
2 (188)	(Germany) Düsseldorf	Regina	February 22, 2016	Also visited Neuss
3 (189)	(Italy) Florence	Regina	February 29, 2016	Also visited Pisa
4 (190)	Namibia	Lesya	March 7, 2016	Visited Windhoek, Kolmanskop and Swakopmund
5 (191)	(South Africa) Johannesburg	Lesya	March 14, 2016	Also visited Soweto
6 (192)	(Zimbabwe) Harare	Regina	March 21, 2016	Also visited Victoria Falls
7 (193)	(Mozambique) Maputo	Lesya	March 28, 2016	Also visited Bazaruto Island
8 (194)	Uganda	Regina	April 4, 2016	Visited Kampala, Entebbe and other locations
9 (195)	(Oman) Muscat	Lesya	April 11, 2016	Also visited Al Hamra and Jebel Shams
10 (196)	(India) Goa	Lesya	April 18, 2016	Visited Panaji, Vasco da Gama, Anjuna, Divar and other places
11 (197)	(India) Bangalore	Regina	April 25, 2016	
12 (198)	(Nepal) Pokhara	Regina	May 2, 2016	Also visited Muktinath, Ranipauwa, Jomsom and other places
13 (199)	(Bangladesh) Dhaka	Lesya	May 9, 2016	Also visited Chittagong
14 (200)	(Thailand) Phuket	Lesya	May 16, 2016	Also visited Phang Nga Province, Ko Phi Phi Don and Ko Phi Phi Lee
15 (201)	(Thailand) Chiang Mai	Regina	May 23, 2016	Also visited Mae Rim, Chiang Rai and other places
16 (202)	(Indonesia) Jakarta	Lesya	May 30, 2016	
17 (203)	(China) Hainan	Regina	June 6, 2016	Visited Sanya and its surroundings
18 (204)	Macau	Lesya	June 13, 2016	Previously visited in Season 3's episode 2
19 (205)	(Philippines) Cebu	Lesya	June 20, 2016	Visited Cebu City, Oslob and other places on Cebu
20 (206)	(Japan) Hiroshima	Lesya	June 27, 2016	Also visited Miyajima
21 (207)	(Japan) Osaka	Regina	July 4, 2016	Also visited Nara (previously visited in Season 8's episode 14)
22 (208)	(Northern Mariana Islands) Saipan	Regina	July 11, 2016	Visited Garapan and its surroundings
23 (209)	Fiji	Lesya	July 18, 2016	Visited Nadi, Sigatoka, Taveuni, Malolo, Yasawa Islands and other places
24 (210)	(French Polynesia) Tahiti	Lesya	July 25, 2016	Also visited Mo'orea and Bora Bora
25 (211)	(Canada) Vancouver	Pyotr	August 1, 2016	Also visited Whistler
26 (212)	(United States) Sacramento	Regina	August 8, 2016	
27 (213)	(United States) Salt Lake City	Pyotr	August 15, 2016	Also visited Moab
28 (214)	(Mexico) Guadalajara	Pyotr	August 22, 2016	
29 (215)	(Mexico) Acapulco	Pyotr	August 29, 2016	Also visited Taxco
30 (216)	Honduras	Regina	September 5, 2016	Visited Tegucigalpa, Roatán and La Esperanza
31 (217)	(Ecuador) Guayaquil	Pyotr	September 12, 2016	Also visited Baños
32 (218)	(Peru) Iquitos	Pyotr	September 19, 2016	
33 (219)	(Chile) Atacama	Pyotr	September 26, 2016	Visited Calama, San Pedro de Atacama, El Tatio and other places in the Atacama
34 (220)	Guyana	Regina	October 3, 2016	Visited Georgetown, Kaieteur Falls and Annai
35 (221)	(Paraguay) Asunción	Pyotr	October 10, 2016	
36 (222)	(Uruguay) Montevideo	Regina	October 17, 2016	Also visited Punta del Este and Isla de Lobos
37 (223)	(Portugal) Porto	Regina	October 24, 2016	Also visited Chamusca
38 (224)	(Morocco) Fez	Pyotr	October 31, 2016	Also visited Chefchaouen
39 (225)	(Spain) Córdoba	Pyotr	November 7, 2016	Also visited Aguilar de la Frontera
40 (226)	(France) Nantes	Pyotr	November 14, 2016	Also visited Beauvoir-sur-Mer

=== Season 13 ===
In this season, Paradise and Hell, regions with good and bad conditions are visited.

Episode #	Location	Gold card holder	First aired	Comments
1 (227)	Thailand	Regina	February 12, 2017	Visited Pattaya (previously visited in Season 1's episode 12), Ko Lan (previously visited in Season 1's episode 12), Ko Kut and Ko Chang
2 (228)	Indonesia	Lesya	February 19, 2017	Visited Medan, Sinabung, Samosir and other places on Sumatra, and Surabaya, Ijen and other places on Java
3 (229)	(Kenya) Mombasa	Regina	February 26, 2017	Also visited Diani Beach and Amboseli National Park
4 (230)	Vietnam	Lesya	March 5, 2017	Visited Nha Trang, Phu Quoc and other small places
5 (231)	(India) Kolkata	Regina	March 12, 2017	Also visited Gosaba and other places in West Bengal
6 (232)	Cambodia	Regina	March 19, 2017	Visited Sihanoukville, Bokor National Park, Angkor Wat (previously visited in Season 1's episode 11) and other places
7 (233)	Jamaica	Regina	March 26, 2017	Previously visited in Season 3's episode 3; visited Montego Bay, Negril, Falmouth, and other places
8 (234)	(Honduras) San Pedro Sula	Regina	April 2, 2017	Previously visited full country in Season 12's episode 30; also visited Taulabé and Copán Ruinas
9 (235)	Curaçao	Lesya	April 9, 2017	Visited Willemstad, Westpunt and other places on Curaçao; also visited Oranjestad on Aruba
10 (236)	(The Bahamas) Bahamas	Regina	April 16, 2017	Visited Nassau on New Providence, Paradise Island, Bimini, Exuma, Long Island and other islands
11 (237)	(Venezuela) Caracas	Lesya	April 23, 2017	Also visited Canaima National Park
12 (238)	(New Zealand) Queenstown	Lesya	April 30, 2017	Also visited Glenorchy and other places and mountains in the surroundings of Queenstown
13 (239)	New Caledonia	Regina	May 7, 2017	Visited Numea, Bourail and other places and islands
14 (240)	Solomon Islands	Lesya	May 14, 2017	Visited Honiara and others places on Guadalcanal, Malaita, Lola Island and other islands
15 (241)	(Australia) Queensland	Lesya	May 21, 2017	Visited Brisbane, Gold Coast and Cairns. This episode so no meeting between the two hosts at the end
16 (242)	Switzerland	Lesya	May 28, 2017	Visited Geneva, Dully, Lavey-les-Bains, Täsch, Zermatt and Gruyères
17 (243)	(Nigeria) Lagos	Lesya	June 4, 2017	
18 (244)	Tunisia	Regina	June 11, 2017	Visited Tunis, Hammamet, Chebika, Tozeur and Tataouine
19 (245)	Ghana	Regina	June 18, 2017	Also visited Elmina, Tamale and Gabaga
20 (246)	(Greece) Corfu	Lesya	June 25, 2017	Visited Corfu, Pontikonisi, Mount Pantokrator and other places

=== Season 14 ===
In this season, titled Reboot, the hosts visited cities that have already been covered by the show.

Episode #	Location	Gold card holder	First aired	Comments
1 (247)	Hong Kong	Anton	March 14, 2017	Previously visited in Season 3's episode 2
2 (248)	Sri Lanka	Anton	March 21, 2017	Previously visited in Season 3's episode 13; visited Colombo, Kotagala, Dalhousie, Dambulla and other places
3 (249)	(Thailand) Bangkok	Nastya	March 28, 2017	Previously visited in Season 1's episode 12
4 (250)	(Nepal) Kathmandu	Anton	April 4, 2017	Previously visited in Season 2's episode 11; also visited Sankhu
5 (251)	Singapore	Nastya	April 11, 2017	Previously visited in Season 3's episode 12
6 (252)	(Brazil) Rio de Janeiro	Anton	April 18, 2017	Previously visited in Season 3's episode 7
7 (253)	(Ecuador) Quito	Nastya	April 25, 2017	Previously visited in Season 5's episode 7; also visited Galápagos Islands, Quilotoa, Cotopaxi and other places
8 (254)	Mexico City	Nastya	May 2, 2017	Previously visited in Season 2's episode 1; also visited Tepoztlán, Pachuca, Veracruz and other small places
9 (255)	(Mexico) Cancún	Anton	May 9, 2017	Previously visited in Season 2's episode 4; also visited Isla Mujeres, Chichen Itza, Coba and Mérida
10 (256)	(Cuba) Havana	Anton	May 16, 2017	Previously visited in Season 2's episode 2; also visited Varadero
11 (257)	(United States) Miami	Anton	May 23, 2017	Previously visited in Season 3's episode 4; also visited Miami Beach and Key West
12 (258)	(United States) Las Vegas	Anton	May 30, 2017	Previously visited in Season 1's episode 2; also visited Death Valley National Park
13 (259)	(United States) Los Angeles	Nastya	June 6, 2017	Previously visited in Season 1's episode 4; also visited Pasadena, Burbank and Valencia
14 (260)	(United States) San Francisco	Anton	June 13, 2017	Previously visited in Season 1's episode 3; also visited Mountain View
15 (261)	(United States) Chicago	Nastya	June 20, 2017	Previously visited in Season 2's episode 13
16 (262)	(Netherlands) Amsterdam	Anton	June 27, 2017	Previously visited in Season 2's episode 3; also visited Hillegom and Keukenhof
17 (263)	(Germany) Berlin	Nastya	July 4, 2017	Previously visited in Season 2's episode 8
18 (264)	(France) Paris	Nastya	July 11, 2017	Previously visited in Season 2's episode 6
19 (265)	(Czech Republic) Prague	Anton	July 18, 2017	Previously visited in Season 5's episode 3; also visited Karlovy Vary and Milovice
20 (266)	(Austria) Vienna	Nastya	July 25, 2017	Previously visited in Season 5's episode 2
21 (267)	(Turkey) Istanbul	Anton	August 15, 2017	Previously visited in Season 2's episode 7; also visited Bursa
22 (268)	(Kazakhstan) Astana	Nastya	August 22, 2017	Previously visited in Season 7's episode 16; also visited Borovoe
23 (269)	(India) Mumbai	Nastya	September 12, 2017	Previously visited in Season 2's episode 12
24 (270)	(Japan) Tokyo	Nastya	September 12, 2017	Previously visited in Season 8's episode 13; also visited Chiba and Nagoya
25 (271)	(China) Shanghai	Nastya	September 19, 2017	Previously visited in Season 4's episode 15
26 (272)	(South Korea) Seoul	Anton	September 19, 2017	Previously visited in Season 4's episode 17; also visited Suwon
27 (273)	(China) Beijing	Nastya	September 26, 2017	Previously visited in Season 2's episode 1
28 (274)	(Vietnam) Ho Chi Minh City	Anton	October 3, 2017	Previously visited in Season 1's episode 13; also visited Da Lat and its surroundings
29 (275)	(Scotland) Edinburgh	Anton	October 10, 2017	Previously visited in Season 4's episode 2; also visited Bridge of Allan
30 (276)	(Republic of Ireland) Ireland	Nastya	October 16, 2017	Previously visited in Season 8's episode 23; visited Dublin, Clare Island, Glendalough and other small places
31 (277)	(United Kingdom) London	Anton	October 23, 2017	Previously visited in Season 4's episode 5
32 (278)	(Spain) Barcelona	Anton	October 30, 2017	Previously visited in Season 1's episode 4
33 (279)	(Spain) Ibiza	Nastya	November 6, 2017	Previously visited in Season 6's episode 8; visited San Antonio, Illa de Tagomago, Sant Josep de sa Talaia and other places
34 (280)	(Spain) Madrid	Anton	November 13, 2017	Previously visited in Season 1's episode 9; also visited Toledo and Consuegra
35 (281)	(Italy) Rome	Anton	November 20, 2017	Previously visited in Season 1's episode 8; also visited The Vatican
36 (282)	(Italy) Venice	Nastya	November 27, 2017	Previously visited in Season 1's episode 10 and in Season 5's episode 5
37 (283)	Israel	Nastya	December 4, 2017	Previously visited in Season 1's episode 7; visited Tel Aviv, Jerusalem, Netanya and other places
38 (284)	Canary Islands	Anton	December 11, 2017	Previously visited in Season 4's episode 13; visited La Orotava, Teide National Park and other places on Tenerife and Lanzarote
39 (285)	(South Africa) Cape Town	Anton	December 18, 2017	Previously visited in Season 4's episode 7; also visited Hermanus and Franschhoek
40 (286)	(Tanzania) Zanzibar	Anton	December 25, 2017	Previously visited in Season 8's episode 3; visited Stone Town, Pemba Island, Fumba and other places

=== Season 15 ===
This season, titled Paradise and Hell 2, continues the previous format with each city is divided into paradise and hell.

Episode #	Location	Gold card holder	First aired	Comments
1 (287)	(Italy) Sardinia	Regina	September 11, 2017	Visited Cagliari, Porto Cervo, Gonnesa, San Sperate and other places
2 (288)	(Croatia) Split	Natalie	September 18, 2017	Also visited Hvar, Kaštela, Brač, Krka National Park, Žrnovnica and Zadar
3 (289)	(Germany) Hamburg	Regina	September 11, 2017	Also visited Cuxhaven
4 (290)	Sweden	Natalie	September 18, 2017	Visited Gothenburg, Helsingborg, Malmö, Mölle and other places
5 (291)	Portugal	Regina	September 25, 2017	Visited Sintra, Faro, Vilamoura and other places
6 (292)	(France) Provence	Natalie	October 2, 2017	Visited Marseille, Avignon, Sault, Roussillon and other places
7 (293)	(India) Kerala	Regina	October 9, 2017	Visited Kochi, Alappuzha, Aranmula, Thrissur and other places
8 (294)	(Myanmar) Yangon	Regina	October 16, 2017	
9 (295)	(South Korea) Busan	Natalie	October 23, 2017	Also visited Jeju Island
10 (296)	(Taiwan) Kaohsiung	Regina	October 30, 2017	Also visited Sandimen and Kenting National Park
11 (297)	(Qatar) Doha	Natalie	November 6, 2017	
12 (298)	(Brazil) Fortaleza	Regina	November 13, 2017	Also visited Jericoacoara National Park and Canoa Quebrada
13 (299)	(Mexico) Guanajuato	Natalie	November 20, 2017	Visited Guanajuato City, San Miguel de Allende and other places
14 (300)	(El Salvador) San Salvador	Natalie	November 27, 2017	Also visited Santa Ana, La Libertad and other locations
15 (301)	Barbados	Natalie	December 4, 2017	Visited Bridgetown, Oistins, Bathsheba and other locations

=== Stars ===
This season is titled Stars, a special season with commonly recognizable figures in show business.

Episode #	Location	Gold card holder	First aired	Comments
1 (302)	(South Africa) Durban	Kolya Serga, Ekaterina Varnava	December 14, 2017	
2 (303)	(Portugal) Lisbon	Mikhail Bashkatov, Masha Ivakova	December 18, 2017	Previously visited in Season 4's episode 14
3 (304)	(Italy) Genova	Zhanna Badoeva, Victor Vasiliev	December 19, 2017	Also visited Alba and Portofino
4 (305)	Luxembourg	Alan Badoev, Anfisa Chekhova	December 21, 2017	Visites Luxembourg City, Beaufort and other places
5 (306)	(Hungary) Budapest	Alexander Revva, Svetlana Loboda	December 25, 2017	Previously visited in Season 10's episode 13

=== Season 16 ===
This season is titled Reboot: America, and continues previous format, but only in the Americas.

Episode #	Location	Gold card holder	First aired	Comments
1 (307)	(Argentina) Ushuaia	Nastya	February 4, 2018	Previously visited in Season 8's episode 27; also visited Tierra del Fuego National Park and other locations
2 (308)	(Chile) Santiago	Nastya	February 11, 2018	Previously visited in Season 3's episode 8; also visited Valparaíso
3 (309)	(Argentina) Buenos Aires	Nastya	February 18, 2018	Previously visited in Season 3's episode 11; also visited Valdes Peninsula and Capilla del Señor
4 (310)	(Brazil) São Paulo	Anton	February 25, 2018	Previously visited in Season 3's episode 9; also visited São Vicente
5 (311)	Bolivia	Nastya	March 4, 2018	Previously visited in Season 5's episode 6; visited La Paz, El Alto, Uyuni and other places
6 (312)	(United States) Hawaii	Nastya	March 11, 2018	Previously visited in Season 8's episode 17; visited Honolulu, Kauai and other places
7 (313)	(United States) Arizona	Anton	March 18, 2018	Previously visited in Season 10's episode 15; visited Phoenix and other places
8 (314)	(United States) Orlando	Nastya	March 25, 2018	Previously visited in Season 11's episode 1
9 (315)	(United States) Dallas	Nastya	April 1, 2018	Previously visited in Season 2's episode 15
10 (316)	(United States) New Orleans	Anton	April 8, 2018	Previously visited in Season 2's episode 14
11 (317)	(Dominican Republic) Dominicana	Nastya	April 15, 2018	Previously visited in Season 10's episode 9; visited Punta Cana, Pedernales and others places; also visited Anse-à-Pitres in Haiti
12 (318)	Jamaica	Anton	April 22, 2018	Previously visited in Season 3's episode 3 and in season 13's episode 7; visited Negril, Montego Bay, White House and others places
13 (319)	Nicaragua	Nastya	April 29, 2018	Previously visited in Season 3's episode 5; visited Managua, León, Granada, Masaya and others places
14 (320)	Costa Rica	Anton	May 6, 2018	Previously visited in Season 5's episode 8; visited Palmar Sur, Alajuela, Cahuita and others places
15 (321)	(Peru) Cusco	Nastya	May 13, 2018	Previously visited in Season 3's episode 10
16 (322)	(United States) San Diego	Anton	May 20, 2018	Previously visited in Season 10's episode 16
17 (323)	(United States) Utah	Nastya	May 27, 2018	Previously visited in Season 12's episode 27; visited Moab and others places
18 (324)	(United States) Seattle	Anton	June 3, 2018	Previously visited in Season 10's episode 14; also visited Olympic National Park
19 (325)	(United States) Washington	Anton	June 10, 2018	Previously visited in Season 10's episode 12
20 (326)	(United States) New York City	Anton	June 17, 2018	Previously visited in Season 1's episode 1 and in season 11's episode 20; also visited Bay Shore

=== Season 17 ===
This season is titled Sea Season, in which coastal locations are featured.

Episode #	Location	Gold card holder	First aired	Comments
1 (327)	(Egypt) Hurghada	Masha	March 12, 2018	Also visited Luxor and other places
2 (328)	(Philippines) Palawan	Masha	March 19, 2018	Visited Puerto Princesa and other places
3 (329)	(Indonesia) Flores	Masha	March 26, 2018	Visited Komodo National Park and other places
4 (330)	(Vietnam) Da Nang	Kolya	April 2, 2018	
5 (331)	(Oman) Salalah	Masha	April 9, 2018	
6 (332)	Panama	Kolya	April 16, 2018	Previously visited in Season 8's episode 25; Visited Panama City, Bocas Town and other places
6 (332)	(Mexico) Playa del Carmen	Kolya	April 23, 2018	Visited Cozumel
8 (334)	(Brazil) Salvador	Kolya	April 30, 2018	
9 (335)	(Chile) Viña del Mar	Masha	May 7, 2018	
10 (336)	(Indonesia) Bali	Kolya	May 14, 2018	Previously visited in Season 4's episode 16
11 (337)	Western Australia	Masha	May 21, 2018	Visited Perth
12 (338)	Northern Australia	Kolya	May 28, 2018	Visited Darwin; Kakadu National Park;
13 (339)	South Australia	Kolya	June 4, 2018	Visited Adelaida; Kangaroo Island
14 (340)	Cook Islands	Masha	June 11, 2018	
15 (341)	New Zealand	Kolya	June 18, 2018	Visited Wellington; and all North Island
16 (342)	(Georgia (country)) Batumi	Kolya	June 25, 2018	Previously visited in Season 2's episode 5
17 (343)	(Turkey) Marmaris	Kolya	July 2, 2018	
18 (344)	(Italy) Apulia	Masha	July 9, 2018	Visited Bari; Matera; Alberobello
19 (345)	(France) La Rochelle	Masha	July 16, 2018	
20 (346)	Cyprus	Kolya	July 23, 2018	

=== Across the Seas ===
Episode #	Location	Gold card holder	First aired	Comments
1 (347)	Maldives	Kolya	July 31, 2018	Previously visited in Season 8's Episode 1
2 (348)	(India) Chennai	Kolya	August 7, 2018	
3 (349)	(Malaysia) Penang	Kolya	August 7, 2018	
4 (350)	(Thailand) Samui	Klava	August 13, 2018	

=== Season 18 ===
This season is titled Sea Season 2 and continues the previous format.

Episode #	Location	Gold card holder	First aired	Comments
1 (351)	Bulgaria	Kolya	August 19, 2018	Visited Varna; Golden Sands; Sunny Beach
2 (352)	(Croatia) Pula	Alina	August 26, 2018	
3 (353)	Montenegro	Kolya	September 2, 2018	Visited Kotor; Budva; Perast; Lake Skadar; Tara River Canyon
4 (354)	(China) Sanya	Alina	September 9, 2018	
5 (355)	Slovenia	Alina	September 16, 2018	Visited Ljubljana; Piran; Lake Bled
6 (356)	(Malaysia) Sandakan	Alina	September 23, 2018	Also visited Kota Kinabalu
7 (357)	(Indonesia) Yogyakarta	Alina	September 30, 2018	
8 (358)	(Malaysia) Kuala Lumpur	Kolya	October 7, 2018	Previously visited in Season 3's episode 14
9 (359)	(Latvia) Jurmala	Alina	October 14, 2018	Also visited Sigulda
10 (360)	(Netherlands) Zeeland	Kolya	October 21, 2018	Visited Middelburg
11 (361)	(Greece) Mykonos	Kolya	October 28, 2018	Also visited the island of Delos
12 (362)	(Spain) Gran Canaria	Kolya	November 4, 2018	Visited Las Palmas de Gran Canaria and other places
13 (363)	(Spain) Costa del Sol	Kolya	November 11, 2018	Visited Málaga; Marbella; Ronda; Ceuta
14 (364)	(Spain) Mallorca	Alina	November 18, 2018	Visited Palma de Mallorca and other places
15 (365)	(Italy) Amalfi Coast	Alina	November 25, 2018	Visited Amalfi; Positano; Sorrento and other places
16 (366)	(Spain) Galicia	Kolya	December 2, 2018	Visited Corunna; Cape Finisterre and other places
17 (367)	(Mexico) Mexican California	Alina	December 9, 2018	Visited Cabo San Lucas
18 (368)	(Mexico) Puerto Vallarta	Kolya	December 16, 2018	
19 (369)	(United States) Florida	Alina	December 23, 2018	Visited Tampa; St. Petersburg; Sarasota and other places
20 (370)	(United States) Key West	Kolya	December 30, 2018	Also visited Key Largo

=== Season 19 ===
This season is called Reboot 3 and continues previous format.

Episode #	Location	Gold card holder	First aired	Comments
1 (371)	Jordan	Nastya	August 19, 2018	Previously visited in Season 1's episode 6; Visited Amman, Wadi Rum
2 (372)	Tajikistan	Nastya	August 26, 2018	Previously visited in Season 7's episode 14; Visited Dushanbe, Nurak,
3 (373)	(Lebanon) Beirut	Nastya	September 2, 2018	Previously visited in Season 3's episode 6; Also visited Jeita Grotto, Baalbek
4 (374)	Greece	Nastya	September 9, 2018	Visited Athens, Cephalonia
5 (375)	(Turkey) Antalya	Anton	September 16, 2018	Previously visited in Season 6's episode 2; Also visited Cappadocia, Alanya
6 (376)	(France) (Monaco) French Riviera	Nastya	September 23, 2018	Previously visited in Season 4's episode 11; Visited Nice, Monaco, Vichy
7 (377)	(Sweden) Stockholm	Evsey	September 30, 2018	Previously visited in Season 2's episode 16
8 (378)	(India) Varanasi	Evsey	October 7, 2018	Previously visited in Season 10's episode 3; Also visited Sarnath
9 (379)	(Georgia (country)) Tbilisi	Nastya	October 14, 2018	Previously visited in Season 1's episode 15; Also visited Signagi
10 (380)	(Armenia) Yerevan	Evsey	October 21, 2018	Previously visited in Season 7's episode 12; Also visited Lake Sevan; Garni
11 (381)	Mongolia	Evsey	October 28, 2018	Previously visited in Season 8's episode 16; Visited Ulaanbaatar; Gobi Desert
12 (382)	(China) Guangzhou	Nastya	November 4, 2018	Previously visited in Season 10's episode 2
13 (383)	(Uzbekistan) Tashkent	Evsey	November 11, 2018	Visited Samarkand
14 (384)	(Azerbaijan) Baku	Nastya	November 18, 2018	Previously visited in Season 1's episode 14 and in Season 7's episode 17
15 (385)	Tunisia	Evsey	November 25, 2018	Previously visited in Season 13's episode 18; Visited Tunis; Djerba; Kerkennah Islands; Monastir
16 (386)	(Italy) Sicily	Nastya	December 2, 2018	Visited Catania; Taormina; Stromboli
17 (387)	Malta	Evsey	December 9, 2018	Previously visited in Season 6's episode 5; Visited Valletta; Senglea; Cospicua; Birgu
18 (388)	Madagascar	Nastya	December 16, 2018	Previously visited in Season 4's episode 10; Visited Morondava; Tsingy de Bemaraha Strict Nature Reserve
19 (389)	Mauritius	Nastya	December 23, 2018	Previously visited in Season 8's episode 24
20 (390)	Seychelles	Nastya	December 30, 2018	Previously visited in Season 8's episode 4

=== Season 20 ===
This season is called Sea Season 3 and it continues the previous format.

Episode #	Location	Gold card holder	First aired	Comments
1 (391)	Maldives	Alina	February 4, 2019	Previously visited in Season 8's episode 1; Visited Malé
2 (392)	Singapore	Alina	February 11, 2019	Previously visited in Season 3's episode 12 and in Season 14's episode 5
3 (393)	Sri Lanka	Kolya	February 18, 2019	Previously visited in Season 3's episode 13 and in Season 14's episode 2; Visited Galle, Yala National Park
4 (394)	Thailand	Kolya	February 25, 2019	Previously visited in Season 13's episode 1; Visited Phuket, Krabi
5 (395)	(Brazil) Recife	Kolya	March 4, 2019	Also visited Fernando de Noronha
6 (396)	(Peru) Paracas	Kolya	March 11, 2019	
7 (397)	(Brazil) Santa Catarina	Kolya	March 18, 2019	Visited Florianópolis
8 (398)	(Mexico) (Belize) Costa Maya	Alina	March 25, 2019	Visited Chetumal, Mahahual, Great Blue Hole in Belize
9 (399)	(United Arab Emirates) Abu Dhabi	Alina	April 1, 2019	Previously visited in Season 6's episode 1; Also visited Sir Bani Yas, Al Ain
10 (400)	(Philippines) Boracay	Alina	April 8, 2019	Also visited Manila, Mindoro, Panay
11 (401)	(India) Goa	Alina	April 15, 2019	Previously visited in Season 12's episode 10
12 (402)	(Philippines) Bohol	Kolya	April 22, 2019	Also visited Panglao Island
13 (403)	(Dominican Republic) Dominicana	Kolya	April 29, 2019	Previously visited in Season 10's episode 9 and in Season 16's episode 11
14 (404)	Antigua and Barbuda	Kolya	May 6, 2019	
15 (405)	Saint Kitts and Nevis	Alina	May 13, 2019	
16 (406)	(United States) US Virgin Islands	Kolya	May 20, 2019	
17 (407)	(Portugal) Azores	Alina	May 27, 2019	Previously visited in Season 9's episode 13;
18 (408)	(Turkey) Alanya	Alina	June 3, 2019	
19 (409)	(Greece) Rhodes	Alina	June 10, 2019	
20 (410)	(Turkey) İzmir	Alina	June 17, 2019	

=== Season 21 ===
This season, titled Megapolises, is about the largest cities of our planet.

Episode #	Location	Gold card holder	First aired	Comments
1 (411)	Macau	Olga	February 4, 2019	Previously visited in Season 12's episode 18;
2 (412)	(Vietnam) Hanoi	Anton	February 11, 2019	Previously visited in Season 8's episode 7; Also visited Hạ Long Bay
3 (413)	(Thailand) Bangkok	Olga	February 18, 2019	Previously visited in Season 1's episode 12 and in Season 14's episode 3;
4 (414)	(Germany) Berlin	Olga	February 25, 2019	Previously visited in Season 2's episode 8 and in Season 14's episode 17;
5 (415)	(Tanzania) Dar es Salaam	Olga	March 4, 2019	Previously visited in Season 8's episode 3;
6 (416)	(South Africa) Cape Town	Anton	March 11, 2019	Previously visited in Season 4's episode 7 and in Season 14's episode 39;
7 (417)	(Namibia) Windhoek	Olga	March 18, 2019	Previously visited in Season 12's episode 4; Also visited Walvis Bay, Swakopmund
8 (418)	(South Korea) Seoul	Anton	March 25, 2019	Previously visited in Season 4's episode 17 and in Season 14's episode 26;
9 (419)	(Indonesia) Jakarta	Olga	April 1, 2019	Previously visited in Season 12's episode 16;
10 (420)	(Thailand) Pattaya	Anton	April 8, 2019	Previously visited in Season 13's episode 1;
11 (421)	Hong Kong	Anton	April 15, 2019	Previously visited in Season 3's episode 2 and in Season 14's episode 1;
12 (422)	(Brazil) Rio de Janeiro	Olga	April 22, 2019	Previously visited in Season 3's episode 7 and in Season 14's episode 6;
13 (423)	(Peru) Lima	Olga	April 29, 2019	Previously visited in Season 11's episode 18;
14 (424)	(Cuba) Havana	Anton	May 6, 2019	Previously visited in Season 2's episode 2 and in Season 14's episode 10;
15 (425)	Mexico City	Anton	May 13, 2019	Previously visited in Season 2's episode 1 and in Season 14's episode 8;
16 (426)	(England) London	Olga	May 20, 2019	Previously visited in Season 4's episode 5 and in Season 14's episode 31;
17 (427)	(Turkey) Istanbul	Anton	May 27, 2019	Previously visited in Season 2's episode 7 and in Season 14's episode 21;
18 (428)	(Netherlands) Amsterdam	Olga	June 3, 2019	Previously visited in Season 2's episode 3 and in Season 14's episode 16;
19 (429)	(France) Paris	Anton	June 10, 2019	Previously visited in Season 2's episode 6 and in Season 14's episode 18;
20 (430)	(India) Delhi	Olga	June 17, 2019	Previously visited in Season 10's episode 1;

=== Season 22 ===
This season is titled Wonders of the World, this season focuses on showing particularly interesting locations.

==== Part 1 ====
Episode #	Location	Gold card holder	First aired	Comments
1 (431)	Great Wall of China	Anton	September 1, 2019	Also visited Beijing, Qinhuangdao;
2 (432)	(China) The Mountains Of Guilin	Alina	September 8, 2019	
3 (433)	(Jordan) Petra	Alina	September 15, 2019	
4 (434)	(Italy) Dolomites	Alina	September 22, 2019	Visited Bolzano
5 (435)	(France) The Castles Of The Loire	Alina	September 29, 2019	Visited Tours, Amboise
6 (436)	(Norway) Norwegian fjords	Anton	October 6, 2019	Visited Bergen, Stavanger, Flåm Line
7 (437)	(China) Mountain Avatar	Alina	October 13, 2019	
8 (438)	(Japan) Mount Fuji	Anton	October 20, 2019	Visited Tokyo
9 (439)	(Indonesia) Volcanoes Of Java	Alina	October 27, 2019	
10–11 (440–441)	(Indonesia) New Guinea	Alina	November 3 and 10, 2019	
12 (442)	(China) Big Panda	Anton	November 17, 2019	Visited Chengdu
13 (443)	(Brazil) Amazon jungle	Anton	November 24, 2019	Visited Manaus
14 (444)	(Argentina) (Brazil) (Paraguay) Iguazu Falls	Anton	December 1, 2019	
15 (445)	(Peru) Lake Titicaca	Alina	December 15, 2019	
16 (446)	Day of the Dead. Mexico	Anton	December 22, 2019	Visited Morelia, Mexico City
17 (447)	Pyramids Maya. Mexico	Anton	December 29, 2019	Visited Cancun, Playa del Carmen
18 (448)	(Australia) Great Barrier Reef	Alina	January 5, 2020	
19 (449)	(Australia) Australian desert	Anton	January 12, 2020	
20 (450)	Cambodia Tempes	Alina	January 19, 2020	

==== Part 2 ====
Episode #	Location	Gold card holder	First aired	Comments
1 (451)	(Tunisia) Sahara Desert	Anton	March 1, 2020	
2 (452)	(Benin) West African Vodun	Anton	March 8, 2020	Also visited Cotonou, Ouidah
3 (453)	Afar Triangle. Ethiopia	Alina	March 15, 2020	Also visited Mekelle, Danakil Desert
4 (454)	Kilimanjaro. Tanzania	Anton	March 22, 2020	Also visited Moshi
5 (455)	Dead Sea. Israel	Anton	March 29, 2020	
6 (456)	Islands of Thailand	Alina	April 5, 2020	Also visited Samui, Ko Mat Sum
7–8 (457–458)	Aurora Borealis. Norway	Alina	April 12 and 19, 2020	Also visited Tromsø
9 (459)	Mont Blanc. France	Alina	April 26, 2020	Also visited Chamonix
10 (460)	Battle of the Oranges. Italy	Alina	May 3, 2020	Also visited Turin, Ivrea
11 (461)	Holi. India	Anton	May 10, 2020	Also visited Mathura, Delhi
12 (462)	Taj Mahal. India	Alina	May 17, 2020	Also visited Agra

==== Part 3 ====
Episode #	Location	Gold card holder	First aired	Comments
1 (463)	(Turkey) Cappadocia	Anton	September 26, 2020	Also visited Uçhisar, Göreme, Derinkuyu, Ürgüp
2 (464)	(Turkey) Mount Ararat	Vasilisa	October 3, 2020	Also visited Doğubayazıt, Demirtepe, Çevirme, Lake Van
3 (465)	(Turkey) Pamukkale	Anton	October 3, 2020	Also visited Bodrum, Hierapolis
4 (466)	Bosporus. Turkey	Vasilisa	October 10, 2020	Also visited Istanbul, Sarayburnu, Keçilik Koyu, Eminönü, Karaköy
5 (467)	Plitvice Lakes. Croatia	Vasilisa	October 10, 2020	Also visited Zadar, Zagreb, Šibenik, Maslenica
6 (468)	Copper Canyon. Mexico	Vasilisa	October 17, 2020	Also visited Chihuahua, Pito Real
7 (469)	Wells Maya. Mexico	Anton	October 24, 2020	Also visited Yucatán Peninsula, Francisco Uh-May, Tulum, Isla Contoy
8 (470)	(Dominican Republic) Beaches of Dominicana	Vasilisa	October 31, 2020	Also visited Punta Cana, Samaná Península, Rio Los Cocos Waterfalls, Otra Banda, Isla Catalina
9 (471)	(Greece) Olympus and Meteora	Vasilisa	November 7, 2020	Also visited Thessaloniki, Litohoro, Aegean Sea, Skopelos
10 (472)	Santorini. Greece	Vasilisa	November 14, 2020	Also visited Thera, Oia, Nea Kameni, Palea Kameni, Perissa
11 (473)	(France) Mont-Saint-Michel	Anton	November 21, 2020	Also visited Pontorson, Beauvoir, Cancale, Moidre, Saint-Malo
12 (474)	West Kazakhstan	Anton	December 5, 2020	Also visited Aktau, Caspian Sea, Senek, Ustyurt Plateau, Sherkala
13 (475)	(Portugal) Madeira Island	Anton	December 12, 2020	Also visited Funchal
14 (476)	(Germany) Castle Cinderella (Neuschwanstein)	Anton	December 19, 2020	Also visited München, Hohenschwangau, Nördlingen, Füssen
15 (477)	Victoria Falls. Zambia	Vasilisa	December 26, 2020	Also visited Livingstone, River Zambezi
16 (478)	South Kazakhstan	Anton	January 2, 2021	Also visited Trans-Ili Alatau, Almaty, Charyn Canyon, Charyn River, Saty, Kolsai Lake
17 (479)	Rhine Valley. Germany	Vasilisa	January 9, 2021	Also visited Rüdesheim, Assmannshausen, Rheinfels Castle, Schönburg Castle, Stahleck Castle, Rheinstein Castle, Marksburg Castle, Katz Castle, Maus Castle, Cologne, Cologne Cathedral
18 (480)	Lake Victoria. Uganda	Anton	January 16, 2021	Also visited Entebbe, Kimi Island, Casegna, Kampala, Jinja
19 (481)	Tribes of Ethiopia	Anton	January 30, 2021	Also visited Arba Minch, Karo Korcho, Chencha, Alduba, Dorze, Hamer, Mursi, Chamo Lake
20 (482)	Big African Five. Kenya	Anton	February 6, 2021	Also visited Great Rift Valley, Mount Kenya, Samburu National Reserve, Nairobi, Samburu, Kibera, Reteti Trails

==== Part 4 ====
Episode #	Location	Gold card holder	First aired	Comments
1 (483)	(Ecuador) Volcano Road	Anton	February 27, 2021	Also visited Quito, Chimborazo
2 (484)	(Brazil) White Desert	Anton	March 6, 2021	Also visited Barreirinhas, Lençóis Maranhenses, Atins, Preguiças River
3 (485)	(Brazil) Pantanal	Vasilisa	March 13, 2021	Also visited Bonito
4 (486)	(Mexico) Earth Indians	Anton	March 20, 2021	Also visited San Cristóbal de las Casas, Palenque, Chiapa de Corzo, San Juan Chamula
5 (487)	(Mexico) Monterrey Summit	Vasilisa	March 27, 2021	Also visited Monterrey, Cerro de la Silla, Cerro de las Mitras, Cerro del Topo Chico, La Cuevо de Los Murcielagos, Rompepicos
6 (488)	(United States) (Mexico) Chihuahuan Desert	Vasilisa	April 3, 2021	Also visited El Paso, Ciudad Juárez, Chamical Park, Scenic Drive Park, Lajitas, Samalayuca Dune Fields, Terlingua
7 (489)	(Colombia) Chicamocha Canyon	Vasilisa	April 10, 2021	Also visited Bucaramanga, San Gil, Barichara, Juan Curi Waterfalls
8 (490)	Volcanoes of Costa Rica	Anton	April 17, 2021	Also visited Arenal Volcano, Playas del Coco, Rincón de la Vieja Volcano, Tenorio Volcano, Chato Volcano
9 (491)	(El Salvador) Route of Flowers	Vasilisa	April 17, 2021	Also visited San Salvador, Sonsonate, Apaneca, Juayua, Ataco
10 (492)	Wonders of Honduras	Vasilisa	May 1, 2021	Also visited San Pedro Sula, Roatán, Tela, Punta Sal National Park, Mesoamerican Barrier Reef System
11 (493)	Cape Verde Islands	Anton	May 15, 2021	Also visited Sal Island, Santa Maria, Monte Grande
12 (494)	Principality of Andorra	Vasilisa	May 16, 2021	Also visited Andorra la Vella, Pas de la Casa, Canillo, Os de Civís
13 (495)	(Switzerland) Matterhorn	Vasilisa	May 22, 2021	Also visited Bern, Zermatt, Spiez
14 (496)	(Spain) The Way of Saint James	Vasilisa	May 29, 2021	Also visited Vigo, Redondela, Vilaboa, Arcada, Cape Finisterre, Santiago de Compostela
15 (497)	(Spain) Montserrat	Vasilisa	June 5, 2021	Also visited Barcelona, Montserrat Abbey, Terrassa, Mont Rebei Ravine, Cardona
16 (498)	(Georgia (country)) Svan towers	Vasilisa	June 12, 2021	Also visited Kutaisi, Tetnuldi, Mestia, Ushguli, Chalaadi Glacier
17 (499)	(Spain) Gold of Las Médulas	Anton	June 19, 2021	Also visited León, Ponferrada, Cave of Valporquero
18 (500)	(Switzerland) Lake of Four Cantons	Anton	June 26, 2021	Also visited Lucerne, Bürgenstock, Rhine Falls
19 (501)	(Portugal) Palaces in Sintra	Vasilisa	July 3, 2021	Also visited Sintra, Sintra National Palace, Pena Palace, Cabo da Roca, Queluz, Queluz Palace, Praia das Maçãs, Arouca, Arouca National Park
20 (502)	(Portugal) Azores	Anton	July 10, 2021	Previously visited in Season 9's episode 13 and in Season 20's episode 17

==== Part 5 ====
Episode #	Location	Gold card holder	First aired	Comments
1 (503)	(Italy) Mount Vesuvius	Anfisa	August 21, 2021	Also visited Naples, Positano
2 (504)	(Greece) White Islands Cyclades	Anfisa	August 28, 2021	Also visited Paros Island, Milos Island, Adamantas, Plaka, Sarakiniko Beach, Papafragas Beach, Tsigrado Beach, Irakleia Island, Aliki, Mandrakia, Ios Island, Naxos Island, Filoti
3 (505)	(Greece) Zakynthos. Turtle Island	Anton	September 4, 2021	Also visited Zakynthos City, Laganas Beach, Laganas Bay, Cameo Island, Navagio Cove, Cephalonia, Myrtos Beach, Marathonisi Island, Dafni Beach
4 (506)	South Kyrgyzstan	Anfisa	September 11, 2021	Also visited Osh, Pamir Highway, Pamir Mountains, Alay Valley, Sulayman Mountain, Cave Tamchi Tamar, River Gulcha, Uzgen
5 (507)	(Kyrgyzstan) Heavenly Mountain. Tian Shan	Anton	September 18, 2021	Also visited Bosteri, Lake Issyk Kul, Karkyra, Khan Tengri, Jengish Chokusu, Karakol, Cholpon Ata, Altyn Arashan, Fairytale Canyon, Bishkek
6 (508)	(Namibia) Namib Desert	Anfisa	September 25, 2021	Also visited Cape Cross, Deadvlei, Swakopmund, Walvis Bay, Sandwich Harbour
7 (509)	(Tanzania) Lake Tanganyika	Anton	October 2, 2021	Also visited Kigoma, Gombe Stream National Park, Bugaga
8 (510)	(Rwanda) Mountain gorilla	Anton	October 9, 2021	Also visited Kigali, Volcanoes National Park, Rubavu, Lake Kivu
9 (511)	Seychelles Islands	Anton	October 16, 2021	Also visited Mahé Island, Victoria, Silhouette Island, Beau Vallon, Anse Intendance, Praslin Island, Vallée de Mai
10 (512)	(Mozambique) Bazaruto Archipelago	Anton	October 23, 2021	Also visited Vilankulos, Bazaruto Island, Magaruque Island, Two Mils Reef
11 (513)	(Egypt) Egyptian pyramids	Anfisa	October 30, 2021	Also visited Cairo, Saqqara, Giza, Great Pyramid of Giza, Pyramid of Khafre, Pyramid of Menkaure, Great Sphinx of Giza, Dahshur, Sahara Desert, City of the Dead, Magic Lake, Faiyum
12 (514)	(Austria) Austrian Alps	Anton	November 6, 2021	Also visited Salzburg, Großglockner, Werfen, Werfenweng
13 (515)	(Italy) Colosseum	Anton	November 13, 2021	Also visited Rome, Traiano Park, Savello Park, Vittorio Palace, Senate Palace
14 (516)	(France) Eiffel Tower	Anfisa	November 20, 2021	Also visited Paris, Seine River, Louvre, Notre Dame de Paris, Palace of Versailles, Versailles, Palais de Chaillot
15 (517)	(Spain) The Moon Island of Lanzarote	Anton	December 4, 2021	Also visited Arrecife, Timanfaya National Park, Los Charcones, Teguise
16 (518)	(France) French Riviera	Anton	December 11, 2021	Also visited Marseille, Cannes, Èze, Verdon Canyon, Aubagne, Cassis
17 (519)	(Italy) Venice	Anton	December 18, 2021	Previously visited in Season 5's episode 5, in Season 14's episode 36 and in Season 24's episode 6
18 (520)	(Spain) Sagrada Família	Anfisa	January 15, 2022	Also visited Barcelona
19 (521)	(Jordan) Wadi Rum Martian Desert	Anton	January 22, 2022	Also visited Aqaba, Red Sea, Madaba
20 (522)	(United Arab Emirates) Dubai	Anfisa	January 29, 2022	Previously visited in Season 2's episode 10 and in Season 25's episode 7

=== Season 23 ===
This season, titled Ivleeva vs Bednyakov, is about the competition of the two brightest stars of the project.

Episode #	Location	Gold card holder	First aired	Comments
1 (523)	(Italy) Milan	Andrey	September 29, 2019	Previously visited in Season 1's episode 10; Also visited Lake Como, Balestrino
2 (524)	(Hungary) Budapest	Nastya	October 6, 2019	Previously visited in Season 10's episode 13 and in season Stars episode 5; Also visited Lake Hévíz
3 (525)	(Portugal) Porto	Andrey	October 13, 2019	Previously visited in Season 12's episode 37
4 (526)	(United Kingdom) Manchester	Nastya	October 20, 2019	
5 (527)	(Switzerland) Geneva	Nastya	October 27, 2019	
6 (528)	(Romania) Bucharest	Andrey	November 3, 2019	
7 (529)	Croatia	Andrey	November 10, 2019	Also visited Split
8 (530)	(Italy) Tuscany	Andrey	November 17, 2019	Also visited Florence
9 (531)	(Italy) Sardinia	Nastya	November 24, 2019	Previously visited in Season 15's episode 1
10 (532)	(United States) New Mexico	Andrey	December 1, 2019	
11 (533)	(United States) Texas	Nastya	December 15, 2019	Also visited Austin, Houston
12 (534)	(United States) Montana	Andrey	December 22, 2019	
13 (535)	(United States) Colorado	Nastya	December 29, 2019	Also visited Denver
14 (536)	(Mexico) Jalisco	Nastya	January 5, 2020	Also visited Guadalajara, Tequila
15 (537)	(Mexico) Tijuana	Andrey	January 12, 2020	
16 (538)	(Mexico) Oaxaca	Andrey	January 19, 2020	
17 (539)	(Spain) Basque Country	Nastya	January 26, 2020	Previously visited in Season 9's episode 6
18 (540)	(Thailand) Phuket	Andrey	February 2, 2020	Previously visited in Season 12's episode 14
19 (541)	Malaysia	Andrey	February 9, 2020	Also visited Penang, Langkawi
20 (542)	Maldives	Nastya	February 16, 2020	Previously visited in Season 8's episode 1 and in Season 20's episode 1

=== Season 24 ===
That season is titled Crazy Weekend.

Episode #	Location	Gold card holder	First aired	Comments
1 (543)	(United States) Las Vegas	Yan	March 29, 2020	Previously visited in Season 1's episode 2 and in Season 14's episode 12
2 (544)	(United States) Miami	Yan	April 5, 2020	Previously visited in Season 3's episode 4 and in Season 14's episode 11
3 (545)	(United States) San Francisco	Yuliya	April 12, 2020	Previously visited in Season 1's episode 3 and in Season 14's episode 14
4 (546)	(United States) New York City	Yuliya	April 19, 2020	Previously visited in Season 1's episode 1 in Season 11's episode 20 and in Season 16's episode 20
5 (547)	(India) Rajasthan	Yuliya	April 26, 2020	Also visited Jaipur, Jodhpur
6 (548)	(Italy) Venice	Yan	May 3, 2020	Previously visited in Season 5's episode 5 and in Season 14's episode 36
7 (549)	(France) Courchevel	Yan	May 10, 2020	Also visited Moustiers-Sainte-Marie
8 (550)	(India) Andaman Islands	Yan	May 17, 2020	Also visited Port Blair, Havelock Island, South Andaman, Ross Island

=== Season 25 ===
That season is titled Girls.

Episode #	Location	Gold card holder	First aired	Comments
1 (551)	Albania	Nastya	September 26, 2020	Previously visited in Season 11's episode 7
2 (552)	North Macedonia	Yuliya	October 17, 2020	Also visited Ohrid, Skopje, Ohrid Lake, Pelister, Matka Canyon
3 (553)	Serbia	Yuliya	October 24, 2020	Also visited Belgrade
4 (554)	Montenegro	Nastya	October 31, 2020	Previously visited in Season 18's episode 3. Also visited Podgorica, Cemi River, Korita, Adriatic Sea, Lovćen
5 (555)	Tanzania	Nastya	November 7, 2020	Previously visited in Season 8's episode 3
6 (556)	(Tanzania) Zanzibar	Nastya	November 14, 2020	Previously visited in Season 14's episode 40
7 (557)	(United Arab Emirates) Dubai	Yuliya	November 21, 2020	Previously visited in Season 2's episode 10
8 (558)	(Turkey) Antalya	Nastya	December 5, 2020	Previously visited in Season 6's episode 2 and in Season 19's episode 5
9 (559)	Bosnia and Herzegovina	Yuliya	December 12, 2020	Also visited Sarajevo, Mostar
10 (560)	Cyprus	Yuliya	December 19, 2020	Previously visited in Season 17's episode 20
11 (561)	(Cyprus) Paphos	Nastya	December 26, 2020	Also visited Mediterranean Sea, Lofou, Adonis Baths, Peyia, Limni
12 (562)	Maldives	Nastya	January 2, 2021	Previously visited in Season 8's episode 1 in Season 20's episode 1 and in Season 23's episode 20
13 (563)	(Spain) Mallorca	Yuliya	January 9, 2021	Previously visited in Season 18's episode 14
14 (564)	Kazakhstan	Yuliya	January 16, 2021	Also visited Almaty, Taldykorgan
15 (565)	(Turkey) Mardin	Yuliya	January 30, 2021	Also visited Daras, Dereiçi, Nemrut Dağ, Euphrates

=== 10 Years ===
That season is titled 10 Years .

Episode #	Location	Gold card holder	First aired	Comments
1 (566)	Santa Cruz. Bolivia	Michelle Andrade & Pozitiv	February 13, 2021	Also visited Cochabamba
2 (567)	Riviera Maya. Mexico	Ekaterina Varnava & Evgeniy Borodenko	February 20, 2021	Also visited Cancún, Playa del Carmen, Cozumel Island, Tulum, Akumal
3 (568)	Undiscovered Portugal	Alexander Gudkov & Ivan Dorn	February 27, 2021	Also visited Nazaré, Mondego River, Penacova, Fátima, Coimbra, Óbidos
4 (569)	Cartagena. Colombia	Kolya Serga & Anna Sedokova	March 6, 2021	Also visited Barú Island, La Boquilla, Bay of Cartagena, El Totumo
5 (570)	Medellín. Colombia	ALEKSEEV & Yuliya Sanina (The Hardkiss)	March 13, 2021	Also visited Guatapé, El Peñón de Guatapé
6 (571)	Panama	Yan Toples & Nadya Sysoyeva	March 23, 2021	Previously visited in Season 8's episode 25 and in Season 17's episode 6
7 (572)	Costa Rica	Artik & Asti	March 27, 2021	Previously visited in Season 5's episode 8 and in Season 16's episode 14
8 (573)	Atlanta. United States	LITTLE BIG (Ilya Prusikin & Sofya Tayurskaya)	April 6, 2021	Also visited Piedmont Park, Chattahoochee River
9 (574)	Amman. Jordan	Vladimir Dantes & Nadya Dorofeyeva	April 10, 2021	Also visited Petra
10-11 (575-576)	Barcelona. Spain	Verka Serdyuchka and Inna Belokon & Vera Brezhnyeva	April 24, 2021	Previously visited in Season 1's episode 5 and in Season 14's episode 32

=== Season 26 ===
That season is titled Earthlings.

Episode	Location	Gold card holder	First aired	Comments
1 (577)	(Kenya) Kenyans	Michelle	June 5, 2021	Also visited Nairobi, Great Rift Valley, Lake Naivasha
2 (578)	(Ethiopia) Ethiopians	Kirill	June 12, 2021	Also visited Addis Ababa, Omo River, Jinka, Lalibela
3 (579)	(United Arab Emirates) Dubaians	Michelle	June 19, 2021	Also visited Dubai, Rub al Khali
4 (580)	(Lebanon) Lebanese	Michelle	June 26, 2021	Also visited Beirut, Tripoli, Baatara Waterfall, Jounieh
5 (581)	(Armenia) Armenians	Kirill	July 3, 2021	Also visited Yerevan, Gyumri
6 (582)	(Bulgaria) Bulgarians	Kirill	July 10, 2021	Also visited Sofia, Moskovets, Rila Monastery, Rila, Plovdiv
7 (583)	(Georgia (country)) Georgians	Kirill	July 17, 2021	Also visited Tbilisi, Mount Kazbek, Stepantsminda, Telavi, Tusheti, Tsinandali
8 (584)	(Turkey) Turks	Kirill	July 24, 2021	Also visited Istanbul, Kuzguncuk, Beyoğlu, Ortaköy
9 (585)	(Greece) Greeks	Kirill	July 31, 2021	Also visited Corinth Canal, Athens, Kifisia, Thessaloniki, Ouranoupolis, Mount Athos, Piraeus, Port of Piraeus, Dafni, Karyes, Pantokratoros Monastery, Mount Lycabettus
10 (586)	(Spain) Catalans	Michelle	August 7, 2021	Also visited Tarragona, Siurana, Salou
11 (587)	(Dominican Republic) Dominicans	Michelle	August 14, 2021	Also visited Santo Domingo, Boca Chica
12 (588)	(Colombia) Colombians	Kirill	August 21, 2021	Also visited Bogotá, San Andrés Island
13 (589)	(Mexico) Maya	Michelle	August 28, 2021	Also visited Mérida, Dzemul
14 (590)	(Guatemala) Guatemalans	Michelle	September 4, 2021	Also visited Guatemala City, Lake Atitlán, Volcano Cerro Quemado, Panajachel, Chichicastenango
15 (591)	(Honduras) Hondurans	Michelle	September 11, 2021	Also visited Tegucigalpa, Roatán, Punta Gorda, El Picacho Park
16 (592)	(Cyprus) Cypriots	Michelle	September 18, 2021	Also visited Limassol, Larnaca, Ayia Napa, Choirokoitia, Nicosia, Anglisides
17 (593)	(Azerbaijan) Azerbaijanis	Michelle	September 25, 2021	Also visited Baku, Balaxanı, Quba
18 (594)	(Nepal) Nepalese	Kirill	October 2, 2021	Also visited Kathmandu, Pashupatinath Temple, Patan, Bharatpur, Himalayas, Mount Everest, Lukla, Swayambhunath
19 (595)	(Pakistan) Pakistanis	Kirill	October 9, 2021	Also visited Karachi
20 (596)	(Pakistan) Pakistanis-2	Michelle	October 16, 2021	Also visited Lahore, Karakoram, Siachen Glacier, Skardu, Deosai National Park, Wagah
21 (597)	(Netherlands) Dutch	Michelle	October 23, 2021	Also visited Amsterdam, Duivenvoorde Castle, Vinkeveen, Alkmaar
22 (598)	(Slovenia) Slovenians	Michelle	October 30, 2021	Also visited Ljubljana, Selnica ob Dravi, Preddvor, Kranj, Big Pasture Plateau, Stahovica, Puconci
23 (599)	(Albania) Albanians	Michelle	November 6, 2021	Also visited Tirana, Golem, Durrës
24 (600)	(Estonia) Estonians	Kirill	November 13, 2021	Also visited Tallinn, Laitse, Lilleküla, Virtsu, Saaremaa Island, Kihnu
25 (601)	(Sweden) Swedes	Kirill	November 20, 2021	Also visited Märsta, Stockholm, Norrtälje, Lake Erken
26 (602)	(Montenegro) Montenegrins	Kirill	December 4, 2021	Also visited Bay of Kotor, Porto Montenegro, Kotor, Tivat
27 (603)	(Italy) Sicilians	Michelle	December 11, 2021	Also visited Palermo, Mount Etna
28 (604)	(United Arab Emirates) Emiratis	Kirill	December 18, 2021	Also visited Sharjah, Al Noor Island, Majlis al Midfa, Rub al Khali
29-30 (605-606)	(Yemen) Socotra residents	Kirill	December 25, 2021	Also visited Socotra Island, Hadibo, Dixam Plateau, Archer Dunes, Shoab Beach, Gulf of Aden, Homhil Plateau
31 (607)	(Moldova) Moldovans	Kirill	January 15, 2022	Also visited Chișinău, Ruseștii Noi, Butuceni, Mileștii Mici, Bulboaca

=== Season 27 ===
This season is called Earthlings, and it continues the previous format.

Episode	Location	Gold card holder	First aired	Comments
1 (608)	(Argentina) Argentines	Kirill	February 19, 2022	Also visited Buenos Aires, Lobos, Atucha, Rosario
2 (609)	(Peru) Peruvians	Michelle	February 19, 2022	Also visited Ayacucho, Andes, Sarua, Quinoa, Socos
3 (610)	(Paraguay) Paraguayans	Michelle	January 9, 2024	Also visited Asunción, Concepción, Salto Cristal Falls, Borja, Belén
4 (611)	(Brazil) Brazilians	Kirill	January 9, 2024	Also visited Rio de Janeiro
5 (612)	(Zambia) Zambians	Kirill	January 10, 2024	Also visited Lusaka, Mukuni, Ndola, Victoria Falls, Zambezi River
6 (613)	(Uganda) Ugandans	Michelle	January 11, 2024	Also visited Kampala, Kabimbiri, Murchison Falls, Busiro
7 (614)	(Mozambique) Mozambicans	Michelle	January 11, 2024	Also visited Maputo, Machangulo, Maputo Special Reserve
8 (615)	(Finland) Finns	Kirill	January 10, 2024	Also visited Helsinki, Parainen, Espoo
9 (616)	Sámi. Sweden	Michelle	January 10, 2024	Also visited Jokkmokk, Kiruna, Kalixfors, Båtskärsnäs
10 (617)	(Austria) Austrians	Michelle	January 10, 2024	Also visited Vienna, Hallstatt, Bad Ischl
11 (618)	(Tunisia) Tunisians	Kirill	January 11, 2024	Also visited Tunis, Medina of Tunis, Sidi Bou Said, Tozeur, Sahara Desert, Kairouan

=== Heads and Tails: Quarantine ===
Episode	Location	First aired
1 (1)	(Italy) Milan, (India) Goa, (United States) New York City, (Spain) Valencia, (United States) Seattle, (South Korea) Seoul, (China) Beijing, (China) Guilin	March 28, 2020
2 (2)	(Italy) Rome, (Italy) Venice, (China) Shanghai, (Italy) Milan, (England) London, (United States) Los Angeles, (United States) New York City, (Jordan) Petra, (United States) Texas, (United States) Wyoming	April 4, 2020
3 (3)	(Italy) Venice, (France) Aquitania, (United States) Los Angeles, (Saudi Arabia) Kaust, (Norway) Geiranger, (Kenya) Mombasa, (Japan) Tokyo, (Japan) Osaka, (Italy) Civitavecchia, (United Arab Emirates) Dubai, (Spain) Barcelona	April 11, 2020
4 (4)	(United States) New York City, (Indonesia) Bali, (India) Delhi, (Australia) Sydney,, Barbados, (Germany) Tübingen, (Italy) Milan, (United States) St. Augustine, (Germany) Düsseldorf, (Israel) Karmiel	April 18, 2020
5 (5)	(China) Macau, (Slovakia) Nitra, (Ecuador) Cuenca, (United States) New Orleans, (Spain) Costa del Sol, (United States) Sacramento, (United States) St. Augustine, (United States) Los Angeles, (Thailand) Phuket, (Canada) Vancouver, (Spain) Barcelona, (Spain) Alicante, (France) Paris, (Australia) Brisbane, (Canada) Toronto	April 25, 2020
6 (6)	(China) Lijiang, (Czech Republic) Prague, (Germany) Düsseldorf, (United Arab Emirates) Dubai, (Austria) Vienna, (Australia) Perth, (Netherlands) The Hague, (Netherlands) Keukenhof, (Lebanon) Beirut, (Belgium) Brussels, (China) Sanya, (Kazakhstan) Almaty, (Canary Islands) Canary, (China) Nanning	May 2, 2020
7 (7)	(Israel) Karmiel, (United States) Hawaii, (United States) Las Vegas, (New Zealand) Papamoa, (United States) Philadelphia, (Germany) Berlin, (Pakistan) Lahor, Luxembourg, (France) Paris, Monaco, (United States) Anchorage, (Spain) Barcelona, (Germany) Munich	May 9, 2020
8 (8)	(England) Manchester, (Thailand) Phuket, (Austria) Tirol, (United States) Chicago, (Indonesia) Satonda Island, (Germany) Cologne, (Germany) Düsseldorf, Singapore, (Germany) Berlin, (United States) Palo Alto, (Italy) Rome, (Italy) Milan	May 16, 2020
9 (9)	(Belarus) Minsk, (Japan) Tokyo, (South Korea) Seoul, (Kazakhstan) Pavlodar, (Spain) Atlantic Ocean, Bermuda, (Portugal) Porto, (Hungary) Budapest, (Spain) Sitio de Calahonda, (England) Windsor, Maldives, (China) Nanking, (China) Shanghai, (Canada) Edmonton	May 23, 2020

=== Oryol i Reshka. In touch ===
Episode	Location	First aired
1 (1)	Jordan, Faroe Islands, Thailand, China	June 21, 2020
2 (2)	China, United States, Japan	June 28, 2020
3 (3)	United States, Germany, Norway	July 5, 2020
4 (4)	(Indonesia) Bali, (Canada) Vancouver, Hong Kong	July 12, 2020
5 (5)	Italy, France, (Dominican Republic) Dominicana	July 19, 2020
6 (6)	Brazil, Singapore, Kazakhstan	July 26, 2020
7 (7)	(Georgia (country)) Georgia, Australia, Vietnam, (Canary Islands) Tenerife, Cyprus	August 2, 2020

=== Oryol i Reshka. Travel guide ===
Episode	Location	First aired
1 (1)	Spain	August 2, 2020
2 (2)	(United Kingdom) Great Britain	August 2, 2020
3 (3)	China	August 9, 2020
4 (4)	Thailand	August 10, 2020
5 (5)	United States	August 16, 2020
6 (6)	Italy	August 17, 2020
7 (7)	Portugal	August 23, 2020
8 (8)	India	August 24, 2020
9 (9)	France	August 31, 2020
10 (10)	Brazil	August 31, 2020
11 (11)	Mexico	September 6, 2020
12 (12)	Indonesia	September 7, 2020

=== Oryol i Reshka. Unreleased ===
Unreleased
Unreleased	Number	Episodes	First aired
Unreleased	1 (1)	(Italy) Venice, Tanzania, (Kazakhstan) Almaty, (Brazil) Rio de Janeiro, (Kenya) Nairobi, (Russia) Baikal.	August 18, 2014
Unreleased	2 (2)	(Ecuador) Quito, (Japan) Tokyo, Hong Kong, (United Arab Emirates) Abu Dhabi, (Portugal) Lisbon, (United States) Chicago, (Peru) Machu Picchu.	August 25, 2014
Unreleased	3 (3)	Iceland, (South Korea) Seoul, Mauritius, Hong Kong, (Russia) Saint Petersburg.	September 1, 2014
Anniversary season.Unreleased
Anniversary season.Unreleased	Number	Episodes	First aired
Anniversary season.Unreleased	1 (4)	(Italy) Naples, (Portugal) Azores, (India) Delhi, (Egypt) Cairo, (Morocco) Essaouira.	August 3, 2015
Anniversary season.Unreleased	2 (5)	(Bolivia) La Paz, Iceland, (India) Delhi, Guatemala, (Spain) Sevilla, (Laos) Luang Prabang.	August 10, 2015
Around the World.Unreleased
Around the World.Unreleased	Number	Episodes	First aired
Around the World.Unreleased	1 (6)	(Belgium) Antwerp, (Peru) Iquitos, (Nepal) Pokhara, (Zimbabwe) Harare.	November 21, 2016
Around the World.Unreleased	2 (7)	(Mozambique) Maputo, (Paraguay) Asunción, (French Polynesia) Tahiti, Honduras.	November 28, 2016
Around the World.Unreleased	3 (8)	(Canada) Vancouver.	December 5, 2016
Around the World.Unreleased	4 (9)	Uganda, (Oman) Muscat.	December 12, 2016
Paradise and Hell.Unreleased
Paradise and Hell.Unreleased	Number	Episodes	First aired
Paradise and Hell.Unreleased	1 (10). Paradise	Jamaica 2, Tunisia, Switzerland, (The Bahamas) Bahamas.	July 3, 2017
Paradise and Hell.Unreleased	2 (11). Hell	(Honduras) San Pedro Sula, Solomon Islands, (Ghana) Accra.	July 10, 2017
Reload.Unreleased
Reload.Unreleased	Number	Episodes	First aired
Reload.Unreleased	1 (12)	(Thailand) Bangkok 2, (France) Paris 2, (Austria) Vienna 2, (United States) Miami 2, (Netherlands) Amsterdam 2.	August 1, 2017
Reload.Unreleased	2 (13)	(Thailand) Bangkok 2, (France) Paris 2, (United States) San Francisco 2.	August 8, 2017
Reload.Unreleased	3 (14)	(Scotland) Edinburgh 2, (Spain) Barcelona 2, (Vietnam) Ho Chi Minh City 2.	January 22, 2018
Reload.Unreleased	4 (15)	(India) Mumbai 2, (South Korea) Seoul 2, (Republic of Ireland) Ireland 2, (China) Beijing 2, (Italy) Rome 2.	January 29, 2018
Paradise and Hell 2.Unreleased
Paradise and Hell 2.Unreleased	Number	Episodes	First aired
Paradise and Hell 2.Unreleased	1 (16)	Sardinia, Portugal, (South Korea) Busan, Sweden, (Brazil) Fortaleza.	January 29, 2018
Paradise and Hell 2.Unreleased	2 (17)	(Taiwan) Kaohsiung, (Germany) Hamburg, (India) Kerala, (Mexico) Guanajuato, (El Salvador) San Salvador, Barbados.	February 5, 2018
Reload America.Unreleased
Reload America.Unreleased	Number	Episodes	First aired
Reload America.Unreleased	1 (18)	(United States) Orlando 2, (United States) Hawaii.	June 25, 2018
Reload America.Unreleased	2 (19)	(United States) Arizona 2.	Jule 2, 2018
Sea Season.Unreleased
Sea Season.Unreleased	Number	Episodes	First aired
Sea Season.Unreleased	1 (20)	(Vietnam) Da Nang, South Australia, (France) La Rochelle, (Vietnam) Da Nang, (Italy) Apulia.	Jule 30, 2018
Sea Season.Unreleased	2 (21)	Cyprus, (Brazil) Salvador, Western Australia, Cook Islands, Northern Australia, (Philippines) Palawan.	August 4, 2018
Reload 3. Unreleased
Reload 3. Unreleased	Number	Episodes	First aired
Reload 3. Unreleased	1 (22)	(North Korea) Pyongyang, (India) Varanasi 2, Greece, Mongolia, Tajikistan, (Armenia) Yerevan 2 .	October 29, 2018
Reload 3. Unreleased	2 (23)	Tunisia 2, (Azerbaijan) Baku 3, Madagascar 2.	January 14, 2019
Sea Season 2. Unreleased
Sea Season 2. Unreleased	Number	Episodes	First aired
Sea Season 2. Unreleased	1 (24)	(Spain) Gran Canaria, (Spain) Gran Canaria, (Mexico) Puerto Vallarta, (Mexico) Mexican California, (China) Sanya.	January 21, 2019
Sea Season 2. Unreleased	2 (25)	(United States) Florida, (Italy) Amalfi Coast, (Croatia) Pula, (United States) Florida, (China) Sanya, (Spain) Galicia.	January 28, 2019
Megacities. Unreleased
Megacities. Unreleased	Number	Episodes	First aired
Megacities. Unreleased	1 (26)	(Thailand) Bangkok 3, (Indonesia) Jakarta 2.	June 24, 2019
Megacities. Unreleased	2 (27)	(Vietnam) Hanoi 2, (South Korea) Seoul 3, (India) Delhi 2.	July 1, 2019
Sea Season 3. Unreleased
Sea Season 3. Unreleased	Number	Episodes	First aired
Sea Season 3. Unreleased	1 (28)	Thailand 2, (India) Goa 2, (Philippines) Boracay, Maldives 3, Maldives 3.	June 24, 2019
Sea Season 3. Unreleased	2 (29)	(Philippines) Bohol, (Philippines) Bohol, (Dominican Republic) Dominicana 3, Maldives 3, (Philippines) Boracay, (Greece) Rhodes, (Portugal) Azores 2, Sri Lanka 3, (Philippines) Boracay.	July 1, 2019
Wonders of the World. Unreleased
Wonders of the World. Unreleased	Number	Episodes	First aired
Wonders of the World. Unreleased	1 (30)	(Peru) Lake Titicaca.	February 17, 2020
Wonders of the World. Unreleased	2 (31)	(China) Mountain Avatar, (Brazil) Amazon jungle.	March 1, 2020
Ivleeva vs Bednyakov. Unreleased
Ivleeva vs Bednyakov. Unreleased	Number	Episodes	First aired
Ivleeva vs Bednyakov. Unreleased	1 (32)	(Italy) Milan 2, (United States) Montana, (Romania) Bucharest, (Portugal) Porto 2, (Italy) Milan 2, (Italy) Sardinia 2, (United States) Colorado.	March 16, 2020
Ivleeva vs Bednyakov. Unreleased	2 (33)	(United States) Montana, (Hungary) Budapest 3, (United Kingdom) Manchester, (Mexico) Jalisco, (Switzerland) Geneva, (Romania) Bucharest, (Switzerland) Geneva, (United States) Montana.	March 23, 2020
Ivleeva vs Bednyakov. Unreleased	3 (34)	(United States) Colorado, (United States) Texas, (United Kingdom) Manchester, (Italy) Milan 2, (Switzerland) Geneva, Maldives 4.	May 31, 2020
Wonders of the World 2. Unreleased
Wonders of the World 2. Unreleased	Number	Episodes	First aired
Wonders of the World 2. Unreleased	1 (35)	(Italy) Battle of the Oranges.	May 24, 2020
Wonders of the World 2. Unreleased	2 (36)	(Benin) West African Vodun, (Tanzania) Kilimanjaro.	May 31, 2020
Crazy weekends. Unreleased
Crazy weekends. Unreleased	Number	Episodes	First aired
Crazy weekends. Unreleased	1 (37)	(Italy) Venice 3, (India) Andaman Islands, (United States) Las Vegas 3, (Italy) Venice 3, (United States) New York City 4, (United States) San Francisco 3.	May 24, 2020
Crazy weekends. Unreleased	Wonders of the World 3. Unreleased		
Number	Wonders of the World 3. Unreleased	Episodes	First aired
1 (38)	Wonders of the World 3. Unreleased	(Turkey) Bosphorus, (Mexico) Wells Maya, (Kenya) Big African Five.	March 20, 2021
2 (39)	Wonders of the World 3. Unreleased	(Uganda) Lake Victoria, (France) Mont-Saint-Michel, Tribes of Ethiopia, (Germany) Rhine Valley, (Croatia) Plitvice Lakes.	April 3, 2021
Girls. Unreleased	Wonders of the World 3. Unreleased		
Girls. Unreleased	Number	Episodes	First aired
Girls. Unreleased	1 (40)	Albania 2, Kazakhstan, Tanzania 2.	May 22, 2021
Girls. Unreleased	2 (41)	North Macedonia, Montenegro 2, Bosnia and Herzegovina, (United Arab Emirates) Dubai 2, Maldives 5.	July 31, 2021
Girls. Unreleased	10 Years. Unreleased		
Number	10 Years. Unreleased	Episodes	First aired
1 (42)	10 Years. Unreleased	Undiscovered Portugal, (Jordan) Amman, (United States) Atlanta, (Colombia) Medellín.	May 30, 2021
2 (43)	10 Years. Unreleased	(Jordan) Amman, (Colombia) Medellín.	June 8, 2021
Wonders of the World 4. Unreleased	10 Years. Unreleased		
Wonders of the World 4. Unreleased	Number	Episodes	First aired
Wonders of the World 4. Unreleased	1 (44)	(El Salvador) Route of Flowers, (Switzerland) Lake of Four Cantons, (Spain) Gold of Las Médulas, (United States) (Mexico) Chihuahuan Desert.	July 26, 2021
Wonders of the World 4. Unreleased	2 (45)	(Mexico) Earth Indians, Cape Verde Islands, (Mexico) Monterrey Summit.	August 2, 2021
Wonders of the World 4. Unreleased	Earthlings. Unreleased		
Number	Earthlings. Unreleased	Episodes	First aired
1 (46)	Earthlings. Unreleased	(United Arab Emirates) Dubaians, (Colombia) Colombians, (Netherlands) Dutch.	January 31, 2022
2 (47)	Earthlings. Unreleased	(Turkey) Turks, (Armenia) Armenians, (Mexico) Maya.	February 7, 2022
Wonders of the World 5. Unreleased	Earthlings. Unreleased		
Wonders of the World 5. Unreleased	Number	Episodes	First aired
Wonders of the World 5. Unreleased	1 (48)	(Greece) White Islands Cyclades, (Greece) Zakynthos. Turtle Island, (Rwanda) Mountain gorilla.	February 13, 2022

=== Canceled episodes ===
Season	Location	Hosts	Reason for cancellation
7	(Turkmenistan) Ashgabat	Andrey and Nastya	The crew couldn't get a visa to Turkmenistan.
10	(Morocco) Essaouira	Lesya and Kolya	The crew failed to obtain official permission to shoot from the authorities of Morocco.
12	(Iran) Tehran	Lesya and Regina	The crew failed to obtain official permission to shoot from the authorities of Iran.
19	(North Korea) Pyongyang	Nastya and Evsey	The project team was unable to obtain official permission to show the release, several stories from the release were shown in the "Unreleased".

=== Special episodes ===
Sochi
Sochi	Episode #	Location	Hosts	Gold card holder	First aired	Comments
Sochi	1 (1)	(Russia) Sochi	Anton Lavrentyev, Zhanna Badoeva	Anton	August 19, 2016	Also visited Krasnaya Polyana and Uch-Dere
Around the World
Around the World	Episode #	Name	Hosts		First aired	
Around the World	1 (2)	New Year. Part 1	Regina Todorenko, Pyotr Romanov, Yevgen Synelnykov, Elena Sinelnikova, Oleg Avilov, Oleg; Shevchyshyn, Jaroslav Andrushchenko, Lesya Nikityuk, Masha Ivakova, Zhanna Badoeva.		December 31, 2016	
Around the World	2 (3)	New Year. Part 2	Regina Todorenko, Pyotr Romanov, Yevgen Synelnykov, Elena Sinelnikova, Oleg Avilov, Oleg Shevchyshyn, Jaroslav Andrushchenko.		January 1, 2017	
Russia	Episode #	Location	Hosts	Gold card holder	First aired	Comments
Russia	1 (1)	(Irkutsk Oblast) (Buryatia) Baikal	Regina Todorenko, Vlad Topalov	Regina	May 14, 2018	Previously visited in Season 7's Episode 8; Visited Ulan-Ude, Listvyanka, Olkhon Island, Tarbagatay
Russia	2 (2)	(Krasnodar Krai) Krasnodar	Zhanna Badoeva, Timur Rodrigez	Timur	May 21, 2018	Visited Adygea, Abrau-Dyurso, Gelendzhik, Leucadia valley
Russia	3 (3)	(Murmansk Oblast) Kola Peninsula	Masha Ivakova, Danil Vahrushev	Masha	May 28, 2018	Visited Murmansk, Teriberka, Kirovsk, Loparskaya
Russia	4 (4)	(Kabardino-Balkaria) Prielbrusye	Masha Ivakova, Aiza	Aiza	June 4, 2018	Visited Nalchik, Prielbrusye National Park, Tyrnyauz
Russia	5 (5)	(Stavropol Krai) Mineralnye Vody	Zhanna Badoeva, Ida Galich	Zhanna	June 12, 2018	Visited Pyatigorsk
Russia	6 (6)	(Astrakhan Oblast) Astrakhan	Zhanna Badoeva, Mikhail Bashkatov	Zhanna	June 19, 2018	Visited Sarai, Caspian Depression
Russia	7 (7)	(Tatarstan) Kazan	Zhanna Badoeva, Andrey Skorohod	Andrey	June 26, 2018	Previously visited in Season 7's Episode 3
Russia	8 (8)	(Kaliningrad Oblast) Kaliningrad	Zhanna Badoeva, Masha Minogarova	Zhanna	July 3, 2018	Previously visited in Season 7's Episode 18
Russia	9 (9)	(Yaroslavl Oblast) Yaroslavl	Klava Koka, Illya Sobolev	Illya	July 10, 2018	Also visited Kostroma
Russia	10 (10)	(Vladimir Oblast) Vladimir	Klava Koka, Sati Kazanova	Klava	July 17, 2018	Also visited Suzdal
Russia	11 (11)	(Primorsky Krai) Vladivostok	Zhanna Badoeva, Alexandra Vlasova	Zhanna	July 24, 2018	Previously visited in Season 7's Episode 9; Visited Krasny Yar
Russia	12 (12)	(Altai Republic) Altai	Klava Koka, Masha Gorban	Masha	August 7, 2018	Visited Gorno-Altaysk, Altai Mountains
Russia	13 (13)	(Sakhalin Oblast) Sakhalin	Masha Ivakova, Ida Galich	Ida	August 14, 2018	
Russia	14 (14)	Moscow	Regina Todorenko, Klava Koka	Klava	August 21, 2018	Previously visited in Season 7's Episode 20; Visited Rublyovka
Russia	15 (15)	(Republic of Karelia) Karelia	Klava Koka, Natan Mirov	Natan	August 28, 2018	Visited Petrozavodsk
Russia	16 (16)	Saint Petersburg	Klava Koka, Olga Antipova	Olga	September 4, 2018	
Russia	17 (17)	(Krasnoyarsk Krai) Krasnoyarsk	Zhanna Badoeva, Vitya "AK"	Vitya	September 11, 2018	
Russia	18 (18)	(Sakha Republic) Yakutia	Zhanna Badoeva, Olga Antipova	Olga	September 18, 2018	Visited Yakutsk
Russia	19 (19)	(Sverdlovsk Oblast) Yekaterinburg	Klava Koka, Olga Antipova	Klava	September 25, 2018	
Russia	20 (20)	(Krasnodar Krai) Sochi	Regina Todorenko, Olga Antipova	Regina	October 1, 2018	Previously visited in Special Episode 1; Visited Matsesta, Adler, Lazarevskoye, Mamedova Shchel

==== Season 2 (2019) ====
No.	Name	Currency	VZK	Release premiere
1 (21)	Buryatia (Note: Second issue about this place.)	Dollar	Maria Minogarova	October 15, 2019
2 (22)	St. Petersburg (Note: Third issue about this place.)	Dollar	Maria Gorban	October 22, 2019
3 (23)	Kaliningrad Oblast	Dollar	Maria Minogarova	October 29, 2019
4 (24)	Moscow	Dollar	Maria Gorban	November 9, 2019
5 (25)	Chelyabinsk Oblast	Dollar	Maria Gorban	November 16, 2019
6 (26)	Kamchatka	Dollar	Maria Gorban	November 19, 2019
7 (27)	Nizhny Novgorod	Dollar	Maria Minogarova	November 26, 2019
8 (28)	Khakassia	Dollar	Maria Minogarova	December 3, 2019
9 (29)	Krasnodar Sochi	Dollar	Maria Gorban	December 10, 2019
10 (30)	Altai	Dollar	Maria Minogarova	December 17, 2019

== Oryol i Reshka: Family ==
Oryol i Reshka: Family or Oryol i Reshka: Semya is a project, that is being followed by Friday! channel. In this project, a family of four people (father + son, mother + daughter) goes to different locations, throw a coin and show how to travel with children.

Episode #	Location	Gold card holder	First aired
1	(Japan) Tokyo	Kate and Alexandra	July 9, 2018
2	(Indonesia) Bali	Kolya and Alexandra	April 2, 2019
3	Singapore	Kate and George	April 9, 2019
4	(United Arab Emirates) Dubai	Kolya and George	April 16, 2019
5	(South Africa) Cape Town	Kate and George	April 23, 2019
6	(Portugal) Lisbon	Kolya and George	September 2, 2019
7	(Canary Islands) Tenerife	Kate and Alexandra	September 9, 2019
8	(Spain) Barcelona	Kolya and Alexandra	September 16, 2019
9	(Netherlands) Amsterdam	Kate and Alexandra	September 23, 2019
10–11	(Mexico) Cancún	Kate and George	April 18 and 25, 2020

== Oryol i Reshka: Shopping ==
=== Episode list ===
Season 1
Season 1	Episode #	Location	Gold card holder	First aired
Season 1	1 (1)	(United States) New York City	Masha	February 15, 2014
Season 1	2 (2)	(United States) Miami	Masha	February 22, 2014
Season 1	3 (3)	Mexico City	Masha	March 1, 2014
Season 1	4 (4)	Hong Kong	Masha	March 8, 2014
Season 1	5 (5)	Singapore	Masha	March 15, 2014
Season 1	6 (6)	(Malaysia) Kuala Lumpur	Masha	March 22, 2014
Season 1	7 (7)	(Vietnam) Hanoi	Kostya	March 29, 2014
Season 1	8 (8)	(United Arab Emirates) Dubai	Masha	April 5, 2014
Season 1	9 (9)	(India) Delhi	Kostya	April 12, 2014
Season 1	10 (10)	(Turkey) Istanbul	Kostya	April 19, 2014
Season 1	11 (11)	(Israel) Tel Aviv	Kostya	April 26, 2014
Season 1	12 (12)	(United States) Los Angeles	Kostya	May 3, 2014
Season 2
Season 2	Episode #	Location	Gold card holder	First aired
Season 2	1 (13)	(Peru) Lima	Anton	May 10, 2014
Season 2	2 (14)	Santiago de Chile	Anton	May 20, 2014
Season 2	3 (15)	(Argentina) Buenos Aires	Masha	May 27, 2014
Season 2	4 (16)	(Brazil) Rio de Janeiro	Masha	June 3, 2014
Season 2	5 (17)	(Portugal) Lisbon	Anton	June 10, 2014
Season 2	6 (18)	(Spain) Madrid	Masha	June 17, 2014
Season 2	7 (19)	(Spain) Barcelona	Masha	June 24, 2014
Season 2	8 (20)	(Morocco) Marrakesh	Anton	July 1, 2014
Season 2	9 (21)	(France) Paris	Masha	July 8, 2014
Season 2	10 (22)	(Germany) Berlin	Masha	July 15, 2014
Season 2	11 (23)	(Italy) Rome	Masha	July 22, 2014
Season 2	12 (24)	(Italy) Milan	Anton	July 29, 2014
Season 2	13 (25)	(Greece) Athenes	Masha	August 5, 2014
Season 2	14 (26)	(France) Marseille	Masha	August 12, 2014
Season 2	15 (27)	(Austria) Vienna	Masha	August 19, 2014
Season 2	16 (28)	(Switzerland) Zürich	Anton	August 26, 2014
Season 2	17 (29)	(Netherlands) Amsterdam	Anton	September 2, 2014
Season 2	18 (30)	(Finland) Helsinki	Anton	September 9, 2014
Season 2	19 (31)	(Latvia) Riga	Anton	September 16, 2014
Season 2	20 (32)	(Sweden) Stockholm	Masha	September 23, 2014
Season 2	21 (33)	(Jordan) Amman	Anton	September 30, 2014
Season 2	22 (34)	(Egypt) Cairo	Anton	October 7, 2014
Season 2	23 (35)	(Lebanon) Beirut	Masha	October 14, 2014
Season 2	24 (36)	Malta	Masha	October 21, 2014
Season 2	25 (37)	(China) Guangzhou	Masha	October 28, 2014
Season 2	26 (38)	(South Korea) Seoul	Anton	November 4, 2014
Season 2	27 (39)	(Japan) Tokyo	Masha	November 11, 2014
Season 2	28 (40)	(Japan) Kyoto	Anton	November 18, 2014
Season 2	29 (41)	(Thailand) Bangkok	Masha	November 25, 2014
Season 2	30 (42)	(Taiwan) Taipei	Anton	December 2, 2014
Season 2	31 (43)	Indonesia	Anton	December 9, 2014
Season 2	32 (44)	(Nepal) Kathmandu	Anton	December 16, 2014
Season 2	33 (45)	(Hungary) Budapest	Masha	December 23, 2014
Season 2	34 (46)	(United Kingdom) London	Masha	December 30, 2014
Season 3
Season 3	Episode #	Location	Gold card holder	First aired
Season 3	1 (47)	(Czech Republic) Prague	Masha	February 10, 2015
Season 3	2 (48)	(Belgium) Brussels	Masha	February 17, 2015
Season 3	3 (49)	(Italy) Naples	Masha	February 24, 2015
Season 3	4 (50)	(United States) Las Vegas	Masha	March 6, 2015
Season 3	5 (51)	(United States) San Francisco	Anton	March 13, 2015
Season 3	6 (52)	(United States) Austin	Anton	March 20, 2015
Season 3	7 (53)	(United States) New Orleans	Anton	March 27, 2015
Season 3	8 (54)	(United States) Chicago	Masha	April 3, 2015
Season 3	9 (55)	(United States) Seattle	Anton	April 10, 2015
Season 3	10 (56)	Sri Lanka	Anton	April 17, 2015
Season 3	11 (57)	(Philippines) Manila	Masha	April 24, 2015
Season 3	12 (58)	(Cambodia) Phnom Penh	Masha	May 1, 2015
Season 3	13 (59)	(China) Shanghai	Masha	May 8, 2015
Season 3	14 (60)	(China) Beijing	Masha	May 15, 2015
Season 3	15 (61)	Tunisia	Anton	May 22, 2015
Season 3	16 (62)	Tanzania	Anton	May 29, 2015
Season 3	17 (63)	Madagascar	Masha	June 5, 2015
Season 3	18 (64)	(Namibia) Windhoek	Anton	June 12, 2015
Season 3	19 (65)	(Georgia (country)) Tbilisi	Anton	June 19, 2015
Season 3	20 (66)	(Azerbaijan) Baku	Masha	June 26, 2015
Season 4
Season 4	Episode #	Location	Gold card holder	First aired
Season 4	1 (67)	Uzbekistan	Masha	September 4, 2015
Season 4	2 (68)	(Poland) Kraków	Masha	September 11, 2015
Season 4	3 (69)	(Germany) Munich	Masha	September 18, 2015
Season 4	4 (70)	(Italy) Venice	Anton	September 25, 2015
Season 4	5 (71)	(Kazakhstan) Almaty	Masha	October 2, 2015
Season 4	6 (72)	(Republic of Ireland) Dublin	Anton	October 9, 2015
Season 4	7 (73)	(Norway) Oslo	Anton	October 16, 2015
Season 4	8 (74)	(France) French Riviera	Masha	October 23, 2015
Season 4	9 (75)	(Croatia) Zagreb	Masha	October 30, 2015
Season 4	10 (76)	(Spain) Ibiza	Anton	November 6, 2015
Season 4	11 (77)	(Cuba) Havana	Anton	November 13, 2015
Season 4	12 (78)	(Costa Rica) Costa-Rica	Masha	November 20, 2015
Season 4	13 (79)	Panama	Masha	November 27, 2015
Season 4	14 (80)	(Bolivia) La Paz	Anton	December 4, 2015
Season 4	15 (81)	(Brazil) São Paulo	Masha	December 7, 2015
Season 5
Season 5	Episode #	Location	Gold card holder	First aired
Season 5	1 (82)	(Armenia) Yerevan	Masha	March 8, 2016
Season 5	2 (83)	(Estonia) Tallinn	Masha	March 15, 2016
Season 5	3 (84)	Ethiopia	Egor	March 22, 2016
Season 5	4 (85)	Kenya	Egor	March 29, 2016
Season 5	5 (86)	(South Africa) Cape Town	Masha	April 5, 2016
Season 5	6 (87)	Mauritius	Egor	April 12, 2016
Season 5	7 (88)	(India) Mumbai	Masha	April 23, 2016
Season 5	8 (89)	(Mexico) Guadalajara	Masha	April 30, 2016
Season 5	9 (90)	Ecuador	Egor	June 9, 2016
Season 5	10 (91)	(Colombia) Bogotá	Masha	June 16, 2016
Season 5	11 (92)	(Dominican Republic) Dominicana	Egor	June 30, 2016
Season 5	12 (93)	Romania	Masha	July 7, 2016
Season 5	13 (94)	(Netherlands) Rotterdam	Egor	July 14, 2016
Season 5	14 (95)	(Denmark) Copenhagen	Egor	July 21, 2016
Season 5	15 (96)	Belarus	Masha	July 28, 2016
Season 5	16 (97)	(United States) Washington	Masha	August 4, 2014
Season 5	17 (98)	(United States) Boston	Masha	August 11, 2014
Season 5	18 (99)	(Canada) Toronto	Masha	August 18, 2014
Season 5	19 (100)	(Georgia (country)) Batumi	Masha	June 23, 2016
Season 5	20 (101)	(United States) Anchorage	Masha	October 8, 2016
Season 6
Season 6	Episode #	Location	Gold card holder	First aired
Season 6	1 (102)	(Canada) Vancouver	Egor	October 1, 2016
Season 6	2 (103)	Iran	Masha	October 15, 2016
Season 6	3 (104)	(China) Shenzhen	Egor	January 14, 2017
Season 6	4 (105)	(Myanmar) Yangon	Masha	October 22, 2016
Season 6	5 (106)	(Italy) Palermo	Masha	January 21, 2017
Season 6	6 (107)	Iceland	Egor	October 29, 2016
Season 6	7 (108)	(Spain) Andalusia	Egor	November 5, 2016
Season 6	8 (109)	(Germany) Hamburg	Masha	September 24, 2016
Season 6	9 (110)	Maldives	Egor	November 12, 2016
Season 6	10 (111)	(Laos) Luang Phabang	Masha	November 19, 2016
Season 6	11 (112)	(China) Macau	Egor	November 26, 2016
Season 6	12 (113)	Tibet	Masha	December 3, 2016
Season 6	13 (114)	(Lithuania) Vilnius	Masha	December 10, 2016
Season 6	14 (115)	(Bulgaria) Sofia	Egor	December 24, 2016
Season 6	15 (116)	(Belgium) Flanders	Egor	December 17, 2016
Season 6	16 (117)	(Ukraine) Lviv	Masha	November 27, 2016
Season 6	17 (118)	(Ukraine) Kyiv	Egor	December 4, 2016
Season 6	18 (119)	(United States) New York City	Masha	December 31, 2016

=== Oryol i Reshka: Shopping. Unreleased ===
Shopping. Unreleased
Shopping. Unreleased	Number	Episodes	First aired
Shopping. Unreleased	1 (1)	(United States) Las Vegas, (Cambodia) Phnom Penh, (Finland) Helsinki, (Italy) Naples, (China) Beijing, (Namibia) Windhoek.	August 21, 2015
Shopping. Unreleased	2 (2)	(Japan) Kyoto, (Georgia (country)) Tbilisi, (Nepal) Kathmandu, (Thailand) Bangkok, (United Kingdom) London.	August 28, 2015
Shopping. Unreleased	3 (3)	Panama, (Germany) Hamburg, (Myanmar) Yangon, (Ukraine) Lviv.	December 11, 2016
Shopping. Unreleased	4 (4)	Tibet, (Ukraine) Kyiv, (China) Macau, Belarus.	December 18, 2016

== See also ==
- Wish You Were Here...? - A British show with a similar format
