= Sinelnikov =

Sinelnikov, Synelnykov (Russian or Ukrainian: Синельников, from Синельник meaning a blue-color dyer) or Siņeļņikovs (Latvian spelling) is a Russian masculine surname, its feminine counterpart is Sinelnikova. Notable people with the surname include:

- Alans Siņeļņikovs (born 1990), Latvian football player
- Cyril Sinelnikov (1901–1966), was a Russian nuclear physicist
- Nikolai Sinelnikov (1855—1939), Russian stage actor
- Yevgen Synelnykov (born 1981), Ukrainian TV presenter and actor
- Denis Sinelnikov (born 1979), Digital Marketing Pioneer and entrepreneur
