= Michelle Andrade =

Ukrainian singer and TV presenter (born 1996)

- Міchеlle Аndrade
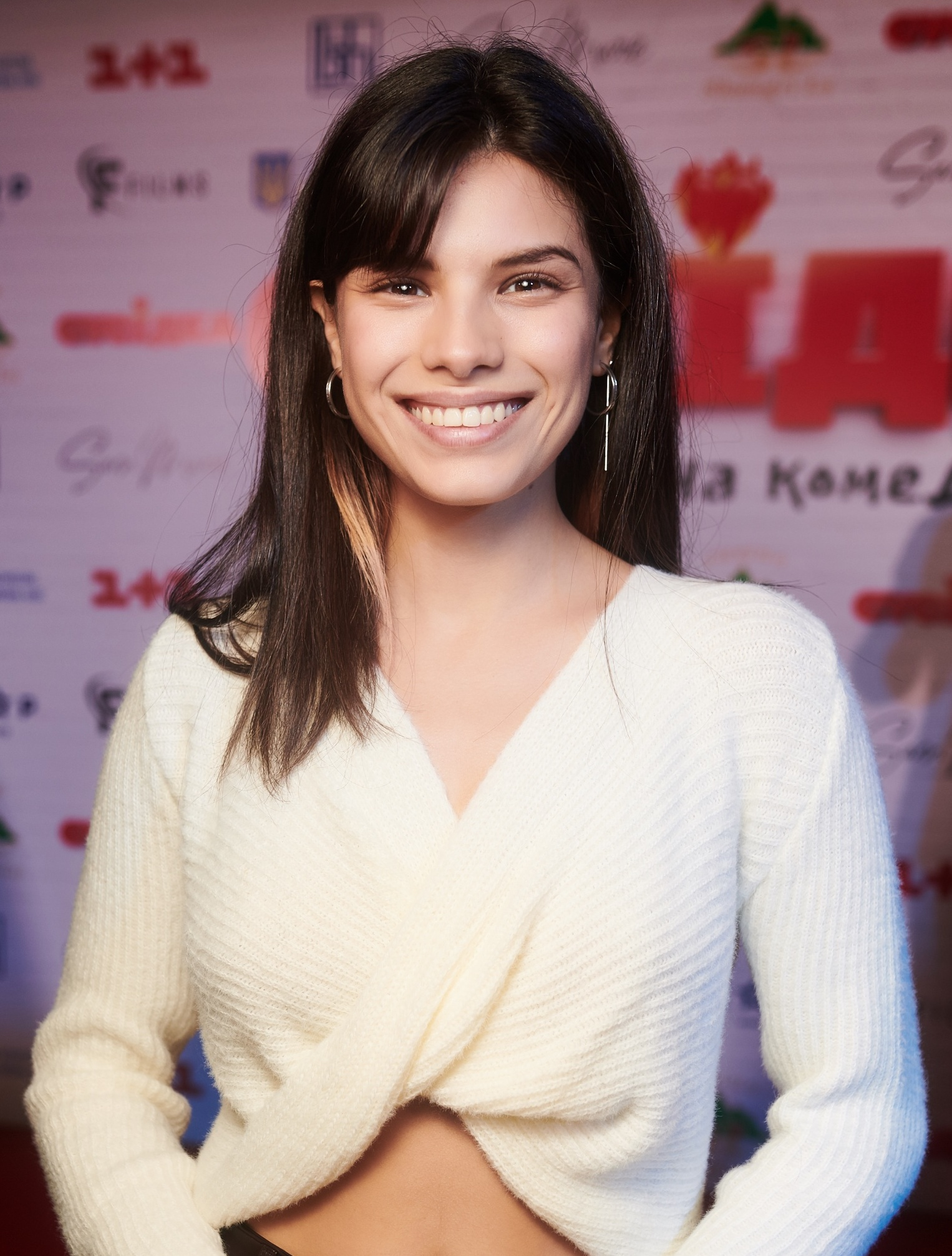
- Andrade in December 2022
- Born: 10 November 1996 (age 29); Cochabamba, Bolivia
- Other name: Mishel Stefani Andrade Chekasina
- Occupations: Singer; television presenter
- Years active: 2013–present
- Musical career
- Genre: Pop
- Instrument: Vocals
- Label: Pomitni

Mishel Stefani Andrade Chekasina (Ukrainian: Мішель Стефані Андраде Чекасіна; born 10 November 1996), commonly known as Michelle Andrade, is a Bolivian-Ukrainian singer and television presenter. She sings in Spanish, Ukrainian, English, Portuguese and Russian.

== Early life ==
Andrade was born in Cochabamba, Bolivia on 10 November 1996 to a Bolivian father and a Ukrainian mother. As a child, she was engaged in rhythmic gymnastics, volleyball and dance. In 2010, she moved to Ukraine. At the same time she entered the music school with a degree in piano and at the same time took up singing.

== Career ==
In 2013, Andrade took part in the show X-Factor, where she was noticed by producer Potap. She first appeared on the big stage on 2 October 2014, performing with the band Mozgi at a concert organized by M1 TV channel.

In 2015 she appeared in the music video for the song "Scream" by the Ukrainian rock band O.Torvald. On 2 October 2016, she released her first song "Amor", and in December of the same year her music video was released. On 2 November 2017, Andrade's second music video for "Enough Whistling" was released. Andrade also whistled in the song. Two days later, her first big solo concert took place. On 15 December, she released the song "Winter" and a video for it on her YouTube channel.

On 25 April 25, 2018, at the Manu Restaurant in Kyiv, Andrade presented her first mini album, La Primavera Boliviana, which was officially released on two days later. The album includes five songs, a solo version of "Amor", "Winter", "Enough Whistling", "Musica" and "Taya". A single called "Hasta la Vista" was released on 2 November, and a video for it on 30 November. On 27 June 2019, she released her first studio album called Latino Ritmo. In 2020, according to TopHit, the song "I Don't Know" had been played 264,396 times on Ukrainian radio stations. In 2021, together with Positive, she became a host of the Ukrainian TV travel show Orel i reshka.

She was part of the Ukrainian jury at the Junior Eurovision Song Contest 2024.

== Discography ==
=== Studio albums ===
- 2019: Latino Ritmo

=== EP ===
- 2018: La Primavera Boliviana

=== Singles ===
- 2016: «Amor»
- 2017: «Хватит свистеть»
- 2017: «Зима»
- 2018: «Musica»
- 2018: «Hasta la Vista»
- 2019: «Fe»
- 2019: «Corazon»
- 2019: «Не знаю»
- 2020: «Misterios»
- 2020: «Proud»
- 2020: «Tonight»
- 2020: «Mirror»
- 2020: «100 000 минут» feat. Positiff
