= Zhanna Badoeva =

Ukrainian TV personality (born 1976)

- Жанна Бадоева
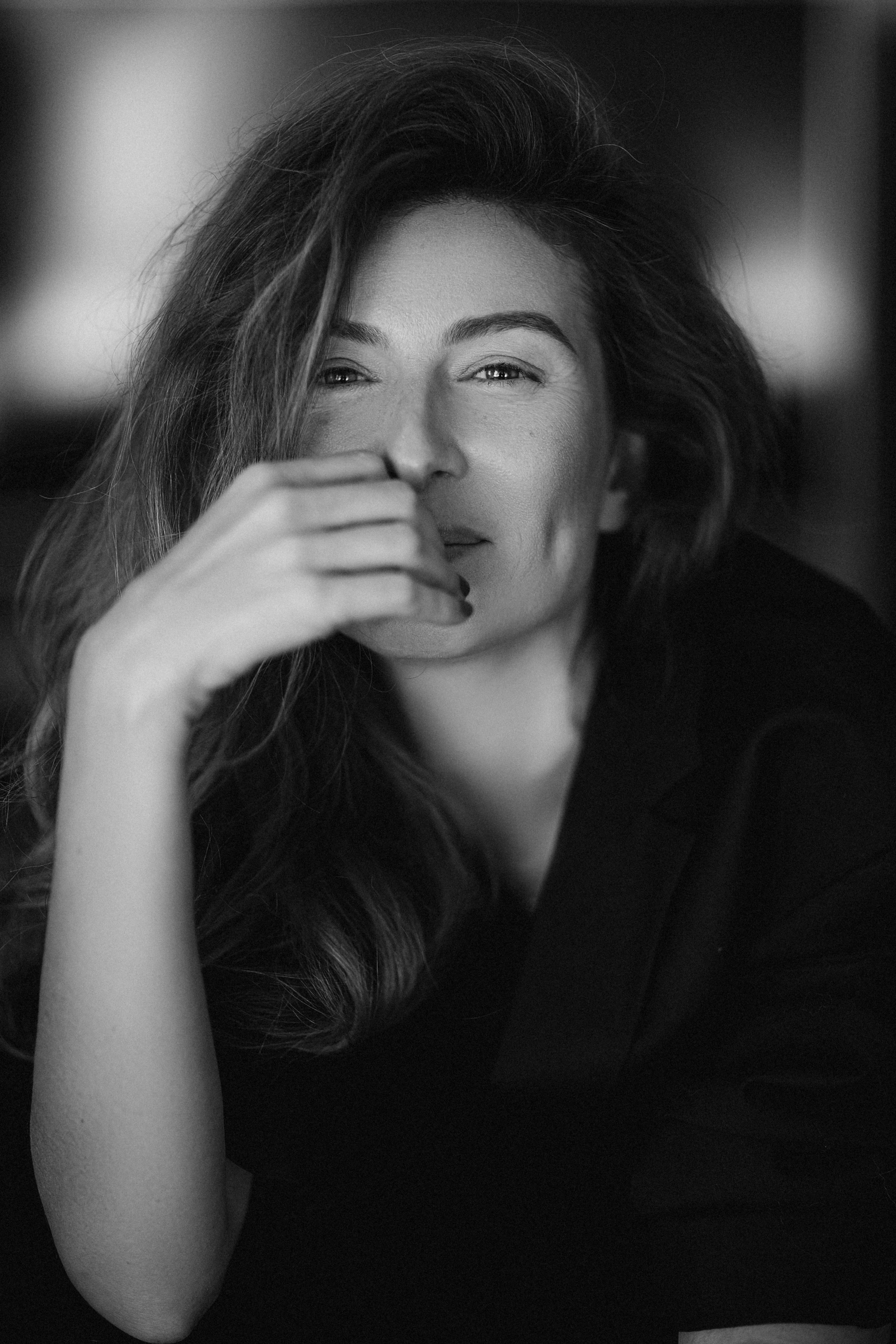
- Born: Zhanna Iosifovna Dolgopolskaya; 18 March 1976 (age 50); Mažeikiai, Lithuanian SSR, Soviet Union (now Lithuania)
- Citizenship: Italy
- Occupations: Producer, TV personality, actress, designer, traveller, TV director, tutor
- Spouses: Igor Kurachenko (m. 1996; div. 1998) Alan Badoev (m. 2003; div. 2012) Vasily Melnichyn (m. 2015)
- Children: 2
- Website: zhannabadoeva.com

Zhanna Iosifovna Badoeva (Russian: Жа́нна Ио́сифовна Бадо́ева, née Dolgopolskaya, Долгопо́льская; born 18 March 1976) is a TV personality and producer. She is known for being the host and onscreen moderator of the travel program Oryol i Reshka.

== Life and career ==
Badoeva graduated from an acting technique course at the Kyiv University of Culture.

Badoeva was the first woman to be a permanent host on Comedy Club U.A. She was involved in the development of TV shows such as Dancing for You, Superstar, Sharmanka (Hurdy-gurdy), and Lyalechka.

In 2011, Badoeva worked on Oryol i Reshka, on which she acted as on-screen moderator alongside her husband Alan Badoev. She left the project in 2012, after the end of its third season, and was replaced by Lesya Nikitjuk.

On 8 February 2015, Badoeva participated in the 10th anniversary of Oryol i Reshka. In November 2017 it was revealed that Badoeva would come back to participate in an episode of the "Stars" season.

Starting on 5 March 2015, on the TV channel Pyatnitsa!, Badoeva hosted Beauty Salons Battle for two seasons.

In September 2015, Badoeva introduced her new show #ZhannaPozheny (Zhanna Marry Us Off), also on Pyatnitsa!. The concept of the show was to demonstrate various types of marriages, which Badoeva had arranged and organized in different locations around the world. This project was subsequently terminated.

In 2016, Badoeva hosted Dangerous Gigs alongside Vladimir Petrov, also known as Vova-the-Meat.

On 17 October 2016, Badoeva debuted her eponymous footwear collection ZHANNA BADOEVA, in cooperation with well-known Italian designer Ernesto Esposito, and in 2017 she launched an online store.

In 2017, Badoeva acted as a host of her auteur project ZhannaPomogy (or Zhanna Help). The program aimed to help girls who felt insecure with themselves choose real-life relations over online dating.

In 2018, Badoeva participated in the program Oryol i Reshka, Russia with Ida Galich.

== Personal life ==
Badoeva was born in Mažeikiai, Lithuanian SSR, USSR.

In 1996, she married Igor Kurachenko and the pair had a son, Boris. Badoeva and Kurachenko divorced in 1998.

In 2003, Badoeva married her Oryol i Reshka co-star Alan Badoev. Together, they had a daughter, Lolita, and divorced in 2012.

In 2013, Badoeva moved to Italy with her children.

In 2015, Badoeva married Vasily Melnichyn, a Ukrainian businessman based in Italy.

== Controversies ==
In January 2023, the Government of Ukraine, under a decree signed by President Volodymyr Zelenskyy, imposed personal sanctions on Badoeva for her public support of Russia amid the 2022 Russian invasion of Ukraine.

The sanctions were part of a broader package targeting 119 Russian and pro-Russian cultural figures, including television personalities, artists, and media representatives, accused of propagating or justifying Russian aggression.

Ukrainian and international outlets such as The Kyiv Independent and Interfax-Ukraine reported that Badoeva was included in the official sanctions list due to her continued work in Russia’s entertainment industry and her failure to condemn the invasion, which authorities characterized as an implicit endorsement of Kremlin policies.

== Filmography ==
- Oryol i Reshka (Inter., Pyatnitsa!), host (seasons 1–3, 10)
- MasterChef Ukraine (STB), jury member (2nd season)
- Beauty Salons Battle (Pyatnitsa!), host
- #ZhannaPozheny (Pyatnitsa!), host
- Dangerous Gigs (Pyatnitsa!), host
- ZhannaPomogy (Pyatnitsa!), host
