= Regina Todorenko =

Ukrainian singer (born 1990)

Regina Todorenko Регина Тодоренко
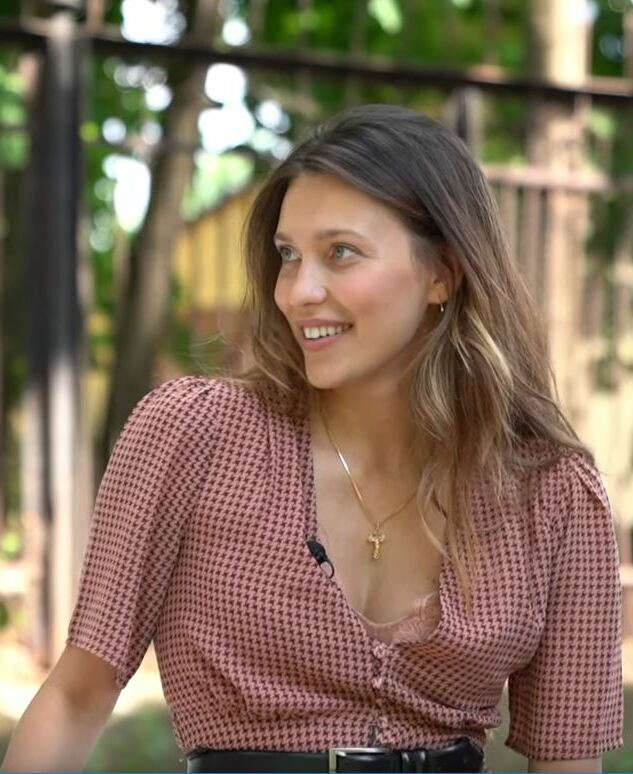
- Todorenko in 2019

Background information
- Born: Ukrainian: Regina Petrivna Todorenko; Russian: Regina Petrovna Todorenko; 14 June 1990 (age 36); Odesa, Ukrainian SSR, Soviet Union (now Ukraine)
- Genre: Pop
- Occupations: Singer, presenter
- Years active: 2008–present
- Website: todorenkoregina.com

Rehina Petrivna Todorenko (Ukrainian: Регіна Петрівна Тодоренко also Regina Petrovna Todorenko in Russian: Регина Петровна Тодоренко; born 14 June 1990) is a Ukrainian and Russian pop-singer and television presenter

== Biography ==
Regina Todorenko was born 14 June 1990 in Odesa. As a child she spent a lot of time in the theatre studio, dance class, and took vocal lessons. She finished school with honors in 2007. In the same year Regina enrolled in the Odesa National Maritime University, the faculty of "Organization of transport and transport systems". In 2010 she entered the Kyiv National University of Culture and Arts, receiving a Master's Degree in Theatre Arts.

From 2014 to 2021 she was the host of the program "Oryol i Reshka".

In 2015 Regina Todorenko recorded her debut song and shot a video for the song "Heart's Beating". In the same year she became a member of the Russian show "Voice". At the blind audition Regina performed the song Tina Karol "the Night". Her tutor was Polina Gagarina.

She appeared in the ninth season of ice show contest Ice Age.

== Controversy ==
On April 23, 2020, Todorenko was interviewed by Laura Dzhugelia of PeopleTalk, a celebrity news outlet. During the interview, she made comments about domestic abuse, including asking, “What did you do to make him hit you?". Days later, Russian Glamour magazine stripped her of the "Woman of the Year" title. Todorenko apologised for the comments, saying she was opposed to all domestic violence and had used an incorrect formulation.

During the Russian invasion of Ukraine, Todorenko came under mass scrutiny in Ukraine for her silence on the conflict as Ukrainian in Russia. She stated that she and her husband, Russian singer Vlad Topalov, had prohibited discussion over politics due to irreconcilable views on the war. The backlash intensified as she remained silent even as it was revealed that an ex-boyfriend, Alik, was killed during the Bucha massacre; her only response was an Instragram story featuring a candle and a line from Russian poet Marina Tsvetaeva. Mykola Serga, a colleague of Todorenko from Oryol i Reshka, claimed that her silence demonstrated "her true colors" and that even though she carries a Ukrainian passport, she was not a true citizen of Ukraine.

In October 2022, she was subject to sanctions by the National Security and Defense Council of Ukraine, along with Taisia Povaliy, Ani Lorak and Anna Sedokova, who were other Ukrainian celebrities in Russia who chose to remain in the country and express silence on the war against their country.

== Discography ==
=== Singles ===
- 2015 — Биение сердца (Heart's Beating)
- 2015 — Ты мне нужен (I Need You)
- 2016 — Мама (Mum)

== Music videos ==
Year	Song	Director
2008	«Синий иней»	
2009	«Я бы»	Alan Badoev
2009	«Платье»	Sergey Solodskiy
2010	«Я все еще люблю тебя»	Fil Li
2010	«Стихии»	
2011	«Мужчины любят глазами»	Fil Li
2011	«Уходи на фиг»	Elena Chirva
2012	«Я бы…»	Natalya Mogilevskaya
2012	«Луна» («Я в белом платьице»)»	Oleg Borshevskiy
2012	«Ёлки»	Oleg Borshevskiy
2013	«Без него»	Olga Navrotskaya
2015	«Heart's Beating»	Oleg Bogdan
2015	«Биение сердца»	Oleg Bogdan
2015	«Кушай-кушай» (featuring Kolya Serga)	
2015	«Ты мне нужен»	Radislav Lukin
2016	«Liverpool»	Oleg Bogdan
2016	«Fire»	Elena Chirva

== Covers ==
Song	Notes
«Hit the road Jack»	
«Виват, Король»	
«Рідний край»	
«Каникулы любви»	
«Gangnam Style»	
«Да Босс»	

== Singles ==
Song	Notes
«Мужчины любят глазами»	
«Уходи на фиг»	
«Стихии»	
«Обыкновенное чудо»	
«Раз и два»	
«Луна (Я в белом платьице)»	
«Ёлки»	
«Где же ты, любовь»	
«Без него»	

=== Actress ===
Music videos
Year	Song title	Artist	Director
2015	"Пора домой"	Svetlana Loboda	Natella Krapivina
