= Tarbagatay, Khorinsky District, Republic of Buryatia =

Village in Khorinsky District, Buryatia, Russia

Coordinates: 52°6′44″N 109°11′55″E

Tarbagatay (Russian: Тарбагатай) is a rural locality (a selo) in Khorinsky District of the Republic of Buryatia, Russia. Population: 157 (2010 census); 211 (2002 census);
