= Friday! =

Russian television channel

Pyatnitsa! Пятница!
- Country: Russia
- Headquarters: Moscow

Programming
- Language(s): Russian
- Picture format: 576i (16:9 SDTV); 1080i (HDTV) (Internet)

Ownership
- Owner: Gazprom Media

History
- Launched: 26 September 1998; 26 years ago (as MTV); 1 June 2013; 11 years ago (as Pyatnitsa!)
- Replaced: MTV

Links
- Website: friday.ru

Availability

Terrestrial
- Digital terrestrial television: Channel 16

Pyatnitsa! (Russian: Пятница!, literally Friday!) is an all-Russian entertainment TV channel. Its broadcast network is based on original entertainment programs of its own production, as well as those produced by Ukrainian TV channels. Friday! began broadcasting on 31 May 2013 on MTV Russia.

== Selected programming ==
- Oryol i Reshka ("Heads or tails")
- Oryol i Reshka. Shopping ("Heads or tails. Shopping")

== Awards ==
The card game Favorite game TV channel Friday!, launched together with the game company Mosigra, won the Mediabrand award as the Best off-air promotional campaign.
