= Beat the Blondes =

- Genre: Game show
- Directed by: Michael A. Simon
- Presented by: Tom Arnold
- Composers: Jeff Lippencott; Mark T. Williams
- Country of origin: United States

Production
- Executive producers: Andrew J. Golder; J. D. Roth
- Producer: Jason Hammonds
- Editors: Kurt T. Jones; Karl Kimbrough; Barry Murphy
- Running time: 60 minutes
- Production companies: Eyeworks; 3 Ball Productions

Original release
- Network: CBS
- Release: October 2007 (Unsold pilot)

Beat the Blondes is an unsold pilot for a television game show format based on preconceptions, prejudice, strategy and statistics. The show was created by Eyeworks and was hosted by Tom Arnold. The grand prize was intended to be US $1,000,000.

== Rules of the game ==
The contestant, strictly male, will demonstrate his ability to fly through a series of questions the 50 blonde women ready to flip the stereotype according to which intelligence cannot get along with beauty. Man is the center of the study and women before him: 7 rows of 7 women on a scale placed at the top of which is the fiftieth. The game, with a prize money of US$1,000,000, is divided into two heats.

=== Round 1 ===
In the first round, the competitor challenges a row at a time choosing between the various applications available categories. If answered correctly, the prize increases with the number of women who respond incorrectly. The fiftieth blonde is addressed in a face to face: the wrong answer if she is double the prize so far accumulated, even if the participant responded correctly. The women who gave incorrect answers are eliminated in the first round, correct respondents continue to play in the second.

In the second round of the party will be able to move only if the game remains no more than 25 blondes.

=== Round 2 ===
In the finale the women are placed in a semicircle in front of the contestant and presenter. At this point the applicant must answer the questions proposed, directly or with multiple choice answers. If the contestant answers correctly, point your finger at a woman believed to have responded incorrectly. If did answered incorrectly she is out of the game and the contestant continues to point the finger until it finds one that has answered correctly, then move to the next question. 10 questions about the competitor may make only three mistakes.

=== Final round ===
When there are only three women, the player can decide to stop and take home the prize earned or proceed in an attempt to eliminate them all, thus winning US$1,000,000. If, however, decided to continue then not being able to eliminate the blondes, the last three will share a predetermined fixed amount of $10,000.

== International versions ==
Country	Name	Host	Channel	Premiere	Prize
Czech Republic	Nepodceňuj blondýnky	Miroslav Šimůnek	Prima TV	2009	1,000,000 Kč
Germany	Beat the Blondes	Janine Kunze	RTL II	2011	New car
Greece	Η Εκδίκηση της Ξανθιάς; I Ekdikisi tis Ksanthias	Giorgos Liagkas	Mega Channel	2009	€300,000
Italy	Batti le Bionde	Enrico Papi	Italia 1	2008	€500,000
Romania	Te pui cu blondele?	Dan Negru	Antena 1	March 6, 2008 – March 1, 2017	300,000 Lei
Russia	50 блондинок 50 blondinok	Nikolay Fomenko	Russia 1	February 16, 2008 – June 28, 2008	1,000,000 руб.
Turkey	Mehmet Ali Erbil ile 50 Sarışın	Mehmet Ali Erbil	Fox	December 20, 2008 – 2010	100,000 ₺
Ukraine	Хто проти блондинок? Khto proty blondynok?	Andriy Domanski (2009–2010); Serhiy Pisarenko (2011); Lesya Nikitjuk (2018–2020)	Novyi Kanal	March 8, 2009 – January 1, 2010; March 5, 2011 – December 31, 2011; August 28, 2018 – June 2, 2020	50,000 ₴

== See also ==
- List of television show franchises
