= M1 (Ukrainian TV channel) =

- Country: Ukraine
- Broadcast area: Ukraine
- Headquarters: Kyiv, Ukraine

Programming
- Language: Ukrainian
- Picture format: 1080i (HDTV) (downscaled to 576i for SDTV)

Ownership
- Owner: Starlight Media
- Sister channels: M2; ICTV; STB; Novyi Kanal

History
- Launched: 27 December 2001

Links
- Website: m1.tv

Availability

Terrestrial
- Zeonbud: MX-2 (14)

M1 is a Ukrainian music television channel. The channel shows lifestyle and music related programs. M1 is a part of Starlight Media broadcasting group, created by Viktor Pinchuk.

In January 2026, the channel suspended its broadcasts on the Astra 4A satellite, citing "technical improvements" as well as the country's financial problems; subsequently on 26 March, the National Radio and Television Council revoked its terrestrial license.

== Logo ==
The channel has changed its logo several times.

Logo	Period
	From 27 December 2001 to present
	From 31 August 2021 to 24 February 2022
	On 24 February 2022, after the Russian invasion of Ukraine, the channel changed its logo to use the colors of the national flag of Ukraine.

== See also ==
- List of Ukrainian-language television channels
