= ICTV2 =

- Country: Ukraine
- Headquarters: Kyiv, Ukraine

Programming
- Picture format: 16:9 (576i, SDTV); 16:9 (1080i, HDTV)

Ownership
- Owner: Starlight Media Group (Victor Pinchuk & Olena Pinchuk)
- Key people: Olexandr Bogutskiy

History
- Launched: December 17, 2022

Links
- Website: www.ictv.ua/ictv2

Availability

Terrestrial
- Zeonbud: MX-2 (20)

"ICTV2" ("International Commercial Television and Radio Company") is a Ukrainian TV channel, part of the Starlight Media group. It launched in December 2022, replacing ICTV Ukraine, which had been an internationally oriented service.

== History ==
On December 15, 2022, the National Council of Television and Radio Broadcasting of Ukraine reissued the license for ICTV Ukraine, which had been an international channel with programs from ICTV until February 2022, when it began broadcasting the United News service on a non-stop basis. The new license changed the service's name to ICTV2 and shifted its content to series, shows and full-length films. Rebranding took place on December 17.

On December 22 of the same year, the National Council issued a temporary permission for the broadcasting of "ICTV2" during the period of martial law in Ukraine for broadcasting in the multiplex MX-2 of the digital broadcast network DVB-T2. The channel started broadcasting on the network the next day, December 23.
