= OCE TV =

OCE
- Country: Ukraine
- Broadcast area: Nationwide
- Headquarters: Kyiv, Ukraine

Programming
- Language: Ukrainian
- Picture format: 16:9 (576i, HDTV)

Ownership
- Owner: Starlight Media (TOV Hmarochos-Media)

History
- Launched: September 1, 2017

Links
- Website: oce-tv.tv

OCE TV (Ukrainian: ОЦЕ ТБ), branded as OCE (ОЦЕ) is a TV entertainment network that broadcasts reruns of STB, Novyi Kanal and ICTV, as well as international series. It was created by Starlight Media in 2017 as a result of the closure of QTV.

== History ==
The channel capacity was first used in 2008 by the STB team as QTV (originally Kuy-TV), Ukraine's first teen channel. Over time, the channel gradually shifted its demographic, becoming a children's channel in its last months on air. Taking into account the fact that, as QTV, in its final months there was skepticism from advertisers refusing to show their commercials in children's programs, as well as the channel's narrowing to the 4-11 demographic, a decision was taken in the summer of 2017 to create a new channel, OCE TV, that would have a new schedule, replacing acquired cartoons with reruns of content from the Starlight Media archives, drawn in from its three general channels. The amount of airtime for Ukrainian content was stipulated to be eighteen hours a day, as per the August 2017 license ruling; the channel's launch was announced on 17 August and opened on 1 September.

In its launch year, each day had a specific programming theme.

On 13 January 2020, OCE, alongside other Starlight Media channels, converted to high definition.

From 24 to 27 February 2022, in the early days of the Russian invasion of Ukraine, the channel carried the United News Marathon all day. Regular programming was restored on 28 February.

On 23 March 2023, the National Radio and Television Council of Ukraine gave the channel a temporary license to transmit on the digital terrestrial MX-2 multiplex during martial law; such broadcasts began on 31 March. On 23 November, it won the bid for a full license to operate on that multiplex. On 11 January 2024, the Council revoked the temporary license given in March 2023.
