= ICTV (Ukraine) =

- Country: Ukraine
- Headquarters: Kyiv, Ukraine

Programming
- Picture format: 1080i (HDTV) (downscaled to 576i for SDTV)

Ownership
- Owner: Starlight Media Group (Victor Pinchuk & Olena Pinchuk)
- Key people: Olexandr Bogutskiy
- Sister channels: ICTV2; Novy; STB; OCE; M1; M2

History
- Launched: 15 June 1992; 34 years ago

Links
- Website: www.ictv.ua

Availability

Terrestrial
- Zeonbud: MX-1 (5)

ICTV (fully titled International Commercial Television) is a privately held TV channel in Ukraine. Its coverage area allows it to be received by 56.6% of the Ukrainian population, making the channel the fourth in the nation in terms of coverage (trailing the state-controlled Pershyi and privately held Inter and 1+1), and third (well ahead of Pershyi) by the viewers' ratings.

The channel is owned by several business structures connected to the Ukrainian businessman Viktor Pinchuk. It first went on-air on 15 June 1992, and since 1995, it has broadcast 24 hours a day.

On 11 November 2009, the network became a part of Starlight Media, a media holding company which also includes TV channels Novyi Kanal, STB, OTse TV, M1, and M2. Related to the annexation of Crimea by the Russian Federation ICTV broadcasts in Sevastopol ended on 9 March 2014, 14:30 o'clock East European time.

On 13 January 2020, ICTV started broadcasting in HD format. Due to Russia's invasion of Ukraine, the channel has been broadcasting the United News marathon around the clock since 24 February 2022. There is no advertising on the air.

== Criticism ==
Since 2014, ICTV channel was criticised for broadcasting Russian serials. According to the results of monitoring made by "Boycott Russian Films" campaign activists in September, this channel was broadcasting 7 hours and 40 minutes of Russian content per day. At the end of month, the part of Russian origin content took 43% of all broadcasting time. Also, according to activists, ICTV shows almost the biggest amount of serials about Russian law enforcement and army.

== Original programs ==
- The Freedom of Speech
- Facts
- Facts of the Week
- Facts of the Week: 100 minutes

== Programming ==
- Friends
- Bones
- House
- Nash Bridges
- Tru Calling
- Pacific Blue
- V.I.P.
- The Invisible Man
- Night Man
- Dog
- Nyuhach

== Films ==
- The Matrix
- Shallow Hal
- X-Men
- The Powerpuff Girls Movie
- The Day After Tomorrow
- Office Space
- Wayne's World

== Satellite Television ==
- Satellite: Amos (4.0°W)
- ID: ICTV SD
- Standard: DVB-S
- Frequency: 11140
- Personal: Horizontal
- Speed: 30000
- FEC: 3/4
- Image: MPEG-4
- Audio: MPEG L-2
- Code: FTA
- Satellite: Amos (4.0°W)
- Standard: DVB-S
- ID: ICTV SD
- Frequency: 11175
- Personal: Horizontal
- Speed: 30000
- FEC: 3/4
- Image: MPEG-4
- Audio: MPEG L-2
- Code: FTA
- Satellite: Amos (4.0°W)
- ID: ICTV HD
- Standard: DVB-S
- Frequency: 12297
- Personal: Horizontal
- Speed: 45000
- FEC: 3/4
- Image: MPEG-4
- Audio: MPEG L-2
- Code: FTA
