= M2 (Ukraine) =

- Country: Ukraine
- Broadcast area: Ukraine
- Headquarters: Kyiv, Ukraine

Programming
- Language: Ukrainian
- Picture format: 1080i (HDTV) (downscaled to 576i for SDTV)

Ownership
- Owner: Starlight Media
- Sister channels: M1; ICTV; STB; Novyi Kanal

History
- Launched: 23 June 2007

Links
- Website: m2.tv

Availability

Terrestrial
- DVB-T: MX-4 (25)

M2 is a Ukrainian music television channel. It belongs to media holding company Starlight Media, which also comprises ICTV, STB, Novyi Kanal, M1 and QTV.

The channel began broadcasting in 2007. On 1 November 2014, together with M1, it began broadcasting in widescreen (16:9), and since 1 May 2015 has broadcast only Ukrainian music and products.

The channel broadcasts round-the-clock music videos of Ukrainian artists in Ukrainian, English, Russian and other languages. About 75% of the musical content is in Ukrainian. The channel's main content is music videos, as well as in-house produced entertainment, news and music programs.

== See also ==
- List of Ukrainian-language television channels
