= FC Phoenix Kharkiv =

Futsal club Phoenix
- Founded: 2015
- Coach: Serhii Hrytsenko, Yurii Vashchenko
- League: Cup of Ukraine U-14
- Website: fc-phoenix.team
Home colours

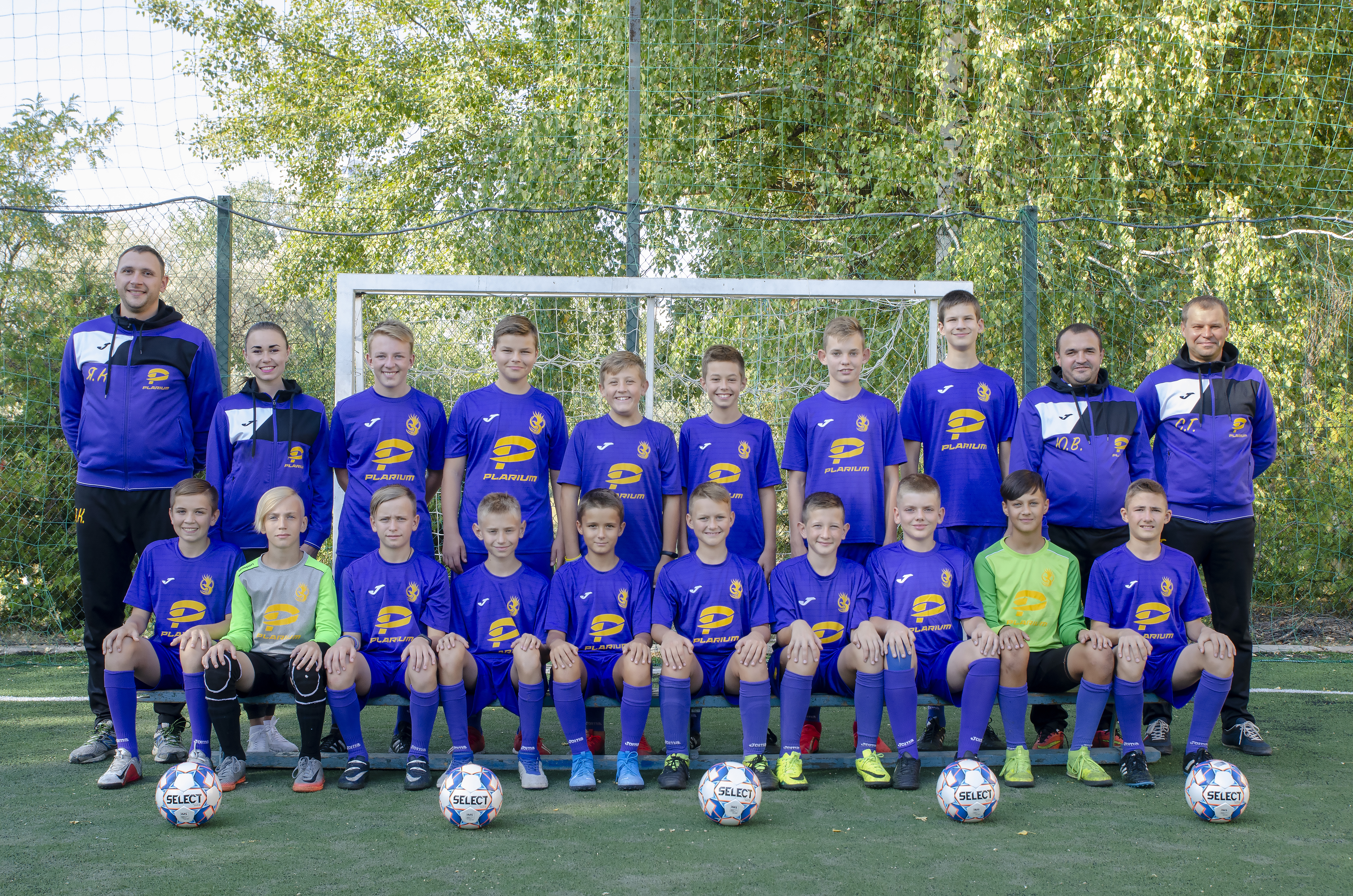
FC Phoenix, 2019

Phoenix (Ukrainian: «Фенікс») — a children’s futsal club from Kharkiv, Ukraine, founded in 2015. The team began as an experimental project for children classed as having little sporting talent, who were never selected for the starting squads of the teams that represented their sport schools. In 2019 Phoenix qualified for the final part of the Futsal Championship of Ukraine, where it took fourth place, and earned a name for itself in the national sporting community. In 2020 Phoenix won the Under 14s Cup of Ukraine.

== Creation of the team ==
The Phoenix experiment began on 8 November 2015 in Kharkiv. It took a different approach from the one normally taken in schools, where players are chosen on the basis of a thorough selection process, because Phoenix was created by parents whose children didn’t make the starting squads of their teams. Using a new methodology, and with the support of the company Plarium Ukraine, the children were offered training from professional coaches who were experts in track-and-field athletics, gymnastics, and swimming. The former futsal players Serhii Hrytsenko and Yurii Vashchenko (Monolith FC) became lead coaches — their work with Phoenix was the first time either of them had taken on a coaching role. The project was unique in Ukraine. It aimed to find out what children from the subs bench could actually achieve if they were given proper training and development opportunities.

The ‘unpromising children’ of Phoenix suffered big defeats in their first few games. Despite this, the coaches were tasked with training them to get good results, and they were told they couldn’t bringing in reinforcements from anywhere else. A psychologist was also brought in to work with the young players, separately from the coaches. The people behind the Phoenix project were trying to model it on a professional sports club, but building it around children who had dropped out of normal children’s sport. They came up with the motto ‘Anyone can be a Hero’.

Just a year and a half later, Phoenix gained its first prize at regional level — the Kharkiv Cup. Two weeks before that game, the team won a tournament dedicated to the memory of the famous sports journalist Boris Lanevskyi. The following season, the children won the ‘Plarium League’ futsal tournament in Kharkiv. Meanwhile their coaches, Serhii Hrytsenko and Yurii Vashchenko, who had had no coaching experience before their work with Phoenix, qualified as category ‘C’ futsal coaches, and received diplomas from the Football Federation of Ukraine — Ukrainian Association of Football. In 2018, Phoenix took part in local matches, and also in a friendly tournament in Nuremberg in Germany, where they finished in third place. With this result, the team was invited to take part in the international Raiffeisen Cup in Nuremberg.

== Championship and the Cup of Ukraine ==
=== 2018/19 ===
Phoenix qualified for the final stage of the Futsal Championship of Ukraine in futsal, in the U-13 category, in the 2018/19 season. The team took first place in the regional qualifier and in the play-offs, and despite losing its first game, it won against Olimpiya-Dnipro, led by Olexander Yuzik, on aggregate for both games.

Deciding matches, played by the eight best teams, took place in Kherson in March 2019. Phoenix met squads from Ternopil, Odesa and Cherkasy at the group stage. Thanks to a goal scored four seconds before the end of the match against Chorne More, Phoenix qualified for the semi-finals. It lost the semi-final game, and the play-off for third place, but it was a major success for Phoenix to be one of the four best teams in the country. It had performed so well that six of its players were invited to join the combined East Ukraine U-13 squad for the Conference Cup, which took place in the ‘Yunist’ (Zaporizhzhia) Palace of Sport in April 2019.

=== 2019/20 ===
Phoenix … is one of those teams that’s in with a great chance of winning the title “Discovery of the season.”

— The futsal journalist and reporter Artem Terentiev, summing up the results of the 2019/20 season

In the 2019/20 season Phoenix won two friendly tournaments, and received gold medals from the Top League of the Futsal Fair in Lutsk. It also won the international friendly tournament in Hamburg. This team of children born in 2006 finished in third place in the qualifying tournament for the Championship of Ukraine, and fought its way to the final stages of the U-15 Championship that took place in Kherson, where it was placed just seventh in the overall ranking.

Phoenix took part in the futsal Cup of Ukraine for children born in 2006, which took place from 9 to 12 March 2020 in Slobozhanske in the Dnipropetrovsk region. The team finished in first place in the group stage after scoring 10 points in 5 games. In the final, Phoenix met their peers from the Olimpiya-Dnipro team. The score at full time was 1:1, but Phoenix won the penalty shootout 3:1. The Phoenix player Ivan Konkov was named best player of the tournament.

Phoenix — the winner of the Cup of Ukraine 2020

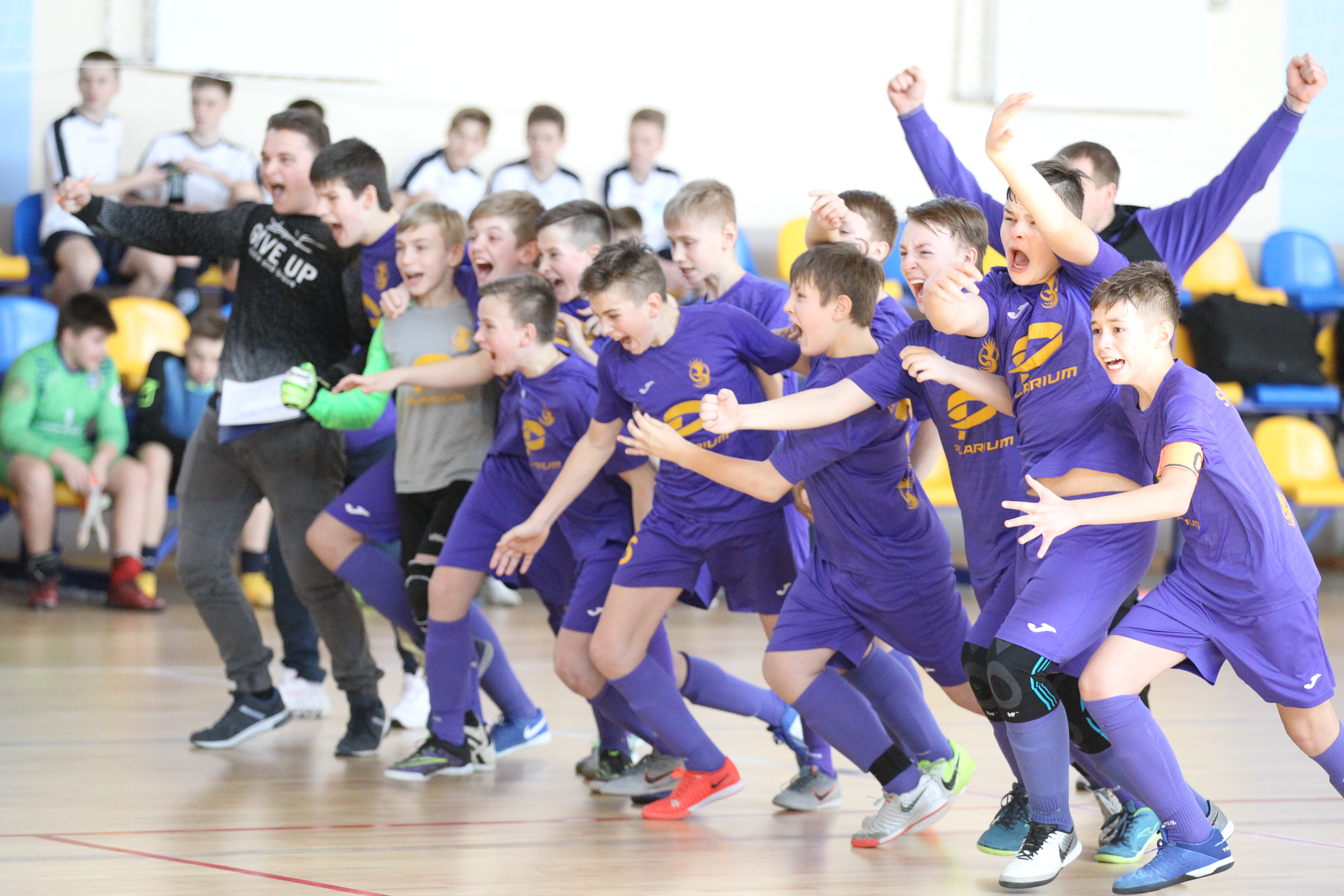

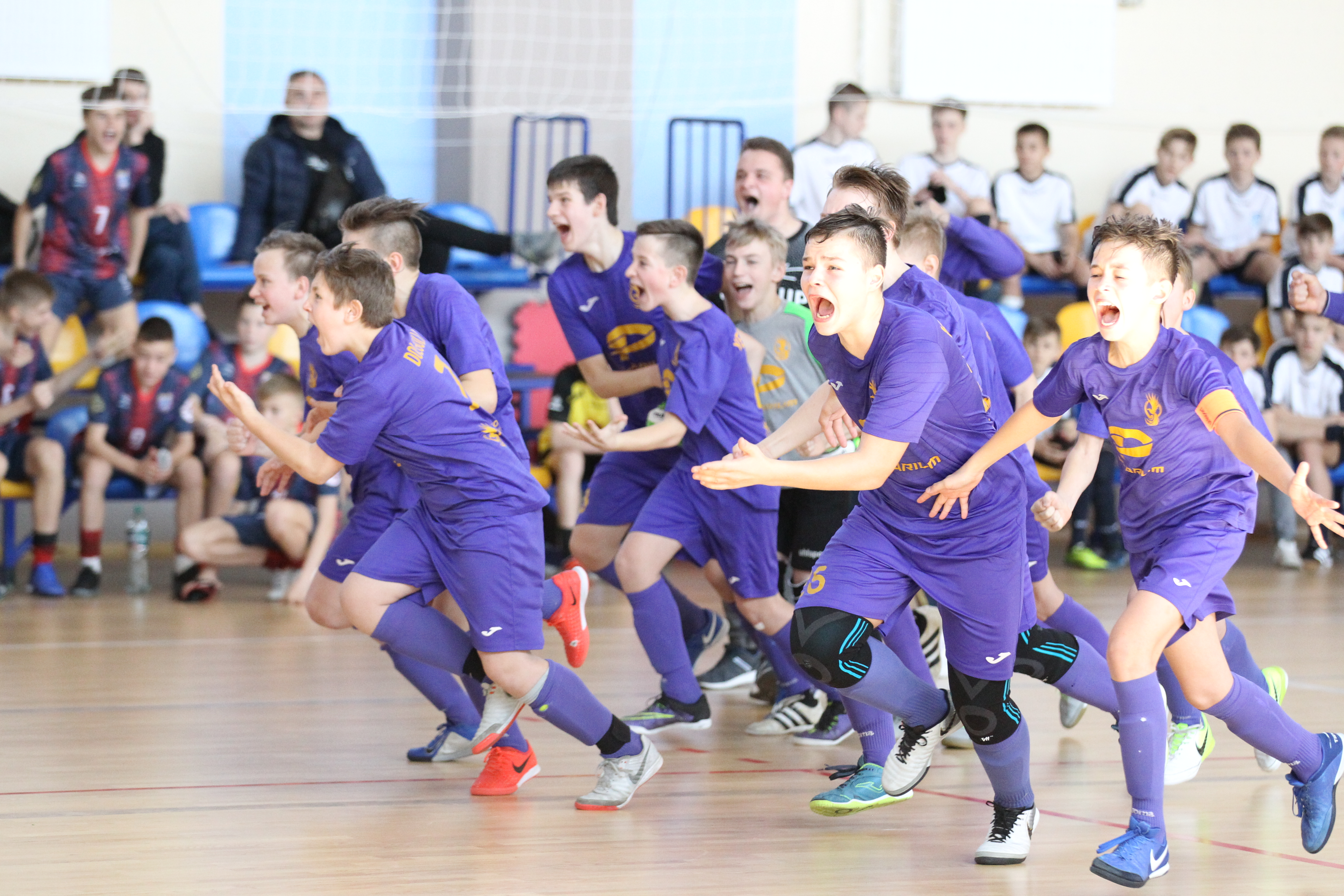

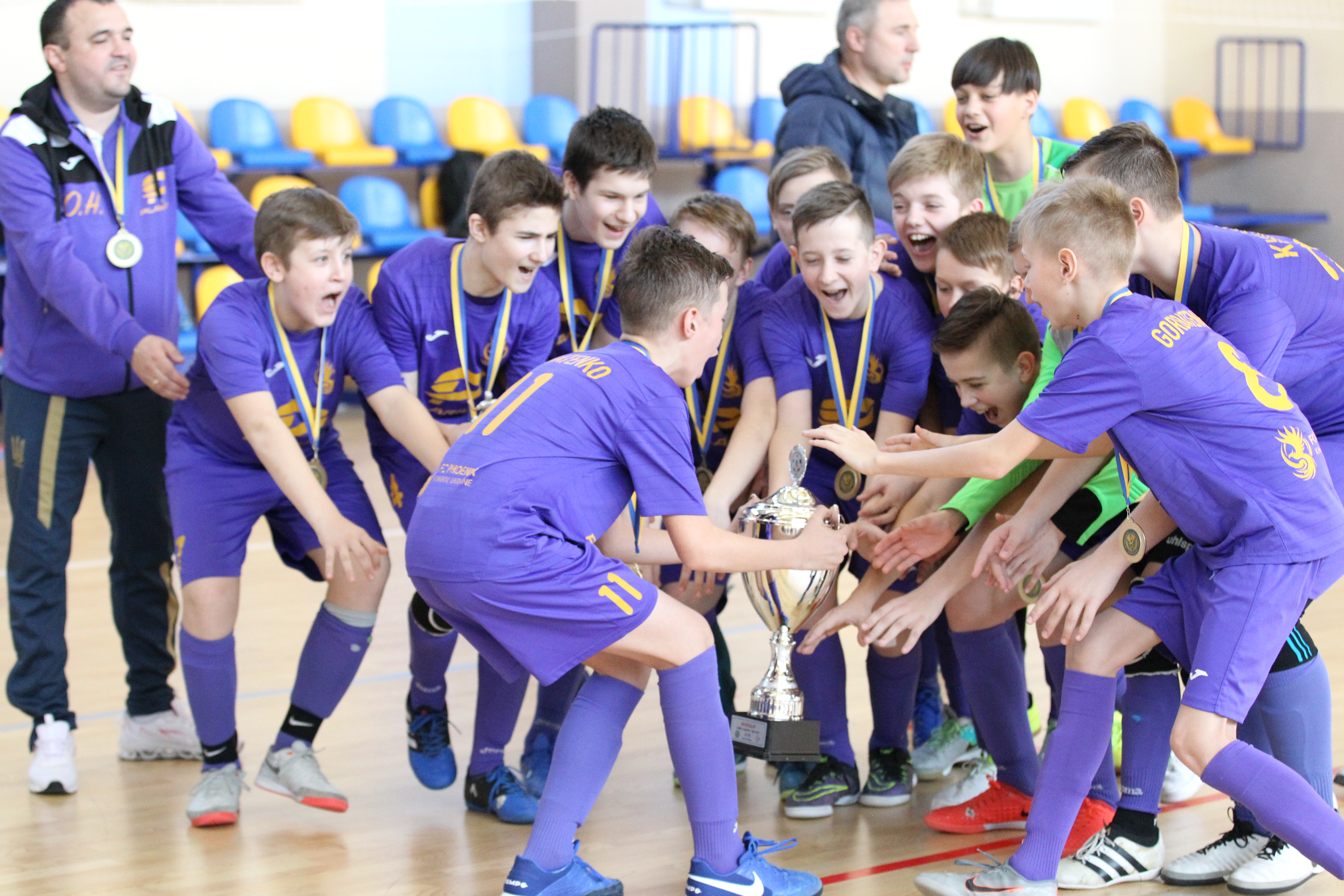

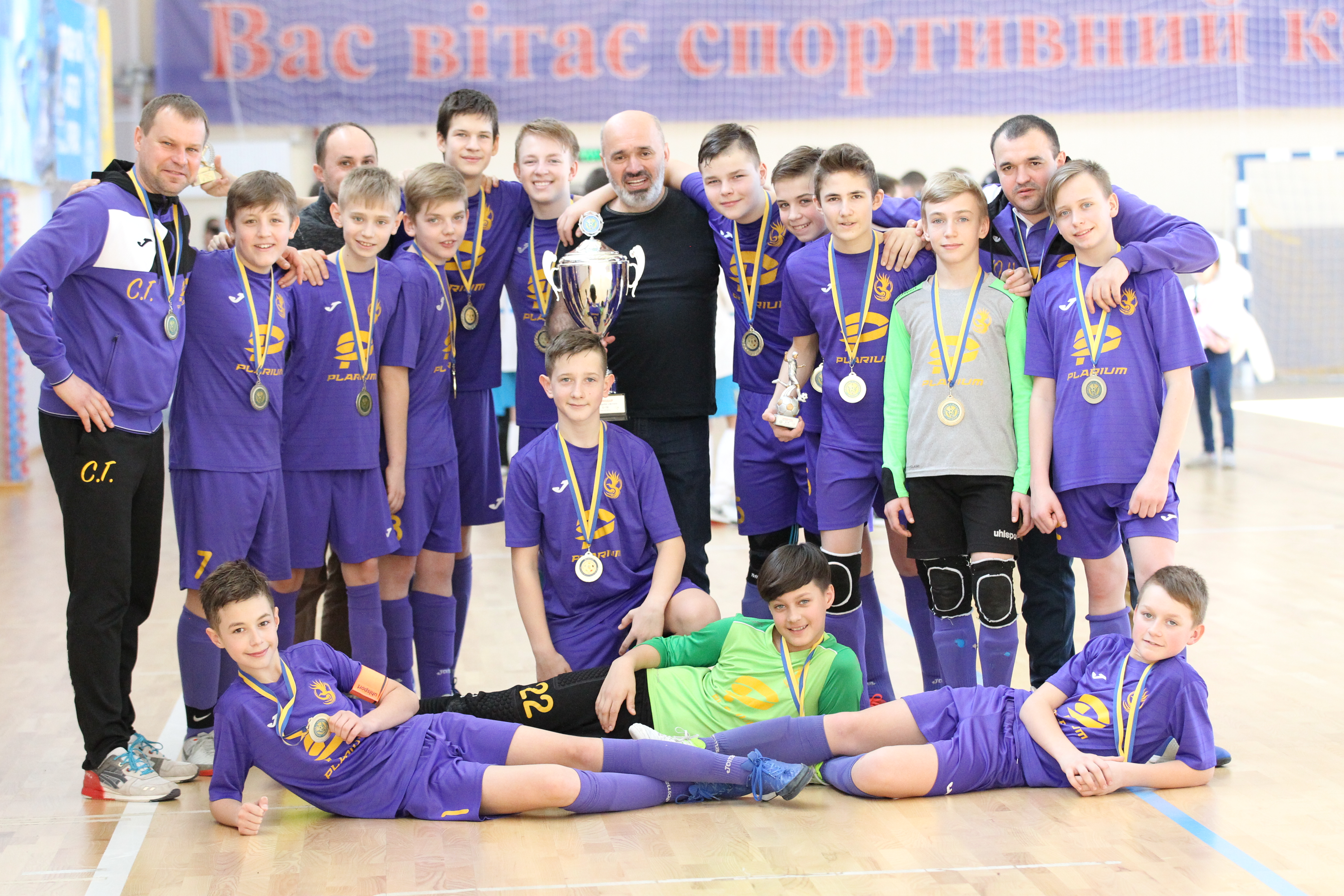

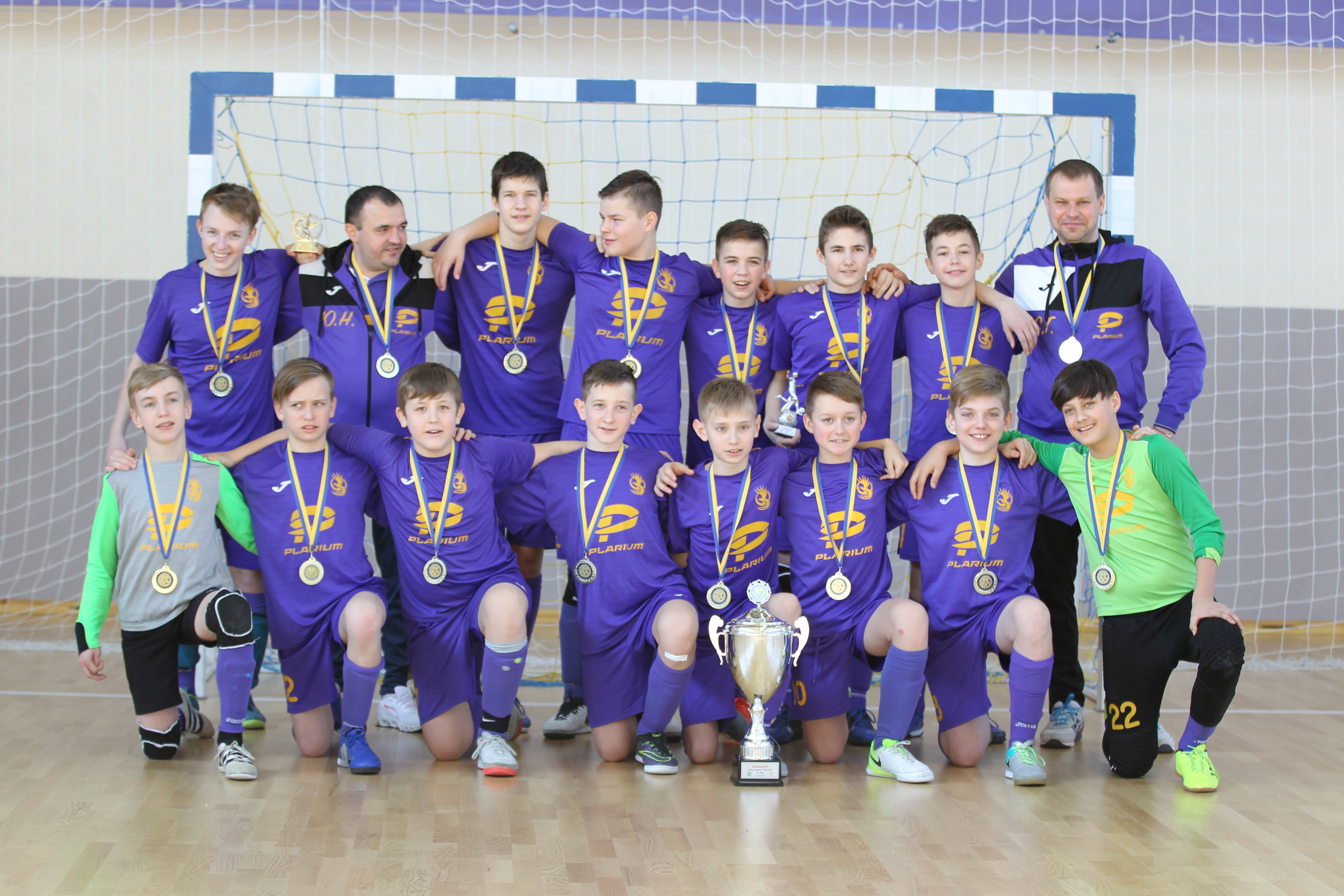

=== 2022/23 and later ===
When the war came to Ukraine, young footballers had to leave Kharkiv for different parts of the country and the rest of the world. However, in a few months they returned to Kharkiv and proceeded with participation in local tournaments.

Since Russia’s full-scale invasion in February 2022, FC Phoenix Kharkiv has sought to provide a sense of stability and normalcy for Ukrainian children through sport. Kharkiv is less than 40 kilometers from the frontline, meaning the northeastern Ukrainian city is constantly subjected to Russian drone and missile strikes. Air raid sirens are also constantly blaring in the city. Despite these safety concerns, FC Phoenix Kharkiv emphasizes community building and a sense of belonging while also being mindful of the constant trauma and danger caused by the war.

— Mark Temnycky, How Ukraine’s Youth Organizations Have Been Impacted By Russia’s War. Forbes.com (Published Mar 10, 2026)

== Public organisation ==
There’s been much interest in Kharkiv and beyond in the Phoenix phenomenon - the successful futsal team made up of "unpromising" children. Channel 9 in Dnipro produced a story on the history of the project. Phoenix players, coaches and parents were also interviewed in the studios of the "UA:Kharkiv" TV channel. The Ukrainian football newspaper "Goal!" reviewed the team’s performance at the Championship of Ukraine. Soon after that the Ukraine-wide TV channel STB aired the story "Never Give Up", about Phoenix.

In just five years since its creation, Phoenix has gone from a team of total amateurs to a futsal club good enough to win the Cup of Ukraine. As well as the team of children born in 2006, Phoenix now has a separate group of young players born in 2013. The public company "Phoenix Centre for Social Youth Innovation" was registered in March 2020.

== Achievements ==
- 2021/22
  - (gold) Futsal Championship of Ukraine (U-16)
  - Futsal Cup of Ukraine (U-16)
  - Futsal Cup of Ukraine (U-17) — runner-up
- 2020/21
  - (silver) Futsal Championship of Ukraine (U-15)
- 2019/20
  - Futsal Cup of Ukraine (U-14)
  - Futsal Championship of Ukraine (U-15) — 7th place
- 2018/19
  - Futsal Championship of Ukraine (U-13) — 4th place

== Video materials ==
- "Phoenix: a history of one team". youtube.com.
- "Phoenix - winner of Futsal Cup of Ukraine U14!". youtube.com.
