= Kateryna Mykytiuk =

American journalist, producer, content strategist (born 1990)

- Born: Kateryna Mykytiuk; November 19, 1990 (age 34); Lviv, Ukraine
- Occupation(s): journalist, producer, content strategist, AI content creator

Kateryna Mykytiuk is American journalist, producer, content strategist and AI content creator that performed most notable Ukrainian TV channel STB's site into best country web platform for women. She was among the most prominent showpersons of the biggest Ukrainian channel Inter.

== Early life ==
Kateryna Mykytiuk was born on November 19, 1990, in Lviv, Ukraine. She attended Sheptytsky Gymnasium before moving to Odesa, where she studied at Gymnasium No. 2 and graduated cum laude. At the age of 15, she began working on TV. During this time, she was recognized as one of the youngest journalists to interview Ukrainian Minister of Youth and Sports Yuriy Pavlenko.

After completing high school she moved to Kyiv to study journalism at Taras Shevchenko National University of Kyiv. While studying, she worked at STB (TV channel), maintaining top academic performance, and later earned her master's degree in journalism.

Her parents, Valentyna Mykytiuk and Serhiy Mykytiuk, were both doctors who met while studying at Vinnytsia Medical University. Her mother died in 2015.

== Career ==
=== Journalism and television ===
Mykytiuk started her career as a journalist covering culture and entertainment. By the age of 19, she became an international journalist for STB TV Channel (Starlight Media), where she conducted interviews with musicians, actors, and public figures. She worked as a press secretary for Eurovision-winning singer Jamala and contributed to publications such as Viva!.

In 2012 she co-created "Vse Bude Dobre", a popular Ukrainian television show that ran for 12 seasons and was adapted in five countries. The show received multiple television awards and maintained high ratings.

== Digital media ==
In 2013 Mykytiuk transitioned into digital media, becoming Head of Internet Projects at STB TV Channel, where she developed digital content strategies for The X-Factor, The Bachelor, Master Chef, Ukraine's Got Talent, and other top-rated shows. Under her leadership, STB's website became the No. 1 female-oriented digital platform in Ukraine.

After relocating to the United States, she collaborated with Hollywood producers and media companies, helping them adapt their content strategies for international audiences. She managed creative content projects for Little Blue Dragon, Warner Bros., Younk Music Label, and Helptimize, Crocs developing AI-driven marketing and content strategies.

=== AI content and education ===
In 2023 Mykytiuk launched AlmightyContent, an educational platform focusing on AI-assisted content creation, including video production, photography, and digital branding. She has been a speaker at industry conferences and developed a methodology for AI-powered content production.

=== The Flowers ===
Mykytiuk is the founder of The Flowers, a luxury floral service catering to high-profile clients in Malibu and Calabasas. Her company has provided floral arrangements for celebrities, including members of the Kardashian family, Barbra Streisand, and Victoria's Secret models.

== Publications ==
Mykytiuk has written for several publications, including Marie Claire, MMR, Tochka.net, and VC.ru.

She was a co-author of the academic book Media Communications and Social Problems (2012), published by Taras Shevchenko National University of Kyiv, Institute of Journalism.

She is author of the non-fiction book Almighty Content: Create Inspiring Content with AI: The Ultimate Handbook for AI Photoshoots, ChatGPT, Midjourney, HeyGen, and 50+ Game-Changing Tools.

== Awards ==
- Top-11 Most Successful Ukrainian Women (2015)
- Incentive Prize (Young Journalist), Innovative Intellect of Ukraine (2008)
- Second Prize (Social Projects), Innovative Intellect of Ukraine (2008)
- Best TV Host – 2nd Prize, InterSchool (Inter TV Channel, 2009)
