= Vitalii Hlahola =

Ukrainian journalist, TV presenter and media expert

Vitaliy Glagola
- Віталій Ярославович Глагола
- Born: 12 September 1989 (age 36); Uzhhorod, Ukrainian SSR, Soviet Union
- Education: Kyiv National University of Trade and Economics
- Occupations: Journalist, television presenter, media expert, city council member
- Office: Member of Uzhhorod City Council

Vitaliy Glagola (Ukrainian: Віталій Ярославович Глагола; born 12 September 1989) is a Ukrainian journalist, television presenter, and media expert. He has worked for Novyi Kanal and STB and currently runs his own news Telegram channel. Since 2020, he has served as a member of the VIII convocation of the Uzhhorod City Council.

== Early life and education ==
- In 2006, he graduated from the Multidisciplinary Lyceum "Leader" in Uzhhorod.
- In 2015, he earned a degree in Finance and Credit from the Kyiv National University of Trade and Economics.

== Career ==
From 2008 to 2009, Glagola worked as a correspondent and senior editor at the Transcarpathian Regional State Television and Radio Company "Tysa‑1" in Uzhhorod. In 2009–2010, he was a correspondent for Media International Group in Kyiv.

His most significant tenure was at Novyi Kanal in Kyiv from 2010 to 2018, where he served as a correspondent for the program "Reporter" and as a journalist and presenter of "Abzats". In 2018–2019, he worked as a correspondent for the program "Vikna" on STB. He has been featured several times in the "Top 100 Most Influential People of Transcarpathia" ranking by Ungvar.INFO in 2024.

Since 2019, he has managed the Telegram channel ‘Vitalii Hlahola (official)’ [@vglagola], one of the most influential regional and national Telegram news sources, focusing on exposing corruption schemes, smuggling, abuses of power, and reporting on emergencies.

== Political career ==
In 2020, Glagola was elected to the VIII convocation of the Uzhhorod City Council representing the party Native Transcarpathia ("Рідне Закарпаття").

== Civic activities ==
Glagola participates in various media forums and conferences, delivering master classes and lectures on journalism and advocating for transparency, objectivity, and media independence.

He is also active in volunteer work with the Serhiy Prytula Foundation's "Infernal Cars" project, delivering over 400 vehicles from Europe to Ukraine for the military.

Glagola regularly covers issues of mobilization, illegal border crossings by conscripts, and the activities of law enforcement, judiciary, and customs, publishing exclusive documents and multimedia materials from his sources.
