= Khto zverkhu? =

- Presented by: Serhiy Prytula (1–11); Olexandr Pedan ("Mr. Judge") (1–); Olha Freimut (1–2); Ekaterina Varnava (3–6); Lesia Nikitiuk (7–); Bogdan Sheludyak (12–13); Volodymyr Dantes (14–)
- Country of origin: Ukraine
- Original languages: Ukrainian; Russian
- No. of seasons: 14

Original release
- Network: Novyi Kanal
- Release: March 10, 2012 – present

Khto zverkhu? (Ukrainian: Хто зверху?; English: Who's on Top?) is the Ukrainian game show and entertainment television program, which airs on the Novyi Kanal every Thursday since its debut on March 10, 2012. The program is the Ukrainian adaptation of the series Battle of the Sexes.

== Show rules ==
The show involves 2 teams - male and female. To win, women will have to ask themselves: what do they know about the male world and how are men treated to this? Men, in turn, should do the same for women.

The duel of male and female worlds is divided into rounds consisting of blank polls, various contests and competitive games. In addition, topics that men and women do not raise in the presence of each other are discussed. The show consists of 7 competitions (accumulation of money). The winner is determined in the final, the 8th round, where the winner's money is doubled.

== TV presenter ==
The leaders of the 1-3 seasons were Olha Freimut and Serhiy Prytula. In the 3 season Olha Freimut was replaced by Ekaterina Varnava. There is also a "gentleman judge" speaking in the voice of Olexandr Pedan. In the 7th season, Lesia Nikitiuk replaced Ekaterina Varnava.

TV presenter	Season									
TV presenter	1	2	3	4	5	6	7	8	9	10
Serhiy Prytula										
Olexandr Pedan	Judge									
Olha Freimut										
Ekaterina Varnava										
Lesia Nikitiuk										

== Ratings ==
The share of the 1 season of the show was 11.28% (14–49, a sample of "50 thousand+), and 8.84% according to the sample "All Ukraine."
