= Ekaterina Varnava =

Russian actress, television host, comedian and choreographer

Ekaterina Vladimirovna Varnava (born 9 December 1984, Moscow, USSR) is a Russian theatre, film, television and voice actress, television presenter, comedian and choreographer. She is best known as a participant and choreographer of the comedy television show Comedy Woman (2008–2020).

== Biography ==
Ekaterina Varnava was born on 9 December 1984 in Moscow. Her father, Vladimir Petrovich Varnava, was a military officer; her mother, Galina Stepanovna Varnava, was a physician. She has two older brothers, Igor and Alexey.

Soon after her birth the family moved to East Germany, where her father was stationed as part of the Group of Soviet Forces in Germany. She lived in Wünsdorf until the age of seven.

She graduated from the Humanities Department of the National University of Science and Technology MISiS with a degree in jurisprudence.

== Career ==
=== KVN ===
Varnava began performing in the KVN comedy competition in 2003 with the team "Svoi Sekrety" ("Our Secrets"). In 2004 she first appeared on television as an invited participant with the "Small Nations Team" during the musical contest of the Premier League quarterfinals.

Beginning with the 2005 Premier League festival she joined the "Small Nations Team" as a full participant. The team reached the final of the 2005 season and also appeared at the "Golosyashchiy KiViN 2005" festival. At the same time she continued performing with "Svoi Sekrety" in the Ukrainian Higher League, reaching the semifinals.

After participating in the 2006 Sochi festival the "Small Nations Team" was invited to the KVN Higher League, though it was eliminated in the first round. In 2006 Varnava also became champion of the Volga League with "Svoi Sekrety".

After 2007 the "Small Nations Team" effectively disbanded and Varnava performed exclusively with "Svoi Sekrety." The team was invited to the 2007 Higher League season and later moved to the Premier League. Varnava and Maria Kravchenko were central performers of the team. Her final KVN performance took place in 2008 as part of the Moscow national team.

She also appeared several times on the KVN spin-off program Vne Igry ("Out of the Game") and co-hosted episode No. 15 with Aleksandr Maslyakov Jr. and Maria Kravchenko.

=== Television ===
From its debut episode in 2008, Varnava performed on the television show Comedy Woman as the show's “sex symbol,” and also worked as the show's choreographer.

She co-hosted the morning program NTV Utrom on NTV (August–September 2012) and was among the hosts of the music competition Battle of Choirs on Russia-1.

From 2014 to 2017 she hosted the Ukrainian program Who’s on Top? on Novyi Kanal, replacing Olha Freimut, until she was banned from entering Ukraine due to visiting Crimea. In 2019 the Ministry of Culture of Ukraine added her to a list of individuals considered a threat to national security.

She hosted the First Channel project Dance! (2015), appeared in the music video for “Lada Sedan” by Rekord Orkestr, and participated in many other entertainment programs. In 2018 she became co-host of Songs. Reality on TNT, and in 2020 co-hosted Boys & Girls on Friday! with Aleksandr Gudkov. Since 2020 she has co-hosted the TNT show Sekret with Dmitry Khrustalyov.

=== Theatre ===
According to journalist Alyona Zhigalova, Varnava was dismissed from the Crave theatre due to her stance on the Russian invasion of Ukraine.

Her performance fee for corporate events in 2025 was reported as 2.5 million rubles.

From 2020 to 2022 she starred in the cabaret show Absolutely Naked at Crave Theatre.

In 2024 she premiered the cabaret show DRAMA QUEEN in Cyprus, serving as lead actress, producer and director.

== Filmography ==
- 2008 – Univer – cameo
- 2012 – 8 First Dates – Ilona Viktorovna
- 2012 – Deffchonki – cameo
- 2013 – Studio 17 – Mila
- 2015 – SashaTanya – cameo
- 2015 – Double Trouble – Alexandra
- 2017 – Zomboiashchik – Elena Dronova
- 2020 – The Marathon of Wishes – Snezhana
- 2021 – Love – Violetta
- 2022 – Oryol i Reshka. Kino – Valeria Repina
- 2022 – Trigger 2 – Zhenya
- 2022 – Incident in Multi-Pulti Land – Donkey (voice)
- 2022 – Winter Season – Ilza
- 2023 – Fandorin. Azazel – Strievskaya
- 2023 – What Men Talk About. Simple Pleasures – cameo
- 2023 – Reckless – Vika

=== Voice acting ===
- 2017 – Sadko – Barracuda (voice)
- 2019 – The Secret Life of Pets 2 – Daisy (Russian dub)

=== Music videos ===
- Vitaliy Kozlovskiy — “Trachu” (2015)
- Rekord Orkestr — “Lada Sedan” (2015)
- Artur Pirozhkov — “Lyubov’” (2015)
- TSOY — “Poltora Koreytsa” (2019)
- Klava Koka — “Vlyublena v MDK” (2019)
- Aleksandr Gudkov — “Tektonik” (2019)
- Manizha — “Nedoslavyanka” (2019)
- Philipp Kirkorov — “Romany” (2020)
- Loboda feat. Pharaoh — “Boom Boom” (2020)
- Little Big — “Moustache” (2021)
- Cream Soda — “Podozhgu” (2021)

=== Advertising ===
In 2013 she appeared in the advertising campaign for the online shoe store Sapato.ru. In 2016 she appeared in commercials for Gloria Jeans. Since 2017 she has been a brand ambassador for Loko Bank.

=== Magazines ===
She appeared in the April 2010 issue of the Russian edition of Maxim and on the cover of XXL in November 2012.

== Personal life ==
From 2012 to 2013 Varnava dated comedian Dmitry Khrustalyov.

From 2013 to 2019 she was in a relationship with choreographer Konstantin Myakinkov.

In 2020 she began a relationship with actor and director Aleksandr Molochnikov. The couple married in spring 2022 and divorced later that year.

== Public stance ==
Since May 2017 she has been listed in the Ukrainian database Myrotvorets.

In February 2022 she publicly opposed the Russian invasion of Ukraine.
