= ANTIAIDS Foundation =

Ukrainian foundation concerning AIDS epidemic

Elena Pinchuk ANTIAIDS Foundation
- Formation: September 2003; 23 years ago
- Founder: Elena Pinchuk
- Type: Charity
- Location: Ukraine
- Website: www.antiaids.org/eng.html
- Formerly called: Elena Franchuk ANTIAIDS Foundation

The Elena Pinchuk ANTIAIDS Foundation is the first and only charity foundation in Ukraine that is privately funded. The main aim of the Foundation is to control the HIV/AIDS epidemic in Ukraine.

== History ==
The foundation was established in September 2003 by Elena Franchuk, the daughter of Leonid Kuchma, the second post-Soviet Ukrainian President. In 2010, the Foundation changed its name to the Elena Pinchuk Foundation, as Elena Franchuk divorced her first husband, Igor Franchuk, and married Viktor Pinchuk (in 1997). In 2010, Elena Pinchuk entered the UNAIDS High Level Commission on HIV Prevention. In 2011, the Foundation launched a competition to develop social media and mobile phone projects for HIV prevention.

In October 2022, the Elena Pinchuk Foundation, together with the NGO Hryhoriy Skovoroda Institute for Process Oriented Work in Ukraine, announced the launch of the Regeneration project to train specialists to provide psychological support to war-affected Ukrainian women.

== Programs and projects ==
- Awareness media campaigns intended to attract attitude of Ukrainians towards the HIV/AIDS problem. The first campaign started in November 2003, where up to 30 PSAs were made and shown on the national TV channels.
- Direct help to people living with HIV/AIDS.
- Wide scale campaigns to attract international leaders and stars attention to HIV problem in Ukraine. This has included a visit to Kyiv by the 42nd President of the US, Bill Clinton, along with charity concerts by Elton John and Queen + Paul Rodgers.
- Partnership with international and Ukrainian organizations. Elena Pinchuk Foundation has been in partnership with the Clinton Foundation since 2004, and the Elton John AIDS Foundation since 2007.

On October 18, 2010, Victor and Elena Pinchuk received the "Enduring Vision" award from Elton John AIDS Foundation for their contribution to the fight against HIV/AIDS.
