= Russia's War Crimes House =

Russia's War Crimes House in Davos, formerly Russia House is building 68, Promenade in Davos. It was a platform for promoting Russian initiatives. Then, during the World Economic Forum in 2021, it held an exhibition on Ukrainian civilian war deaths. It was rented by Victor Pinchuk.

== History ==
As Russia House, the building had been used by the Russian delegation to the World Economic Forum in Davos for three years. Per the Russia House, in 2018 there more than 1,000 guests and participants from 60 countries, in 2019 there were 1,500 from 70, and in 2020 there were more than 2,000 from 85.

The building was to be used by the Russian delegation to the World Economic Forum in 2022, but Russia was disinvited and not attending. The building was then taken over by a nonprofit to provide this exhibition.

A press conference on May 23 included several speakers, mostly not in English.

The photography in the exhibit is one of a number of efforts to memorialize aspects of the Russo-Ukrainian war, in "the tradition of depicting war through art", as noted by Vandana Kalra in Indian Express. Another is "Captured House", an exhibition of new artistic works addressing the conflict by Ukrainian artists that opened at the beginning of August in Brussels, and which had already been presented in Berlin, Rome and Amsterdam. Another initiative is in New York City, where at the Fridman Gallery "some of Ukraine’s leading women artists are sharing the experience of war." An exhibition titled "Beast of War, Bird of Hope" is hosted by the Aspen Institute in Colorado, "featuring Ukrainian paintings and photography created in response to the war." In Kherson, in Ukraine, there is now a "Residency in Occupation" program creating artworks depicting the horrors of living in a war-torn country.

Another is the "Crucified Ukraine" exhibit in Kyiv at a World War II memorial museum. A visitor with children there stated "“It is necessary to explain to our children what is happening in Ukraine now .... We cannot speak with our children as if nothing is happening, because they clearly understand everything, and they see what happens in our country."

Kalra listed the Russia War Crimes House exhibit in May in this context: "Ukrainian artists put together an anti-war exhibition at Russia House comprising photographs depicting war crimes, from the severely injured to razed buildings.
