= Oleksiy Mustafin =

Ukrainian journalist (born 1971)

- Олексій Мустафін
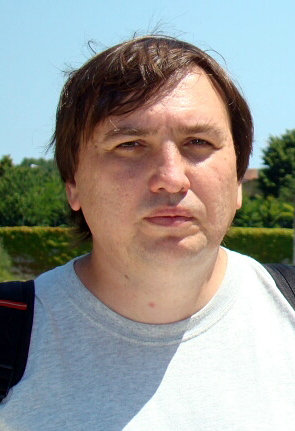
- Born: May 23, 1971 (age 55); Kyiv, Ukrainian SSR, Soviet Union (now Ukraine)
- Education: Kyiv Pedagogical University
- Occupations: Media manager, journalist, politician
- Years active: 1993–present
- Employer(s): UNIAN-weekly, Post-Postup, Den newspapers, 1+1 TV channel, Inter TV channel, STB TV channel
- Organization: STB TV channel
- Title: Chief Editor
- Term: January 2006–present

Oleksiy Mustafin (Ukrainian: Олексій Мустафін; born 23 May 1971) is a Ukrainian media-manager, journalist, and politician.

Born in Kyiv, in the Ukrainian SSR of the Soviet Union (in present-day Ukraine), Mustafin graduated from the Kyiv Pedagogical University, which he attended from 1988 to 1993.

Since 1993, Mustafin has been working as journalist of the UNIAN-weekly, Post-Postup and Den newspapers. From 1994 to 1997 he was a reporter on the weekly television show “Pislyamova” where he was also editor-in-chief and anchor from 2003 to 2004. Other media activities include head of the world news department for 1+1 TV channel in 1997, and deputy-chief and chief-editor positions for Inter TV channel from 1998 to 2001. Since January 2006 Mustafin has been chief–editor for STB TV channel.
