= Who Is Against Blondes? =

Ukrainian TV game show

- Also known as: Khto proty blondynok?
- Genre: Intellectual game
- Presented by: Andriy Domanskij (season 1), Sergey Pisarenko (season 2), Lesya Nikitjuk (2018-2020, new format)
- Country of origin: Ukraine
- Original languages: Ukrainian, Russian
- No. of seasons: 3

Original release
- Network: Novyi Kanal
- Release: 28 August 2018 – 2 June 2020

Who is against Blondes? (Ukrainian: Хто проти блондинок?) is a Ukrainian television game show broadcast on Novyi Kanal. It is an adaptation of the Dutch game show Beat the Blondes. The show aired two seasons in 2010 and 2011, before being revived in 2018.

== Rules of the game ==
In the game, one main player, usually a man, is involved. As its rivals stand 50 blondes — 49 mediocre and 1 TOP blonde. Each of the blondes responded to the questions prepared by the program before the game.

Then the girls are divided into 8 rows, 7 participants in 7 rows and 1 blond girl who heads the girls. For each defeated girl the main player is given a certain amount of money - in the first row ₴100, in the second 200 and so up to 7 — 700. For the victory over the top blonde earned in the course of the game budget doubles.

=== Round 1 ===
The main player to choose from is ten themes. Before each question forward one number of blondes goes.

The player chooses a theme and he is given one of the questions that was before the game is given to the blondes. There are four answers to each question. If the player answered correctly, the wrong answer answered, the blonde left the game, and answered correctly pass to the second round and the player for each knocked blonde on the score is credited ₴100 on the first question (and blondes of the first row), ₴200 on the second and so on. On the seventh question, every one who threw out the blonde brings the player ₴700. On the eighth question, if the player answered correctly, and the main blonde is not, then the player's personal account doubles.

The player can switch to the second round only if there are no more than 25 blondes left in the game.

=== Round 2 ===
The player is given a choice of three questions, initially with no options. The player chooses one of them and the blondes write their answer on sheets of paper. Then answers are given and the player can answer. If he answers incorrectly, then his choice on the following issues is reduced to one; If the player answered correctly, he begins to "clean" the blondes by choosing one of them. If she answered incorrectly, she leaves the game, and the player continues to "clean", if he answered correctly - the game continues, the player is offered the choice of the following questions.

The player can answer incorrectly twice, the third game will end and the entire budget will be divided between rivals.

In 2018, InstaQuestion was introduced. That is, the question is put on the official page of the channel Novyi Kanal in Instagram, responding to it, the girls will also see options for answers.

== History ==
The Ukrainian adaptation of the Dutch show Beat the Blondes was first produced in 2010. The first season of the show was held by Andriy Domansky, the second Sergey Pisarenko. The show was then cancelled.

In 2018, the project was revived, and its leader was Lesya Nikitjuk the first girl leading this format, acting on the side of blondes.
