= Ihor Franchuk =

Ukrainian politician (born 1968)

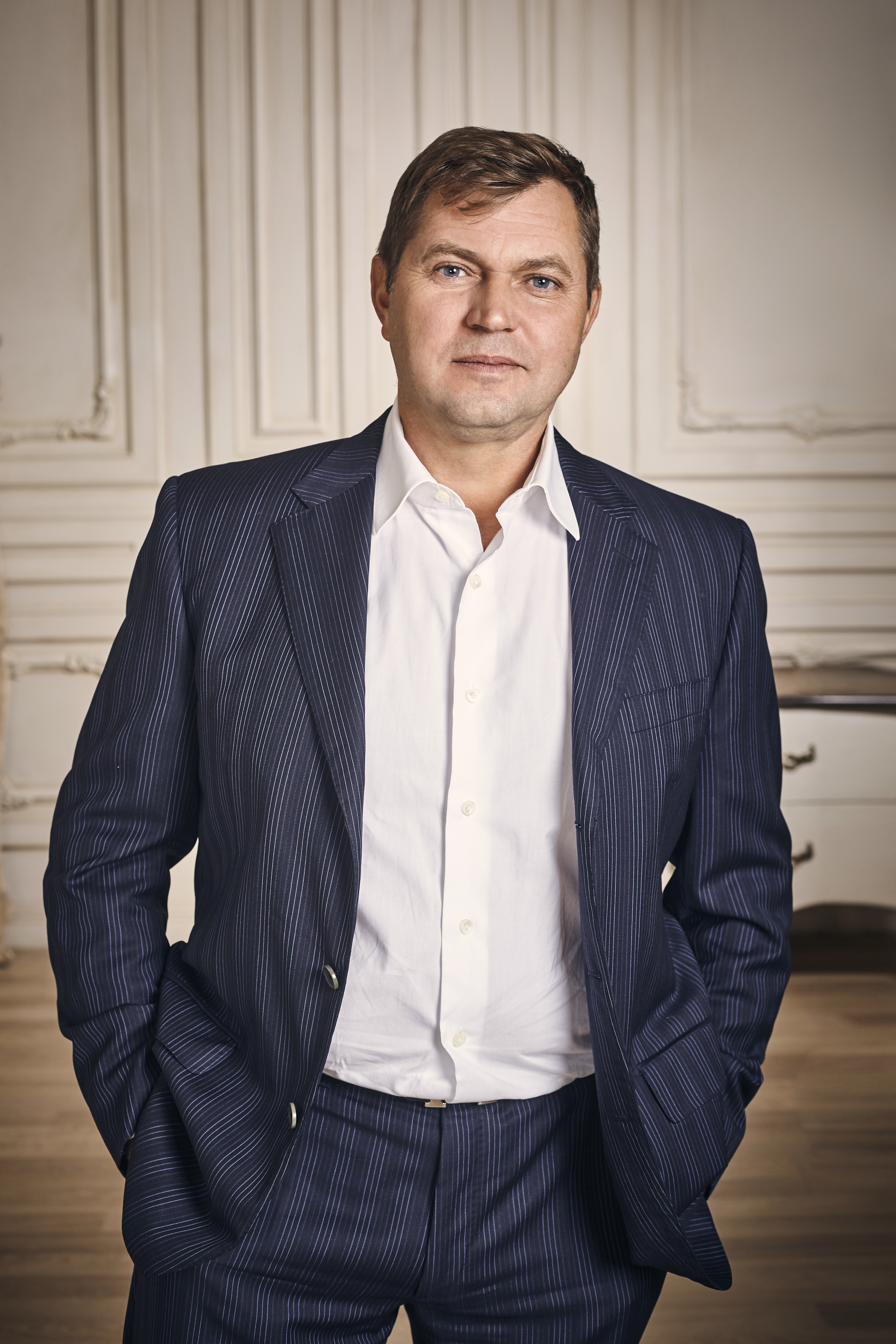
2020 portrait.

Ihor Anatolievich Franchuk (Ukrainian: Ігор Анатолійович Франчук; born July 6, 1968) is a Ukrainian businessman, People's Democratic Party politician and former People's Deputy of Ukraine. He is the son of former prime minister of Crimea Anatoliy Franchuk.

== Biography ==
He was born on July 6, 1968 in Krasnoyarsk, Krasnodar Krai. Has a sister, Irina. From 1985-1989, he was a cadet of the Riga Higher Military Political School of the Strategic Missile Forces after which he served in the Armed Forces of the Soviet Union until 1991. He graduated from the Plekhanov Russian University of Economics a year later. From 1994—2006, he was a People's Deputy of Ukraine of the 2nd, 3rd and 4th convocations, as well as Deputy Chairman of the Verkhovna Rada of Ukraine Committee on Fuel and Energy Complex, Nuclear Policy and Nuclear Safety. Since November 2020, he has been an advisor to the Vice Prime Minister of Ukraine on a voluntary basis as well as Vice President of the Ukrainian Union of Industrialists and Entrepreneurs.

== Family ==
His first wife was Olena Pinchuk (until 1997). Second wife Tetyana Franchuk. His third wife (since 2009) is Julia Polska, founder of Royal Group, France. He has four sons: Roman (1991), Aleksandr (1999), Yaroslav (2001), Ihor (2017) and two daughters: Elizaveta (2010) and Kateryna (2012).
