= Victoria Bonya =

Russian beauty influencer (born 1979)

- Виктория Боня
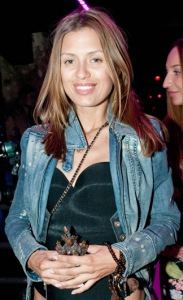
- Born: 27 November 1979 (age 46); Krasnokamensk, Russian SFSR, Soviet Union
- Education: Moscow State University of Food Production; Ostankino Institute of Television and Radio Broadcasting
- Occupations: Model, blogger, media personality, social activist

Victoria Anatolyevna Bonya (Russian: Виктория Анатольевна Боня; born 27 November 1979) is a Russian beauty influencer, model, and media personality. In 2026, she spoke out against the allegedly sluggish response to floods in Dagestan, accused the government of cruelly mismanaging cattle culls in Siberia, and criticised the tightening restrictions on online social networks, among other issues.

== Biography ==
After moving to Moscow, Bonya embarked on a modelling career. After becoming a prize‑winner in the Beauty of Russia pageant, she represented Russia in 2001 at the Miss Earth international beauty contest, held in the Philippines.

She graduated from the Moscow State University of Food Production (now the Russian Biotechnological University) with a degree in accounting. In 2004, she completed the Ostankino Institute of Television and Radio Broadcasting, qualifying as a television and radio journalist.

In 2006, she began working on national television. She gained widespread fame through her participation in the reality show Dom-2. She has appeared in several films and television shows, as well as in music videos of Russian pop stars, including Timati, Dima Bilan, Mitya Fomin, MakSim, and Egor Kreed.

Victoria Bonya was mentioned in the 2018 Russian comedy film What Men Talk About. Continuation as an example of someone famous for being famous.

== Personal life ==
In 2009, Bonya had a romance with FC Spartak Moscow forward Welliton, who proposed to her on the very first day, though she took it as a joke. According to Bonya, Spartak's head coach, Valery Karpin, was against their relationship, as he spoke negatively about her and meddled excessively in Welliton's private life.

For several years, she cohabited with Alexander Smurfit, the son of Irish millionaire Sir Michael Smurfit, whom she met in Moscow in 2010. On 17 March 2012, their daughter, Angelina Letitia Smurfit, was born. Since 2011, she has resided in Cap-d'Ail, right next to Monaco. She rarely visits Moscow, and only for work. The couple separated in 2017 but remained on friendly terms.

== Social activism ==
In 2020, Bonya attracted attention for spreading conspiracy theories about the COVID-19 pandemic, which drew widespread criticism. However, she ultimately decided to abandon her views and publicly announced that she had been vaccinated.

She described the boycott of Russia and Belarus imposed in 2022 as "genocide".

On 13 April 2026, she posted an 18‑minute video on Instagram in which she spoke out against the blocking of Telegram in Russia and against the mismanaged cattle culls in Novosibirsk Oblast, among other issues, prompting reactions from the Russian media and officials, including the Kremlin spokesman, Dmitry Peskov. The video garnered over 10 million views within the first hour, reaching 30 million views after five days. Gennady Zyuganov, leader of the Communist Party, stated that Bonya's message should be taken seriously if the Kremlin wished to avoid a repeat of the 1917 Russian Revolution.

== Hobbies ==
Bonya is passionate about mountaineering and expedition climbing. In September 2022, she took part in an expedition to Manaslu in the Himalayas led by Nirmal Purja. The climb was cut short due to severe weather and avalanches. Several climbers lost their lives during the attempt. In January 2023, she joined an expedition to the Ojos del Salado volcano. On 28 August 2024, she summited Mont Blanc du Tacul. On 25 September 2024, she reached the summit of Manaslu. On 19 May 2025, she conquered the world’s highest peak, Mount Everest.

== Filmography ==
- Univer (2010) as Polina Romanova / Oxana Zozulya (16 episodes)
- 8 First Dates (2012) as a wedding planner
- Cinderella (2012) as herself
- Maximum Impact (2017) as a girl by the pool at the cigar club
