= Lesia Nikitiuk =

Ukrainian TV presenter

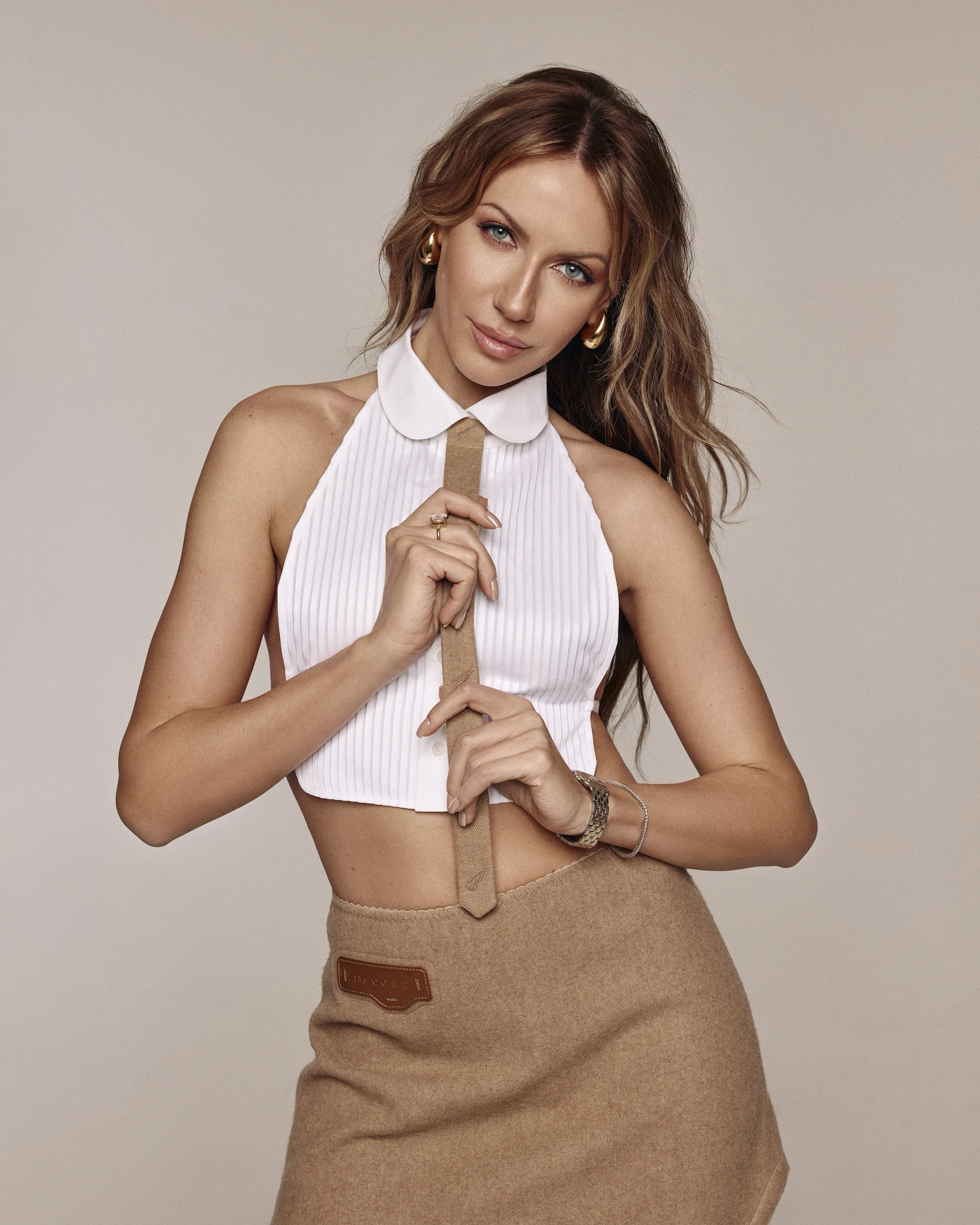
- Lesia Nikitiuk in 2023
- Born: 19 October 1987 (age 38); Khmelnytskyi, Ukrainian SSR, Soviet Union (now Ukraine)
- Occupations: TV presenter, show woman, comedian
- Years active: 2009 — present

Lesia Ivanivna Nikitiuk (Ukrainian: Нікітюк Леся Іванівна; born 19 October 1987) is a Ukrainian TV presenter.

== Biography ==
Nikitiuk was born in Khmelnytskyi, Ukraine on 19 October 1987. Her mother is Kateryna Petrivna Nikitiuk and father is Ivan Ivanovich Nikitiuk, workers of "Ukrelectroapparat." After graduating from the school she received higher education at Khmelnytskyi Humanitarian Pedagogical Academy. During the training, she was a member of the KVN "Tornado Lux" team. The production of "Halia, I'm on the bus" has collected more than 4.2 million views on YouTube.

In 2009, with a close friend, Olga Panasenko began to perform in the "Curling show". Two years later, the two took part in the show Rozsmishi komika. They managed to impress humourists and earn ₴50,000, and then another ₴20,000. In the Russian programme "Rozsmishi komika" they earned ₽250,000.

From 2012 to 2013, was the host of TV show Oryol i Reshka.

In 2013, she hosted on the channel K1 the so-called author's program about the show-business "Lesia-Zdiesya".

On 8 February 2015, the 10th season of the Oryol i Reshka show began, in which Lesia Nikitiuk participated along with other colleagues on the show. On 17 August 2015, the second part of the "jubilee" season "Oryol i Reshka" came out on the air, where Lesia resumed hosting.

In 2015, Lesia Nikitiuk, together with Andrey Bednyakov, Regina Todorenko and Zhanna Badoeva, starred in the video Svetlana Loboda "Пора домой".

In 2015, Nikitiuk was nominated for the main Television Prize of the country "Teletriumf" as a leading entertainment program.

On December 10, 2015, Nikitiuk went on a round-the-world trip along with the TV program Oryol i Reshka.

On September 18, 2016, Nikitiuk was the presenter of "Navkolo M" project, where she is looking for the best men from around the world.

In February 2018, she became TV presenter of the new TV show Hto zverhu? on Novyi Kanal (co-hosting with Serhiy Prytula), and in August, became the host of resumed intellectual show Who is against blondes? on the same channel.

In 2018, she became a participant of the show Tantsi z zirkamy.

== Filmography ==
=== Cinema ===
Year	Name	Role
2018	Hotel Transylvania 3: Summer Vacation	Erica (Ukrainian dubbing)
2025	Pesyky	Yana

=== TV ===
Year	Name	Role	TV channel	Notes
2009	Show biodiques	herself (comedian)	ТЕТ	Duet "Malinka" (with Olga Panasenko)
2011—2012	Rozsmishi komika	herself (participant)	Inter	Duet "Malinka" (with Olga Panasenko)
2012—2013	Oryol i Reshka	herself (TV presenter)	Inter	
2013	Rassmeshi komika (Russia)	herself (party)	1+1	Duet "Malinka" (with Olga Panasenko)
2013	Lesia-Zdesya	herself (TV presenter)	К1	
2013	Rozsmishi komika	Herself (participant)	1+1	Duet "Malinka" (with Olga Panasenko)
2015—2017	Oryol i Reshka	Herself (TV presenter)	Inter	
2016	Navkolo M	herself (TV presenter)	Inter	
2018	Battle of the Sexes	herself (TV presenter)	Novyi Kanal	
2018	Tantsi z zirkamy	herself (participant)	1+1	
2018	Who is against blondes?	Herself (TV presenter)	Novyi Kanal	
TBA	Lip Sync Battle	Herself (TV presenter)	1+1	
2023	єПитання (Family Feud)	Herself (TV presenter)	Novyi Kanal	

== Awards and nominations ==
Year	Awards	Nomination	Work	Result
2015	«Teletriumf»	The best TV host of the entertainment program	«Oryol i Reshka»	Nominated
2018	«Viva! Naykrasivіші»	the most beautiful woman of Ukraine		Nominated
2018	«Person of the Year»	New generation of the year		Nominated
2018	«Ball of flowers»	The best TV presenter of the year		Won
2018	«Teletriumf»	The best TV live entertainment program in the lifestyle format	«Navkolo M» (release Paris)	Nominated
2018	«СOSMOPOLITAN AWARDS»	The best TV presenter of the year		Won
