= 8 First Dates =

2012 film by David Dodson and Aleksandr Malyarevsky

- Theatrical release poster
- Directed by: David Dodson; Aleksandr Malyarevsky
- Written by: Mikhail Savin; Yuri Kostiuk; Dmitry Grigorenko; Yuri Mikulenko; Timofey Saenko; Volodymyr Zelenskyy; Boris Shefir; Sergey Shefir; Andrey Yakovlev
- Produced by: Ekaterina Gordetskaya; Volodymyr Zelenskyy; Andrey Radko; Sergey Shefir; Boris Shefir
- Starring: Oksana Akinshina; Volodymyr Zelenskyy; Denis Nikiforov; Ekaterina Varnava
- Cinematography: Bruce Allan Green
- Edited by: David Dodson
- Music by: Bryan Carr
- Production companies: Central Partnership; Kvartal 95 Studio; Production Center GORAD
- Release date: March 8, 2012 (Russia)
- Running time: 83 minutes
- Countries: Russia; Ukraine
- Language: Russian
- Budget: $2.3 million
- Box office: $7,456,577

8 First Dates (Russian: «8 первых свиданий», romanized: 8 pervykh svidaniy; Ukrainian: «8 перших побачень», romanized: 8 pershykh pobachen') is a 2012 Russian-Ukrainian romantic comedy film directed by David Dodson and Aleksandr Malyarevsky. It stars Oksana Akinshina and Volodymyr Zelenskyy alongside Denis Nikiforov and Ekaterina Varnava.

== Plot ==
Vera and Nikita don't know each other, but they have one thing in common: they both chose the same venue to celebrate their personal successes. Vera is a successful TV presenter with her own talk show, and she is engaged to Konstantin, a famous tennis player. Nikita is a highly sought-after vet who has proposed to Ilona, a plastic surgeon. Everything is going well for them: they are happy, and their friends support their choices. However, one morning, Vera and Nikita wake up in the same bed, and everything changes. Assuming that this must be the result of a wild night, they run off in different directions, hoping to forget it all as a bad dream.

But the next morning, they wake up in the same bed in the same house, despite each of them being certain that they fell asleep at home. This continues for several more days. Some mysterious force keeps bringing them together, ruining their privacy and perhaps suggesting that they are destined to be together.

== Cast ==
- Oksana Akinshina as Vera Kazantseva
- Volodymyr Zelenskyy as Nikita Sokolov
- Denis Nikiforov as Konstantin
- Ekaterina Varnava as Ilona
- Olesya Zheleznyak as Zinaida Ivanovna, manager
- Yevhen Koshovyi as taxi driver
- Svetlana Khodchenkova as passenger in a taxi
- Victor Vasilyev as Alexey
- Soso Pavliashvili as cameo (singer at the festival)
- Gorod 312 as cameo
- Kostya Nakonechny as Kolya
- Igor Jijikine as Kolya's father
- Yelena Kondulainen as Vera's mother
- Victoria Bonya as wedding planner

== Awards ==
In 2013, the film received the Russian National Movie Awards as the Best Russian Comedy of the Year.

== 2020 ban ==
In 2020, 8 First Dates was banned by the Ukrainian State Film Agency because one of its actresses, Ekaterina Varnava, visited Crimea during the Russian occupation to attend a comedy show in 2016. She was then blacklisted for five years.
