= Mark T. Williams =

American risk management scholar (born 1963)

- Boston University Questrom School of Business
- Born: August 19, 1963 (age 63)

Mark Thomas Williams (born August 19, 1963) is an academic, financial author and risk management expert. He is a faculty member in the Finance Department at Boston University Questrom School of Business where he teaches courses in banking, capital markets and FinTech. In 2018, he was awarded the James E. Freeman Lecturer in Management Chair.

== Career ==
After graduating from University of Delaware, he became a bank trust officer for Wilmington Trust Company and moved to TD Banknorth in 1987. In 1997 he joined Citizens Power LLC, a Boston-based energy trading company and became a senior vice president, Head of Global Risk Management. Since 2002, he has been on the faculty of Boston University as a Master Lecturer.

Williams is a member of the Standard & Poor’s Academic Council, a senior advisor at the Brattle Group and is on the advisory board of Appleton Partners, a Boston-based private wealth management firm. He is also the co-founder of FitMoney, a nonprofit focused on elevating financial literacy in U.S. public schools for kindergarten through 12th grade K-12. In 2018, he was elected to the Board of Trustees for Lesley University located in Cambridge, Massachusetts. In 2020, prior to President Biden's election, he served on his economic policy subcommittee. In 2023, he also served as President of the Boston Economic Club.

Williams is a guest contributor for the Financial Times, Fortune Magazine, Reuters, Forbes.com, and Business Insider. He has also written articles for Bloomberg, the Boston Globe, Foreign Policy magazine and The New York Times.

== Current research interests ==
In 2019, Williams completed a performance study on Major League Baseball Umpire's pitch-call accuracy over 11 seasons (2008-2018) concluding that over 20% of certain pitches were called incorrectly. For the 2018 season, home plate umpires made 34,294 incorrect pitch calls. Error rates remained similar for the 2019 season. In October 2019, he launched Umpscores, an umpire performance evaluation app. This research and findings have helped fuel movement towards “Robo Umps” in MLB and the use of technology assisted umpiring behind Homeplate.

In 2015, he co-authored a report with Harry Markopolos, the Bernie Madoff whistleblower about the potential fraud and growing financial risks associated with the MBTA pension.

== Bitcoin testimony ==
On January 29, 2014, he provided risk testimony before the New York State Department of Financial Services hearing on virtual currencies. In the NYSDFS testimony, he stated "as a virtual commodity, Bitcoin remains extremely risky and needs to be closely watched. To transform Bitcoin into a virtual currency would require regulation, centralization, creation of a legal framework and strong regulatory oversight." According to him, these steps would alone not guarantee Bitcoin's chronically high volatility to drop low enough to allow it to become a trusted transactional currency. He raised concerns about Bitcoin, including lack of consumer protection, it being a high-risk virtual commodity, having an artificially inflated price, extreme hoarding, hyped demand, high potential for market manipulation, and fraud.

On April 2, 2014, Williams provided congressional testimony before the U.S. House of Representatives Committee on Small Business discussing the 10 major risks associated with Bitcoin. He was a speaker at the World Bank Law, Justice and Development (LJD) Week October 2014 where he discussed virtual currencies and the regulatory and legal challenges of new peer-to-peer technologies in financial services.

== Bitcoin price volatility ==
During Congressional Testimony, Williams stated bitcoin was 7 times more risky than gold, 8 times more risky than the S&P 500, and 15 times more risky than the U.S. dollar.

In December 2013, after Bitcoin peaked at $1,200, Williams forecasted that it was in a bubble and would trade for less than 10 dollars, an over 90% drop by mid-2014. In 2014, Bitcoin prices dropped by over 70% to $344 but never reach $10. In January 2018, Williams further cautioned investors about the cryptocurrency hyper asset bubble, stating it is fraught with uncertainty and high risk. Prices can also be manipulated, and exchanges that trade them tend to have little to no regulation and consumer protections.

== Awards ==
- Beckwith Prize for Excellence in Teaching - Boston University, 2008 and 2021
- New England Book Show Best Reference Book of 2013, New England Book Show, 2014
- James E. Freeman Lecturer Chair awarded, 2018
- Hall of Fame Inductee, Sussex Central High School, 2019

== Publications ==
- Williams, Mark T. Uncontrolled Risk: The Lessons of Lehman Brothers and How Systemic Risk Can Still Bring Down the World Financial System. New York: McGraw-Hill, 2010. Chinese Version Published McGraw Hill, 2014.
- Lawson, R. Alan; Williams, Mark T. (2013). Longwood Covered Courts and the rise of American tennis. Newton, Massachusetts: Longwood Covered Courts. ASIN B01M1N6UV3.
