= Starlight Media =

Ukrainian television production company

- Type: Conglomerate
- Industry: Mass media
- Founded: November 11, 2009; 16 years ago
- Founder: Viktor Pinchuk
- Headquarters: Kyiv, Ukraine
- Area served: Worldwide, primarily in Ukraine
- Key people: Olena Pinchuk (Chair); Michael Tsarev (CEO)
- Products: Television, broadcasting, film equipment rental, scenery production, new media, movies, entertainment, TV shows, advertisement production, video production, digital media, news production
- Website: www.starlightmedia.ua

Starlight Media (stylised starlight.media, previously StarLightMedia) is the largest Ukrainian broadcasting group, composed of six television stations and nine other media and advertising companies. It was founded 11 November 2009 in Kyiv. In 2013 its market share was 30.17% (GfK Ukraine research, panel 50K+) and in 2014 - 27.85% of the 14-49 audience (Nielsen research, panel 50K+). Its market share in 2012 was 34% for the audience aged 14–49 and in 2014 - 32% (GfK Ukraine research, panel 50K+). In 2015 the group's share of the audience of 14-49 year olds was 27.33% (50K+, Nielsen's television audience research). Its margin over its closest competitor is 46%, and for middle and upper income Ukrainians — 54%.

In 2013, StarLightMedia launched wGRP Investment, in which the group invests its airtime in prospective brands and get its return on investment from the sales growth due to the advertising. In 2014, the holding implemented about 10 partnerships on this model, including the pharmaceutical company Omnipharma and FMCG company Karpatskie Mineralnie Vody.

== TV stations ==
=== STB ===
STB, a general-interest national TV channel covering 98% of the country, started broadcasting in 1997. In 2015, STB had a share of 10.01% for the 14-49 target audience, and 9.56% of the 18-54 target audience (here and further figures are given for 50K+, Nielsen's television audience research data belongs to TIC, provided by StarLightMedia). In 2013 and 2014 STB was the highest-rated Ukrainian broadcaster with an 11.7% share in 2013 (annual growth was 9%) for the 14-49 audience (GfK Ukraine research, panel 50K+). and 10.17% in 2014 (Nielsen research, panel 50K+). In 2012 the core audience of STB consisted of women 20–50 years old, and its share in 2012 for this target group was 13.39% (GfK Ukraine research, panel 50K+).

STB's key projects are

- The X-Factor
- MasterChef
- Ukrayina maye talant – Ukraine's Got Talent
- Kholostyak — The Bachelor
- Tantsiuyut vsi!– Everybody Dance!
- Zvazheni ta Shchaslyvi — The Biggest Loser
- Kulinarna Dynastiya — Cooking Dynasty
- Khata na Tata — House for Father
- Kokhana my vbyvaiemo ditei — Honey, We're Killing the Kids
- Vahitna u 16 — 16 and Pregnant
- Vse bude dobre — "Everything Will Be Alright"
- Ya soromlius svoho tila — Embarrassing Bodies
- Vikna-Novyny — Windows News

In autumn 2012, 100 percent of STB prime time was filled with shows produced by the station.

The CEO of STB is Michail Tsarev.

=== ICTV ===
ICTV, a general-interest national TV channel (covering 95% of the country’s territory), started broadcasting in 1992. Its core audience consists of male viewers 25–45 and its share in 2012 for this target group was 11.17%, in 2013 - 11.4% (GfK Ukraine research, panel 50K+), and in 2014, 7.79% (Nielsen research, panel 50K+). ICTV’s share in 2015 was 9.82% for channel’s core target audience M25-55, 50K+ (Nielsen’s television audience research data.)

ICTV’s key shows are daily news "Fakty" (Facts) and "Fakty with Oksana Sokolova", a weekly analytical program. Also the investigative journalism programs *Distalo! (Enough!)

- Secret Front
- Grajdanskaya Oborona
- Nadzvychaini Novyny (Extreme News)
- Antizombie, and
- Svoboda Slova - Freedom Of Speech political talk-show.

Documentaries created by ICTV in 2014-2015

- Revolutsia Gidnosti (Revolution of Dignity)
- Pravyi Sektor, Radykalnyi Syndrom (Right Sector. Radical Syndrome),
- (Ne)pryhovana viina ((Un)masked War)
- Ukraine-2041
- Braterstvo Chervonoho Hresta (Вrotherhood of Red Cross)
- Spetsnaz: Povernutysia Zhyvymy (Special Unit)
- Povertaitesia zhyvymy, dobrovoltsi (Come Back Alive, Volunteers).

Morning show

- Ranok u Velykomy Misti (Morning in the Big City) was launched in 2015.

2015 was called ‘the autumn of big premieres’ on ICTV: there were eight new Ukrainian produced series:

- Slidchi (Investigators)
- Patrul Samooborona (Self-defense Patrol)
- Pes The Dog
- Nikon and Co
- 15
- Viddil 44 (Department 44),
- Kod Konstiantyna (Constantine Code)

Earlier, there were Facty (Facts), Svoboda slova (Free Speech), Krot (Mole), Distalo! (Enough!) It also has strong serial and film content.

The CEO of ICTV is Oleksander Bohytsky.

=== Novy Kanal ===
Novy Kanal is a general interest national broadcaster covering 80% of the country with an urban target audience between 14 and 49. In 2012 and 2013 Novy kanal became the top broadcaster for 14–24 year old TV viewers. Its average share for this audience was 12.52% in 2012 and 13.6% in 2013 (annual growth - 9%)(GfK Ukraine research, panel 50K+). In 2014 the Novy channel share was 7.55% (Nielsen research, panel 50K+). In 2015 for an audience aged 14–35 it had an 11.00% share (according to Nielsen people-metric panel, for people living in cities 50K+).

Novy kanal key projects in 2015 are *Revizor (The Auditor) social reality show

- Khto zverkhu? (Who's on top?) gender game show
- SuperIntuitsiia (SuperIntuition) game show,
- Supermodel po-ukrainsky (Ukrainian Supermodel) reality show,
- romantic dating show Sertsia Trokh (The hearts of Three),
- Abzats! (End of story!) infotainment program
- Proekt Perfekt (Perfect Project)

the first Ukrainian seriality with disable people.

- PoLOVEynky (Halves) romantic reality.

Earlier there were Pedan-Pritula Show, Revizor, and Khto Zverhu?. Shows made by a station’s own idea, format and development prevail at Novy Kanal.

CEO of Novy Kanal is Volodymyr Lokotko.

=== M1 ===
M1 is a music, cinema, fashion

M1 secures a 42% share of Ukrainian music TV stations. "Ukrainian viewers watch music at M1. That’s why we feel special responsibility for the channel content, design and other".

The core audience of M1 are young active fashionistas aged 14–25. This broadcaster's share for this TA in 2012 was 2.14% (GfK Ukraine research, panel 50K+). In 2013 its share was 1.73% for the 14-30 year old target audience (GfK Ukraine research, panel 50K+). In 2014 the M1 channel share was 1.13% for the 14-49 y.o. audience (Nielsen research, panel 50K+).

M1 key channels are Guten Morgen, EmOneNews, tviy format, Blond 007, POPconveyor.

CEO of M1 is Valentyn Koval.

=== M2 ===
M2 until May 2015 was a music for older audience, its share for TA 25–35 years in 2012 was 0,35% (GfK Ukraine research, panel 50K+). In September 2012 M2 changed its air identity and significantly renewed its content. In 2014 the M2 share was 0,21% for audience 14-49 y.o. (Nielsen research, panel 50K+). Since May 1 of 2015, M2 channel has completely changed its format and started to broadcast only those music videos, which involve Ukrainian musicians, songwriters, producers, directors and others in producing process.

CEO of M2 is Valentyn Koval.

=== OCE ===
OCE is a TV entertainment network that broadcasts reruns of STB, Novyi Kanal and ICTV.

== Production studios ==
Starlight Commercial Production makes brands integration in channels' projects from idea creating to graphics. Production house clients list includes international brands Lenovo, Dove, Lipton, Rexona, Pampers, Tefal, etc. Among other Starlight Commercial Production works with augmented reality and 3D-graphics on stage.

Starlight Films produces TV films, serials, commercials, documentary and musical videos. Maksym Litvinov, head of Starlight Films worked as a director of format TV projects on STB (X-Factor, So You Think You Can Dance, Ukraine's Got Talent). Starlight Films created adaptation of ER series, aired on STB from 31 March 2014.

Vavёrka Production produces TV sitcom and other comedy genres for television. In 2014 it produces Koly My Vdoma/When We are at Home sketchcom.

Head of Vavёrka Production is Dmytro Tankovych, TV anchor, producer, and scriptwriter.
