= Comedy Woman =

- Genre: Comedy, sketch show
- Created by: Natalia Eprikyan
- Starring: Dmitry Khrustalyov (episodes 1–128), Natalia Eprikyan (episodes 129–237)
- Country of origin: Russia
- Original language: Russian
- No. of seasons: 9
- No. of episodes: 237

Production
- Producers: Natalia Eprikyan, Arthur Dzhanibekyan, Vyacheslav Dusmukhametov, Semyon Slepakov, Andrey Levin (Seasons 7–9)
- Production location: Moscow
- Production company: Comedy Club Production

Original release
- Network: TNT
- Release: 21 November 2008 – 7 February 2020

Related
- Love Is

Comedy Woman (pronounced “Kámedi Wúmen”; formerly Made in Woman) is a Russian comedy television show produced by Comedy Club Production, which aired on the TNT network. The premiere took place on 21 November 2008.

In December 2019, the project was put on hold, and filming of new episodes was suspended. In May 2020, the closure of the show was announced, which was later confirmed in September.

== History ==
=== Made in Woman (2006–2008) ===
Created by Natalia Eprikyan, Made in Woman was a female comedy cabaret featuring former KVN participants. The show toured Moscow clubs from 2006 to 2008 with rotating casts and live performances.

=== Television show (2008–2020) ===
The pilot aired on 21 November 2008. After four episodes, the show returned on 9 March 2009 under the new title Comedy Woman, with an updated cast. The program combined sketch comedy, songs, dances, and clownish performances.

=== Casting and changes ===
In 2016, the show held a major casting to refresh its cast. New members were gradually introduced, culminating in a new spin-off segment titled Love Is.

== Creators ==
- Creator: Natalia Eprikyan
- Directors: Dmitry Efimovich, Roman Novikov, Kirill Kuzin, Igor Panyushkin, Anatoly Shpulnikov
- Composer: Vitaly Kudrin
- Choreographers: Ekaterina Varnava, Konstantin Myakinkov
- Producers: Natalia Eprikyan, Arthur Dzhanibekyan, Vyacheslav Dusmukhametov, Semyon Slepakov, Andrey Levin

== Controversies ==
In December 2017, a joke by the cast of the show aired on 8 December, in which an Ingush woman was depicted as an escort, sparked a conflict, and shortly afterward the show's creators apologized on social media for the unsuccessful joke. A video was aired in which the hosts and TNT executives apologized to the Ingush people. The channel management demanded that content producers plan their jokes more carefully to avoid having "to apologize to anyone" again.

In 2019, Nikita Mikhalkov criticized a May 2013 episode of the show in which Natalia Medvedeva made a joke about the Soviet Union general and Hero of the Soviet Union D. M. Karbyshev. Medvedeva apologized for her joke about Karbyshev, stating that during the preparation of the sketch, she believed the general's surname was fictional. The general's grandson, Dmitry Karbyshev, filed a complaint with the Investigative Committee of Russia about the show.
