= Olena Pinchuk =

Ukrainian oligarch (born 1970)

- Олена Пінчук
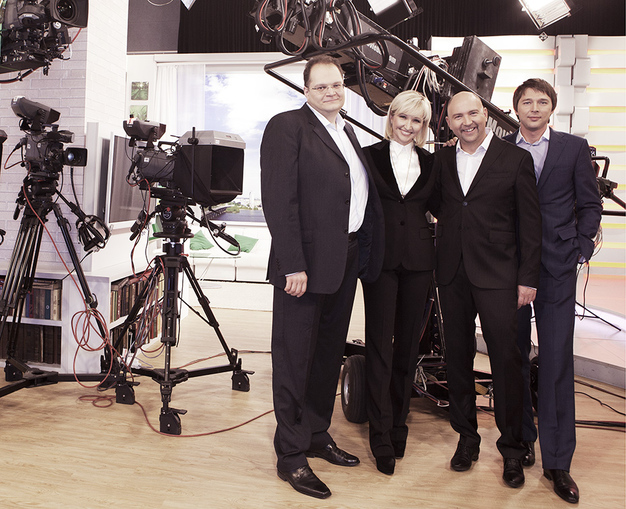
- Olena Pinchuk (second from left) with the management of StarLightMedia, 2012
- Born: Olena Leonidivna Kuchma; 3 December 1970 (age 55); Dnipropetrovsk, Ukrainian SSR, Soviet Union
- Other names: Elena Pinchuk; Yelena Pinchuk
- Education: Dnipropetrovsk National University
- Organization(s): ANTIAIDS Foundation; UNAIDS High Level Commission on HIV Prevention
- Spouses: Ihor Franchuk (div. 1997) Victor Pinchuk (m. 2002)
- Children: 3
- Parents: Leonid Kuchma (father); Lyudmyla Kuchma (mother)
- Website: www.antiaids.org/eng.html/

Olena Kuchma Pinchuk (Ukrainian: Олена Леонідівна Пінчук, romanized: Olena Leonidivna Pinchuk; born 3 December 1970; often written in Russian: Елена Пинчук, romanized: Yelena Pinchuk) is the daughter of former Ukrainian president Leonid Kuchma. Together with her husband Viktor Pinchuk, she owns Ukraine's biggest media group, StarLightMedia and EastOne Group.

== Early life and education ==
Olena Pinchuk was born on 3 December 1970 in Dnipropetrovsk (now known as Dnipro) to former President of Ukraine Leonid Kuchma and Lyudmyla Kuchma. She attended physicotechnical and economics faculties at Dnipropetrovsk National University, and graduated in "Economics and Sociology".

== Career ==
From 1995 to 1996, she worked in department for economics at PrivatBank. From 1997 until 2002, she was the marketing director of Kyivstar.

== Personal life ==
Elena Pinchuk was married to son of Anatoliy Franchuk, Ihor Franchuk, who headed Naftogaz and was an MP in Ukraine up to mid-1997. She has a son with him, Roman, born on 3 April 1991. who attends Brown University

In 2002, she married Viktor Pinchuk, a Ukrainian businessman. They have two daughters, Katerina (born in 2003) and Veronika (2011).

Olena Pinchuk founded the ANTIAIDS Foundation in 2003. According to the Ukrainian magazine Focus, Olena Pinchuk was amongst the "top 10 most influential women" in Ukraine as of 2010. In 2008, she bought a 10-bedroom villa in Upper Phillimore Gardens, Kensington, London for £80 million, at the time the most expensive home in the UK.

== Philanthropy ==
In 2003, she founded ANTIAIDS Foundation, aimed at fighting AIDS epidemic in Ukraine. It is the first and only Ukrainian charity fund that exists thanks to the private funds and donations.

In 2010, she joined the UNAIDS High Level Commission on HIV Prevention.

== Honours ==
- November 2007 - ranked the 17th among 100 most influential Ukrainian women, according to Ukrainian magazine Focus
- December 2012 - 3rd place at the same rating
