= Victor Pinchuk =

Ukrainian politician and oligarch (born 1960)

- Віктор Пінчук
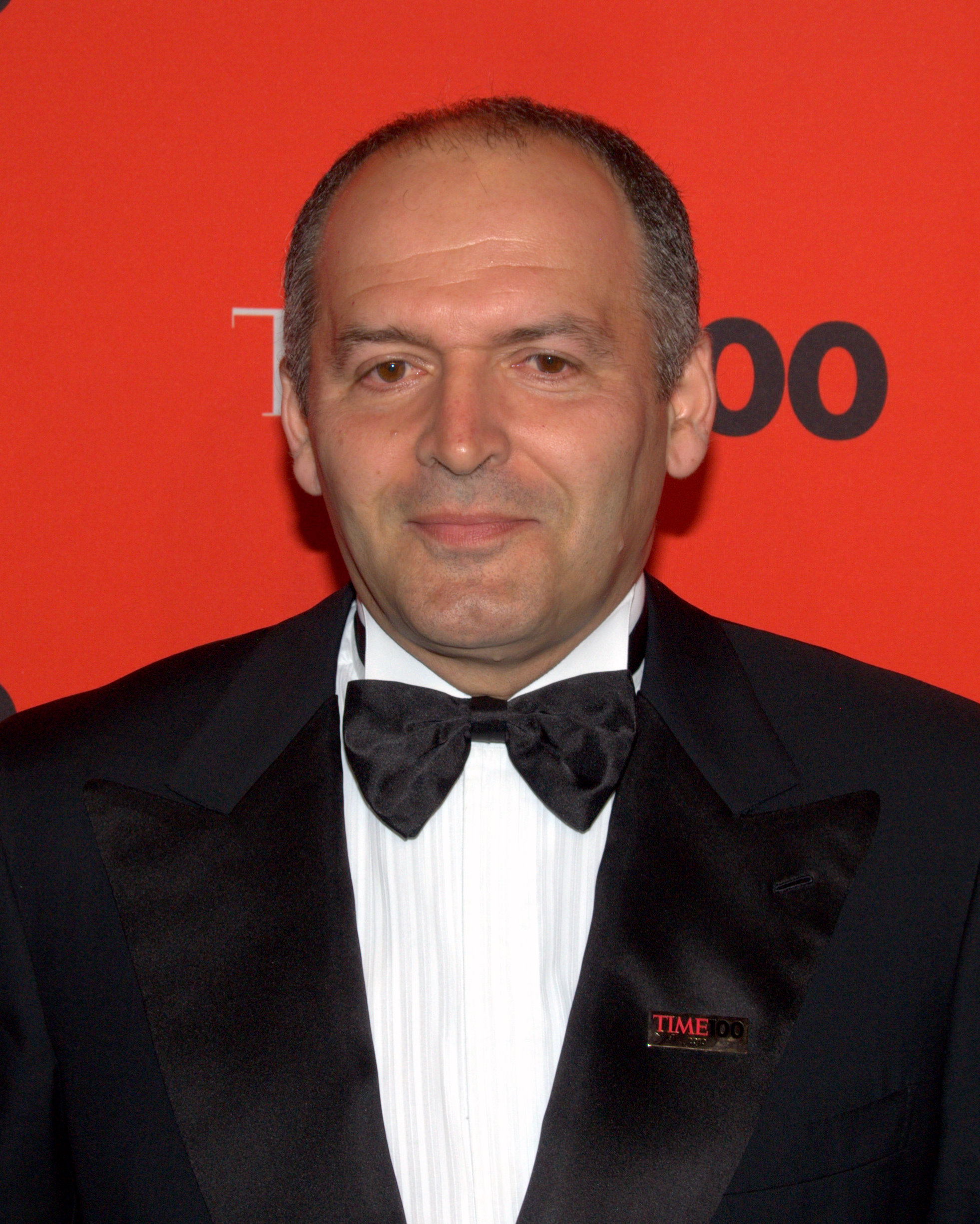
- Pinchuk in 2010
- Born: Віктор Михайлович Пінчук; Viktor Mykhailovych Pinchuk; 14 December 1960 (age 65); Kyiv, Ukrainian SSR, Soviet Union (present-day Kyiv, Ukraine)
- Education: Dnipropetrovsk Metallurgical Institute (doctorate)
- Occupation: Businessman
- Known for: Interpipe Group; EastOne Group LLC
- Spouses: Elena Arshava (divorced) Olena Pinchuk (m. 2002)
- Children: 4

Victor Mykhailovych Pinchuk (Ukrainian: Віктор Михайлович Пінчук, romanized: Viktor Mykhailovych Pinchuk; born 14 December 1960) is a Ukrainian businessman, former politician and oligarch.

As of July 2026, Forbes magazine ranked him as 1515th on the list of wealthiest people in the world, with a fortune of US$2.8 billion. This made him one of Ukraine's six billionaires in 2026.

Pinchuk is the founder of EastOne Group LLC, an international investing, project funding and financial advisory company based in London, and of Interpipe Group, one of Ukraine's leading pipe, wheel and steel producers. Pinchuk is the owner of four TV channels and a popular tabloid, Fakty i Kommentarii. He was a member of the Ukrainian parliament, the Verkhovna Rada, for two consecutive terms from 1998 to 2006. He is married to Olena Pinchuk, the daughter of former Ukrainian President Leonid Kuchma.

== Early life and education ==
Pinchuk was born in 1960 in Kyiv to Jewish parents who moved to the industrial city of Dnipropetrovsk. in 1987, he graduated from Dnipropetrovsk Metallurgical Institute with a doctorate in industrial engineering.

== Career ==
=== Media empire ===
Prior to the Russian invasion of Ukraine, Pinchuk was known to most Ukrainians, alongside his wife, as the largest shareholder and owner of StarlightMedia, one of the biggest media conglomerates in Ukraine. StarLightMedia encompasses several major television channels and is a dominant player in the Ukrainian broadcasting landscape. StarLightMedia also owns and operates Starlight Entertainment, a company that runs live events such as concerts, corporate conferences, and awards shows.

As a result of the vast holdings by Oligarchs such as Pinchuk and Ihor Kolomoisky (the owner of 1+1) in Ukrainian television, their companies often dominated the Teletriumph Awards. This led to many tensions within the television industry, including boycotts of the events – both by companies in opposition to Pinchuk, and by companies owned by Pinchuk and his wife. Added to this tension was the movement within the Ukrainian government to move the country towards more Ukrainian language content on television, and away from so much Russian language content on television.

In addition to television assets, Pinchuk was also a key figure in Ukrainian radio broadcasting. In 2016, he was a co-owner of TAVR Media, a major Ukrainian radio holding that operates several popular radio stations, including Hit-FM, Kiss-FM, Russkoe Radio Ukraina, Radio Relax, Radio ROKS, and Radio Melodia. TAVR Media functions through various subsidiary companies such as Liamin, Mir, and Pilot, with ownership stakes ranging from 95% to 100%. Through these enterprises, Pinchuk maintained significant influence in Ukraine.

=== Other holdings ===
In 1990, he founded Interpipe on the basis of his patented innovations.

Interpipe is a major producer of seamless pipes and railway wheels. In 2004, Pinchuk and Rinat Akhmetov, two of Ukraine's richest men, acquired the Kryvorizhstal steel factory for about $800 million. Then-President Leonid Kuchma, who is Pinchuk's father-in-law, authorized the state asset sale, which competitors complained was far below market rate. Later, the first Tymoshenko government reversed this sale, and held a nationally televised repeat auction that netted $4.8 billion. In 2006, Pinchuk founded an investment advisory company, EastOne. Its portfolio includes industrial assets such as production of pipes and tubes, rail car wheels, specialty steels and alloys, machinery, as well as media.

Pinchuk was a member of the Ukrainian Parliament between 1998 and 2006 for Labour Ukraine. He left politics after he came to the conclusion that Ukraine had reached a level of development when business and politics should be separated.

Pinchuk is a member of the International Advisory Board of the Atlantic Council. He was on the Board of the Peterson Institute for International Economics, of the International Advisory Council of Brookings Institution and of the Corporate Advisory Board of the Global Business Coalition against HIV/AIDS, TB and Malaria.

In 2013, American steel makers filed a case with the United States Department of Commerce alleging that Interpipe Group was illegally dumping steel tubes into the American natural gas market. In November 2013, Fitch Ratings downgraded Interpipe because of the dumping accusations and a missed $106 million debt payment.

=== Accusations of corruption ===
On 4 March 2015, at the hearing on Special Control Commission of Privatization in the Verkhovna Rada of Ukraine, oligarch Igor Kolomoisky accused Viktor Pinchuk of receiving a bribe of $5 million a month for the rights to manage Ukrnafta, 50 + 1% of which is owned by the state-owned company Naftogaz of Ukraine. According to Kolomoisky, the money was transferred to offshore companies, the "ultimate owners of which were identified" as Victor Pinchuk and Leonid Kuchma.

"We paid this money, and besides that, we paid dividends to the state, all taxes and everything else. But for the right to receive our dividends, we were forced to pay another 5 million from our dividends to Pinchuk", - said Kolomoisky.

On 18 March 2015, National Anti-Corruption Bureau opened criminal proceedings. According to the investigation, the amount of the bribe to Viktor Pinchuk from 2003 to 2006 was allegedly $110 million.

In December 2015, Pinchuk brought a $2 billion civil action against fellow oligarch Ihor Kolomoyskyi and Gennadiy Bogolyubov in the High Court of Justice in London over the 2004 purchase of a Ukrainian mining company. Allegations made include murder and bribery. In January 2016, an undisclosed out of court settlement was reached just before the trial was due to start.

=== Promoting Ukraine to join the European Union ===
In 2004, Pinchuk created Yalta European Strategy, an international independent organization to promote Ukraine joining the European Union. Its annual summer meeting in Yalta was a Ukraine-EU forum for debate and policy recommendations development. Since the annexation of Crimea by the Russian Federation these meetings have been taking place in Kyiv. In September 2013, Pinchuk and Tony Blair introduced Hillary Clinton's keynote address to the conference at Livadia Palace, with Bill Clinton in attendance. Stefan Fule, Paul Krugman, Alexei Kudrin, Shimon Peres, Dominique Strauss-Kahn, Larry Summers and other political and business leaders have attended. In September 2015, Pinchuk donated $150,000 to the Donald J. Trump Foundation in exchange for a 20-minute video appearance by Donald Trump shown at the conference that year in Kyiv. Michael Cohen solicited Douglas Schoen for the donation from Pinchuk, which was the largest outside donation the Trump Foundation received that year.

In 2015, Pinchuk promoted closer ties between Ukraine and the EU. He was an active participant in the World Economic Forum at Davos.

In December 2016, Viktor Pinchuk published an article in the Wall Street Journal "Ukraine Must Make Painful Compromises for Peace With Russia", in which he suggested that Ukraine temporarily abandon the prospect of EU membership, exclude NATO membership and make a compromise with Russia on the Crimea peninsula on purpose the achieving peace in Eastern Ukraine. The article drew criticism from Ukrainian political authorities of Ukraine. Then-President Petro Poroshenko canceled a visit to the Davos Ukrainian Lunch, which took place on January 19, 2017.

Former Vice-Prime-Minister for European and Euro-Atlantic Integration of Ukraine Ivanna Klimpush-Tsintsadze said that the theses of Pinchuk's "peace plan" had already been used by Russian propaganda. Russia's War Crimes House, formerly Russia House, is building 68, Promenade in Davos rented by Pinchuk, where he informs about Ukrainian civilian war deaths.

== Personal life and wealth ==
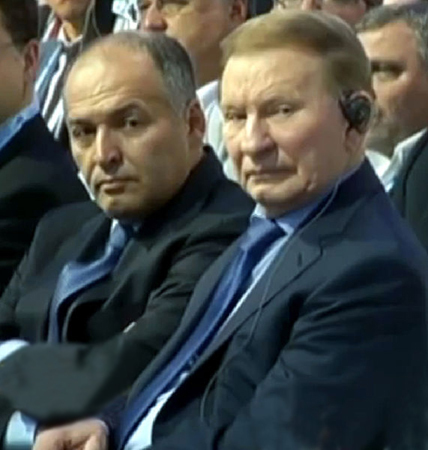
Pinchuk with his father-in-law Leonid Kuchma in 2014

Victor Pinchuk is married to Olena Pinchuk, the daughter of the second president of Ukraine, Leonid Kuchma. Olena Pinchuk runs the ANTIAIDS Foundation, which focuses on prevention and retroviral distribution and AIDS care in Ukraine. She and Pinchuk are friends of singer Elton John and former US President Bill Clinton, whose 65th birthday party Pinchuk attended in Los Angeles. Victor Pinchuk has three daughters and a son.

Pinchuk spent more than $6 million on his 50th birthday party in Courchevel, flying in Cirque du Soleil and chef Alain Ducasse.

Forbes ranked him No. 1,250 on the list of the wealthiest people in the world in 2016, with a fortune of US$1.44 billion. Pinchuk was listed as one of the "2010 Time 100 – The World's Most Influential People" in Time Magazine. He was ranked No. 38 on ArtReview magazine's 2013 Power 100 ranking of people in contemporary art.

== Philanthropy ==
Pinchuk has supported philanthropic projects in Ukraine. In 2006, he consolidated these activities under the Victor Pinchuk Foundation, as of 2013 considered the largest private Ukrainian philanthropic foundation. The foundation is active in the fields of health, education, culture, international affairs, human rights and local communities.

The foundation's projects include the largest private scholarship program in Ukraine "Zavtra.UA", the scholarship program for Ukrainian students studying abroad "WorldWideStudies", and the annual "Ukrainian Lunch" and "Philanthropic Roundtable" on the occasion of the World Economic Forum in Davos. The foundation supports and works with a variety of partners, including the network "Yalta European Strategy" created to promote Ukraine's European integration, the Clinton Global Initiative, the Kyiv School of Economics, Tony Blair Faith Foundation, the Brookings Institution, the Peterson Institute for International Economics, the Israeli Presidential Conference "Facing Tomorrow", and the legal clinics/legal aid projects of the Renaissance Foundation.

Its projects include giving $150,000 to the Trump Foundation as speaking fee in 2015, the creation of a network of modern neonatal centres throughout Ukraine ("Cradles of Hope"), cooperation programs with the Clinton Global Initiative, the Elton John AIDS Foundation and the ANTIAIDS Foundation of his wife Olena Pinchuk, the creation of the Kyiv School of Economics, a cooperation with the Aspen Institute, the opening of the first large scale contemporary art centre in Ukraine PinchukArtCentre, the production and promotion of a film with Steven Spielberg on the Holocaust in Ukraine, and support of local Jewish communities.

In June 2009, Pinchuk organized the Paul McCartney free concert on Independence Square in Kyiv in front of 500,000 people. As an initiative of the Pinchuk Art Center, in December 2009, Pinchuk announced a new $100,000 prize for artists under the age of 35. The Future Generation Art Prize is awarded every two years and is open to any young artist who applies online. Damien Hirst, Takashi Murakami, Andreas Gursky and Jeff Koons, artists whose work Pinchuk collects, serve as mentors to the finalists and the winner.

In February 2013, Pinchuk committed to giving half or more of his fortune during his lifetime and beyond to philanthropic causes, joining the Giving Pledge, a philanthropic initiative founded in 2010 by Bill Gates and Warren Buffett.

Pinchuk has donated from $10 to $25 million to the Clinton Foundation between 1994 and 2005. In 2000, Pinchuk hired former Clinton pollster Douglas Schoen on a $40,000 per month retainer. In 2004, Schoen introduced Pinchuk to Hillary Clinton. Between September 2011 and November 2012, Schoen arranged nearly a dozen meetings between Pinchuk and senior State Department officials, including Melanne Verveer. Emails released by Judicial Watch and obtained through FOIA requests showed that Pinchuk had been invited to dine at Hillary Clinton's home during her tenure at the State department, despite her spokesman's previous denial that they had met during that time. In March 2017, former Trump aide Monica Crowley registered as a foreign agent for Pinchuk.

In November 2014 in Kyiv, Pinchuk was presented with the 2014 Metropolitan Andrey Sheptytsky Award for his work in fostering Ukrainian-Jewish relations.

In June 2022 Pinchuk and his wife donated over £10 million to charity to support Ukrainian soldiers and civilians needing prosthetics, medical treatment, rehabilitation and other humanitarian aid for Ukrainians in the Russo-Ukrainian War. This was through the sale of a Jeff Koons sculpture.

== See also ==
- Victor Pinchuk Foundation
- ICTV
- Interpipe
- PinchukArtCentre
