= STB (TV channel) =

Ukrainian TV channel

STB СТБ
- Country: Ukraine
- Headquarters: Kyiv, Ukraine

Programming
- Picture format: 1080i (HDTV) (downscaled to 576i for SDTV)

Ownership
- Owner: Starlight Media Group 50% Modern Times Group
- Key people: Volodymyr Borodyanskyi, Oleksiy Mustafin

History
- Launched: 2 June 1997

Links
- Website: www.stb.ua

Availability

Terrestrial
- Zeonbud: MX-1 (6)

STB (Ukrainian: СТБ) is a Ukrainian commercial television network. Currently, the network's coverage reaches 85% of Ukraine's territory. It broadcasts in all oblast regional administrative centers and every Ukrainian city with a population over 50,000. It ranks as the top TV network in Ukraine.

The channel is a part of the Starlight Media broadcasting group, established by Victor Pinchuk.

== History ==
Vikna logo, 2021

Origins of the network can be traced back to 1997 when the network was initially founded as a joint venture between the Ukrainian and American companies International Media Center, Shachar Enterprises, Inc., and Internews Netouron K. STB was officially launched on 2 June 1997. Since 1997, STB has been controlled by Volodymyr Sivkovych, a Ukrainian businessman and politician. He was the one, who decided to create the TV channel. Since September 1996, the crew of STB broadcast news under the title Vikna (Ukrainian: Вікна, "Windows") on the frequency of UT-2.

In 1999, STB fell under the influence of companies of the Russian Lukoil Group through its Norcross Corporation because of pro Russia pro Kremlin pro Putin Leonid Kuchma's support for aggressive actions taken against STB management's independent position in early 1999 resulting in Oleksiy Fedun, who made STB into a very pro Kuchma platform, becoming the executive president of the network on 6 September 1999.

In 2000, the popularity of the channel rose. The most popular programs are Vikna. News., Vikna. Business., Vikna. Capital-city., Vikna. Crimes., Vikna. Sport. and Vikna. Midnight. STB becomes an info-channel.

In 2000, Vikna was registered as a trademark of STB. In 2001 STB became a registered trademark. STB became the first Ukrainian television network that got a domain name and website – stb.ua.

In 2002, the administration of STB changes its brand as an info-channel. There are more entertaining programs on air, such as, National Striptise Championship of Ukraine, reality-shows The House and Starving, and the scandalous talk show Restricted Zone. The popularity of STB falls. Lukoil tries to sell STB.

In 2004, STB becomes the property of one of Leonid Kuchma son in law Viktor Pinchuk's StarLightMedia Group.

Through 1997 to 2010, many famous television personalities have worked at STB. The most popular of them are Georgiy Gongadze, Myroslava Gongadze, Yurii Horban, Oleksii Mustafin, Kateryna Nesterenko, Osman Pashayev, Tetyana Ramus, Roman Skrypin, Ihor Tatarchuk, Iryna Vannikova, Kateryna Mykytiuk, Mykola Veresen, Alena Vinnytska and Natalka Yakymovych.

== STB today ==
Since 2005 the programs of STB were changed. The group of news programs called Windows got a better look (They began to look very close to BBC News). New popular shows were introduced. Thanks to the format change, STB entered the top 5 Ukrainian channels by share in 2006, and in 2007 it became the 3rd largest Ukrainian channel by audience share (appr. 8% for 18+ audiences). STB's most popular programs are "Paralelnyi Svit" (Parallel World) and "Bytva Ekstrasensiv" (Psychic Challenge). In 2008 STB launched the "Tantsuyut Vsi" (So You Think You Can Dance) talent show. In May 2009 STB started the "Ukraina maye Talant" ("Ukraine's Got Talent") show, similar to ITV's Britain's Got Talent.

Related to the annexation of Crimea by the Russian Federation STB broadcasts in Sevastopol ended on 9 March 2014, 14:30 o'clock East European time.

== Audience, Market Share & Reach ==
- According to Media Ownership Monitor, STB’s audience share is 8.5%.
- In May 2023, according to BigDataUA, STB had a viewing share of 8.61%, ranking 2nd among studied channels.
- In March 2023, STB took 2nd place in the top 20 TV channels with 8.1% share.

== Language policy ==
Is one of a few Ukrainian TV channels, which use particular rules of Kharkiv orthography in some TV programs. That causes both compliments and critics from the society.

But, according to monitoring data made by "Boycott Russian Films" campaign activists on 27 September 2014, there was approximately 54% of Russian language content on the channel.

== See also ==
- Starlight Media
