= Novyi Kanal =

Ukrainian television channel

Novyi Kanal Новий канал
- Country: Ukraine
- Broadcast area: Ukraine
- Headquarters: Kyiv, Ukraine

Programming
- Languages: Ukrainian, Russian (until 2022)
- Picture format: 1080i (HDTV) (downscaled to 576i for SDTV)

Ownership
- Owner: Starlight Media

History
- Launched: July 15, 1998; 28 years ago

Links
- Website: novy.tv

Availability

Terrestrial
- Zeonbud: MX-2 (11)

Novyi Kanal (Ukrainian: Новий канал [noˈwɪj kɐˈnɑl], lit. 'New Channel') is a Ukrainian television channel. The channel is a part of the Starlight Media broadcasting group, created by Viktor Pinchuk.

== History ==
The channel was launched on July 15, 1998. At first, it was broadcast only in Kyiv, but since 1999, it has extended its range to six other regions of Ukraine. Starting in 2000, the channel has been received in more than 17 major cities. Novyi Kanal has been transmitted by satellite since December 20, 2000.

On March 1, 2001, the channel was the first in Ukraine to switch to round-the-clock broadcasting.

In 2002, Novyi Kanal was third in Ukrainian television ratings after Inter and 1+1. However, the channel's ratings have steadily decreased in recent years: 10.11% in 2004, 9.1% in 2005, 8.5% in 2006, and in 2007, only 7.42%.

September 2, 2008 took the lead in commercial audience 14-49 (cities 50+): audience share increased to 13.83%.

On November 11, 2009, Elena Pinchuk, Head of the supervisory board of the TV Group, held a presentation of the StarLightMedia brand, which brought together the leaders of the Ukrainian media market — Novyi Kanal, ICTV, STB, M1, M2 and Kui-TB.

Novyi Kanal broadcasts in Sevastopol ended on March 9, 2014, at 14:30 o'clock East European time due to the annexation of Crimea by the Russian Federation.

In 2014, Novyi Kanal was criticized for broadcasting Russian TV series. According to the results of monitoring by activists of the “Boycott of Russian Cinema” campaign, for the period from September 8 to 14, 7 hours and 35 minutes of Russian content were shown on the TV channel.

On July 6, 2015, a new entertainment broadcasting network was launched. Information and sports programs were removed, leaving only animated and feature films, television series, and entertainment shows.

Because of the 2022 Russian invasion of Ukraine, on February 24 and 25, 2022, the TV channel broadcast the United News information marathon around the clock. Since February 25, the TV channel has reprogrammed its broadcast for children and teenagers. There are no commercials on the air since December 29, 2021.

== Personalities ==
In 1999-2004 the channel was headed by Oleksandr Tkachenko. In 2005-2012 the Novyi was run by Iryna Lysenko. The channel was managed by Vladimir Lokotko since May 2012, in 2019 Alexey Gladushevsky became General Director

Many prominent journalists have worked at the channel since its inception, including Andriy Kulykov, Andriy Shevchenko, Hanna Homonai, Lidiya Taran, Vitalii Hlahola, and Sviatoslav Tseholko.

== Satellite Television ==
- Satellite: Amos (4.0°W)
- Standard: DVB-S
- Frequency: 11140
- Personal: Horizontal
- Speed: 30000
- FEC: 3/4
- Image: MPEG-4
- Audio: MPEG L-2
- Code: FTA
- Satellite: Amos (4.0°W)
- Standard: DVB-S
- Frequency: 12297
- Personal: Horizontal
- Speed: 45000
- FEC: 3/4
- Image: MPEG-4
- Audio: MPEG L-2
- Code: FTA
