= Anastasia Kozhevnikova =

Ukrainian singer and songwriter (born 1993)

- Анастасія Кожевнікова
- Kozhevnikova in 2018
- Born: Anastasia Dmytrivna Kozhevnikova; 26 March 1993 (age 33); Yuzhnoukrainsk, Ukraine
- Citizenship: Ukrainian
- Occupations: singer; songwriter; actress
- Years active: 2013–present
- Height: 1.67 m (5 ft 6 in)
- Spouse: Kirill Snytkov
- Musical career
- Genre: Pop
- Instrument: Vocals
- Labels: Velvet Music; Meladze Music; Zhara Music
- Formerly of: Nu Virgos

Anastasia Dmytrivna Kozhevnikova (Ukrainian: Анастасія Дмитрівна Кожевнікова; born 26 March 1993) is a Ukrainian singer, songwriter and former member of the girl group Nu Virgos.

== Life and career ==
Kozhevnikova was born on 26 March 1993 in Yuzhnoukrainsk. At the age of six, she sang in a choir "Капельки" (Droplets). Two years later, she went to a music school to take piano lessons. At the same time, she also studied the basics of acting and choreography, studying at the model pop song theater "Галатея". Kozhevnikova took part in various competitions as a child, such as "Бегущие по волнам" (Running on Waves), "Первые ласточки" and "Молода Галичина", but did not receive much success from them. At the age of 16, Kozhevnikova participated in her first casting for the show "Супер зірка" (Supergirl) in which she passed the qualifying round, but the timing of the filming of the show coincided with her exams, and so she had to decline participation on the show. At the next casting for the show X-Factor, Kozhevnikova made it to the first round where she performed in a trio with the other participants, but they didn't make it any further in the contest. In 2011, Kozhevnikova gained admission to "Киевский Национальный Университет Технологии и Дизайна" (Kyiv National University of Technologies and Design), where she obtained a degree in Company Management.

=== The show "Хочу V ВИА Гру" (I Want To Be in Nu Virgos) ===
On 25 November 2012, Konstantin Meladze announced the disbandment of the girl group Nu Virgos on 1 January 2013, explaining that the group was outdated in its existing format. However, a week later, it was announced that there would be casting for the group in the format of a reality show called "Хочу V ВИА Гру" (I Want To Be in Nu Virgos). Meladze said that it was time for a new Nu Virgos in a new format. Kozhevnikova performed in the first round of the show, and made it to the second round by performing Konstantin Meladze's song "Безответно" (Unrequited). In the second round, Kozhevnikova successfully performed with Elena Pischikova and Diana Shimanovskaya, but Meladze later put her in a group with Misha Romanova and Erika Herceg. In the end, the eight trios had to compete to be taken by one of the mentors, which were the former soloists of Nu Virgos. The groups chose their individual songs to perform. The trio of Kozhevnikova, Romanova and Herceg were chosen by Albina Dzhanabaeva, but Meladze disallowed the choice of the mentor due to the fact that the trio cut their concert dresses before the performance, and without the prior knowledge of the costume designers. The trio were supposed to leave the show, but Nadezhda Granovskaya convinced Meladze to keep them and hand the group over to her for mentorship. Under the guidance of Granovskaya, the girls reached the finals where they performed the song "Перемирие" (Truce), and according to the results of the audience vote on 25 October, they won, becoming the new line-up of the group Nu Virgos. The song "Перемирие" (Truce) would later go on to win many awards for the group, and became the most popular song of the new lineup.

=== 2013–2018: Nu Virgos ===
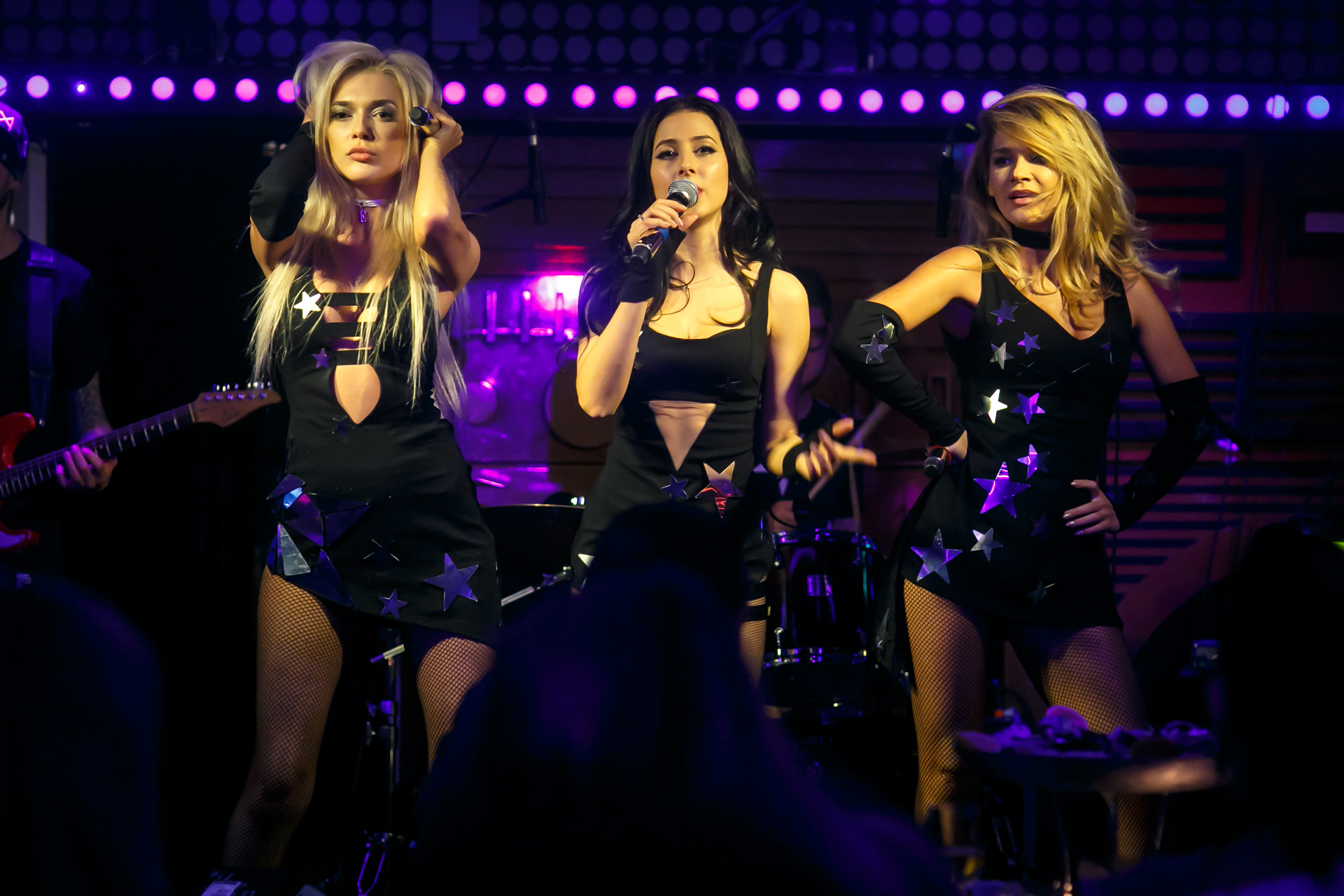
Kozhevnikova performing as member of the group in 2016

The first large event at which the group performed in the new lineup was at the holiday concert "We are United," which took place in the Kremlin on 4 November. After which, the trio started actively touring. Over time, in addition to new singles, the repertoire of the renewed lineup included 17 hits of past years with modified arrangements. In December, Kozhevnikova appeared in her first photo shoot with the group for the men's magazine XXL. On 13 May 2014, the group's second single, "У меня появился другой" (I Got Another One) was released, which was the most played song on the radio that year. On 12 June, the music video for the song was released, and became the most viewed Russian music video of the year. On 29 November, the group received an award at the Golden Gramophone Awards for the song "Перемирие" (Truce). According to TopHit, Nu Virgos was in the top of the most rotated groups on the radio in 2014. On 6 June 2015, the group received "Премию Муз-ТВ" for the tenth time with the song "Кислород" (Oxygen), featuring the Russian rapper MOT.

On 24 August 2018, Kozhevnikova got married. During her wedding, she announced that on 2 September, her contract with the group would be ending, in which she had chosen not to renew it due to wanting to pursue a solo career.

=== 2019–present: Solo career ===
On 7 February 2019, Kozhevnikova released her debut solo song "Любить тебя" (To Love You). The song was composed by Kozhevnikova herself, and the lyrics were co-written by her and her former colleague from Nu Virgos, Misha Romanova. On 1 August, Kozhevnikova released her second single "Так, как ты" (The Way You Are). In October, Kozhevnikovva released a "Mood Video″ for her new song "Вселенная" (Universe) and in December, a promo single "Кокон" (Cocoon) was released.

In the summer of 2020, Kozhevnikova came back with a new single "Мотылёк" (Butterfly).

On 26 November 2021, Kozhevnikova released a collaboration with the Ukrainian group MBreeze with the song "Тет-а-тет" (Face-to-Face)

== Discography ==
=== Singles ===
==== Solo ====
Year	Title	English translation	Album
2019	Любить Тебя; Так, как ты; Вселенная; Кокон	To Love You; The Way You Are; Universe; Cocoon	Non-album singles
2020	Мотылек	Butterfly	Non-album singles

==== As featured artist ====
Year	Title	English translation	Album
2021	Тет-а-тет (feat. MBreeze)	Face-to-Face	Non-album single

==== With Nu Virgos ====
Year	Title	English translation	Album
2013	Перемирие	Truce	Всё лучшее в одном
2014	У Меня Появился Другой Кислород (feat. MOT)	I got another one Oxygen	Всё лучшее в одном (only I Got Another One)
2015	Так Сильно Это Было Прекрасно	So much It Was Wonderful	Всё лучшее в одном (only It Was Wonderful)
2016	Кто Ты Мне?	Who Are You To Me?	Non-album singles
2017	Моё Сердце Занято	My Heart Is Busy	Non-album singles
