= Tatiana Kotova =

Russian singer, actress and television personality

Tatiana Kotova Татьяна Котова
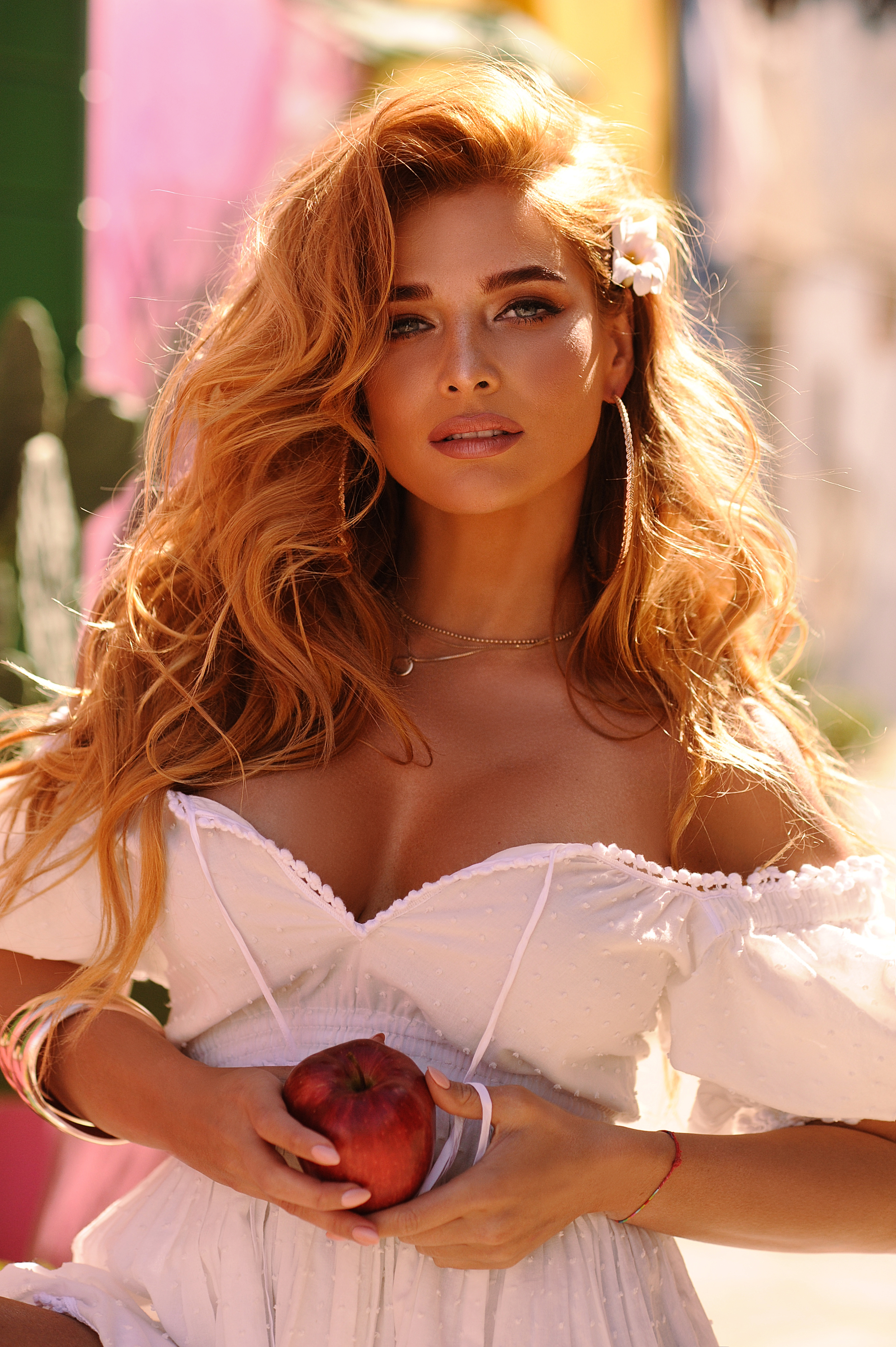

Background information
- Born: Tatiana Nikolayevna Kotova; 3 September 1985 (age 41); Sholokhovsky, Russian SFSR, Soviet Union
- Origin: Russian
- Genre: Pop
- Occupations: Singer, Actress, TV host
- Years active: 2010–present

Tatiana Kotova
- Born: Tatiana Nikolayevna Kotova; 3 September 1985 (age 41); Russia
- Height: 1.75 m (5 ft 9 in)
- Beauty pageant titleholder
- Title: Miss Russia 2006
- Hair color: Blonde
- Eye color: Blue

Tatiana Nikolaevna Kotova (Russian: Татьяна Николаевна Котова; born 3 September 1985) is a Russian singer, actress, television host and beauty pageant titleholder. She is the winner of the title Miss Russia 2006 and former soloist of Ukrainian female pop group Nu Virgos.

In 2006, she won the title of Miss Russia and had the opportunity to represent Russia in the contests Miss World 2007 and Miss Universe 2007. Kotova was one of the favorites in the Miss Universe 2007, but did not reach the semi-finals. She is the third Russian to participate in both Miss Universe and Miss World after Anna Malova and Svetlana Goreva.

From March 2008 to April 2010, she was a vocalist of the pop-band Nu Virgos, replacing Vera Brezhneva. She currently works in a solo career.

== 1985–2005: Early life ==
Tatiana Kotova was born on 3 September 1985, in Sholokhovsky (Rostov region) in a small close-knit family. Her father, Nicholay Kotov, worked as a miner, trucker, and later engaged in business activity. Her mother, Marina Kotova, worked in a bank. Tatiana has a younger sister Ekaterina. Tatiana Kotova took part in her first beauty contest "Miss Autumn 98" at school and won the title "Miss Charm". During her studies for a degree in Crisis Management at the Faculty of Economics of the Southern Federal University, Tatiana was invited to a modeling training course by agency "Image Elite".

== 2006–2007: Miss Russia, Miss World, and Miss Universe ==
A few months later, Kotova received an offer to take part in the competition "Best Model of the South of Russia". She entered the top five finalists. Then there were many beauty contests and victories in her career. In December 2006, Kotova won "Miss Russia 2006" title with 53% viewers' votes. In 2007, she represented Russia in international competitions "Miss Universe" and "Miss World". Tatiana was one of the favorites of the contests.

== 2008–2010: Nu Virgos (VIA Gra) ==
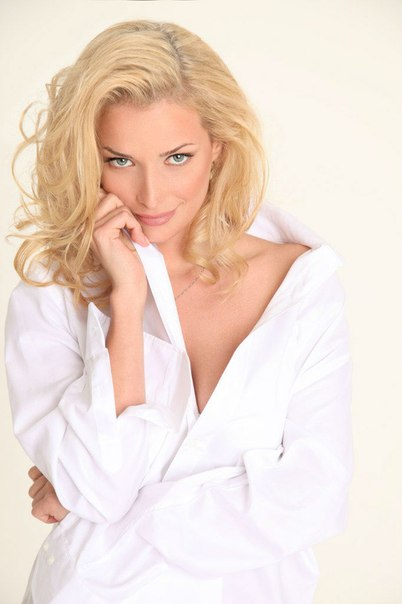
Kotova in 2014

On 17 March 2008, Kotova became a participant of the famous pop group Nu Virgos (VIA Gra in Russian spelling). Debut music video featuring Tatiana called I'm not afraid (Я не боюсь). At the shooting time (February 2008) Kotova was not yet a participant of Nu Virgos, therefore video was filmed with Albina Dzhanabaeva and Meseda Bagaudinova. Episodes with Tatiana were added later. The first performances as a trio took place in Moscow, in Sungate Port Royal (Antalya, Turkey) and in Ogre (Latvia). First television shooting was a concert dedicated to the thirtieth of the newspaper Arguments and Facts. In summer 2008, Nu Virgos presented videos My emancipation and American wife (Американская жена).

In early January 2009, the first participant Nadezhda Granovskaya returned in Nu Virgos. Trio recorded two singles Anti-geisha (Антигейша) and Crazy (Сумасшедший) and shot videos, directed by Alan Badoev and Sergey Solodkii. The last Kotova performance in the group «Nu Virgos» was held in Ukrainian Star Factory. Super final on 21 March 2010. Kotova officially announced her retirement at a press conference on 22 April 2010. Tatiana was replaced by Eva Bushmina from third Ukrainian Star Factory.

== 2010–present: solo career ==
In June 2010, Kotova played a role of business-woman Ksenia Morozova in the television soap opera Happiness is somewhere near (А счастье где-то рядом) directed by Vasily Mishchenko. In September 2010, Kotova started a solo music career. The song He (Он, written by Irina Dubtsova) became her debut solo single. The video was directed by Alan Badoev. Second single was named Red on red (Красное на красном). It was written by Alexey Romanoff.

In 2010, Kotova became a TV-presenter. She compered the program Fashion Emergency assistance (Скорая модная помощь) on Muz TV Channel paired with designer Max Chernitsov. On 28 September 2010, Kotova debuted with solo live performance in St. Petersburg. She presented a song Vampiritsa (Вампирица). Then the release of the singles Obladi (Облади) and Peace for strong men (Мир для сильных мужчин) was followed.

On 18 April 2012, the song and the video In games of the nights was released (В играх ночей, directed by Maria Skobeleva). Video looks quite provocative, because of what Tatiana had to do censorship version. This video was presented in the category "Most sex video" on Russian Music Awards RU TV 2012, but the award went to Ukrainian singer OKSI for her video Love for two (Любить за двоих). In mid-2012, new video of Kotova song Everything is just beginning (Всё только начинается, directed by Sergey Tkachenko) was presented in the air of the most popular music TV channels in Russia. On 7 November 2012, the song Recognition (Признание) was presented. On 3 December 2012, collaboration with rapper Stan - the song Melt (Раствориться) - appeared on the Internet. On 4 December 2012, Kotova introduced her new concert show in Moscow karaoke club Isterika. The performance included both songs and new compositions ("Ex-Lovers") and remixes of some popular Russian pop-songs (I love soldiers – «Я люблю военных» Ирины Аллегровой).

In 2013, Kotova released the song Violet (ФиоЛЕТО) in the creation of which involved well-known Ukrainian singer, writer and producer Alex Potapenko (Potapov). In December, Tatiana Kotova received an offer to play in continuing the comedy film What men are doing (Что творят мужчины). In January 2014, Tatyana Kotova took part in shooting of this film in America. In May 2014 Kotova released a new single Everything will be as you want (Всё будет так, как хочешь ты).

== Personal life ==
Kotova urged peace between Russia and Ukraine on Instagram and Facebook on 24 February 2022, during the Russian invasion of Ukraine.

Preceded by Alexandra Ivanovskaya	Miss Russia; 2006	Succeeded by Ksenia Sukhinova
