= Potselui (song) =

2007 single by Nu Virgos

Single by Nu Virgos

from the album Potselui
- Released: 2 September 2007
- Recorded: 2 July 2007
- Genre: Pop rock
- Length: 4:17; 2:59 (censore radio edit)
- Label: Monolit Records
- Songwriter: Konstantin Meladze

Nu Virgos singles chronology
"Tsvetok i nozh" (2006)	"Potselui" (2007)	"Ya ne boyus" (2007)

"Potselui" (Russian: Поцелуи, Kisses) is the 19th single released in September 2007 by Ukrainian/Russian girl group Nu Virgos. Song hit the Ukrainian, Russian and Latvian charts in few weeks.

== Chart positions ==
Chart (2007)	Peak position
Russian Airplay Chart	1
Ukrainian Airplay Chart	1
Latvian Airplay Chart	2

== Soloists ==
- Albina Dzhanabaeva
- Meseda Bagaudinova
