= Popytka No. 5 =

- Original 2001 release

Studio album by Nu Virgos
- Released: 27 September 2001 (RU/UKR); June 2002 (RU/UKR, reissue)
- Recorded: 2000–2001
- Genres: Dance-pop; pop rock; teen pop; adult contemporary
- Language: Russian
- Label: Sony Music
- Producers: Konstantin Meladze; Dmytro Kostyuk

Nu Virgos chronology
Popytka No. 5 (2001)	Stop! Snyato! (2003)

Singles from Popytka No. 5
- 1. "Popytka No. 5" Released: 3 September 2000; 2. "Obnimi menya" Released: November 2000; 3. "Bomba" Released: February 2001; 4. "Ya ne vernus'" Released: 27 September 2001

Alternate cover
- 2002 reissue

Popytka No. 5 (Russian: Попытка No. 5, lit. 'Attempt No. 5') is the debut album by the Ukrainian girl group Nu Virgos.

== Track listing ==
All tracks are written by Konstantin Meladze.

Original 2001 release
No.	Title	Length
1.	"Zaklinanie" (Russian: Заклинание, lit. 'Spell')	3:42
2.	"Popytka No. 5" (Russian: Попытка No. 5, lit. 'Attempt No. 5')	3:25
3.	"Ya ne vernus'" (Russian: Я не вернусь, lit. 'I won't be back')	3:46
4.	"Poznakomsya s moey mamoy" (Russian: Познакомься с моей мамой, lit. 'Let me introduce my mama')	3:36
5.	"Chto zhe ya nadelala?" (Russian: Что же я наделала?, lit. 'What have I done?')	3:32
6.	"Bomba" (Russian: Бомба, lit. 'Bomb')	3:28
7.	"Otpustil by ty menya" (Russian: Отпустил бы ты меня, lit. 'If you could just let me go')	3:15
8.	"Seychas ili nikogda" (Russian: Сейчас или никогда, lit. 'Now or never')	3:41
9.	"Obnimi menya" (Russian: Обними меня, lit. 'Hold me closer')	3:54
10.	"Spasibo za leto" (Russian: Спасибо за лето, lit. 'Thanks for the summer')	3:26
11.	"Kazhdyy den'" (Russian: Каждый день, lit. 'Every day')	3:39

2002 reissue
No.	Title	Length
12.	"Stop! Stop! Stop!" (original; Russian: Стоп! Стоп! Стоп!, lit. 'Stop! Stop! Stop!')	3:46
13.	"Stop! Stop! Stop!" (disco house mix by YaD)	3:46
14.	"Stop! Stop! Stop!" (Latino mix by YaD)	3:46
15.	"Ya ne vernus'" (disco space mix by YaD)	3:23
16.	"Ya ne vernus'" (disco acid drum mix by YaD)	3:46

== Vocals ==
- Alena Vinnitskaya
- Nadezhda Granovskaya (only original release)
- Anna Sedokova (only reissue)
- Tatiana Naynik (only reissue)

== Videos ==
- "Popytka No. 5" (2000)
- "Obnimi menya" (2000)
- "Bomba" (2001)
- "Ya ne vernus'" (2001)

== Certifications ==
Country	Certification
Russia	Gold
