= Olga Romanovskaya =

Ukrainian singer (born 1986)

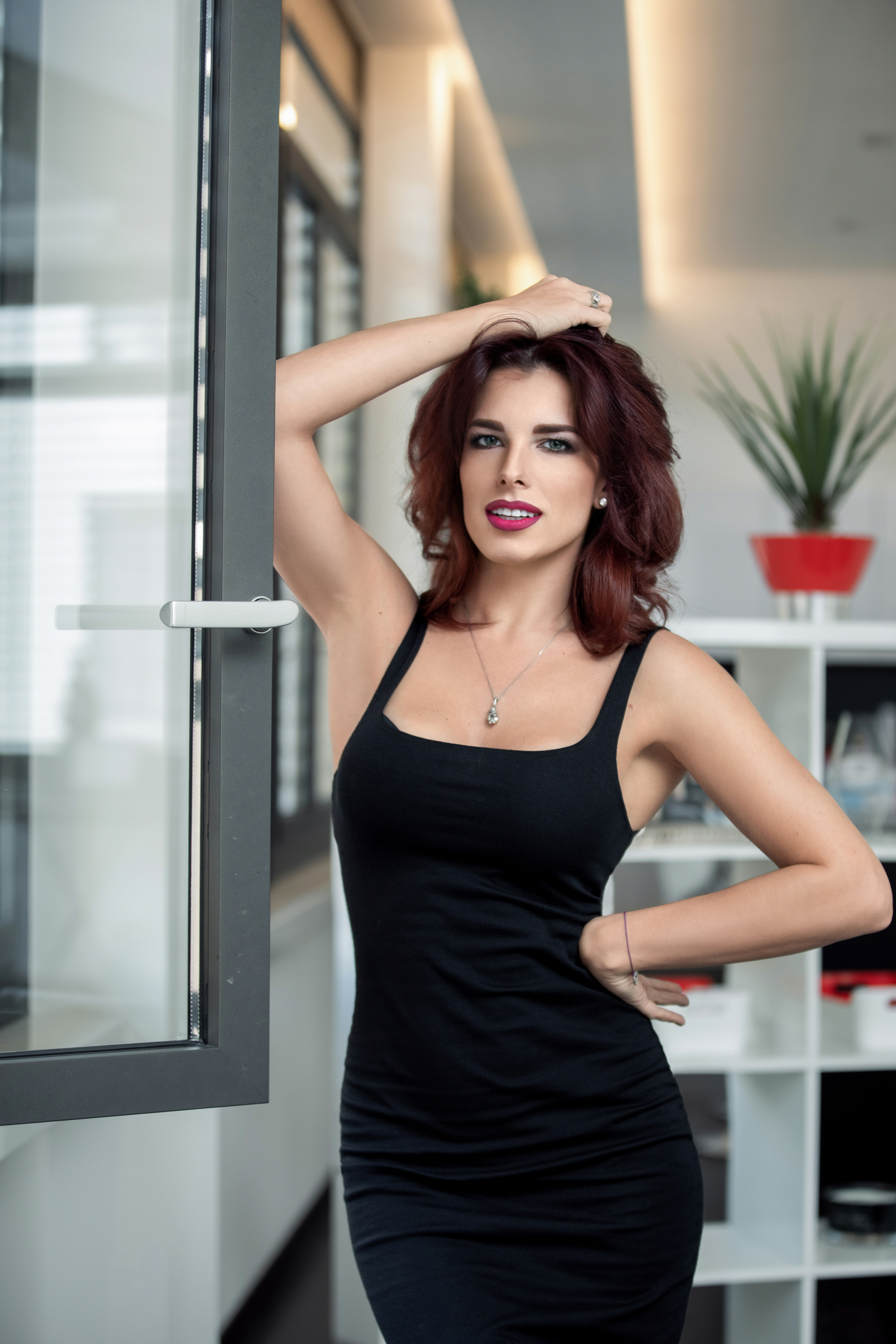
- Romanovskaya in 2017

Background information
- Born: Olga Serhiyivna Koryahina; Ольга Сергіївна Корягіна; January 22, 1986 (age 40); Mykolaiv, Mykolaiv Oblast, Ukrainian SSR (now Ukraine)
- Origin: Ukrainian
- Genres: Pop
- Occupations: Singer, television presenter, fashion designer, model
- Years active: 2006–2007 (group), 2007–present (solo)
- Formerly of: Nu Virgos
- Website: http://romanovskayaolga.com

Olga Romanovskaya (Ukrainian: Ольга Романовська), also known as Olga Koryahina (Ukrainian: Ольга Корягіна); born January 22, 1986, in Mykolaiv, Mykolaiv Oblast, Ukrainian SSRm is a Ukrainian singer, television presenter, fashion designer and model.

== Biography ==
As a student living in Mykolaiv, in 2006, Romanovska moved into the third year under the direction of the national university of Kyiv Culture and Art in the faculty of arts and crafts. She participated in exhibitions and photo shoots as a model to pay for her studies. In early 2006, the Nu Virgos group attended the funeral of Nadia Meiher who refused to participate further in the project. To replace her, a casting was organised at the wake and Koryahina decided to enter. To her surprise, she was chosen, but the vacant seat was taken by Khrystyna Kots-Hotlibm elected Miss Kyiv in 2003. After three months, the producers decided that it was not appropriate and they decided to give a chance to Romanovskaya. It formally integrated the group on April 10, 2006. Romanovskaya became popular as a new soloist in the group.

In March 2007, Romanovskaya announced her pregnancy and left the group. Her last appearance was on April 16. At the end of April that same year, she married the Ukrainian businessman Andriy Romanovskyi and at the beginning of September, she gave birth to a boy, named Max.

On 25 February 2022, Romanovskaya was arrested in Moscow after taking part in a protest against the 2022 Russian invasion of Ukraine.

== Discography ==
Album with Nu Virgos

- L.M.L. (2006)

Singles with Nu Virgos

- 2006 — "Л.М.Л."
- 2006 — "Цветок и нож"

Solo career

- 2007 — "Колыбельная"
- 2013 — Тайная любовь"
- 2013 — "Достучаться до неба"
- 2015 — "Держи меня крепче"
- 2016 — "Мало Малины" (feat. Dan Balan)
- 2017 — "Папайя"

Clip with Nu Virgos

Year	Clip	Director	Album
2006	Л.М.Л.	Alan Badoev	
2006	Цветок и нож	Alan Badoev	

Solo clips

Year	Clip	Director	Album
2007	Колыбельная		
2013	Тайная любовь	Kiril Kuzin	

Actress

Year	Clip	Director
2006	Без суеты (clip Valery Meladze)	Semen Horov
