= Yin-Yang (group) =

Russian-Ukrainian pop group

- Origin: Russia
- Genres: Pop
- Years active: 2007–2017, 2024-present
- Members: Artyom Ivanov; Tatiana Bogacheva; Sergey Ashikhmin
- Past members: Julia Parshuta (2007—2011)
- Website: (in Russian) Official website

Yin-Yang (Russian: Инь-Ян) is a Russian pop group. The group was a finalist in the seventh season of the Russian project Star Factory (Russian: Фабрика звёзд). The group's producer was Konstantin Meladze.

== Discography ==
=== Songs ===
Year	Original title	Translation	Music	Lyrics
2007	Мало-помалу (Malo-Pomalu)	Little By Little	K. Meladze	K. Meladze, D. Golde
2007	Сохрани меня (Sokhrani Menya)	Save Me	K. Meladze	K. Meladze
2008	Невесомо (Nevesomo) (originally a solo song sung by Tatiana Bogacheva)	Weightlessly	K. Meladze	K. Meladze, D. Golde
2008	Все мине (Vse Mine) (originally a solo song sung by Artyom Ivanov)	Everything Will Pass	K. Meladze	D. Golde
2008	Чёрная кошка (Chyornaya Koshka) (originally a solo song sung by Sergey Ashikhmin)	Black Cat	K. Meladze	K. Meladze
2008	Тая (Taya) (originally a solo song sung by Julia Parshuta)	Melting	K. Meladze	K. Meladze
2008	По встречной (Po Vstrechnoy) (originally a solo song sung by Artyom Ivanov)	In The Wrong Lane	D. Klimashenko	L. Basovich, T. Reshetnyak
2008	Если бы ты знала (Yesli By Ty Znala) (originally a solo song sung by Artyom Ivanov)	If You Only Knew	D. Klimashenko	L. Basovich, T. Reshetnyak
2008	Плюс и минус (Plyus I Minus) (originally a solo song sung by Sergey Ashikhmin)	Plus And Minus	K. Meladze	K. Meladze, D. Golde
2008	Всё сделала сама (Vsyo Sdelala Sama) (originally a solo song sung by Tatiana Bogacheva)	I've Done It All Myself	K. Meladze	K. Meladze, D. Golde
2008	Карма (Karma)	Karma	K. Meladze	K. Meladze
2009	Камикадзе (Kamikadze)	Kamikaze	K. Meladze	K. Meladze
2010	Пофиг (Pofig)	I Don't Give A Damn	K. Meladze	K. Meladze
2010	Не отпускай моей руки (Ne Otpuskay Moey Ruki)	Don't Let Go Of My Hand	K. Meladze	K. Meladze
2012	Инопланетянин (Inoplanetyanin)	Alien	K. Meladze	K. Meladze
2012	O Yeah!	—N/a	K. Meladze	K. Meladze
2013	Круто (Kruto)	Awesome	A. Ivanov	
2014	Таиланд (Tailand)	Thailand	A. Ivanov	
2015	Суббота (Subbota)	Saturday	A. Ivanov	
2015	Рассвет (Rassvet)	Dawn	A. Ivanov	
2015	Танцуй (Tantsui)	Dance	S. Ashikhmin	
2016	Мурашки (Murashki)	Goosebumps	A. Ivanov	
2017	Бесконечность (Beskonechnost')	Infinity	A. Ivanov	
2023	ЯНМБТ (YNMBT / Ya Ne Mogu Bez Tebya) (cover version of the song by Valery Meladze)	I Can't Live Without You	K. Meladze	
2024	Я не вернусь (Ya Ne Vernus') (cover version of the song by Nu Virgos)	I Won't Come Back	K. Meladze	
2024	Слушая мой голос (Slushaya Moy Golos)	Listening To My Voice	A. Ivanov	
2024	Между двух огней (Mezhdu Dvukh Ogney)	Between Two Flames	S. Ashikhmin, V. Tkachenko	
