= Dasha Medova =

Ukrainian singer (born 1990)

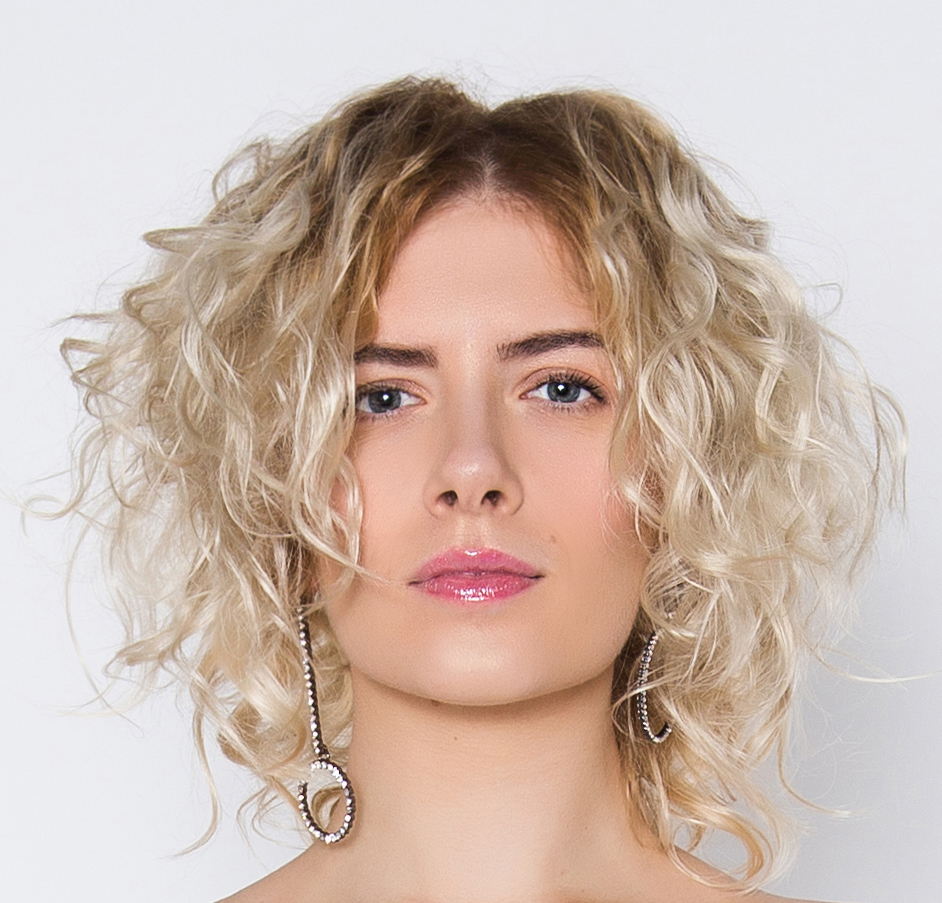
- Born: 23 October 1990; Kherson, Kherson Oblast, Ukrainian SSR, Soviet Union
- Disappeared: 24 September 2018 (aged 27); Ukraine
- Status: Missing for 8 years and 18 days
- Other name: Mira Kulum
- Occupations: Singer; songwriter; actress; TV presenter; model
- Spouse: Oleksandr Shvets (divorced)
- Children: 1
- Musical career
- Genres: Pop; Pop rock; Bossa nova
- Instrument: Vocals
- Labels: Mamamusic; Moon Records Ukraine; UMIG

Darya Volodymyrivna Kobets (Ukrainian: Дар'я Володимирівна Кобець; 23 October 1990 – missing since 24 September 2018), known professionally as Dasha Medova and later Mira Kulum, is a Ukrainian singer, songwriter, actress, TV presenter and model. She was a member of Dmytro Kostyuk's version of Nu Virgos from 2013 to 2014. She disappeared without a trace in 2018.

== Musical career ==
=== 2013–2014: Nu Virgos ===
After Konstantin Meladze announced the closure of the band in January 2013, the former general producer of the group Dmytro Kostyuk, who owned the rights to the «VIA Gra» brand and related rights to the repertoire of the group recorded during collaboration with the Sony Music label, in January began casting a new line-up of the group independently of Meladze.

On 15 October 2013, a presentation of the new line-up of the group took place in Moscow, where Medova was presented as one of the participants. On 18 October, a presentation was held in Kyiv. In December 2013, their debut single was released as part of a group called «Магия». The author of this composition was Alexey Malakhov. Also in December 2013, the group took part in the New Year 's show the First National channel. In 2014, the band was going to present an album called «Магия», but for certain reasons, the release never took place. On 24 March 2014, it became known that Medova and Aina Vilberh had left the band.

=== 2014–2018: Mira Kulum ===
After leaving Nu Virgos, Medova returned to her solo career under the new stage name Mira Kulum. She released several new Ukrainian-language compositions, participated in charity events for orphans and children from the ATO zone. In March 2015, Medova presented the first single "Vidlitayu" for the future Ukrainian-language album. The song was written jointly with one of the authors of the Kvartal-95 Studio, Vadim Pereverzev. Along with the new track, Medova also presented a video clip, directed by herself. On 19 November 19 of the same year, her solo concert entitled "I'm 25" took place. That evening, nine new compositions in Ukrainian were performed.

== Personal life and disappearance ==
For several years, Medova was married to businessman Oleksandr Shvets, and on 25 November 2011 she gave birth to a daughter, Varvara. The divorce of the couple turned out to be scandalous as Medova accused the Shvets of assaulting her in which the latter denied. A fierce struggle unfolded over who the daughter would live with. On 26 September 2018, a hearing on this case was held in the Svyatoshinsky Court of Kyiv. However, Medova did not appear in court. In January 2019, it became known from the personal account of Volodymy Kobets, Medova's father, that she disappeared in the summer, and the search on her own was unsuccessful, therefore, since 24 September 2018, she has been on the official declared missing. According to Shvets, she is no longer alive.

== Discography ==
- 2012 — Dasha Medova

== Filmography ==
Year	Title	Role	Notes
2011	Inspektor	Masha	Short film
