= Aina Vilberh =

Ukrainian singer (born 1985)

- Айна Вільберг
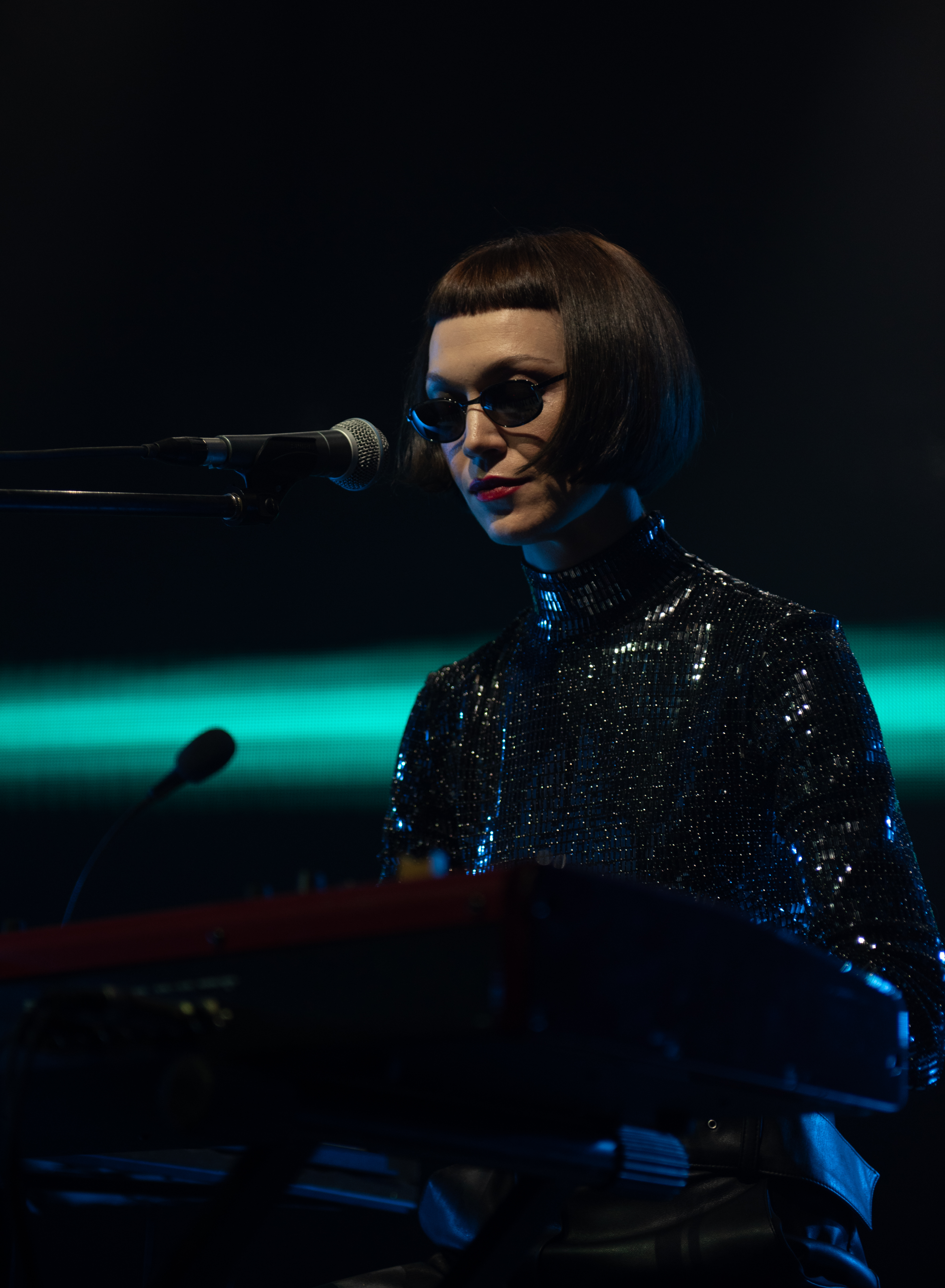
- Vilberh in 2021
- Born: Olena Zinoviyivna Bilous; 10 January 1985 (age 41); Kakhovka, Ukrainian SSR, Soviet Union
- Other name: Satory Seine
- Citizenship: Soviet Union (1985–1991); Ukraine (1991–present)
- Occupations: Singer; songwriter; music teacher; actress
- Years active: 2000–present
- Musical career
- Genres: Pop; electronica; rock
- Instruments: Vocals; piano
- Labels: Send Records; Best Music; 4udotvorec
- Formerly of: Bazza-R, Etwas Unders, Nu Virgos

Signature
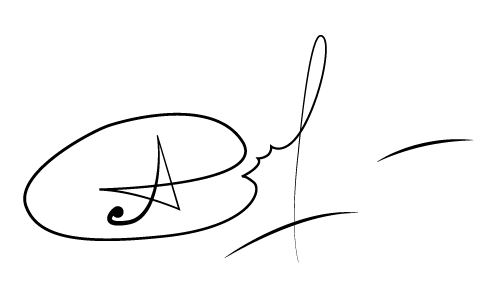

Aina Zinoviyivna Vilberh (Note: In this name that follows East Slavic naming customs, the patronymic is Zinoviyivna and the family name is Vilberh.; Ukrainian: Айна Зіновіївна Вільберг, pronounced [ˈɑjnɐ z⁽ʲ⁾iˈnɔwijiu̯nɐ ˈwilʲberɦ]; Russian: Айна Зиновьевна Вильберг, romanised: Aina Zinovievna Vilberg) (born Olena Zinoviyivna Bilous; (Note: Ukrainian: Олена Зіновіївна Білоус) 10 January 1985) is a Ukrainian singer, songwriter, vocal teacher and actress.

== Life and career ==
=== 1985–2000: Early life ===
Aina Vilberh was born Olena Zinoviyivna Bilous in Kakhovka on 10 January 1985. She attended the R. Glier Kyiv Institute of Music from 2002 to 2006, majoring in pop vocals. Vilberh participated in musical groups of various directions — from classical to nu-metal. She teaches singing in a speech position according to the method of Seth Riggs, considering this method of voice production the best and shortest way to vocal success. In parallel, he is developing his own singing school based on the liberation of the voice through the emancipation of the body. She has worked as a vocal coach in such television projects as Fabryka Zirok, ShoumaStgouon, with the Azerbaijani talent show Big Stage, in the international reality show Хочу V ВИА Гру (I Want To Be In Nu Virgos), and also prepared participants for Eurovision in Baku in 2013. The Voice of Ukraine is one of the last television projects in which she actively worked with participants from the teams of Svyatoslav Vakarchuk and Ani Lorak. She studied with the group Nu Virgos, as well as many stars and talents of Ukraine.

=== 2000–2004: Bazza-R ===
In 2000, Aina Vilberh joined a group called the Звуковой барьер (Zvukovoi barer) until 2002. Later, the band changed its name to Bazza-R. According to the band members, their music is "lighter than hard rock and heavier than pop rock".

On 29–30 June 2003 in Kyiv, on Kontraktova Square, the musicians took part in the IX All-Ukrainian Youth Festival Perlyny sezonu, where the band was presented in the nomination rock music, and received a diploma of the festival.

On 1 May 2004 in Kakhovka, under the patronage of the President of Ukraine Leonid Kuchma and with the support of the Ministry of Culture and Arts of Ukraine, the 13th International Festival Tavriyski Ihr was held, where the Bazza-R group also took part. The musicians performed five compositions in Ukrainian where performing songs live was a requirement for the participants.

=== 2004–2006: Etwas Unders ===
Since 2004, Vilberh has been a member of the alternative group Etwas Unders. Aina replaced the vocalist Tatiana, who left after a creative difference with the band. The girl was noticed and positively evaluated at the concert of her still existing group in the house of culture «NTUU KPI». In the new line-up, Etwas Unders updates the vocal parts for the previous songs and begins to prepare other material.

For two years of its existence, the band has given concerts in almost all regional centers of Ukraine. One of the main festival achievements was the first prize at the Taras Bulba rock festival, as well as the title of the Best Alternative Band of Ukraine 2006 according to the festival the Global Battle of the Bands.

In 2006, all the qualifying rounds of the world competition the Global Battle of the Bands 2006 were successfully completed and Ukraine was presented at the final concert at the Astoria Concert Hall in London.

The recording of their debut album started in mid-2006 with a release planned for that October. However, his appearance was postponed for later. After the end of the band's active concert period, Aina left the band, deciding to conceptually change the creative direction and abandon the negativity and aggression that the band partially expressed in their songs.

=== 2006–2012: Satory Seine ===
Aina started her solo career under the pseudonym Satory Seine in 2006 together with the author of most of her tracks DJ and producer DJ Noiz, both artists work with the label «Send Records». Satory Seine is seriously passionate about Eastern philosophy. The singer boldly transfers her knowledge and practices of Zen Buddhism into creativity. On 7 April 2007, Satory Seine debuted in front of a club audience. The first performance of the vocalist took place within the framework of the Live & Famous project, together with Dutch DJ and producer Eddy Good. During the performance, the CD «Live & Famous» was successfully presented, in the recording of which Eddy Good and Satory Seine took part.

A girl with a frankly «non-format» song in English opened the concert «Songs of the Year». On 4 December 2007, DJ Sender and Satory Seine at the main concert venue of the country in the palace «Ukraine» at the gala concert «Zolota Sharmanka» present their first joint house composition «I Love You», which was recognized as the breakthrough of the year. This track managed to achieve a balance between club electronic and pop music. Rhythmic hits with the voice of Satory Seine are regularly heard on the radio stations Kiss FM, Renaissance, Sharmanka, DJ FM. Also this year she performed at the gala concert of the award ceremony of the best representatives of Ukrainian dance culture «Ukrainian Dance Music Awards», the vocalist performed her first track in the style of vocal progressive - «Sparkle Of Truth», recorded in collaboration with DJ Kex, and for the first time the composition «Gentle Motive», written jointly, was presented to a wide audience with the talented composer of the Send Records label DJ Noiz. This was followed by a joint performance with Dj Sender at the TopDJ award ceremony, where the works «Kiss You» and the first song in the artist's repertoire in Russian «Мой друг» were presented. This is followed by no less successful works in tandem with Dj Noiz: «Beautiful Story», «Vanity Of Vanities». Later, together with Drive Dealers, they create tracks «Addiction», «Space Migrator», «We Can Talk».

The work of Satory Seine in 2007 with the Ukrainian electronic duo 2Special brings results in the form of such works as «I Think», «Dance On The Cloud» and «One Love». In the Trend chart of the Kiss FM radio station, the song «Dance On The Cloud» occupied the top positions for several weeks. Singer Satory Seine appeared on the pages of the November issue of the Ukrainian edition of Elle magazine. In 2008, DJ Romantic, a resident of the «Arena club», together with Andi Vah and Satory Seine recorded the track «Next Kiss». Drive Dealers and Satory Seine are composing a new song called «April» at this time. During the DJMag start party, the premiere of the joint track «Space Migrator» by Satory Seine and Drive Dealers took place for an audience of thousands. On 5 November, the final stage of shooting the video clip for the song «Gentle motive» took place. The producers of the video were the CEO of the label «Send Records» Yevgeny Yevtukhov and the director of the singer Mikhail Malyi.

In 2009, Satory Seine returned to the Ukrainian dance scene with a new track «Lazy Girl», performed together with the popular French house star Muttonheads. Muttonheads invited Satory to work with him in the creation of a new work. The author of the text was Mike.M. The recording of the singer's vocal part took place at the Send Records studio. The release of Lazy Girl (Ugostar & Daxto) took place on the popular French label «ZERO1». At the beginning of the summer of 2009, the singer recorded several remixes together with the Ukrainian DJ Jim Pavloff, and the two of them performed as a live project at the Global Gathering Ukraine festival, where they performed the track «Solaris». In 2009, a CD album was released, recorded together with Sergey Lyubinsky (Knob), the guitarist of the band TOL, called «Palne». The album includes 12 tracks. Further in 2010, the singer creates a joint project with producer, DJ and booking agent, co-owner of Dj Boutique booking agency — Waris concert agency, which was named «Risky Doubt». The girls together with Israeli producer Matti Caspi recorded two tracks «Don't be cruel» and «And sometimes». The songs were released on the radio stations «Pacha Recordings» and «Enormous Tunes». In 2011, she released her debut solo English-language album, called «Day», which included 12 songs.

In 2012, the singer together with musician Alexander Shulga created an exclusively studio project «Core Yatis», designed for nine tracks, — says the ideological inspirer Alexander Shulga about the collective and its release. The concept of «Core Yatis» is tied to the concept of the nine planets of the Solar System. Most of the songs are written in a fictional language, several English compositions and one in Russian. The record of the same name with the name of the collective included nine compositions in which analog synthesizers, beats, orchestral and ethnic instruments decorated with vocals were intertwined. The musical style of the album consists of a combination of trip-hop, downtempo, inditronics and a slight sprinkling of ethnic motifs. The official release in the iTunes Store took place on 23 July 2013. The recording of the material took place in the capital studio of Vitaly Telezin «211 Recording», and the mastering of the record was done in the Bristol studio «Optimum Mastering».

In parallel, the girl starred in a movie. She made her debut in the short film directed by Denis Spolitak «Між 20 й опівночі» (Between 20 and midnight), where she played the role of a hooligan girl. The premiere of the film took place at the Kyiv International Film Festival "Molodist", which was held in Kyiv on 20–28 October 2012. In 2013, Aina Vilberh starred in a dramatic short film about love, which was called «R3», where she played the main female role. The film was directed by Alexander Lidagovsky.

=== 2013–2014: Nu Virgos ===
After Konstantin Meladze announced the closure of the band in January 2013, the former general producer of the group Dmytro Kostyuk, who owned the rights to the «VIA Gra» brand and related rights to the repertoire of the group recorded during collaboration with the Sony Music label, in January began casting a new line-up of the group independently of Meladze.

Aina Vilberh did not pass the traditional casting, she was a music teacher and gave vocal lessons to the already formed duo of the Nu Virgos group, which included Dasha Medova and Dasha Rostova. On 15 October 2013, a presentation of the new line-up of the group took place in Moscow, where Aina was presented as one of the participants. On 18 October, a presentation was held in Kyiv. In December 2013, Aina's debut single was released as part of a group called «Магия». The author of this composition was Alexey Malakhov. Also in December 2013, the group took part in the New Year 's show the First National channel. In 2014, the band was going to present an album called «Магия», but for certain reasons, the release never took place. On 24 March 2014, it became known that Dasha Medova and Aina Vilberh had left the band. However, what exactly caused the departure, the artist preferred not to say.

=== 2014–present ===
After leaving the band «Nu Virgos», Aina creates a new project «AINA» together with Nikita Budash, known for the Ukrainian electro-punk band Dead Boys Girlfriend, which combines electronic arrangements, guitar and vocal parts. On 10 June 2015, the duo presented their debut EP «Portal», which included 5 Russian-language compositions, produced by Konstantin Kostenko. As the musicians themselves say, they managed to create their own calm, very personal world, which they share through the "portal" of Nikita's guitar mantras and Aina's spatial, but with a slight strain of vocals.

I have been looking for myself in music for a long time and have tried a lot of different genres and styles. And finally, I found myself in this project.

— Aina talks about her project

The debut live performance of the new project took place on 14 June 2015 at the GreenLight Festival music Festival.

On 8 July 2016, the premiere of a new composition called «Zveroboj» took place on the «Prosto Radio» program «STEREOBAZA». On 9 December 2016, the premiere of the author's work of the singer «Ландыши» took place on the iTunes Store and Google Play portals. The music was created by the creative union of the talents of musician Alexey Drizzit and the Gulfstream String Quartet. 10 days after the premiere of the single, the official release of the singer's video clip, directed by Ubik Litvin, took place. On 26 December, the premiere of the single «У меня была мечта» took place on the music service for free listening «SoundCloud». The recording of the song took place in one of the recording studios in Kyiv — «Komora». The song is written by Aina, — music and lyrics. Oleg Pashkovsky helped to arrange the musical accompaniment beautifully, performing the piano part, and Konstantin Kostenko was engaged in mixing and mastering.

On 14 February 2017, Valentine's Day, the singer presented her new song in tandem with the finalist of the seventh season of the show «X-Factor» Alexander Yupatov — «Narechena».

== Awards and achievements ==
Award	Year	Category	Recipient(s) and nominee(s)	Result
Global Battle of the Bands	2006	The best alternative collective of Ukraine	Etwas Unders	Won
Global Gathering Ukraine	2009	Laureate of the festival	Satory Seine	Won
Perlyny sezonu	2003	Rock music	Bazza-R	Nominated
Taras Bulba	2006	First Prize	Etwas Unders	Won
Ukrainian Dance Music Awards	2007	The best vocal project of Ukraine	Satory Seine	Won
Zolota Sharmanka	2007	Breakthrough of the Year	Satory Seine	Won

== Discography ==
- Etwas Unders (2007)
- Пальне (2009)
- Day (2011)
- Core Yatis (2013)
- Шесть жизней назад (2015)
- Portal (2015)
- Суша (2017)
- Колокольчик (2021)
- Цветочный альбом (2021)

== Filmography ==
Title	Year	Role	Director	Notes
Між 20 й опівночі / Between 20 and midnight	2012	The Hooligan Girl	Denis Spolitak	Short film
R3	2013	Unknown	Alexander Lidagovsky	Short film
Ваяна / Moana	2016	Sina (voice)	John Musker / Ron Clements	Ukrainian dubbing
Мері Поппінс повертається / Mary Poppins Returns	2018	Mary Poppins (voice)	Rob Marshall	Ukrainian dubbing
UglyDolls. Ляльки з характером / UglyDolls	2019	Mandy (voice)	Kelly Asbury	Ukrainian dubbing
AINA. Interview	2019	Herself	Marina Rybalko	Short film

== Sources ==
- Максим Сысоенко (30 July 2004). "От барьера до BAZZA-Rа". Новый фаворит.
