= Zbruchivka =

Village in Khmelnytskyi Oblast, Ukraine

Zbruchivka Збручівка
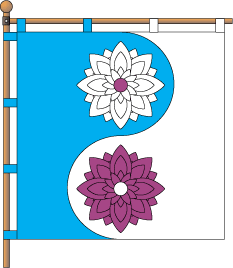
- Zbruchivka prapor

- Location of Zbruchivka Zbruchivka (Ukraine)
- Coordinates: 49°39′03″N 26°16′14″E
- Country: Ukraine
- Oblast: Khmelnytskyi Oblast
- Raion: Khmelnytskyi Raion
- Hromada: Volochysk urban hromada
- Elevation: 291 m (955 ft)

Population (2001)
  - Total: 44
- Postal code: 31211
- Area code: +380 3845
- Climate: Cfa

Zbruchivka (Ukrainian: Збручівка) is a village located in Khmelnytskyi Raion, (Note: Before the 2020 Ukraine administrative reform the place was part of the Volochysk Raion.) Khmelnytskyi Oblast (province) of western Ukraine.

== History ==
Founded in 1845, the village is located on the left bank of the Zbruch River, a historically significant waterway that once demarcated the boundary between the Austro-Hungarian and Russian Empires.

== Notable people ==
- Nadia Meiher
