= No (Meladze song) =

2012 song by Konstantin Meladze feat. Polina Gagarina

"No" is a song written by Konstantin Meladze and performed by Russian singer Polina Gagarina for her third studio album. The composition, produced by Meladze, was released as a single on August 13, 2012.

The song received positive reviews from music critics and won an award for Best Music Video at the RU.TV Awards 2013.

== Background and release ==
The composition was first performed publicly on August 4, 2012, at a concert in Ryazan as part of the environmental event "Clean City Day".

== Critical reception ==
Pavel Pshenov from MuseCube.org gave the song a positive review, rating it 4.5 out of 5. "If the song repeats the decent results of '[The Show is Over]', it will be expected; if it exceeds them — it will enter the 'golden fund' of domestic pop music as a non-banal and somewhat outstanding work," noted the author.

At the RU.TV Awards 2013, "No" received two nominations: Best Song and Best Music Video. The composition won in the latter category.

== Music video ==
The music video for the song was shot in July 2012. The director was Alan Badoev. The video was released on August 31, 2012, on the Ello channel (YouTube).

== Track listing ==
No.	Title	Writer(s)	Length
1.	"No"	Konstantin Meladze	3:56

== Charts ==
Country/Region (Chart)	Peak position
CIS (Tophit General Top-100)	3
CIS (Tophit Top-100 by Requests)	4
Russia (Tophit Russian Top-100)	10
Russia (Tophit Moscow Top-100)	16
Russia (Tophit St. Petersburg Top-100)	17
Ukraine (Tophit Ukrainian Top-100)	1
Ukraine (Tophit Kyiv Top-100)	2
Latvia	5

== Awards and nominations ==
Year	Award	Nominated work	Category	Result
2013	RU.TV Awards	"No"	Best Song	Nominated
2013	RU.TV Awards	"No"	Best Music Video	Won
