= Alexandra Ivanovskaya =

Russian model

- Born: Alexandra Ivanovskaya; 1989 (age 36–37); Komsomolsk-on-Amur, Soviet Union
- Height: 1.80 m (5 ft 11 in)
- Beauty pageant titleholder
- Title: Miss Russia 2005 (Winner)
- Hair color: Brown
- Eye color: Green

Alexandra Ivanovskaya (Russian: Александра Ивановская) was born in Komsomolsk-on-Amur, Soviet Union in 1989. She was crowned "Miss Russia 2005" in Moscow on 22 December. During the beauty pageant, she represented her city, Khabarovsk Alexandra defeated 50 contestants from around the country for the crown.

Preceded by Diana Zaripova	Miss Russia; 2005	Succeeded by Tatiana Kotova
