= Tatiana Naynik =

Russian singer (born 1978)

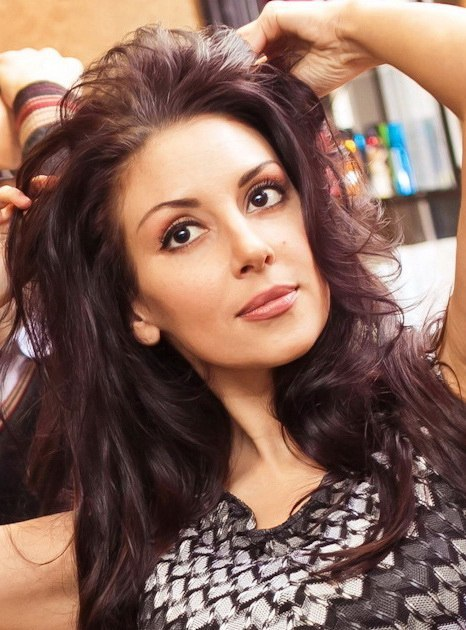

Background information
- Born: Tatiana Borisovna Naynik; 6 April 1978 (age 48); Leningrad, Russian SFSR, Soviet Union (now Russia)
- Origin: Russia
- Genre: Pop
- Occupations: Singer; actress; model; producer
- Formerly of: Nu Virgos

Tatiana Borisovna Naynik (Russian: Татьяна Борисовна Найник; born 6 April 1978) is a Russian singer, actress, model, and producer. She was a former member of the Ukrainian girl group Nu Virgos.

== Singing career ==
=== «VIA Gra» ===
In early 2002, Tatiana becomes the participant of group "VIA Gra", gone on maternity leave Nadezhda Granovskaya. Soon will be released the first clip with her participation — "Стоп! Стоп! Стоп!". The first performance of the composition with Tatiana in front of a wide audience took place on 23 may in the Moscow concert hall "Russia" ceremony of delivery of the award "ovation", where the team was represented in the nomination "Best youth performer of dance music". In July was reissued album "Attempt number 5", which included remixes of existing songs, as well as a new group, "Stop! Stop! Stop!". On 20 July, the band performed in the framework of the international competition "Slavic Bazaar". In August 2002, were recorded two new songs — "Убей мою подругу" and "Good morning, папа!". Soon it was announced that the next single will be one of these songs and in September they filmed a video on it. In the end, there was a preference for "Good morning, папа!". At the same time, Nadezhda Granovskaya returned to the team. September 12, finished shooting the video for the song "Good morning, Papa!", thus in the music video starred 4 of the soloist. Before leaving Tatiana, the band performed several gigs in a Quartet. In November the team consisting of Alain — Tatiana — Anna appeared on the cover of the Russian edition of men's magazine "Maxim". At the same time Tatiana had left the group. After leaving there were problems with producers.

=== Maybe ===
After the departure from "VIA Gra", Tatiana started her own group "Maybe", where she performs as a group member and producer. The co-producer of the group was Peter Hoffman, a friend of Tatiana Nainik. As the main creator of the musical material for the ensemble was an American composer Robbie Nevil, and the author of the lyrics is Lara D'elia. Initially, the group emerged in the form of a Duo, composed of Tatiana Nainik and Diana Nikolaeva. Together the girls recorded a few songs. In October, the band appeared on the pages of the Russian edition of men's magazine "Maxim". In late 2006. the band was joined by new singer, Alevtina Belyaeva, and later the replacement came Diana Natalia Redhead.

== Acting career ==
In 2014, Tatiana Nainik starred in the television series "Swati", which premiered on 14 April 2014, on the TV channel "Home".

== Discography ==
With Nu Virgos

- Popytka No. 5 (2002)

Singles

- Признание
- Поиграй со мной в любовь
- Кто ты?
- Не дано
- Небо и земля
- Мёд и лёд
- Осталась
- Обо мне
- I am, are you
- Скучаю
- Малиновое сердце

== Music videos ==
- music
  - as member of the group Nu Virgos
    - 2002: Стоп! Стоп! Стоп!
    - 2002: Good morning, папа!

== Filmography ==
- 2014: Сватьи
