= Potselui =

2007 compilation album by Nu Virgos

Compilation album by Nu Virgos
- Released: November 1, 2007
- Recorded: 2000–2007
- Genres: Dance-pop, pop rock, teen pop
- Length: 73:10
- Languages: Russian; Ukrainian (in 1 track)
- Labels: Monolit Records, Pony Crayon
- Producers: Konstantin Meladze; Dmitry Kostyuk; Arina Abramova

Nu Virgos chronology
L.M.L. (2007)	Potselui (2007)	Emancipation (2008)

Singles from Potselui
- 1. "Obmani, no ostansya" Released: March 2006; 2. "L.M.L." Released: June 2006; 3. "Tsvetok i nozh" Released: November 2006; 4. "Potselui" Released: 2 September 2007

Potselui (Russian: Поцелуи, Kisses) is the second compilation album by Nu Virgos.

== Track listing ==
Original 2007 release
No.	Title	Length
1.	"Potselui" (Поцелуи, lit. Kisses)	4:17
2.	"Brillianty" (Бриллианты, lit. Diamonds)	3:25
3.	"Tsvetok i nozh" (Цветок и нож, lit. Flower & knife)	4:50
4.	"Ne ostavlyay menya ljubimiy" (Не оставляй меня любимый, lit. Don't ever leave me love)	3:30
5.	"Obmani, no ostansya" (Обмани, но останься, lit. Tell me lie, but don't leave me)	3:57
6.	"Vot taki dela" (Вот таки дела, lit. This is the situation)	3:35
7.	"L.M.L." (Л.М.Л., lit. L.M.L.)	4:06
8.	"Popytka No. 5" (Попытка No. 5, lit. Endeavor No. 5)	3:22
9.	"Ya ne ponyala" (Я не поняла, lit. I don't understand)	3:42
10.	"Biologiya" (Биология, lit. Biology)	3:42
11.	"Stop! Stop! Stop! (album version)" (Стоп! Стоп! Стоп! (альбомная версия), lit. Stop! Stop! Stop!)	3:46
12.	"Producer" (Продюсер, lit. Producer)	4:00
13.	"V etom ty professor" (В этом ты профессор, lit. You are professor in that)	3:54
14.	"Okean i tri reki (feat. Valeriy Meladze)" (Окен и три реки (совместно с Валерием Меладзе), lit. Ocean & three rivers)	3:36
15.	"Ubey moyu podrugu" (Убей мою подругу, lit. Kill my girlfriend)	3:43
16.	"Prityazhenya bolshe net (feat. Valeriy Meladze)" (Притяженья больше нет (совместно с Валерием Меладзе), lit. No attraction anymore)	4:18
17.	"Poznakomsya s moyey mamoy" (Познакомься с моей мамой, Lit. Let me introduce my Mama)	3:35
18.	"Net nichego khuzhe (feat. TNMK)" (Нет ничего хуже (совместно с ТНМК), lit. No anything worst)	3:40
19.	"Obnimi menya" (Обними меня, lit. Hold me closer)	3:53

== Release history ==
Country	Release date
Russia	November 1, 2007
Ukraine	November 1, 2007
