= Olga Meganskaya =

Russian singer and model (born 1992)

Olga Meganskaya Ольга Меганская
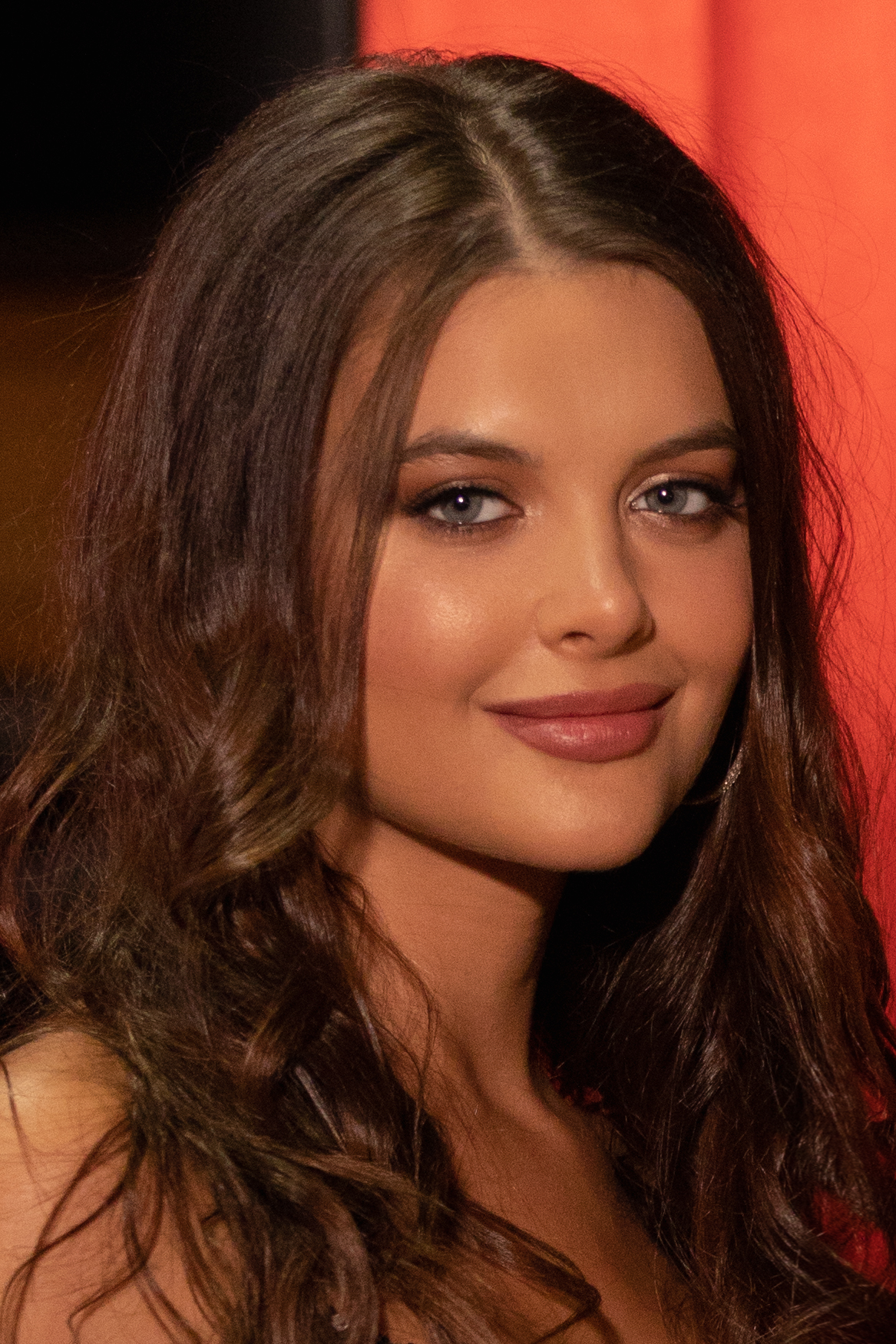
- Born: Olga Borisovna Meganskaya; 6 March 1992 (age 34); Yaroslavl, Russia
- Occupations: Singer; Model
- Years active: 2017–present
- Height: 1.70 m (5 ft 7 in)
- Musical career
- Genres: Pop
- Instrument: Vocals
- Label: Meladze Music (2018–2020)
- Formerly of: Nu Virgos (2018–2020)

Olga Borisovna Meganskaya (Russian: Ольга Борисовна Меганская; born: 6 March 1992) is a Russian singer, model and former member of Ukrainian girl group Nu Virgos.

== Life and career ==
Meganskaya was born on 6 March 1992 in Yaroslavl. In parallel with her studies in elementary school, Meganskaya took piano and solo classes, and after receiving her diploma, she was admitted to the Faculty of Musical Art of the House of Music of Saint Petersburg State University. Meganskaya took part in numerous singing contests and had won more than once. Meganskaya started her career as a singer by performing in restaurants and bars, as well as festivals and other events. She took part in auditions for the 6th season of the popular singing contest The Voice in the summer of 2017, but none of the coaches chose her.

=== 2018–2020: Nu Virgos ===
In March 2018, through a private casting, she replaced Misha Romanova in Nu Virgos. Nu Virgos released three official singles with Meganskaya as part of the group; "Я Полюбила Монстра" (I Was In Love With A Monster), "ЛюбоЛь" (LovePain) and "1+1".

On 16 October 2020, Meganskaya announced that she was leaving the group.

=== 2021–present ===
After her departure from Nu Virgos, Meganskaya started working as a model and as a singer at private events. In April 2022, Meganskaya posted on her Instagram account that she had signed a contract with a worldwide model agency. On 22 August, Meganskaya announced her debut solo concert in Saint-Petersburg, that was scheduled for 27 August.

== Discography ==
=== Singles ===
==== As part of Nu Virgos ====
Year	Title	English translation	Album
2018	Я Полюбила Монстра	I Loved A Monster	Non-album singles
2019	ЛюбоЛь	LovePain	Non-album singles
2019	1+1		Non-album singles
