= Meseda Bagaudinova =

Russian singer (born 1983)

Meseda Bagaudinova Меседа Багаудинова
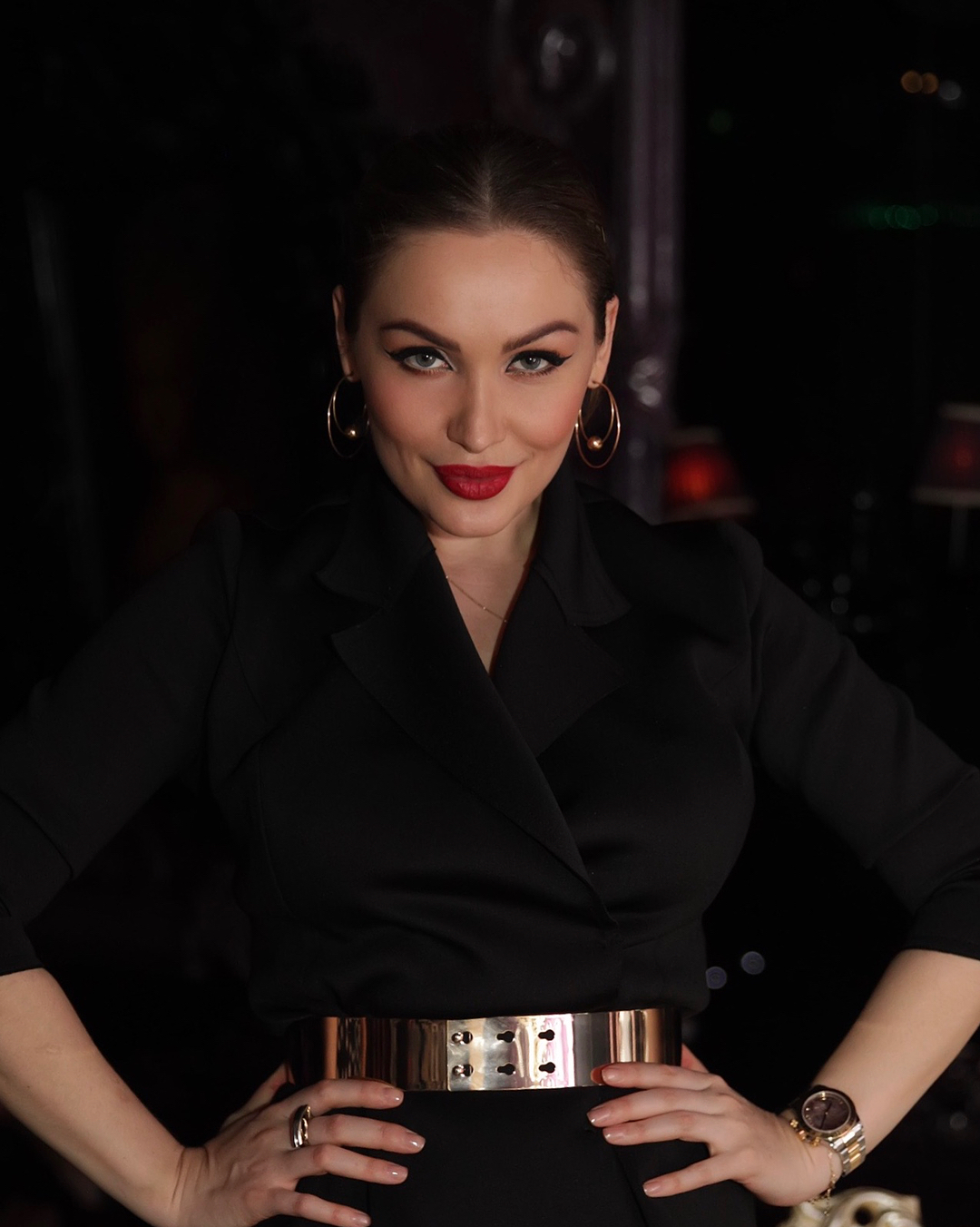
- Bagaudinova in 2018

Background information
- Born: Meseda Abdullarisovna Bagaudinova; 30 October 1983 (age 43); Grozny, RSFSR, Soviet Union (now Russia)
- Genre: Pop
- Occupations: Singer; actress
- Years active: 2007–present
- Formerly of: Nu Virgos

Meseda Abdullarisovna Bagaudinova (Note: In this name that follows East Slavic naming customs, the patronymic is Abdullarisovna and the family name is Bagaudinova.) (Russian: Меседа Абдулларисовна Багаудинова; born 30 October 1983) is a Russian singer and actress. She is former member of the Ukrainian girl group Nu Virgos.

== Early life ==
Meseda Abdullarisovna Bagaudinova was born in Grozny, Chechnya, to an Avar father and a Ukrainian-Belarusian mother.

She graduated from the Rostov-on-Don State College of Arts majoring in stage and jazz vocal. Then she performed as a vocalist in the Rostov pop-group "Dreams".

In 2005, she entered GITIS (Vladimir Nazarov's course).

After graduating from GITIS, Bagaudinova tried her luck in auditions for a popular TV show but she didn't make it and was turned down.

== Career ==
=== Nu Virgos ===
Bagaudinova joined Nu Virgos on 1 April 2007 and in about three weeks, on 21 April, she made her debut at a concert in London.

She was introduced as the new member of the group to the larger public at the Muz-TV premiere, on 1 June 2007.

She made her debut in the video clip 'Kiss'.

While Bagaudinova was in the group, it released 2 CDs, 4 videoclips (Kiss, I'm Not Afraid, My Emancipation, American Wife), and won awards for best pop group, best video clip, best song, and more.

Bagaudinova was ranked 26th in the list of "100 Sexiest Girls of 2008" of the magazine Maxim.

On 19 January 2009, Bagaudinova's removal from the group Nu Virgos was announced following the return of former founder member, Nadezhda Granovskaya.

=== Comeback ===
Bagaudinova is planning to start a solo career in September 2009, with the help of her former producers, Dmytro Kostyuk and Konstantin Meladze.

== Personal life ==
In the summer of 2011, Bagaudinova married a businessman named Alan. On 6 January 2012, she gave birth to a son. In 2015, she filed for divorce.
