= Nadia Meiher =

Ukrainian singer and songwriter (born 1982)

Nadia Meiher Надія Мейхер
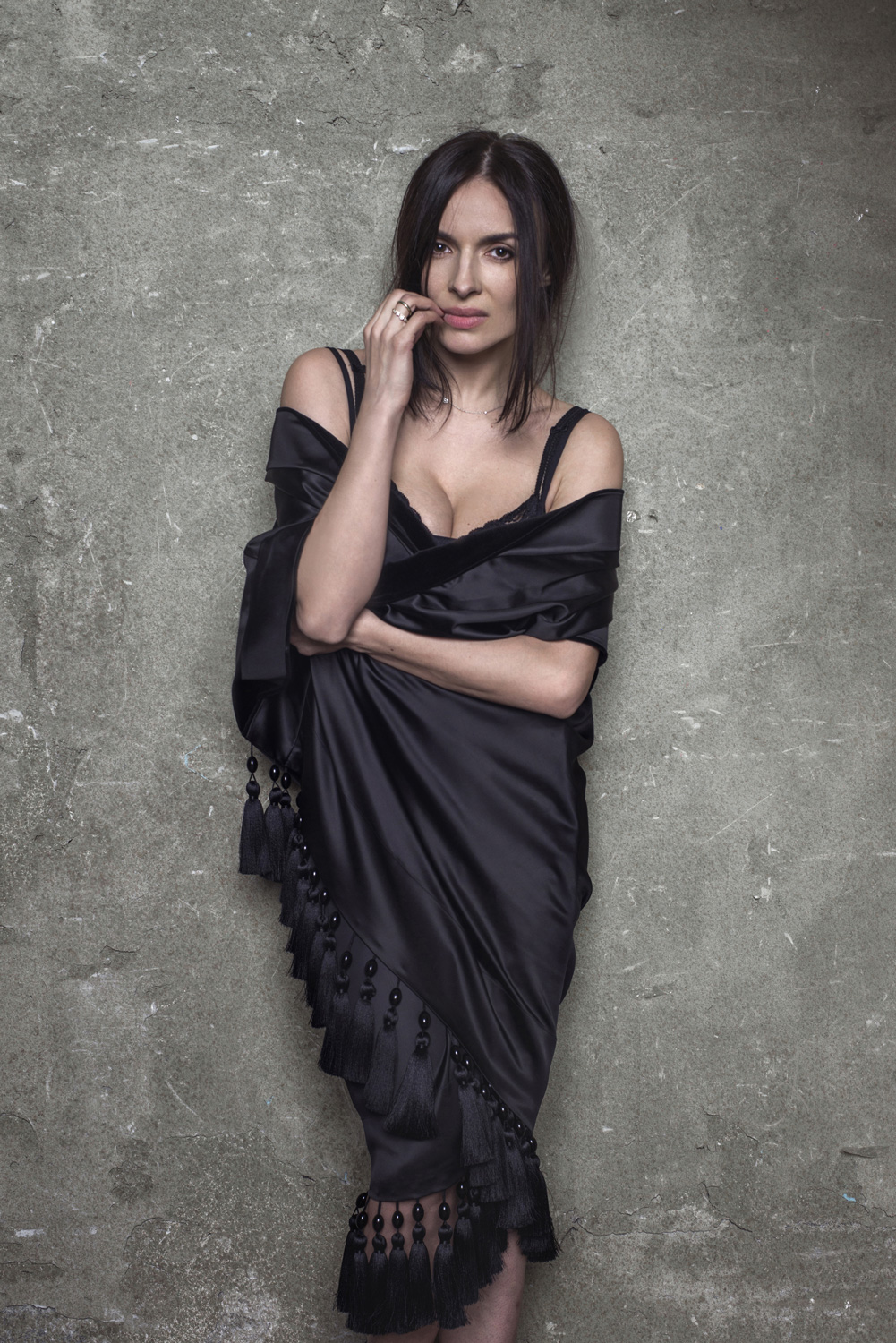
- Meiher in 2016

Background information
- Also known as: Nadezhda Granovskaya
- Born: Nadiya Oleksandrivna Meikher; 10 April 1982 (age 44); Zbruchivka, Ukrainian SSR, Soviet Union
- Origin: Kyiv, Ukraine
- Genre: Russian pop
- Occupations: Singer; songwriter; actress
- Years active: 2000–present
- Formerly of: Nu Virgos (until 2011)
- Spouse: Mikhail Urzhumtsev (m. 2014)

Nadiya Oleksandrivna Urzhumtseva (Ukrainian: Надія Олександрівна Уржумцева; born 10 April 1982), known professionally under her maiden name Nadia Meiher (Надія Мейхер) and formerly as Nadezhda Granovskaya (Russian: Надежда Грановская), is a Ukrainian singer, songwriter, actress, poet, television host, and fashion designer.

Beginning in 2000, she rose to prominence as a member of the Ukrainian pop girl group Nu Virgos—known as VIA Gra in both Ukraine and the Commonwealth of Independent States—on an intermittent basis, including during what is considered to be the group's golden period in 2003 and 2004. She left and re-joined Nu Virgos three times, but ultimately focused on her solo career from 2006 onward; it was around this time when she became a television host on STB. In 2014, she participated in One to One!, the Russian version of the Spanish reality television show Your Face Sounds Familiar. Later, she released the single "Delo ne v tele" (Дело не в теле) for her solo debut.

== Early life and education ==
Meiher was born in Zbruchivka, Volochysk Raion, in what was then the Ukrainian SSR of the Soviet Union, to father Oleksandr Pavlovych Meiher and mother Halyna Anatoliyivna Shchyrba. She is Jewish and German through her paternal line and Ukrainian through her maternal line. When she was in school, her mother left to work in Italy, leaving her with her father. Her family then moved to Khmelnytskyi, where she studied music and dance.

Meiher then moved to Kyiv to study English at the Borys Grinchenko Kyiv University, and also began performing in a local theatre. In 2000, while performing in a theatre in Khmelnytskyi, she was noticed by the Russian singer Valery Meladze, who introduced her to producers Konstantin Meladze and Dmytro Kostyuk, who invited her to move to Kyiv and join the Ukrainian girl group Nu Virgos.

== Career ==
=== Nu Virgos: 2000–2002, 2002–2006, 2009–2011 ===
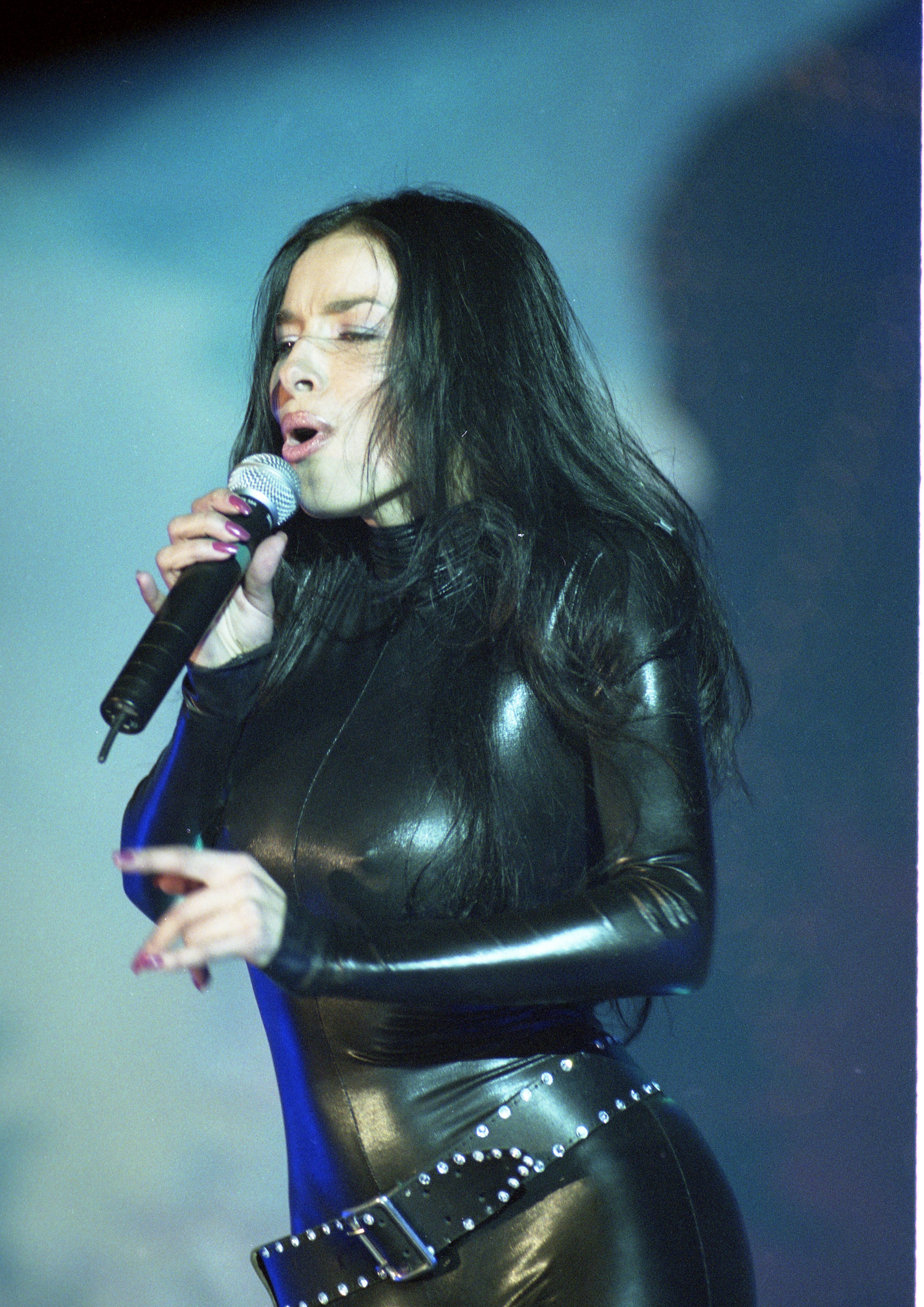
Meiher performing with Nu Virgos, 2001

Nadia Meiher was a member of the original line-up of Nu Virgos, along with Alena Vinnitskaya. Their debut single "Popytka No. 5" was released in 2000 and became a huge hit, where it was eventually named as one of the 99 biggest hits of Russian pop music in the period 1991–2011. The group's first studio album, also titled Popytka No. 5, sold over 700,000 units and earned Golden certification. In April 2002, Meikher temporarily left the group due to her pregnancy.

In September 2002, Meiher rejoined Nu Virgos, which now consisted of Meiher, Vinnitskaya, along with Anna Sedokova and Tatiana Naynik. Vinnitskaya and Naynik left the group shortly after, and were replaced by Vera Brezhneva. The period between January 2003 and September 2004, during which Nu Virgos consisted of Granovskaya, Sedokova and Brezhneva, has been considered "golden era" of the group. In January 2006, Meiher left Nu Virgos once again, in order to focus on her solo projects. She rejoined the group for the third time in 2009, replacing Meseda Bagaudinova, but left it once again in November 2011, due to pregnancy.

=== Solo career: 2006–present ===
From 2006 to 2008, Meiher hosted the STB television show Neymovirni istoriyi kokhannya (Incredible Love Stories) She co-hosted the 1+1 New Year 2007 programme, along with Svetlana Loboda and Ruslana Pysanka. In 2011, Meiher hosted the STB show Neymovirna pravda pro zirok (The Incredible Truth about the Stars). She also participated in the 1+1 show Zirka + Zirka in 2006, and in Odin v odin!; the Russian version of Your Face Sounds Familiar, in 2014. Meiher was also a part of the jury on the reality show Khochu do VIA Hry (I want to join Nu Virgos) in 2013, in which was created to find new members of Nu Virgos, as well as on the talent show Spivay yak zirka (Sing like a star) in 2015.

Meiher released her debut solo single, "Delo ne v tele", in May 2014. Her second single, "Tango vozvrasheniya", was released via iTunes in October the same year. She has since released two more singles, "Ostansya" (2015) and "Historia de un amor" (2016).

Meiher's first collection of poems "Siyuminutnoe vlechenie" (Momentary Attraction) was published in 2009. In 2016, Meiher opened the boutique Meiher by Meiher at the Gulliver centre in Kyiv, which sells her own designs.

== Personal life ==
Meiher has three children; son Ihor (born 15 August 2002) with her then-partner Oleksandr Lishenko, who was then the Deputy of the Kyiv City Council; and daughters Anna (born 23 March 2012) and Mariya (born 17 October 2015) with Russian businessman Mikhail Urzhumtsev, whom she married in 2014.

== Discography ==
=== Singles ===
- 2014 — "Delo ne v tele"
- 2014 — "Tango vozvrascheniya"
- 2015 — "Ostansya"
- 2016 — "Historia de un amor"

== Filmography ==
Title	Year	Role	Notes
Vechera na khutore bliz Dikanki	2002	Oksana's friend	Television film
Zolushka	2003	Japanese princess	Television film
Sorochinskaya yarmarka	2004	Paraska	Television film
Kak kazaki	2010	Herself	Television film
Ty menya lyubish?	2014	Ilona	Film

== Published works ==
- Momentary Attraction (Russian: Сиюминутное влечение, Siyuminutnoe vlechenie) (2009)

== Awards and nominations ==
Award	Year	Nominated work	Result
MAXIM Russia 100 Sexiest Women in the World	2009	—N/a	17
MAXIM Russia 100 Sexiest Women in the World	2010	—N/a	38
MAXIM Russia 100 Sexiest Women in the World	2011	—N/a	32
MAXIM Russia 100 Sexiest Women in the World	2012	—N/a	68
MAXIM Russia 100 Sexiest Women in the World	2013	—N/a	71
MAXIM Russia 100 Sexiest Women in the World	2014	—N/a	46
MAXIM Russia 100 Sexiest Women in the World	2015	—N/a	59

== See also ==
- Nu Virgos
