= Alena Vinnitskaya =

Ukrainian singer

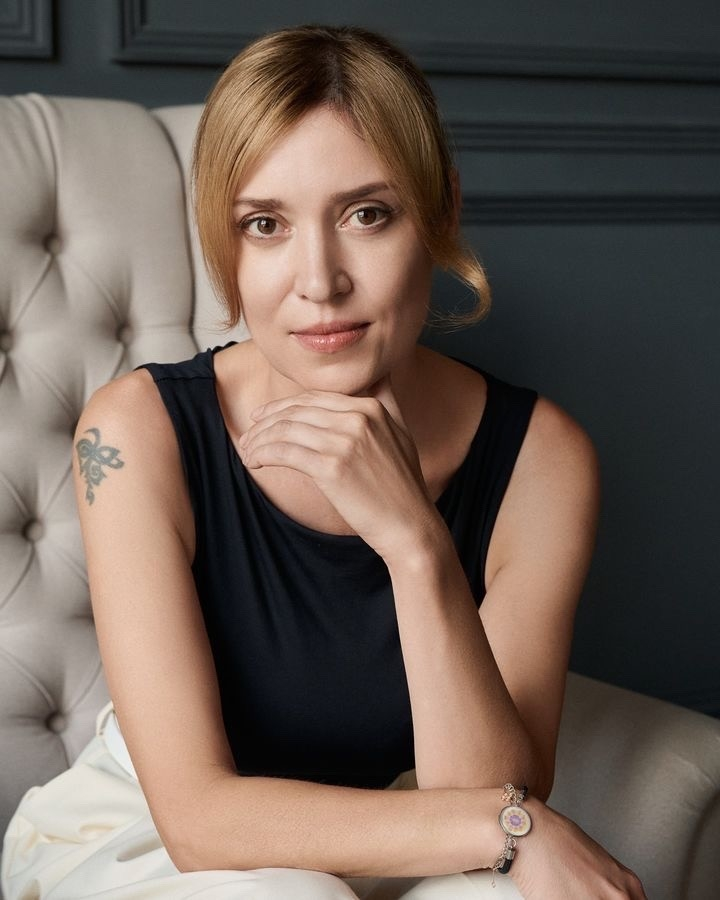
- Vinnitskaya in 2024

Background information
- Born: Olha Viktorivna Vinnytska; 27 December 1974 (age 51); Kyiv, Ukrainian SSR, Soviet Union (now Ukraine)
- Origin: Ukraine
- Genres: alternative rock, pop-rock
- Occupations: Singer, TV presenter, Actress
- Years active: 1992–1996 (The Last Unicorn); 2000–2003 (Nu Virgos); 2003–present (solo)
- Labels: Ukrainian Records, Moon Records
- Formerly of: The Last Unicorn

Olha Viktorivna Vinnytska (Note: In this name that follows East Slavic naming customs, the patronymic is Viktorivna and the family name is Vinnytska.; Ukrainian: Ольга Вікторівна Вінницька) (born 27 December 1974), known professionally as Alena Vinnitskaya, (Note: Russian: Алёна Винницкая; Ukrainian: Альона Вінницька, romanized: Alyona Vinnytska) is a Ukrainian singer, songwriter, composer and TV presenter.

== Career ==
During six years of solo career, Vinnitskaya released 8 CDs: Rassvet (2004), 007 (2005), Sunrise (2005), Kukly (2006), Electro (2007), maxi-single Konvert (2008), ZaMIXovano. The Best mixes (2008), Alena Vinnitskaya. Sbornik hitov 2003-2010 (2010).

She started to write songs in childhood, sending them to the newspaper Pionerskaya Pravda. Some time later Vinnitskaya became a fan of the band Kino and thanks to this started to play the guitar.

In 1993, she created her first group The Last Unicorn, where she appeared as the author of her music and lyrics. The first concerts took place in Kyiv Central Hospital. Unfortunately, the first attempt to become an artist collapsed: not enough information and badly developed Ukrainian business forced the group to stop their activity.

During these few years, Vinnitskaya worked as the insurance agent but was always thinking about the creation of her own band. In 1996 she gave up her work in the insurance company in hope of self-actualization. The long searches of her own way have been started. Vinnitskaya has played in the Theater of the Ecology Institute, in Psychological Theatre etc.

"I together with my brother decided to go and to try ourselves. We have prepared our programs. I was singing the aria of Maria Magdalena from Jesus Christ Superstar. So we've entered. I was taken to the theatre troupe though I wanted to enter the popular troupe. But I do not regret it because I have discovered myself as the actress"

A year later, the troupe broke up because of not very strong management. Vinnitskaya. again was looking for herself and for her own way. At the end of 1997, she discovered a new profession — TV hostess at the music channel Biz TV. Some time later the future singer became a hostess of the other TV program Fan Club at the Inter channel. At the same time, she was starting to work as a DJ at the radio station. In 1998, she entered the school of journalism Internews. These times she was very busy. She was working from 8 am to 9 pm — Internews and 10 pm to 2 am as a radio DJ.

"I don't miss about the stage passed. I have given a lot of my forces but I got much more"

In 2000, Vinnitskaya was invited as the soloist in one popular project that at that time was at the stage of creation — it was Nu Virgos. She worked there for 3 years and then made a decision that she had been thinking about for a long time — to create her own band and to sing her own songs.

"Alena has passed a long way to the scene, starting as the insurance agent, continuing as the TV host, and later becoming the participant of the mega-popular band. But this fame and glory weren't enough for her. Alena has always wanted more — to sing her own songs."

== Cosmopolitan Ukraine ==
Vinnitskaya's debut song Davay zabudem vsyo reached the top of popularity in Ukrainian and Russian hit parades. Her second hit song was Rassvet, and the single Vidish ya zhiva followed it. Some time later, she played with The Cardigans, who came to Ukraine to play their one concert. Nina Person said during a press conference that she liked Alena Vinnitskaya's songs.

In 2004, Vinnitskaya signed an agreement with the representative of world-famous recording company Universal Studios and soon the first album of the singer Rassvet appeared.

A year later the second album 007 represented Vinnitskaya in a traditionally male role — as the secret agent. She has coped with a complex and male character, proposing to the audience her own version of James Bond music. The album also contains new visions of singer's hits in performance of popular DJ's in the country.

The premiere of the new song Kukly, the main song on Vinnitskaya's third album, took place on 13 February 2006. A video version of this work was released a week later.

Vinnitskaya, as usual, is the author of music and lyrics.

"This song -is a story about women, who are ready for everything just to reach their aim of success, wealth and power. Their willingness of this destroys their personality, and they become tough, insincere to themselves and the people around them…" the singer says.

In spring 2006, Vinnitskaya's third album came out.

"This is one of the most free and courageous works of us", she said.

The album of dance music Electro appeared in January 2007. Electro consists of 12 songs. It has remixes of several of Alena's songs, that shows the popularity of her music not only on radio and TV, but also in clubs.

The singer's latest achievement became a maxi-single Konvert. It had been shown to the public in spring 2008. That autumn on TV channels and radio stations appeared the hit Osen zolotaya. This song was written by Oleksiy Bolshoy (former leader band of Cool Before, now her sound producer) had already been known to listeners for 10 years. The song presents new lyrics and arrangements. Osen zolotaya is a duet with Vinnitskaya-Bolshoy.

The new edition of Alena Vinnitskaya songs ZaMIXovano. The Best mixes was released in December, 2008. CD content is created for the different musical tastes of listeners. Everyone can choose something personal – mixes for dance culture fans, and bonus for live pop-rock music admirers.

February 2009, the new video Ya zdes, ya ryadom has appeared on TV channels. This video is a soundtrack to the Ukrainian action movie Accidental record. Later, in spring, Vinnitskaya has presented her new video Vsyo eto s nami (Vesna). This song is from the maxi-single Konvert.

== Discography ==
With Nu Virgos

- Popytka No. 5 (2001)

Studio albums

- Rassvet (2004)
- Sunrise (2005)
- Kukly (2006)

Compilation albums

- 007 (2005)
- Electro (2007)
- ZaMIXovano. The Best Remixes (2008)
- Alena Vinnitskaya. Sbornik hitov 2003-2010 (2010)
