= Nu Virgos =

Ukrainian girl group

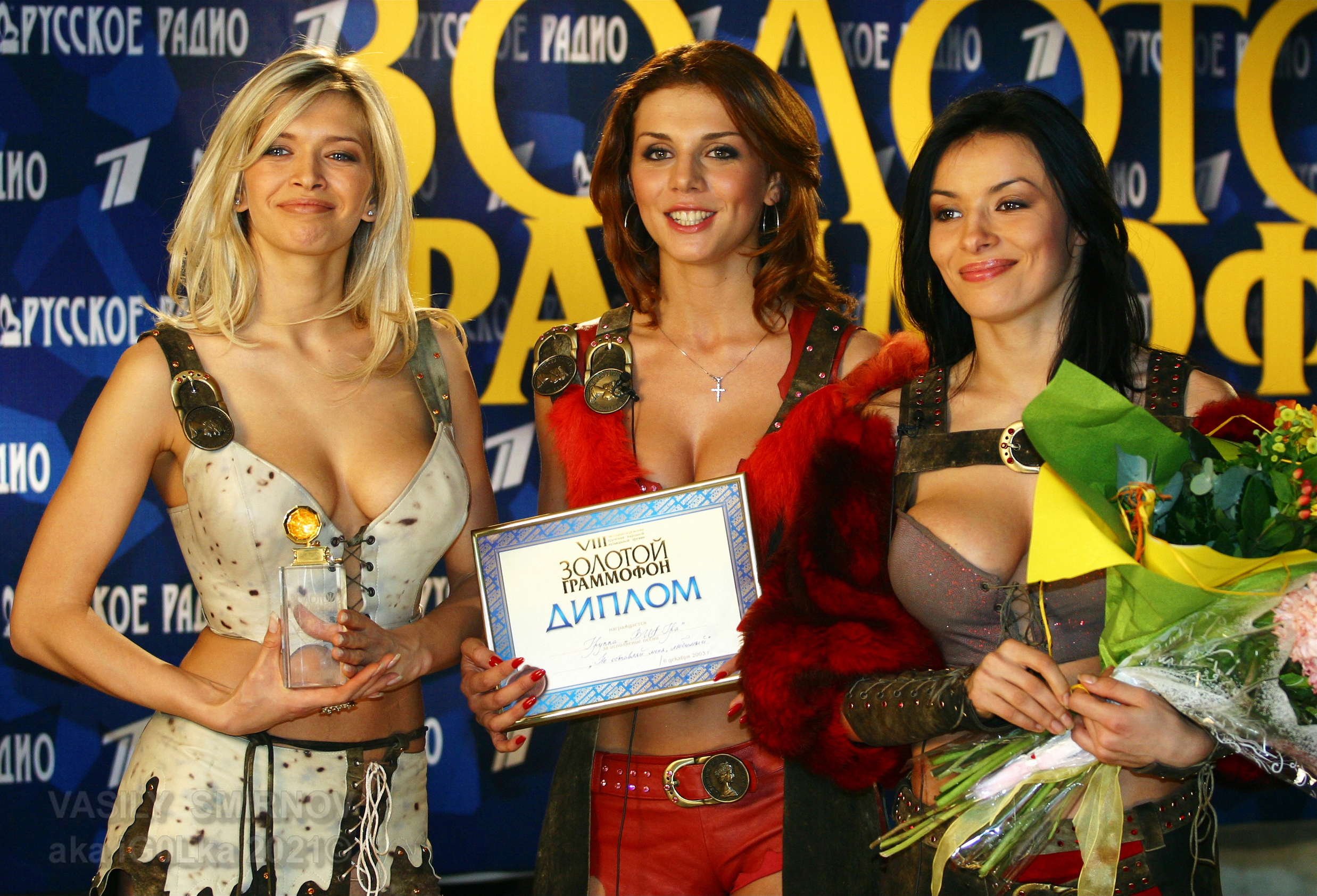
- Nu Virgos at the 2003 Golden Gramophone Awards; from left: Vera Brezhneva, Anna Sedokova and Nadia Meiher

Background information
- Also known as: VIA Gra
- Origin: Kyiv, Ukraine
- Genres: Dance-pop; Europop
- Years active: 2000–2022; 2025
- Labels: Sony Music Russia (2001—2005); Velvet Music (2012—2017); Meladze Music (2017—2022)
- Past members: See timeline: Alena Vinnitskaya (2000—2003); Nadezhda Granovskaya (2000—2002) (2002—2006) (2009—2011); Tatiana Naynik (2002); Anna Sedokova (2002—2004); Vera Brezhneva (2003—2007); Svitlana Loboda (2004); Albina Dzhanabaeva (2004—2013); Khrystyna Kots-Hotlib (2006); Olha Koryahina (2006—2007); Meseda Bagaudinova (2007—2009); Tatiana Kotova (2008—2010); Yeva Bushmina (2010—2012); Santa Dimopulos (2011—2012); Erika Herceg (2013—2020); Misha Romanova (2013—2018); Anastasia Kozhevnikova (2013—2018); Olga Meganskaya (2018—2020); Ulyana Sinetskaya (2018–2025); Sofia Tarasova (2020–2025); Ksenia Popova (2020–2022); Dmytro Kostyuk's group: Dasha Medova (2013—2014); Dasha Rostova (2013—2015); Aina Vilberh (2013—2014); Elena Tolstonogova (2014—2015); Irina Ostrovskaya (2014—2015)

VIA Gra (Ukrainian: ВІА Гра; Russian: ВИА Гра), known outside of Ukraine and other nearby countries as Nu Virgos, were a Ukrainian girl group. The name VIA Gra is a triple wordplay: it is an allusion to the drug Viagra, the first three letters "ВІА" ("VIA") also stand for "vocal-instrumental ensemble" in Ukrainian, and "Гра" ("hra") means "game" or "play" in Ukrainian. The name also references the surnames of the two first members of the group, VI-nnytsk-A and GR-anovsk-A, the originally used stage name of Nadia Meiher. Nu Virgos rose to prominence when they hit the charts in the countries of CIS in September 2000, with their debut single "Popytka No. 5" ("Attempt No. 5").

Their first success outside the Russian language area was in May 2004, with the single "Stop! Stop! Stop!", an English version of their 2002 Russian song. The group is known for their frequent lineup changes, with 13 different individuals having at one time been in the group. The group was co-created by Dmytro Kostyuk and Konstantin Meladze. Kostyuk was the group's manager, while Meladze wrote the songs; the two were credited as co-producers on the group's albums until 2011, when Kostyuk exited the project. In 2025, Meladze announced the final end of the group.

== History ==
=== 2000–2002: Early years ===
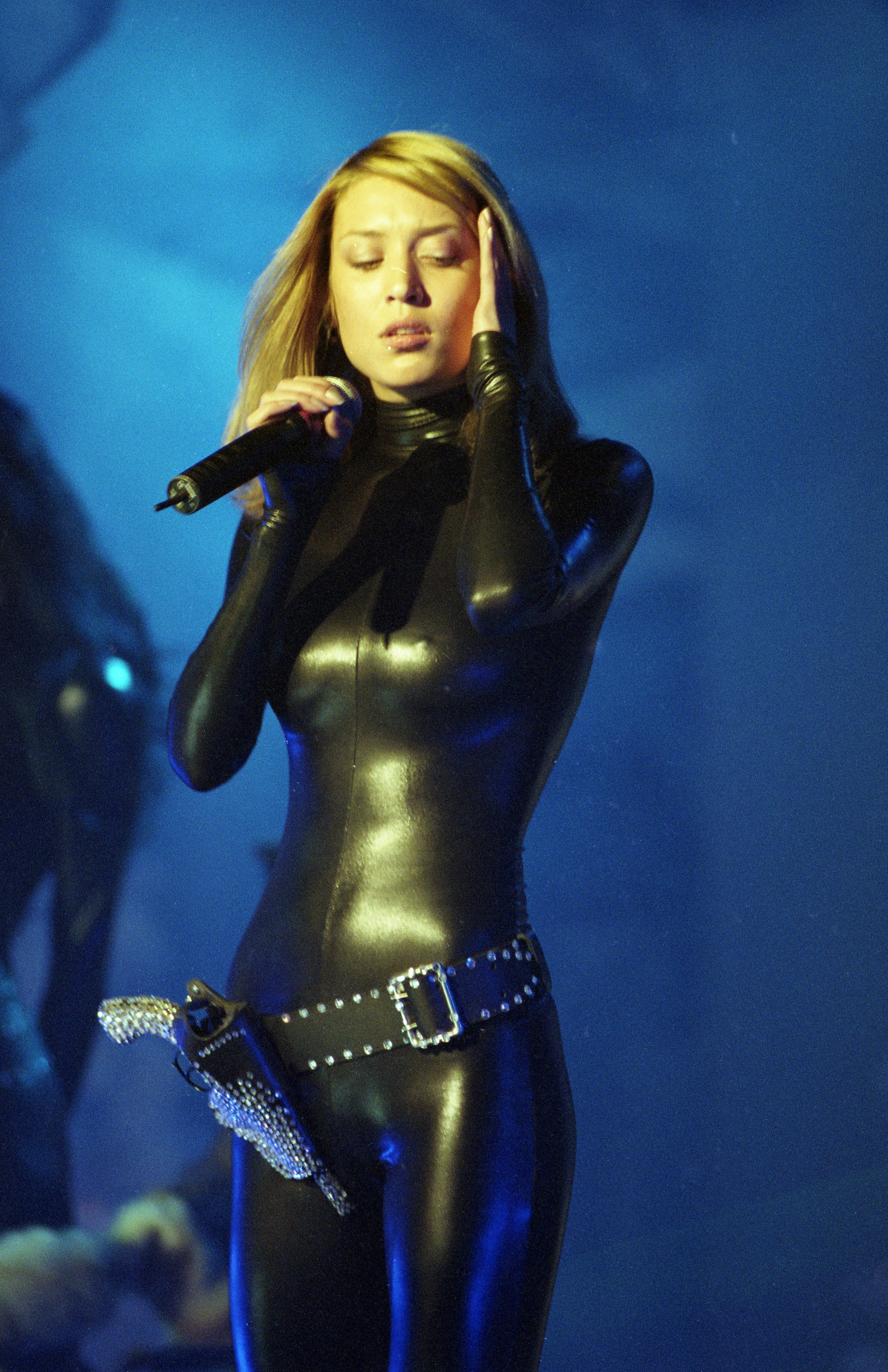
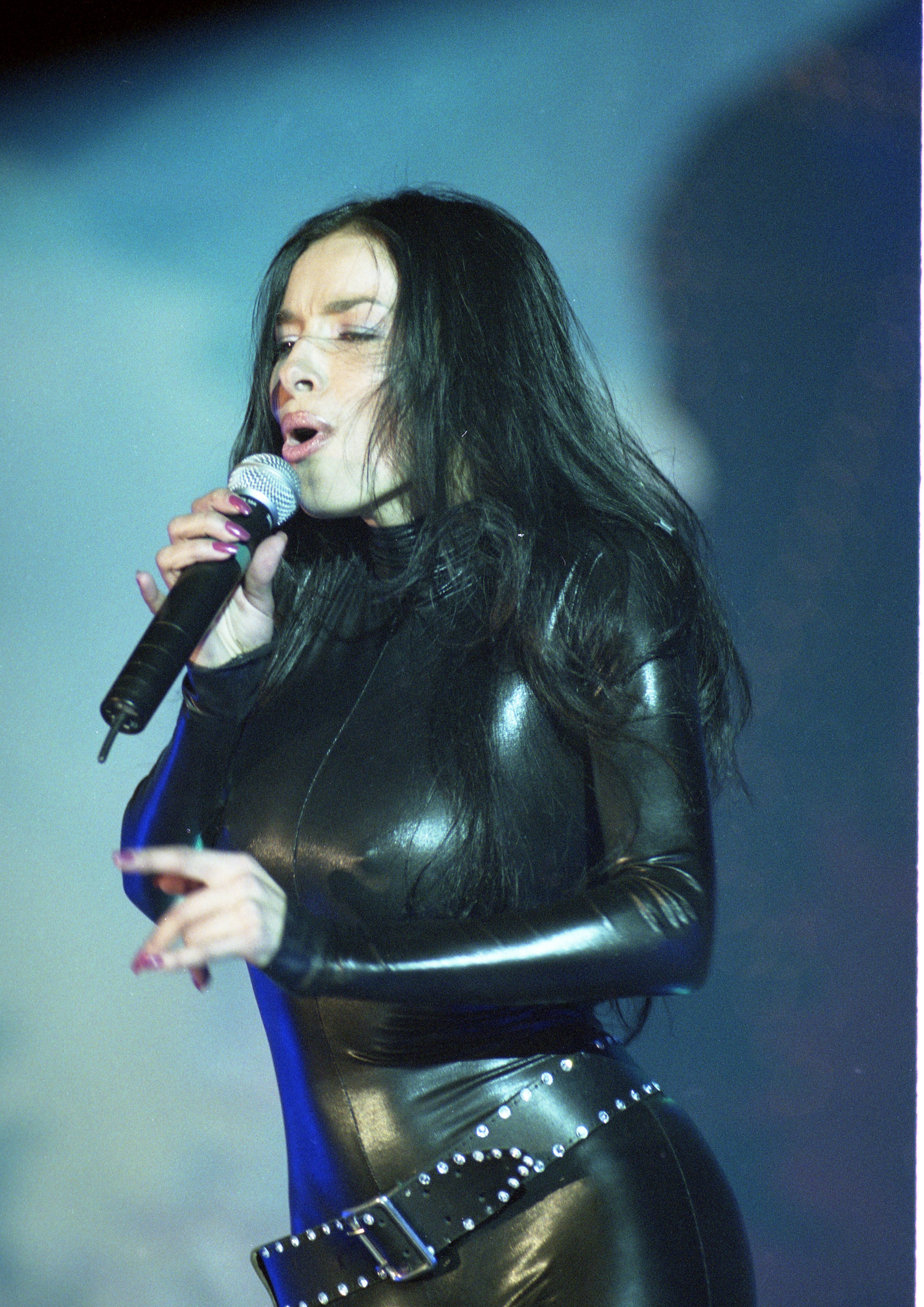
The original line-up of VIA Gra, with Alena Vinnitskaya (left) and Nadia Meiher (right), performing at a Christmas show in December 2001

Dmytro Kostyuk, general producer for the Ukrainian music television channel BIZ-TV at the time, met the songwriter Konstantin Meladze in 1999. They developed a concept for a girl group, which Kostyuk named VIA Gra; the name was later changed to Nu Virgos for international markets by Sony Music due to trademark concerns over the drug Viagra. Its first lineup consisted of Alena Vinnitskaya and Nadia Meiher, the former of whom worked at BIZ-TV. The group debuted in 2000 with the single "Popytka No. 5" (Attempt No. 5), followed by "Obnimi menya" ("Hold Me Closer"), "Bomba" (Bomb), and "Ya ne vernus" ("I Won't Be Back"). By the end of the year, Nu Virgos' repertoire consisted of seven songs, which was enough to embark on a tour. The group's first live performance took place in Dnipropetrovsk, on the stage of the city's Meteor Palace of Sports in front of 4,000 spectators. The group's management then decided to release the first full-length album, Popytka No. 5 in 2001. That year, Nu Virgos received some of their first awards: A Hundred Pood Hit from HIT FM Radio, Golden Gramophone from Russian Radio, and the Golden Firebird prize at the Ukrainian annual festival Tavriyski Igry.

In 2002, Granovskaya became pregnant and left temporarily to give birth, during which time Tatiana Naynik took her place. Upon Granovskaya's leave, the producers decided to expand the group by adding another member. Therefore, the group became a trio instead of a duo, with the addition of Anna Sedokova, along with a change in their musical direction. As a trio, Nu Virgos became characterised by a hair colour scheme of "brunette, blonde, and redhead". In the spring of 2002, the group released their new single "Stop! Stop! Stop!", with the success of the song enabling Nu Virgos to take part in the "Ovation" Music Award Ceremony held at the Moscow's State Central Concert Hall "Rossiya". They released the music video for the song the following summer. In September, the song "Good morning, papa!" and its accompanying music video was released, upon which time Granovskaya had returned, and for the first and only time, four girls were present in the group. The band performed as a four-person band for three months. However, Naynik left Nu Virgos after the producers came to the conclusion that two brunettes did not belong in the same group. To close that year's end, the group's members played the roles of foreign princesses in a TV musical called "Zolushka" (Cinderella). In January 2003, Vinnitskaya left Nu Virgos to pursue a solo career.

=== 2003–2005: "Golden" era ===
By early 2003, Vera Brezhneva had been cast as the new member of the group, and thus began the "golden" era of Nu Virgos. The group was made up of what was considered the "golden" group of soloists: Nadia Meiher, Vera Brezhneva, and Anna Sedokova. In the beginning of 2003, Nu Virgos released "Ne ostavlyay menya, lyubimiy" (“Don't Leave Me, Beloved”), complete with an eponymously titled video tape containing a collection of Nu Virgos' songs. They released Stop! Snyato! (Stop! That's a wrap!), which included five new songs along with seven remixes. They attended the Russian MUZ TV Awards, in which they won the “Soundtrack” award. In May, the group released the music video for the song "Ubey moyu podrugu" ("Kill My Girlfriend"). By the end of 2003, having completed their new album Biologiya (Biology), they entered the international music scene. Their first English-language album Stop! Stop! Stop! saw popularity in Israel, Japan, Taiwan, Thailand, Indonesia and Scandinavian countries. The songs "Okean i tri reki" ("Ocean and Three Rivers") and "Prityazhenya bolshe net" ("No Attraction Anymore"), both in collaboration with singer Valery Meladze, were also released. This was shortly followed by "Biologiya", with the last two music videos releasing in 2004. In the summer of 2004, Nu Virgos were awarded with the Russian music award "MUZ TV 2004" and completed a world tour spanning territories including South East Asia, Israel and America. In November, the group released two more songs: "Mir, o kotorom ya ne znala do tebya" and its English version "Take You Back".

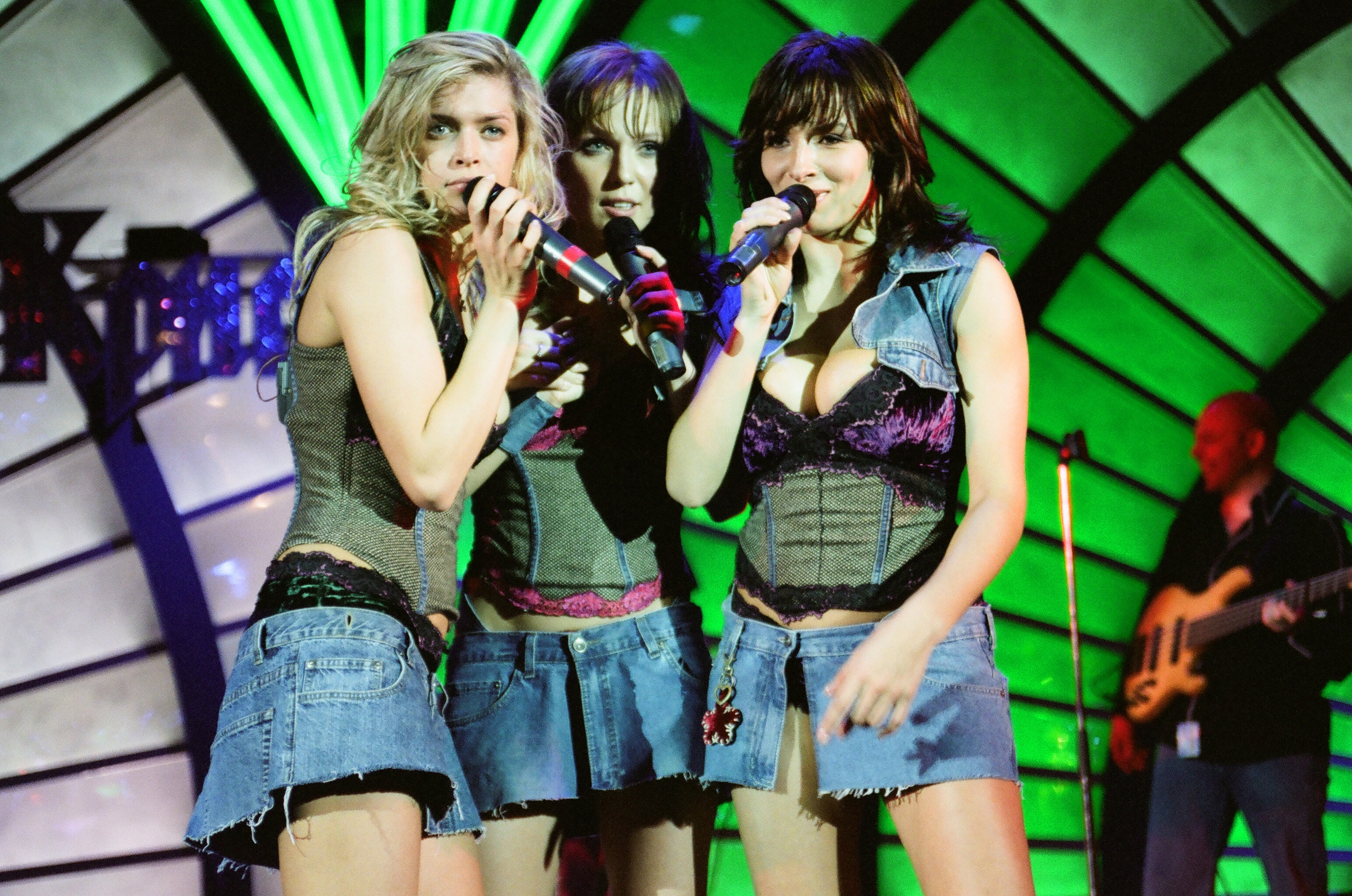
The "diamond lineup" of Nu Virgos (from left to right: Vera Brezhneva, Albina Dzhanabayeva, and Nadia Meiher), in 2005

In 2004, Sedokova became pregnant, and left the group. She was replaced shortly after, only for a few months, by Svetlana Loboda, who had starred in the video for "Biologiya" alongside Meiher and Brezhneva. Loboda's short and turbulent career in Nu Virgos led her to part ways with the group, as fans were appalled by her behaviour during live performances and disappointed that she was replacing Sedokova. After Loboda, Albina Dzhanabaeva appeared as the new member of the group. The year 2005 marked the release of the Russian version of Nu Virgos' official website, as well as the release of three new music videos: "Net nichego khuzhe", "I Don't Want A Man" (English version of "Net nichego khuzhe") and "Brillianty" ("Diamonds"). The last song, considered one of the group's signature songs, gave its name to the "diamond lineup" made up of Brezhneva, Dzhanabaeva, and Meiher. Additionally, the group picked up the MUZ TV's "Best Pop Act" award for the second year in a row.

=== 2006–2012: Final years ===
In January 2006, Nu Virgos were a participant at MIDEM 2006. At that time, Granovskaya decided to leave the band in order to start a solo career. At first, she was replaced by Khrystyna Kots-Hotlib, but after staying in the band for only three months, the singer left, according to Kostyuk, because of her quarrelsome nature. In April 2006, she was replaced by Olga Koryahina. Despite the heavy touring that year, the group released four more music videos; "Obmani no ostansya" ("Lie, but Stay"), with Kots-Hotlib, "L.M.L." (Russian and English), and "Tsvetok i nozh" ("Flower and Knife"), both with Koryahina, while also completing a new English album, their second after Stop! Stop! Stop!. A second English-language album L.M.L. was scheduled for release in November 2006. In early April 2007, Koryahina left the group due to a pregnancy, and so the label decided to release the English album project digitally. Koryahina was replaced by Meseda Bagaudinova. In July 2007, Brezhneva left the group after she married Mykhailo Kiperman, and then went on to host the Russian version of Power of 10 a year later. In May 2007, Nu Virgos won "Best Group" at the MUZ TV Awards for the second time. On 5 September, Nu Virgos released the music video for the song "Potselui" ("Kisses") in Ukraine, and on 10 September in Russia. It was the first single since 2001 that the band released as a duet, since at that time it consisted only of Janabayeva and Bagaudinova. On 1 November 2007, the group released a new compilation album called Potselui (Kisses) featuring 19 tracks. In November, Nu Virgos appeared on the cover of the Russian edition of the men's magazine Maxim. In December 2007, the group recorded a new song called "Ya ne boyus'" ("I'm Not Afraid").

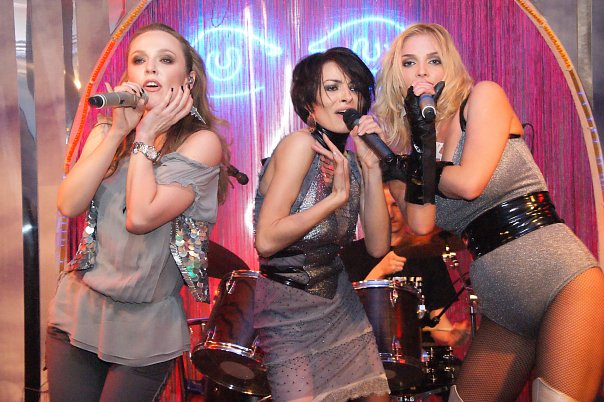
Nu Virgos (from left to right: Albina Dzhanabayeva, Nadezhda Granovskaya, and Tatiana Kotova) in February 2010

In 2008, the group was scheduled to tour for the album L.M.L. in variety of countries such as Japan, Germany, and the United Kingdom. The group released a new video in February 2008. In March, Miss Russia 2006, Tatiana Kotova, joined Nu Virgos. In June 2008, Nu Virgos won the award for Best Group and Best Video for "Potselui" for the fourth time at the MUZ TV Awards. In August, their new single "My Emancipation" was released with an accompanying music video. In November, they finished filming a music video for song "Amerikanskaya zhena" ("American Wife"), which was a part of the official soundtrack for the Russian film Stilyagi. In the beginning of 2009, Nadezhda Granovskaya decided to return to the band, and the producers decided to replace Bagaudinova with her, despite the fact that she did not want to leave. The group released a new single, along with a music video entitled "Anti-Geisha". In the autumn of 2009, the group released a new single; "Sumasshedshiy" ("Crazy"). The music video was released in September.

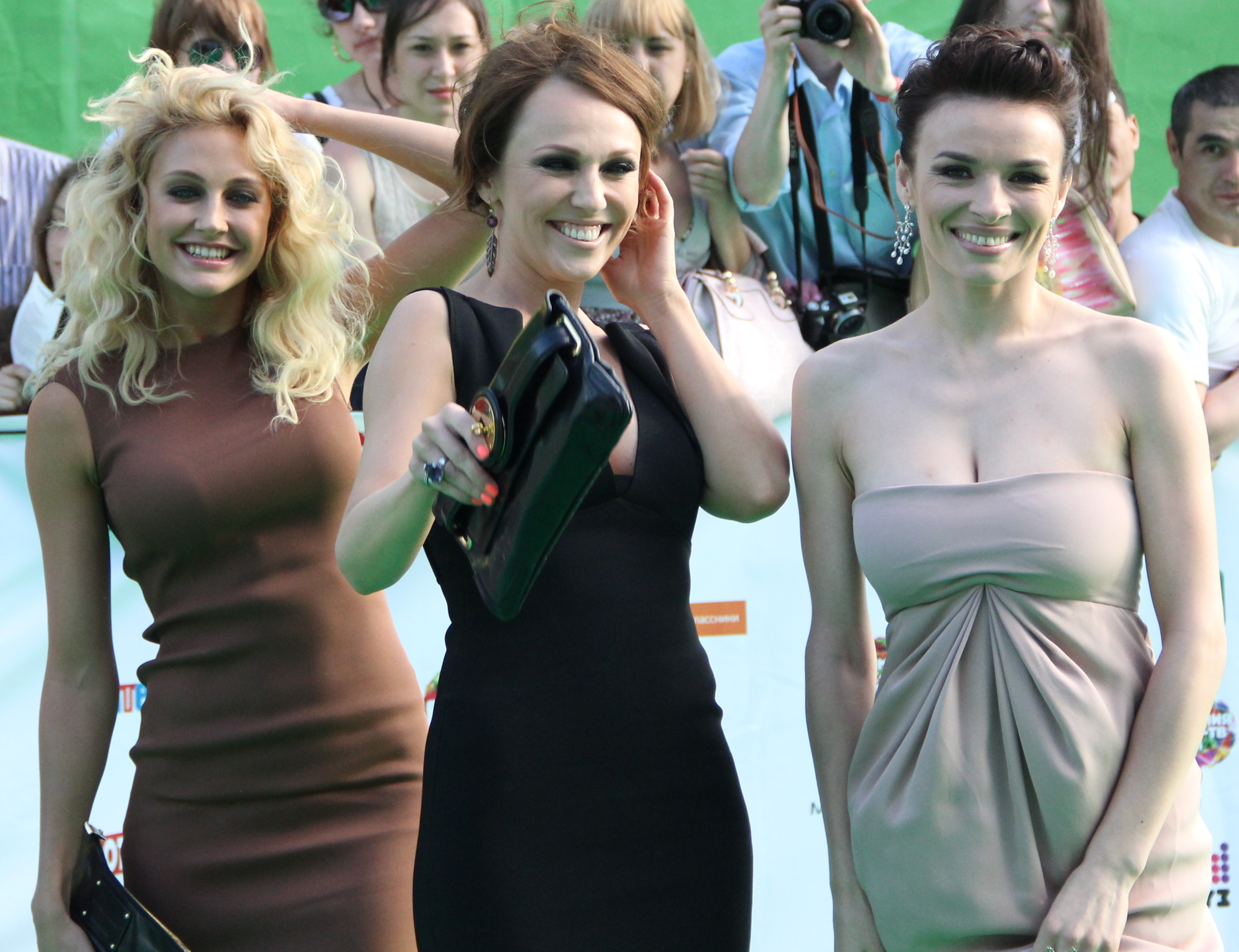
Nu Virgos (from left to right: Yeva Bushmina, Albina Dzhanabaeva and Nadezhda Granovskaya) at the 2011 Muz-TV Music Awards

In March 2010, Kotova left the group and was replaced by Yeva Bushmina. In April, a new song and music video were released; "Poshel von" ("Get Out"). In September, "Den' bez tebya" ("A Day Without You") was also released. In March 2011, Kostyuk resigned as the group's general producer following a conflict with Meladze. In November 2011, Meiher (Granovskaya), pregnant once again, left the group and was replaced by Santa Dimopulos. In February 2012, the music video for "Allo, mam!" ("Hello, Mom!") was released. In September 2012, Santa Dimopulos decided to leave the group, after recording just one single. A month later, it was announced that the group has been placed on hiatus, with no confirmation regarding when they would return and with which members. In December 2012, Konstantin Meladze announced during a press conference that Nu Virgos would cease to exist by January 2013, citing that the group had outlived itself in the format that it was performing in at the given time.

=== 2013–2018: Rebirth ===
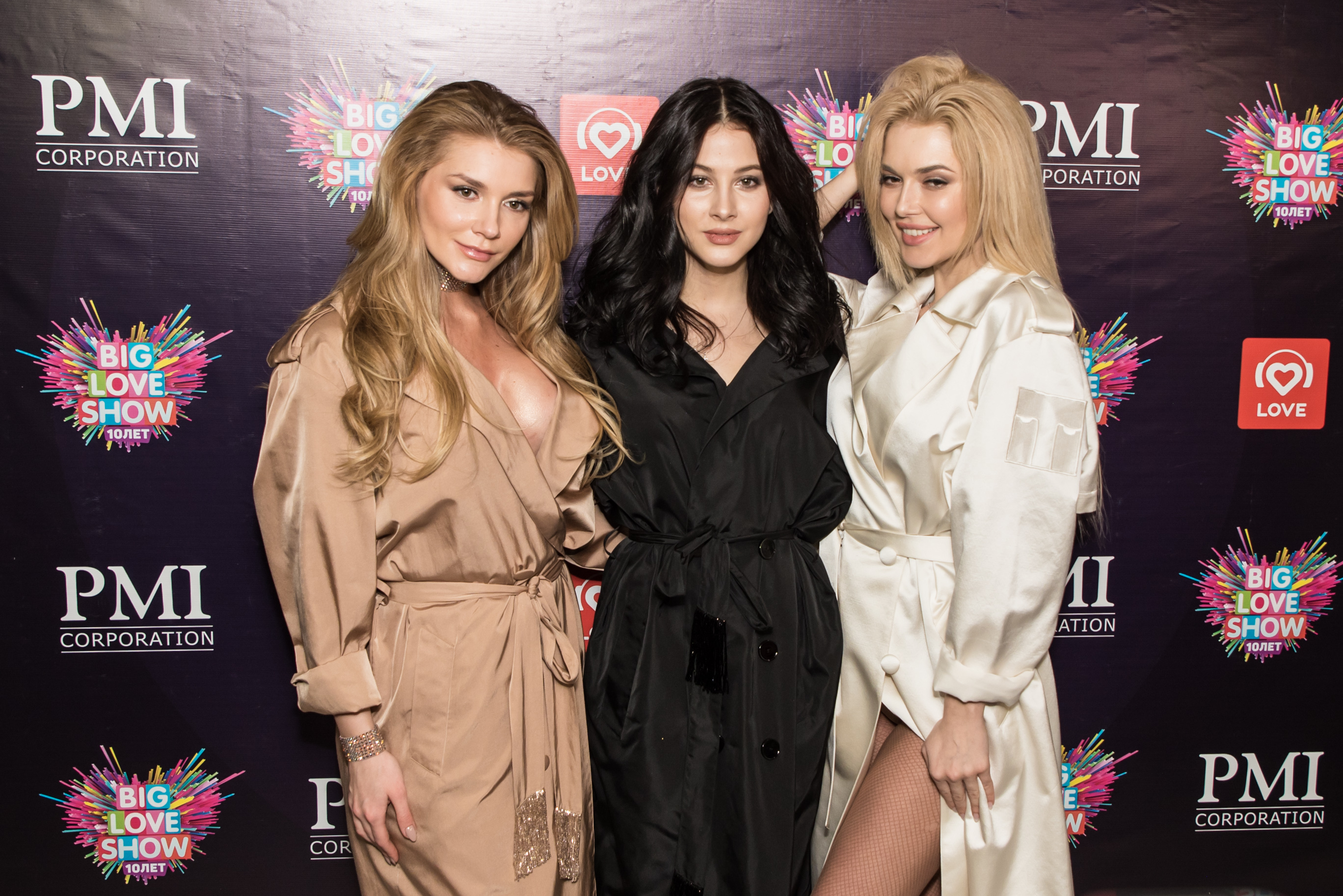
The lineup of Nu Virgos assembled as a result of the reality show (from left to right: Erika Herceg, Anastasia Kozhevnikova and Misha Romanova) at the 2018 Big Love Show

Despite initial claims that Nu Virgos would no longer exist as a group, Meladze announced a casting for his new show at the beginning of 2013; Хочу V ВИА Гру (Khochu V Vya Hru; I want to be in VIA Gra). The casting was formatted as a reality TV show, consisting of eight episodes, in which by the end, three new soloists were chosen by popular vote: Erika Herceg, Anastasia Kozhevnikova and Misha Romanova. In November 2013, they released their new single and music video entitled "Peremiriye" ("Truce"). Meanwhile, during Meladze's casting show, Kostyuk, the ex-general producer of Nu Virgos, announced his own new lineup. In autumn of 2013, he presented his version of Nu Virgos, which consisted of Darya Rostova, Dasha Medova and Aina Vilberh. At a show in Kyiv, they performed singles from their new album Magiya (Magic). This caused further tensions between Meladze and Kostuyk, who were already at odds with each other since the dissolution of the old Nu Virgos. In May 2014, the new Nu Virgos released their second single "U menya poyavilsya drugoy" ("I've Got Another Man"), featuring Georgian rapper Vakhtang. In 2014, the group was criticized in Ukraine for having accepted awards in Russia, while many Ukrainians believed their country was a victim of Russian aggression. In November 2014, Nu Virgos were featured on a new single released by Russian rapper Mot, titled "Kislorod" ("Oxygen").

In March 2015, Nu Virgos released their new solo single, "Eto bylo prekrasno" ("It's Been Great"). The song was well received, but critics panned the single, citing that the song sounded relatively similar to many of the group's previous works, including "Obmani, no ostan'sya" ("Lie, but Stay") and "Ya ne boyus'" (I'm Not Afraid"). In July 2015, they released a new compilation album called Vsё luchsheye v odnom (All The Best In One), which featured the most popular Nu Virgos songs throughout the group's history. In November, the group released a new single "Tak sil'no" ("So Much"). They performed this song, along with a medley of previous Nu Virgos' songs; "LML", "U menya poyavilsya drugoy" ("I've Got Another Man"), "Peremiriye" ("Truce") and "Sumasshedshiy" ("Crazy"), at the Big Love Show on 15 February 2016. In November 2016, the group released a new single entitled "Kto ty mne?" ("Who Are You to Me?"). As all other songs released by the group, the music and lyrics were written by the group's producer, Meladze. On October 18, 2017, the single "Moyo serdtse zanyato" ("My Heart is Busy") was released on Love Radio. The official music video for the single was released on 19 November.

On 24 March 2018, at a concert in Tbilisi, the group performed in a new lineup: Anastasia Kozhevnikova, Erika Herceg, and Olga Meganskaya. Meganskaya, a singer from St. Petersburg, replaced Misha Romanova, whose maternity leave became known two days before the concert.

On 24 August 2018, Kozhevnikova got married. During the wedding, she announced that her contract with the group would be ending on 2 September. She stated that she had chosen not to renew the contract due to wanting to pursue a solo career. However, even after the end of the contract, and before the announcement of a new member, the group continued to perform in the old lineup.

=== 2018–2025: New lineups, singles and break-up ===
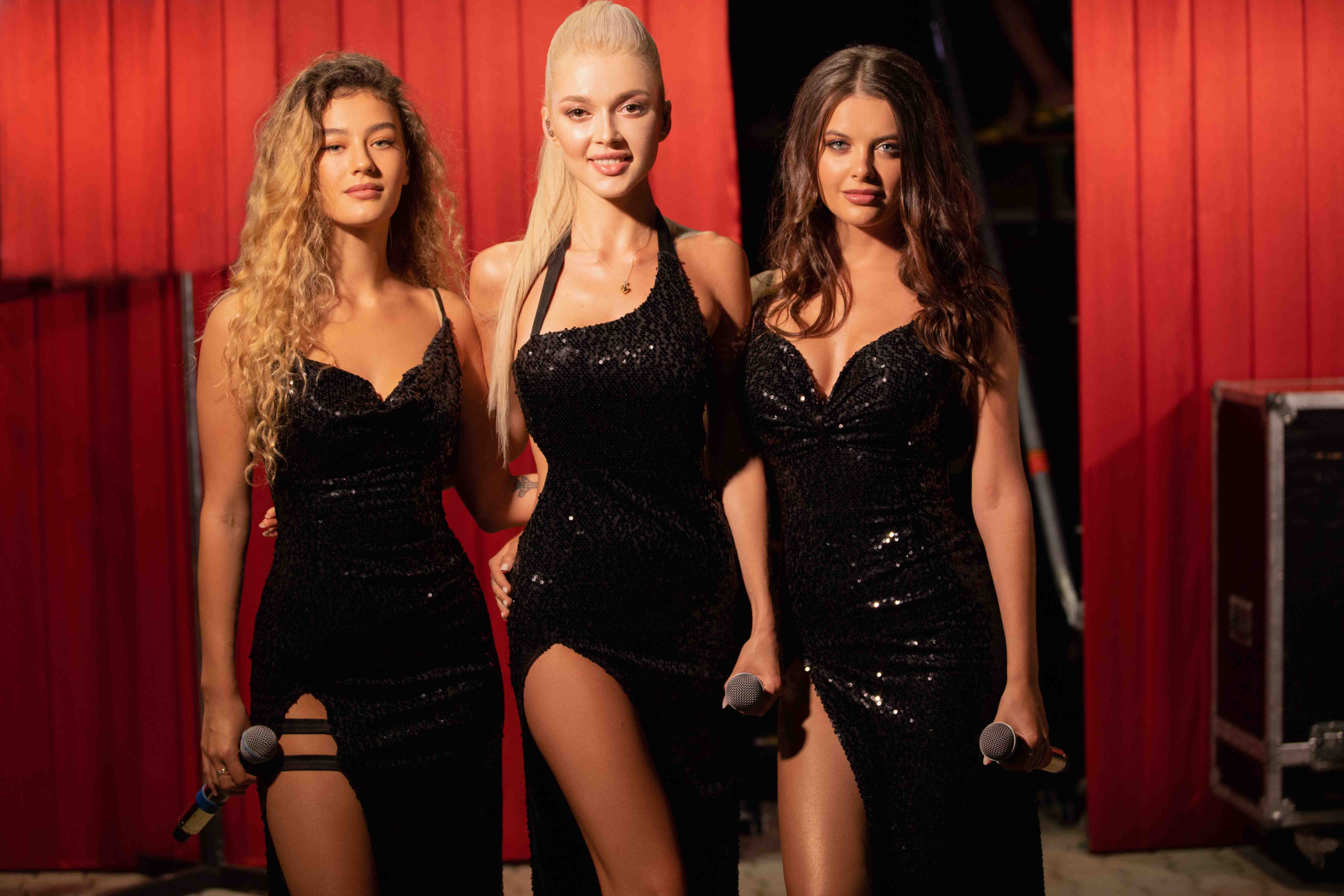
Nu Virgos (from left to right: Ulyana Sinetskaya, Erika Herceg, and Olga Meganskaya) at the 2019 Laima Rendezvous Jūrmala

On 15 September, the group performed at the Agalarov Estate Club in a renewed lineup with Ulyana Sinetskaya. On 5 October, they released a new single; "Ya polyubila monstra" ("I Loved A Monster"), and on 12 November, the music video for the song was released.

On 5 September 2019, the song entitled "Lyubol" ("Love/pain") premiered on the Meladze Music YouTube channel and on 9 October, they released the music video for the song. On 6 December, the group released the song "1+1" along with a music video.

On 14 May 2020, Herceg announced on her Instagram account that she was leaving the group in December and starting a solo career. In September, she left the band. On 16 October, Meganskaya announced that she was also leaving the group.

On 22 October, a new single "Rikoshet" ("Ricochet") premiered on Love Radio. On 6 November, an updated lineup was revealed on the Evening Urgant show. Sinetskaya was joined by the new members of the group; Ksenia Popova and Sofia Tarasova.

On 27 November, the music video for the song "Rikoshet" was released, but it received bad reviews from viewers.

On 28 January 2021, the re-release of "Anti-Geisha" was released. On 16 April, the group released a new song; "Rodnikovaya Voda" ("Spring Water"). On 15 October, they released the song "Maneken" ("Mannequin"), to which the music video was released on 8 December.

Due to the 2022 Russian invasion of Ukraine, the group disbanded. On May 23, 2025, Konstantin Meladze announced the final closure of the group, releasing the last song "Galileo", in the recording of which Ulyana Sinetskaya and Sofia Tarasova took part.

== Members ==
Timeline	Vocalists			
September 2000—April 2002	Alena Vinnitskaya	—N/a	Nadezhda Granovskaya	—N/a
April 2002—September 2002	Alena Vinnitskaya	Anna Sedokova	Tatiana Naynik	—N/a
September 2002—November 2002	Alena Vinnitskaya	Anna Sedokova	Nadezhda Granovskaya	Tatiana Naynik
November 2002—January 2003	Alena Vinnitskaya	Anna Sedokova	Nadezhda Granovskaya	—N/a
January 2003—May 2004	Vera Brezhneva	Anna Sedokova	Nadezhda Granovskaya	—N/a
May 2004—September 2004	Vera Brezhneva	Svetlana Loboda	Nadezhda Granovskaya	—N/a
September 2004—January 2006	Vera Brezhneva	Albina Dzhanabaeva	Nadezhda Granovskaya	—N/a
January 2006—April 2006	Vera Brezhneva	Albina Dzhanabaeva	Khrystyna Kots-Hotlib	—N/a
April 2006—April 2007	Vera Brezhneva	Albina Dzhanabaeva	Olga Romanovskaya	—N/a
April 2007—July 2007	Vera Brezhneva	Albina Dzhanabaeva	Meseda Bagaudinova	—N/a
July 2007—March 2008	—N/a	Albina Dzhanabaeva	Meseda Bagaudinova	—N/a
March 2008—January 2009	Tatiana Kotova	Albina Dzhanabaeva	Meseda Bagaudinova	—N/a
January 2009—March 2010	Tatiana Kotova	Albina Dzhanabaeva	Nadezhda Granovskaya	—N/a
March 2010—November 2011	Yeva Bushmina	Albina Dzhanabaeva	Nadezhda Granovskaya	—N/a
December 2011—September 2012	Yeva Bushmina	Albina Dzhanabaeva	Santa Dimopulos	—N/a
October 2012—December 2012	Yeva Bushmina	Albina Dzhanabaeva	—N/a	—N/a
November 2013—March 2018	Erika Herceg	Anastasia Kozhevnikova	Misha Romanova	—N/a
March 2018—September 2018	Erika Herceg	Anastasia Kozhevnikova	Olga Meganskaya	—N/a
September 2018—October 2020	Erika Herceg	Ulyana Sinetskaya	Olga Meganskaya	—N/a
October 2020—February 2022	Ksenia Popova	Ulyana Sinetskaya	Sofia Tarasova	—N/a
Dmytro Kostyuk's group
July 2013—October 2013	Dasha Medova	—N/a	Dasha Rostova	—N/a
October 2013–March 2014	Dasha Medova	Aina Vilberh	Dasha Rostova	—N/a
May 2014—March 2015	Irina Ostrovskaya	Elena Tolstonogova	Dasha Rostova	—N/a

== Discography ==
- Popytka No. 5 (2001)
- Stop! Snyato! (2003)
- Biologiya (2003)
- Stop! Stop! Stop! (2004)
- L.M.L. (2007)
