= Albina Dzhanabaeva =

Russian singer (born 1979)

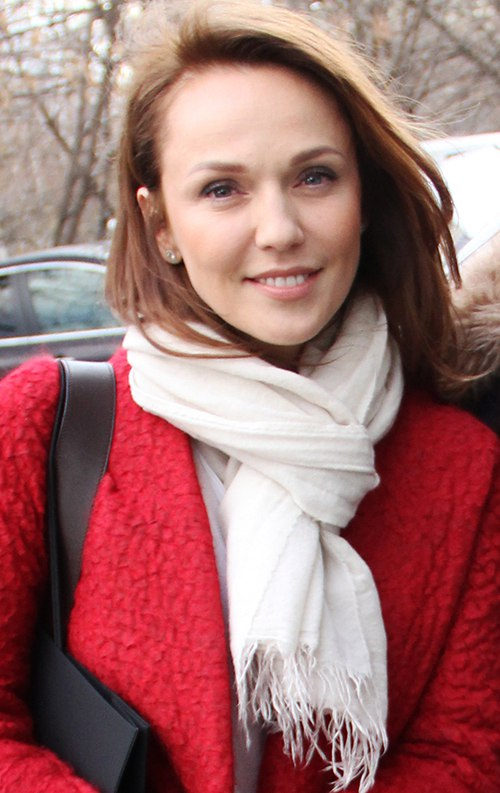

Background information
- Born: Albina Borisovna Dzhanabaeva; 9 April 1979 (age 47); Volgograd, Russian SFSR, Soviet Union (now Russia)
- Origin: Russia
- Genres: Pop
- Occupations: Singer, Actress
- Years active: 2004-2012 VIA Gra; 2013–present (solo)
- Website: www.dzhanabaeva.ru

Albina Borisovna Dzhanabaeva (Russian: Альбина Борисовна Джанабаева; born April 9, 1979) is a Russian singer, actress, TV-Host. She is best known for being a member of the Ukrainian girl group VIA Gra from 2004 to 2013.

== Biography ==
Born 9 April 1979 in Volgograd.

She completed music school majoring in piano and also in the department of musical theatre at the Gnesynikh Institute.

Then, in 1999 she traveled to Korea to take part in Snow White and the Seven Dwarves where she sang the part of the foreign Snow White in Korean.

In 2002, she returned to Russia to join singer Valeriy Meladze as a backing vocalist, where she stayed for two years.

In the autumn of 2004, she joined Ukrainian girl group VIA Gra following Valeriy's recommendation.

In 2012 she starred in the film Betrayal. The film was selected to compete for the Golden Lion at the 69th Venice International Film Festival.

VIA Gra had split 1 January 2013 and started her solo career and has gained success in both Russia and Ukraine.

== Personal life ==
She currently lives in Moscow with her 2 sons, Konstantin and Luka

== Singles ==
- 2013: Kapli (Drops)
- 2013: Nadoyeli (Fed up)

== Filmography ==
- 2012: Betrayal
