= Konstantin Meladze =

Georgian-born Ukrainian and Russian composer and producer (born 1963)

Konstantin Meladze: Константин Меладзе (Russian); კონსტანტინე მელაძე (Georgian)
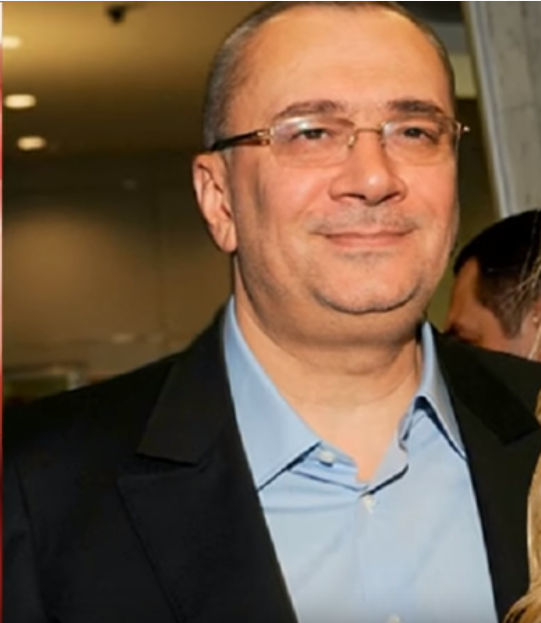

Background information
- Born: 11 May 1963 (age 63); Batumi, Georgian SSR, Soviet Union
- Genres: Pop; art rock; Eurodance; Europop; pop rock
- Occupations: Songwriter; record producer
- Label: Velvet Music

Konstantin Shotayevich Meladze (Russian: Константин Шотаевич Меладзе; Georgian: კონსტანტინე მელაძე; born 11 May 1963) is a Georgian-born Ukrainian and Russian composer and producer. He is the older brother of singer Valery Meladze and co-founder and co-producer of the Ukrainian girl group Nu Virgos (ВИА Гра).

== Biography ==
=== Early life ===
Meladze was born on 11 May 1963 in Batumi to Shota and Nelly Meladze, who were engineers. He has a brother, Valery (1965) and a sister, Liana (1968).

=== Career ===
He has composed and produced songs for artists such as Valery Meladze, Nu Virgos, Yin-Yang, Vera Brezhneva, Albina Dzhanabaeva, Sofia Rotaru ("Ya zhe yego lyubila" and "Odin na svete") and Polina Gagarina. He has also composed songs for a number of films, including Lilya 4-ever and a Russian 2003 version of Cinderella (Russian: Золушка) and Hipsters.

In 2016 and 2017 he was a judge at Vidbir, Ukraine's National Selection for the Eurovision Song Contest.

== Music video appearances ==
| Title | Year | Artist |
|---|---|---|
| "Okean i tri reki (Океан и три реки)" | 2003 | (Nu Virgos with Valeriy Meladze) |

== Personal life ==
Konstantin was married to Jana Meladze in 1994; they have three children: Alice (2000), Liya (2004) and Valery (2005).

He married Ukrainian singer Vera Brezhneva in 2015. The couple divorced in 2023. The alleged reason for the split was their disagreement over Meladze continuing to own real estate in Russia and work in the Russian music industry following the Russian invasion of Ukraine.

== See also ==
- "No" (Meladze song)

| Preceded by Volodymyr Zelenskyy | Most beautiful by VIVA! 2009; With: Nastya Kamenskikh | Succeeded by Yevgeny Komarovsky |
