= Rasskazikha =

Rasskazikha Рассказиха
- Selo
- Location within Altai Krai Location within Russia
- Coordinates: 53°05′N 83°50′E
- Country: Russia
- Region: Altai Krai
- District: Pervomaysky District
- Time zone: UTC+7:00

Rasskazikha (Russian: Рассказиха) is a rural locality (a selo) and the administrative center of Rasskazikhinsky Selsoviet, Pervomaysky District, Altai Krai, Russia. The population was 516 as of 2013. There are 11 streets.

== Geography ==
Rasskazikha is located on the Ob River, 45 km south of Novoaltaysk (the district's administrative centre) by road. Bobrovka is the nearest rural locality.
