= Beshentsevo =

Beshentsevo Бешенцево
- Selo
- Location within Altai Krai Location within Russia
- Coordinates: 53°31′N 84°11′E
- Country: Russia
- Region: Altai Krai
- District: Pervomaysky District
- Time zone: UTC+7:00

Beshentsevo (Russian: Бешенцево) is a rural locality (a selo) in Logovskoy Selsoviet, Pervomaysky District, Altai Krai, Russia. The population was 167 as of 2013. There are 3 streets.

== Geography ==
Beshentsevo is located 33 km northeast of Novoaltaysk (the district's administrative centre) by road. Logovskoye is the nearest rural locality.
