= Malaya Povalikha =

Malaya Povalikha Малая Повалиха
- Selo
- Location within Altai Krai Location within Russia
- Coordinates: 53°44′N 84°23′E
- Country: Russia
- Region: Altai Krai
- District: Pervomaysky District
- Time zone: UTC+7:00

Malaya Povalikha (Russian: Малая Повалиха) is a rural locality (a selo) in Novoberezovsky Selsoviet, Pervomaysky District, Altai Krai, Russia. The population was 68 as of 2013. There are 2 streets.

== Geography ==
Malaya Povalikha is located 76 km northeast of Novoaltaysk (the district's administrative centre) by road. Novoberyozovka is the nearest rural locality.
