= Losikha =

Losikha Лосиха
- Settlement
- Location within Altai Krai Location within Russia
- Coordinates: 53°19′N 84°07′E
- Country: Russia
- Region: Altai Krai
- District: Pervomaysky District
- Time zone: UTC+7:00

Losikha (Russian: Лосиха) is a rural locality (a settlement) in Bayunovoklyuchevsky Selsoviet, Pervomaysky District, Altai Krai, Russia. The population was 44 as of 2013. There are 2 streets.

== Geography ==
Losikha is located 23 km southeast of Novoaltaysk (the district's administrative centre) by road. Pokrovka is the nearest rural locality.
