= Posyolok Ilyicha =

Posyolok Ilyicha Посёлок Ильича
- Settlement
- Location within Altai Krai Location within Russia
- Coordinates: 53°33′N 84°00′E
- Country: Russia
- Region: Altai Krai
- District: Pervomaysky District
- Time zone: UTC+7:00

Posyolok Ilyicha (Russian: Посёлок Ильича) is a rural locality (a settlement) in Zudilovsky Selsoviet, Pervomaysky District, Altai Krai, Russia. The population was 505 as of 2013. There are 5 streets.

== Geography ==
Posyolok Ilyicha is located 24 km north of Novoaltaysk (the district's administrative centre) by road.
