= Lesnaya Polyana, Altai Krai =

Lesnaya Polyana Лесная Поляна
- Settlement
- Location within Altai Krai Location within Russia
- Coordinates: 53°34′N 83°43′E
- Country: Russia
- Region: Altai Krai
- District: Pervomaysky District
- Time zone: UTC+7:00

Lesnaya Polyana (Russian: Лесная Поляна) is a rural locality (a settlement) in Sibirsky Selsoviet, Pervomaysky District, Altai Krai, Russia. The population was 351 as of 2013. There are five streets.

== Geography ==
Lesnaya Polyana is located 34 km north of Novoaltaysk (the district's administrative centre) by road. Lesopitomnik is the nearest rural locality.
