= Zhilino, Altai Krai =

Zhilino Жилино
- Selo
- Location within Altai Krai Location within Russia
- Coordinates: 53°24′N 84°18′E
- Country: Russia
- Region: Altai Krai
- District: Pervomaysky District
- Time zone: UTC+7:00

Zhilino (Russian: Жилино) is a rural locality (a selo) and the administrative center of Zhilinsky Selsoviet, Pervomaysky District, Altai Krai, Russia. The population was 937 as of 2013. There are 14 streets.

== Geography ==
Zhilino is located 33 km east of Novoaltaysk (the district's administrative centre) by road. Malakhovo is the nearest rural locality.
