= Akulovo =

Akulovo Акулово
- Selo
- Location within Altai Krai Location within Russia
- Coordinates: 53°55′N 84°01′E
- Country: Russia
- Region: Altai Krai
- District: Pervomaysky District
- Time zone: UTC+7:00

Akulovo (Russian: Акулово) is a rural locality (a selo) and the administrative center of Akulovsky Selsoviet, Pervomaysky District, Altai Krai, Russia. The population was 731 as of 2013. There are six streets.

== Geography ==
Akulovo is located 79 km north of Novoaltaysk (the district's administrative centre) by road. Purysevo is the nearest rural locality.
