= Kazachy, Altai Krai =

Kazachy Казачий
- Settlement
- Location within Altai Krai Location within Russia
- Coordinates: 53°31′N 83°50′E
- Country: Russia
- Region: Altai Krai
- District: Pervomaysky District
- Time zone: UTC+7:00

Kazachy (Russian: Казачий) is a rural locality (a settlement) in Borovikhinsky Selsoviet, Pervomaysky District, Altai Krai, Russia. The population was 919 as of 2013. There are 9 streets.

== Geography ==
Kazachy is located 19 km north of Novoaltaysk (the district's administrative centre) by road. Borovikha is the nearest rural locality.
