= Starokraychikovo =

Starokraychikovo Старокрайчиково
- Selo
- Location within Altai Krai Location within Russia
- Coordinates: 53°54′N 83°54′E
- Country: Russia
- Region: Altai Krai
- District: Pervomaysky District
- Time zone: UTC+7:00

Starokraychikovo (Russian: Старокрайчиково) is a rural locality (a selo) in Akulovsky Selsoviet, Pervomaysky District, Altai Krai, Russia. The population was 168 as of 2013. There are 4 streets.

== Geography ==
Starokraychikovo is located 74 km north of Novoaltaysk (the district's administrative centre) by road. Inyushovo is the nearest rural locality.
