= Porkovka, Pervomaysky District, Altai Krai =

Porkovka Покровка
- Settlement
- Location within Altai Krai Location within Russia
- Coordinates: 53°20′N 84°08′E
- Country: Russia
- Region: Altai Krai
- District: Pervomaysky District
- Time zone: UTC+7:00

Porkovka (Russian: Покровка) is a rural locality (a settlement) in Bayunovoklyuchevsky Selsoviet, Pervomaysky District, Altai Krai, Russia. The population was 198 as of 2013. There are 9 streets.

== Geography ==
Porkovka is located 21 km southeast of Novoaltaysk (the district's administrative centre) by road. Losikha is the nearest rural locality.
