= Novokopylovo, Pervomaysky District, Altai Krai =

Novokopylovo Новокопылово
- Selo
- Location within Altai Krai Location within Russia
- Coordinates: 53°30′N 84°20′E
- Country: Russia
- Region: Altai Krai
- District: Pervomaysky District
- Time zone: UTC+7:00

Novokopylovo (Russian: Новокопылово) is a rural locality (a selo) in Zhilinsky Selsoviet, Pervomaysky District, Altai Krai, Russia. The population was 148 as of 2013. There are 4 streets.

== Geography ==
Novokopylovo is located 46 km east of Novoaltaysk (the district's administrative centre) by road. Novochesnokovka is the nearest rural locality.
