= Sorochy Log =

Sorochy Log Сорочий Лог
- Selo
- Location within Altai Krai Location within Russia
- Coordinates: 53°34′N 84°08′E
- Country: Russia
- Region: Altai Krai
- District: Pervomaysky District
- Time zone: UTC+7:00

Sorochy Log (Russian: Сорочий Лог) is a rural locality (a selo) and the administrative center of Sorochelogovskoy Selsoviet, Pervomaysky District, Altai Krai, Russia. The population was 1,195 as of 2013. There are 11 streets.

== Geography ==
Sorochy Log is located 28 km northwest of Novoaltaysk (the district's administrative centre) by road. Beshentsevo is the nearest rural locality.
