= Povalikha =

Povalikha Повалиха
- Selo
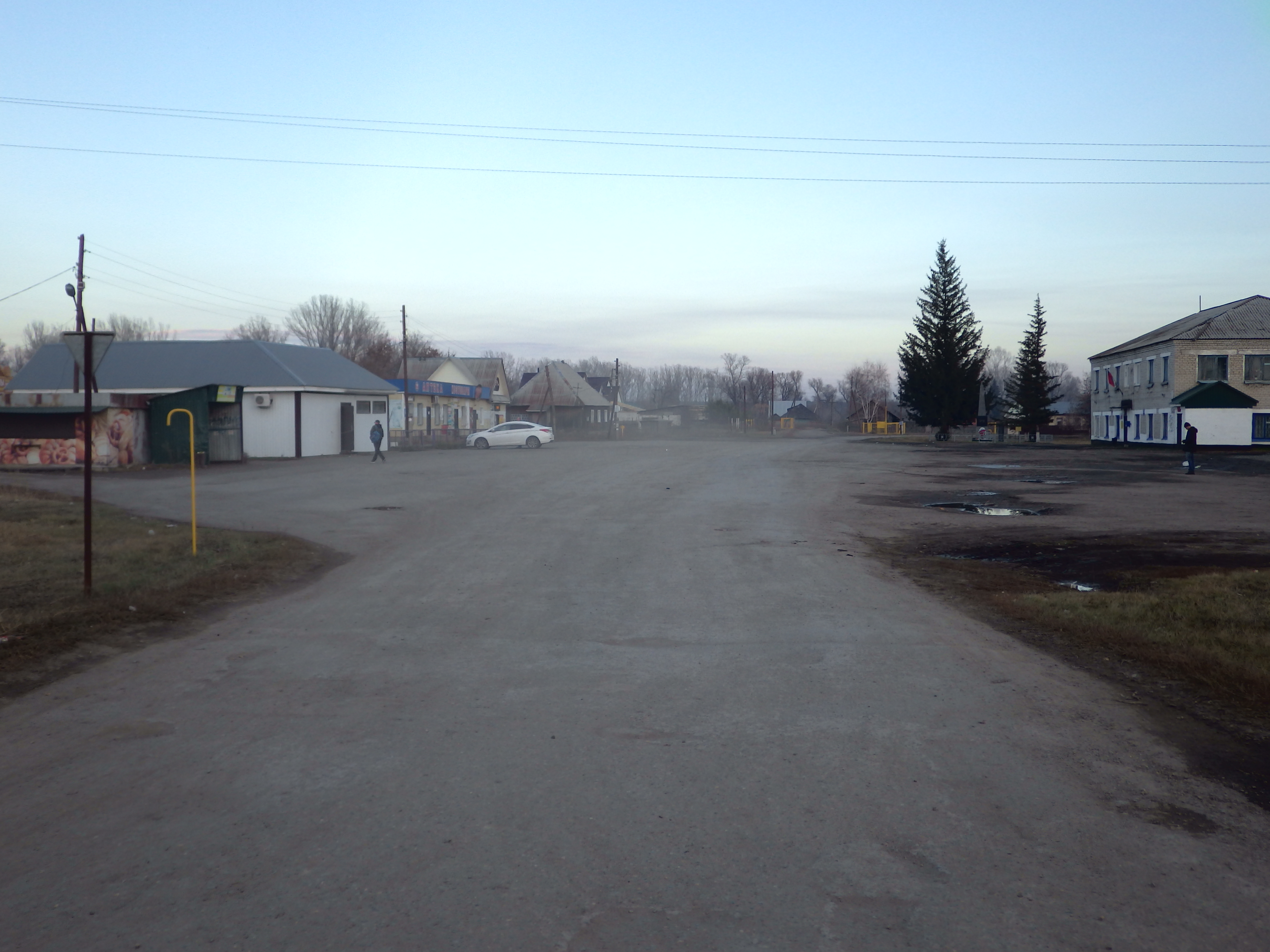
- Povalikha

- Location within Altai Krai Location within Russia
- Coordinates: 53°30′N 83°46′E
- Country: Russia
- Region: Altai Krai
- District: Pervomaysky District
- Time zone: UTC+7:00

Povalikha (Russian: Повалиха) is a rural locality (a selo) and the administrative center of Povalikhinsky Selsoviet, Pervomaysky District, Altai Krai, Russia. The population was 3,089 as of 2013. There are 37 streets.

== Geography ==
Povalikha is located 26 km northwest of Novoaltaysk (the district's administrative centre) by road. Kazachy is the nearest rural locality.
