= Novy Mir, Pervomaysky District, Altai Krai =

Novy Mir Новый Мир
- Settlement
- Location within Altai Krai Location within Russia
- Coordinates: 53°28′N 84°11′E
- Country: Russia
- Region: Altai Krai
- District: Pervomaysky District
- Time zone: UTC+7:00

Novy Mir (Russian: Новый Мир) is a rural locality (a settlement) in Logovskoy Selsoviet, Pervomaysky District, Altai Krai, Russia. The population was 400 as of 2013. There is 1 street.

== Geography ==
Novy Mir is located 40 km northeast of Novoaltaysk (the district's administrative centre) by road. Logovskoye is the nearest rural locality.
