= Pervomayskoye, Pervomaysky District, Altai Krai =

Pervomayskoye Первомайское
- Selo
- Location within Altai Krai Location within Russia
- Coordinates: 53°43′N 84°01′E
- Country: Russia
- Region: Altai Krai
- District: Pervomaysky District
- Time zone: UTC+7:00

Pervomayskoye (Russian: Первомайское) is a rural locality (a selo) and the administrative center of Pervomaysky Selsoviet, Pervomaysky District, Altai Krai, Russia. The population was 4,821 as of 2013. There are 42 streets.

== Geography ==
Pervomayskoye is located 45 km north of Novoaltaysk (the district's administrative centre) by road. Novopovalikha is the nearest rural locality.
