= Purysevo =

Purysevo Пурысево
- Selo
- Location within Altai Krai Location within Russia
- Coordinates: 53°56′N 84°05′E
- Country: Russia
- Region: Altai Krai
- District: Pervomaysky District
- Time zone: UTC+7:00

Purysevo (Russian: Пурысево) is a rural locality (a selo) in Akulovsky Selsoviet, Pervomaysky District, Altai Krai, Russia. The population was 81 as of 2013. There are 3 streets.

== Geography ==
Purysevo is located 85 km north of Novoaltaysk (the district's administrative centre) by road. Akulovo is the nearest rural locality.
