= Golyshevo =

Golyshevo Голышево
- Selo
- Location within Altai Krai Location within Russia
- Coordinates: 53°40′N 83°55′E
- Country: Russia
- Region: Altai Krai
- District: Pervomaysky District
- Time zone: UTC+7:00

Golyshevo (Russian: Голышево) is a rural locality (a selo) in Pervomaysky Selsoviet, Pervomaysky District, Altai Krai, Russia. The population was 220 as of 2013. There are 6 streets.

== Geography ==
Golyshevo is located 50 km north of Novoaltaysk (the district's administrative centre) by road. Pervomayskoye is the nearest rural locality.
