= Logovskoye =

Logovskoye Логовское
- Selo
- Location within Altai Krai Location within Russia
- Coordinates: 53°29′N 84°11′E
- Country: Russia
- Region: Altai Krai
- District: Pervomaysky District
- Time zone: UTC+7:00

Logovskoye (Russian: Логовское) is a rural locality (a selo) and the administrative center of Logovskoy Selsoviet, Pervomaysky District, Altai Krai, Russia. The population was 1,417 as of 2013. There are 16 streets.

== Geography ==
Logovskoye is located 37 km northeast of Novoaltaysk (the district's administrative centre) by road. Beshentsevo is the nearest rural locality.
