= Talovka, Pervomaysky District, Altai Krai =

Talovka Таловка
- Selo
- Location within Altai Krai Location within Russia
- Coordinates: 53°45′N 84°07′E
- Country: Russia
- Region: Altai Krai
- District: Pervomaysky District
- Time zone: UTC+7:00

Talovka (Russian: Таловка) is a rural locality (a selo) in Zhuravlikhinsky Selsoviet, Pervomaysky District, Altai Krai, Russia. The population was 100 as of 2013. There are 5 streets.

== Geography ==
Talovka is located 55 km northeast of Novoaltaysk (the district's administrative centre) by road. Novopovalikha is the nearest rural locality.
