= Kislukha =

Kislukha Кислуха
- Settlement
- Location within Altai Krai Location within Russia
- Coordinates: 53°30′N 83°42′E
- Country: Russia
- Region: Altai Krai
- District: Pervomaysky District
- Time zone: UTC+7:00

Allotment cottages by Kislukha River in Pervomaysky District, Altai Krai.

Kislukha (Russian: Кислуха) is a rural locality (a settlement) in Povalikhinsky Selsoviet, Pervomaysky District, Altai Krai, Russia. The population was 263 as of 2013. There are 17 streets.

== Geography ==
Kislukha is located 29 km northwest of Novoaltaysk (the district's administrative centre) by road. Povalikha is the nearest rural locality.
