= Bayunovskiye Klyuchi =

Bayunovskiye Klyuchi Баюновские Ключи
- Selo
- Location within Altai Krai Location within Russia
- Coordinates: 53°20′N 84°12′E
- Country: Russia
- Region: Altai Krai
- District: Pervomaysky District
- Time zone: UTC+7:00

Bayunovskiye Klyuchi (Russian: Баюновские Ключи) is a rural locality (a selo) and the administrative center of Bayunovoklyuchevsky Selsoviet, Pervomaysky District, Altai Krai, Russia. The population was 1,569 as of 2013. There are 24 streets.

== Geography ==
Bayunovskiye Klyuchi is located 25 km southeast of Novoaltaysk (the district's administrative centre) by road. Bayunovo is the nearest rural locality.
