= Novokrayushkino =

Novokrayushkino Новокраюшкино
- Selo
- Location within Altai Krai Location within Russia
- Coordinates: 53°46′N 83°56′E
- Country: Russia
- Region: Altai Krai
- District: Pervomaysky District
- Time zone: UTC+7:00

Novokrayushkino (Russian: Новокраюшкино) is a rural locality (a selo) in Severny Selsoviet, Pervomaysky District, Altai Krai, Russia. The population was 327 as of 2013. There are 7 streets.

== Geography ==
Novokrayushkino is located 61 km north of Novoaltaysk (the district's administrative centre) by road. Severny is the nearest rural locality.
