= Bazhevo =

Bazhevo Бажево
- Settlement
- Location within Altai Krai Location within Russia
- Coordinates: 53°24′N 83°59′E
- Country: Russia
- Region: Altai Krai
- District: Pervomaysky District
- Time zone: UTC+7:00

Bazhevo (Russian: Бажево) is a rural locality (a settlement) in Beryozovsky Selsoviet, Pervomaysky District, Altai Krai, Russia. The population was 973 as of 2013. There are 18 streets.

== Geography ==
Bazhevo is located 6 km east of Novoaltaysk (the district's administrative centre) by road. Beryozovka is the nearest rural locality.
