= Rogulichny =

Rogulichny Рогуличный
- Settlement
- Location within Altai Krai Location within Russia
- Coordinates: 53°39′N 83°45′E
- Country: Russia
- Region: Altai Krai
- District: Pervomaysky District
- Time zone: UTC+7:00

Rogulichny (Russian: Рогуличный) is a rural locality (a settlement) in Sibirsky Selsoviet, Pervomaysky District, Altai Krai, Russia. The population was 414 as of 2013. There are 4 streets.

== Geography ==
Rogulichny is located 36 km north of Novoaltaysk (the district's administrative centre) by road. Ozyorki is the nearest rural locality.
