= Malaya Rechka =

Malaya Rechka Малая Речка
- Settlement
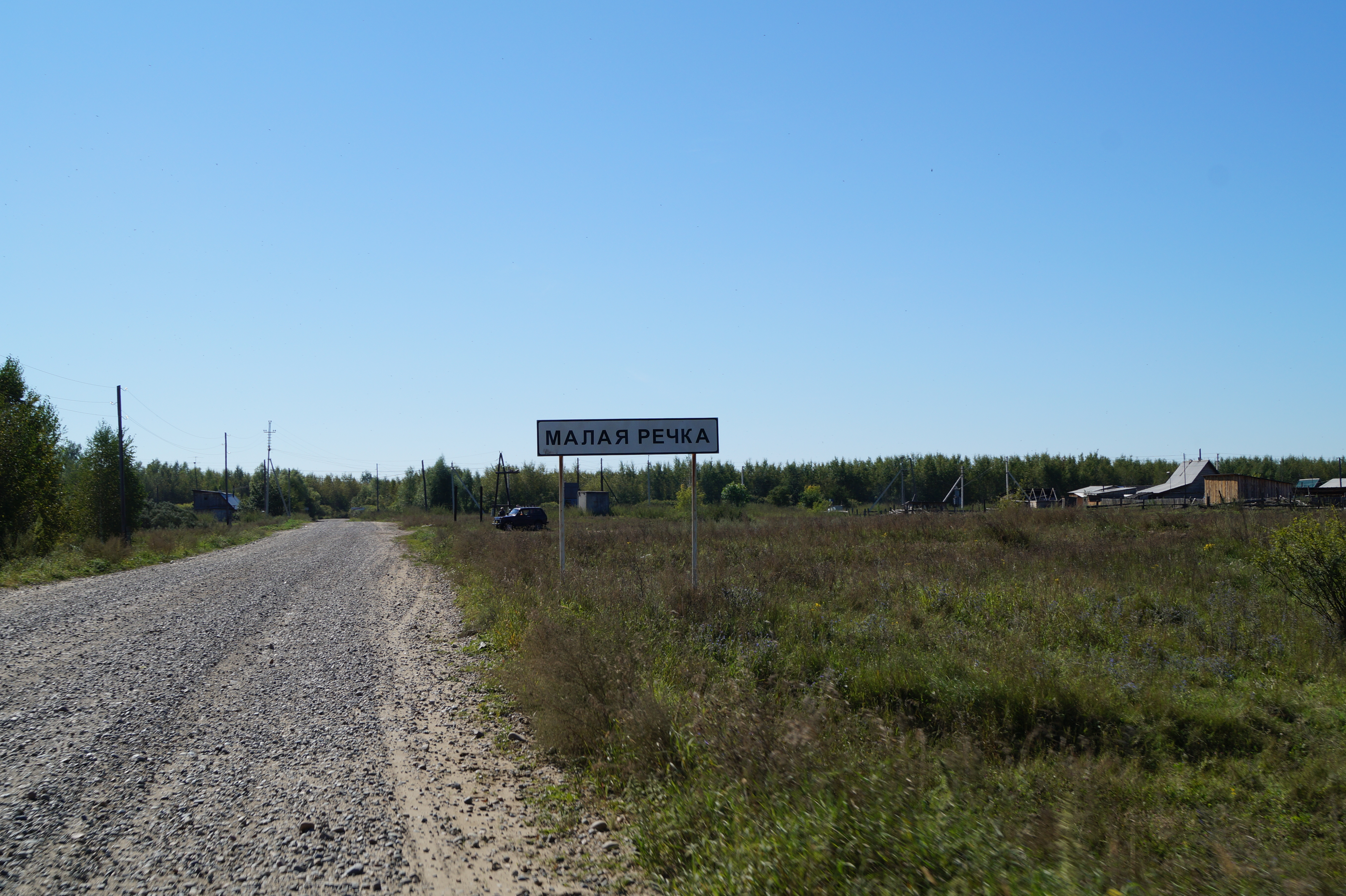
- Malaya Rechka

- Location within Altai Krai Location within Russia
- Coordinates: 52°59′N 83°49′E
- Country: Russia
- Region: Altai Krai
- District: Pervomaysky District
- Time zone: UTC+7:00

Malaya Rechka (Russian: Малая Речка) is a rural locality (a settlement) in Rasskazikhinsky Selsoviet, Pervomaysky District, Altai Krai, Russia. The population was 23 as of 2013. There is 1 street.

== Geography ==
Malaya Rechka is located 57 km south of Novoaltaysk (the district's administrative centre) by road. Nizhnyaya Petrovka is the nearest rural locality.
