= Kamianske River Port =

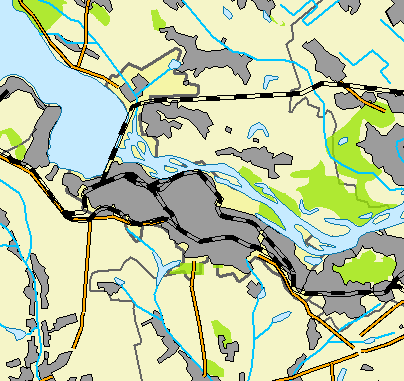
- Interactive map of Kamianske River Port
- Native name: Кам'янський річковий порт

Location
- Country: Ukraine
- Location: 51925, Dnipropetrovsk Oblast, Kamianske, Korchevsky Street, 2

Details
- No. of berths: 3

Statistics
- Website rechport.pat.ua

Kamianske River Port (formerly called Dniprodzerzhynsk) is located on the right bank of the Dnieper River in Kamianske, Dnipropetrovsk Oblast, Ukraine. The port was founded in 1878 as a pier used for passenger service, transportation of agricultural products, granite, sand, and metal. The largest transshipment volumes of the modern port are about 1.5 million tons of cargo per year.

The port is located 475 km from the mouth of the Dnieper.

The duration of navigation is from March 20 to November 28.

There are three cargo berths.

== Interesting fact ==
The port is in a former Soviet closed city Kamianske (Dniprodzerzhinsk) that was home to the largest uranium processing factory in the former Soviet Union.

== See also ==
- Kamianske
- Cargo turnover of Ukrainian ports
