= DniproAzot =

Ukrainian chemical company

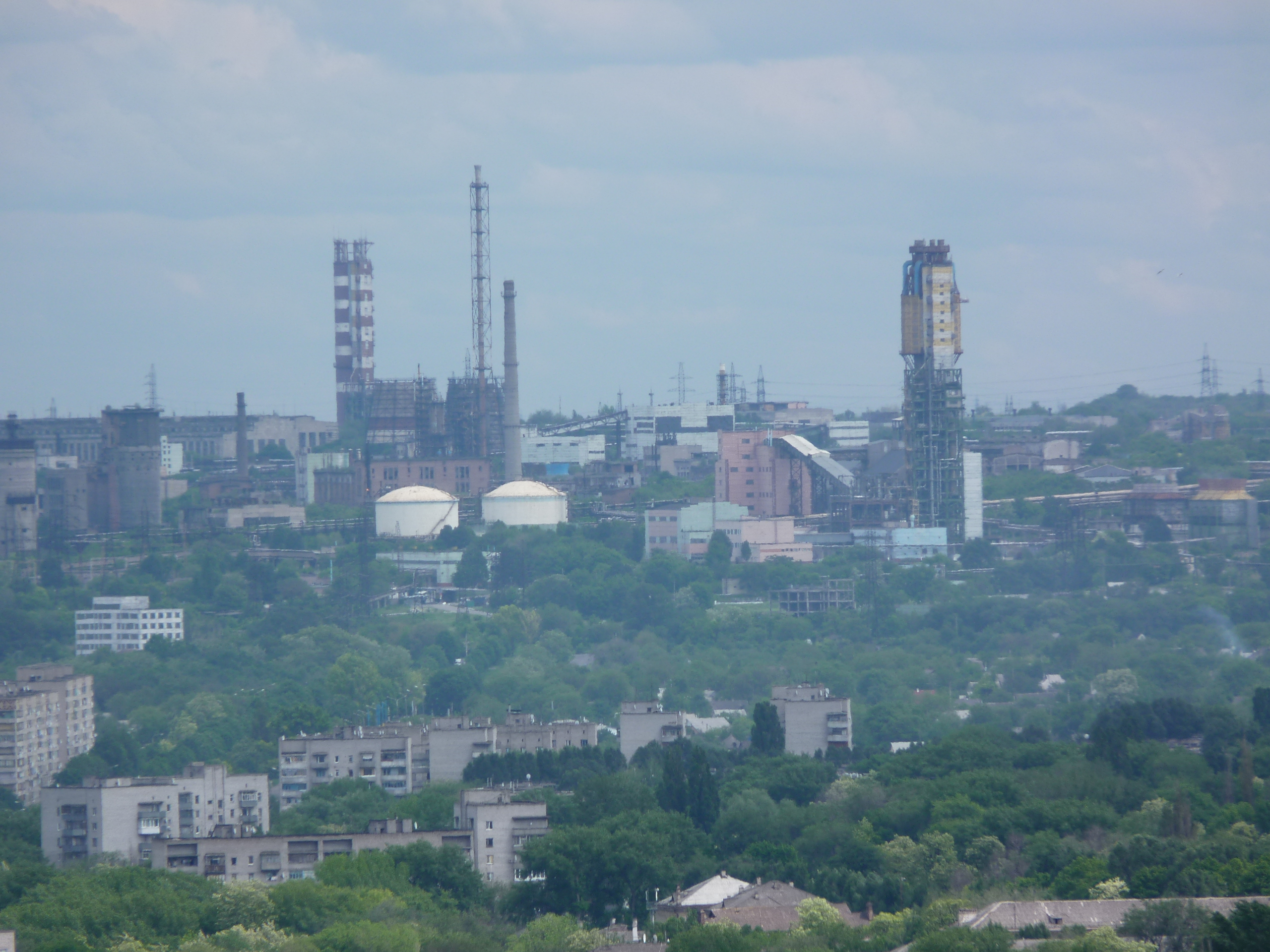
- Native name: ДніпроАзот
- Type: Joint Stock Company
- Industry: Chemical
- Founded: 1938
- Headquarters: Kamianske, Ukraine
- Revenue: 63,978,000 hryvnia (2025)
- Total assets: 1,553,186,000 hryvnia (2025)
- Number of employees: 4000

DniproAzot located in Kamianske, Dnipropetrovsk Oblast is an enterprise in the chemical industry of Ukraine. DniproAzot is a significant producer of ammonia, nitrogen fertilizers, urea, caustic soda, chlorine, and hydrochloric acid. DniproAzot is one of the five largest chemical enterprises in the country. In May 2018, the company celebrated its 80th anniversary.

== See also ==
- Odesa Port Plant (Chemical)
- Azot (Cherkasy)
- Sumykhimprom
- Rivneazot
