= Kamianske =

City in Dnipropetrovsk Oblast, Ukraine

Kamianske Кам'янське
- City
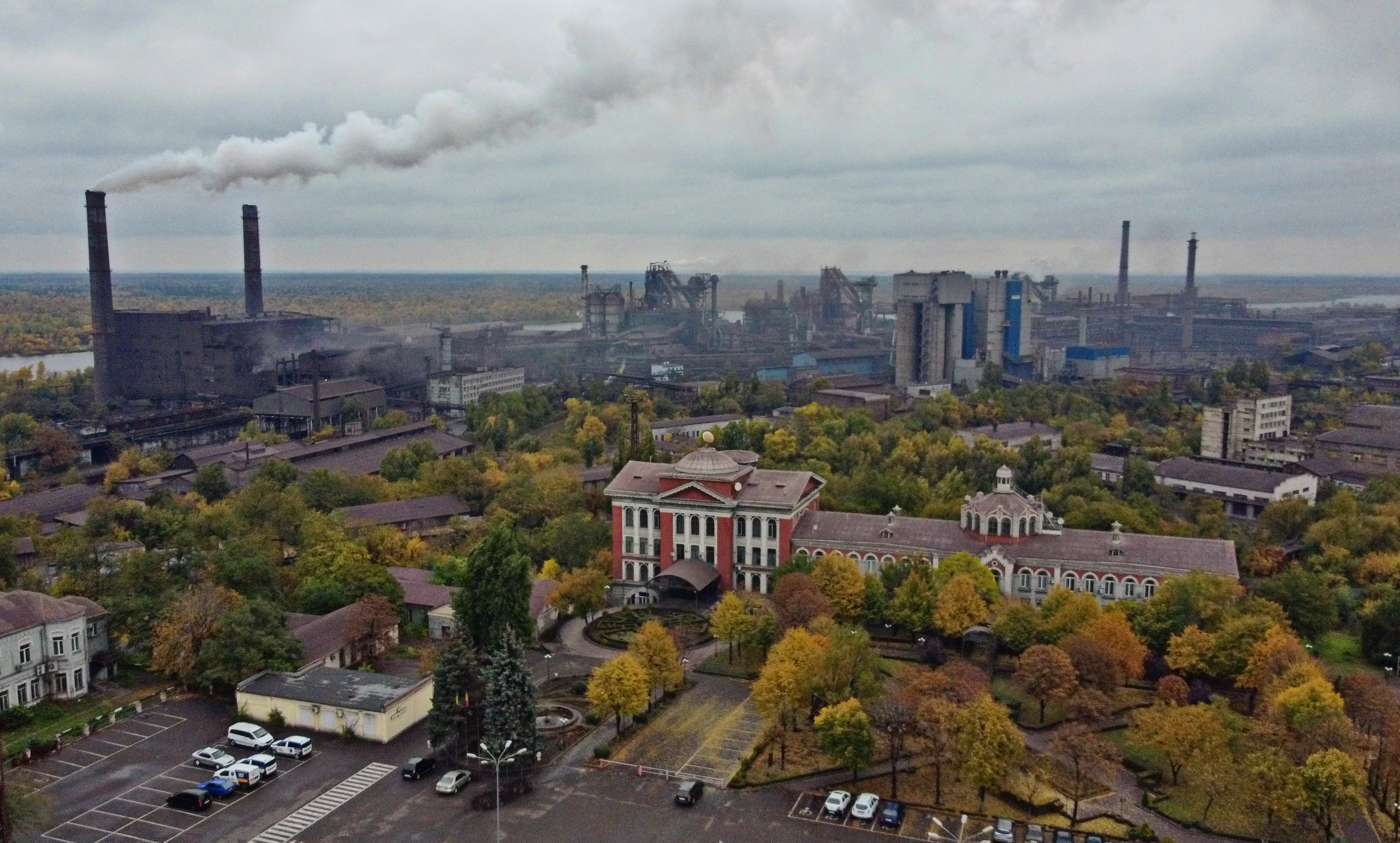
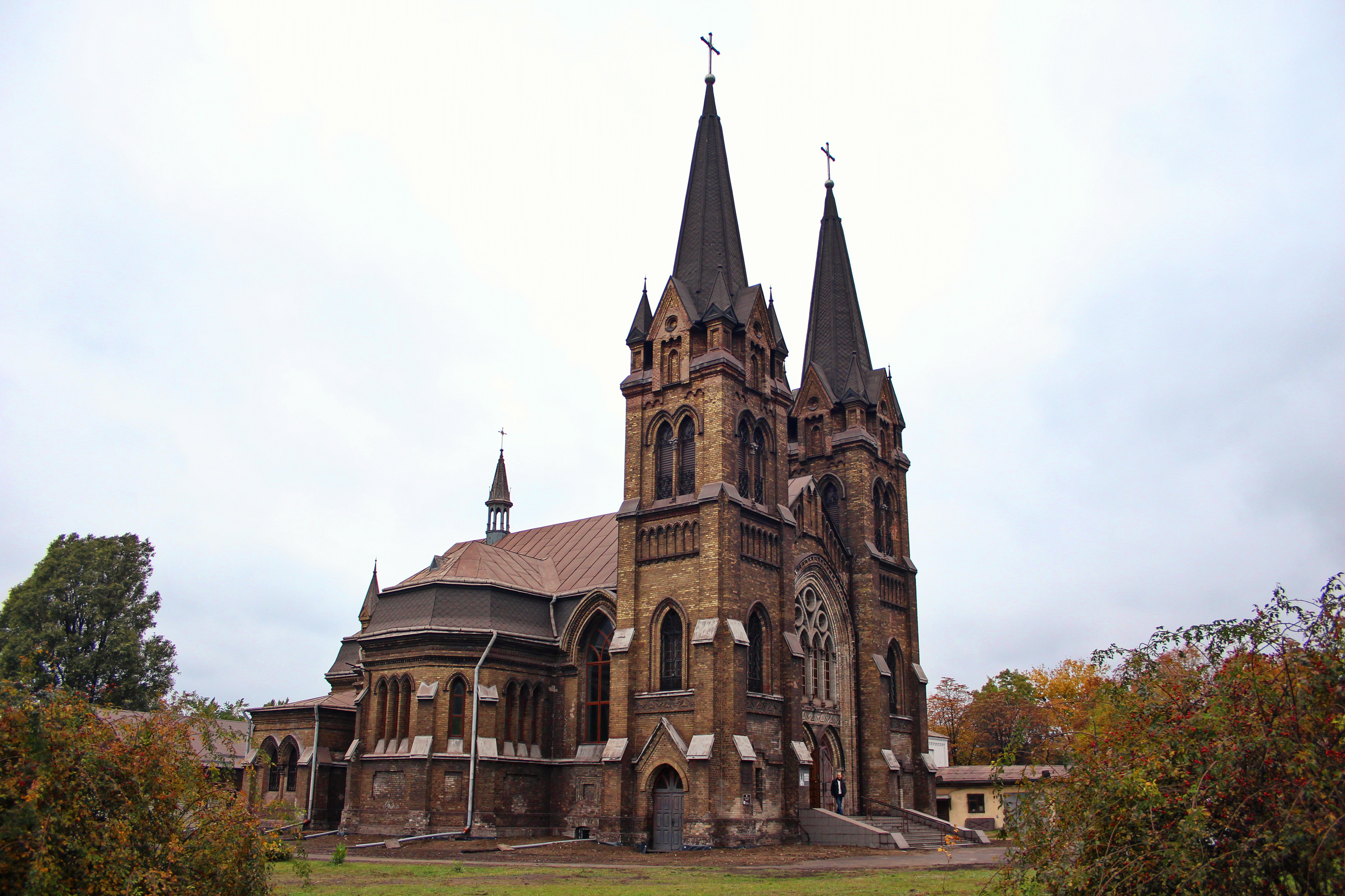
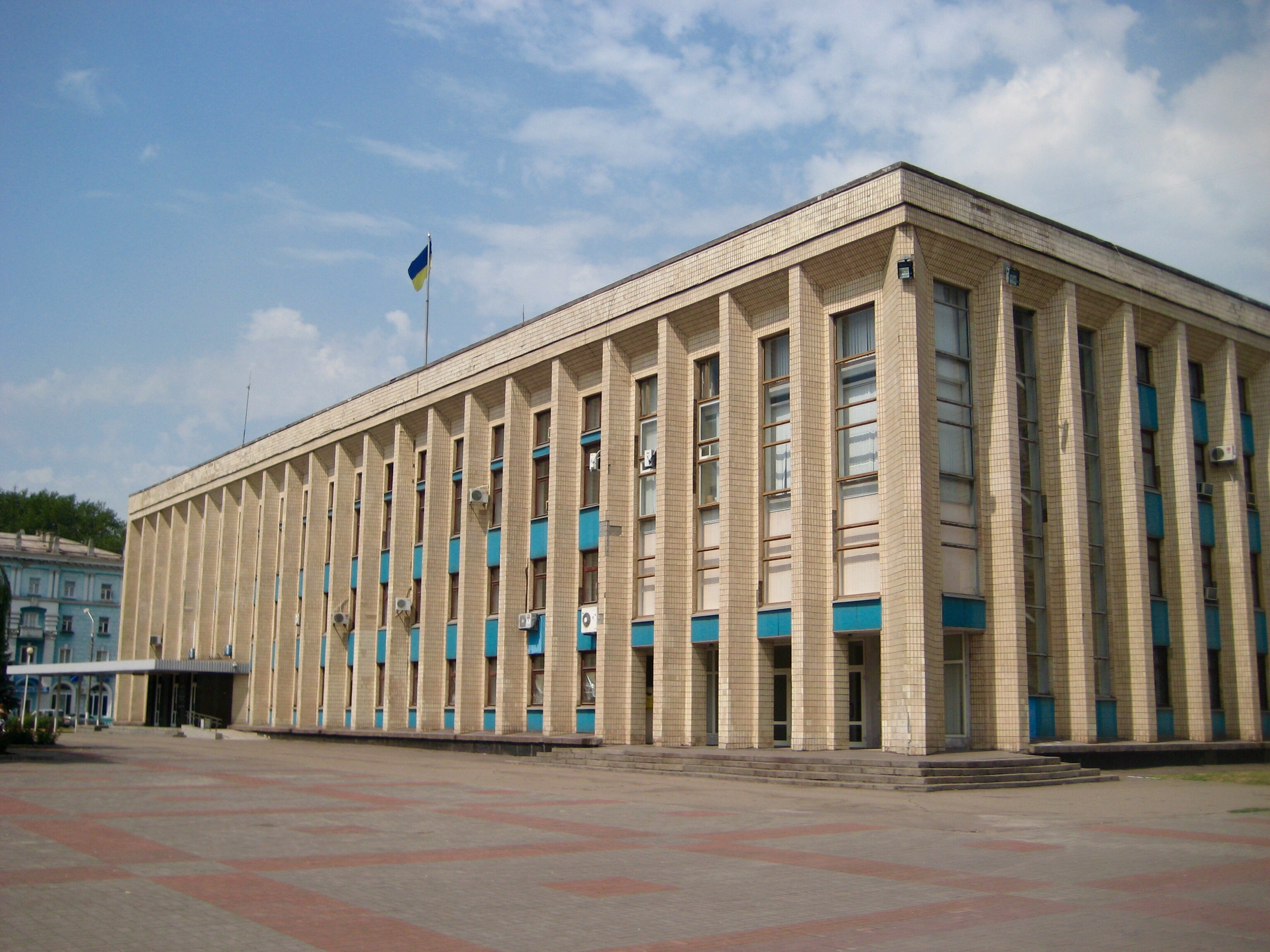
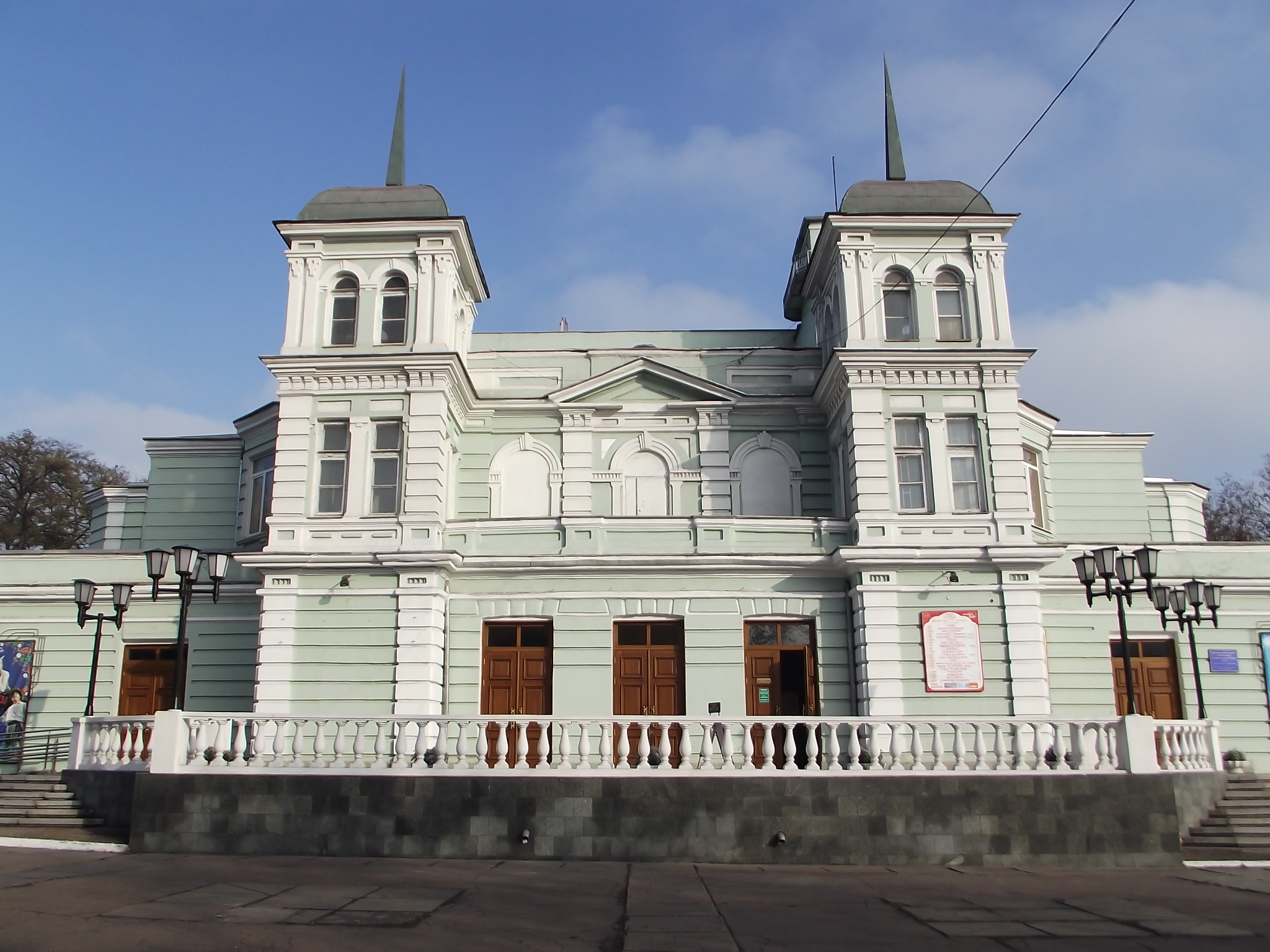
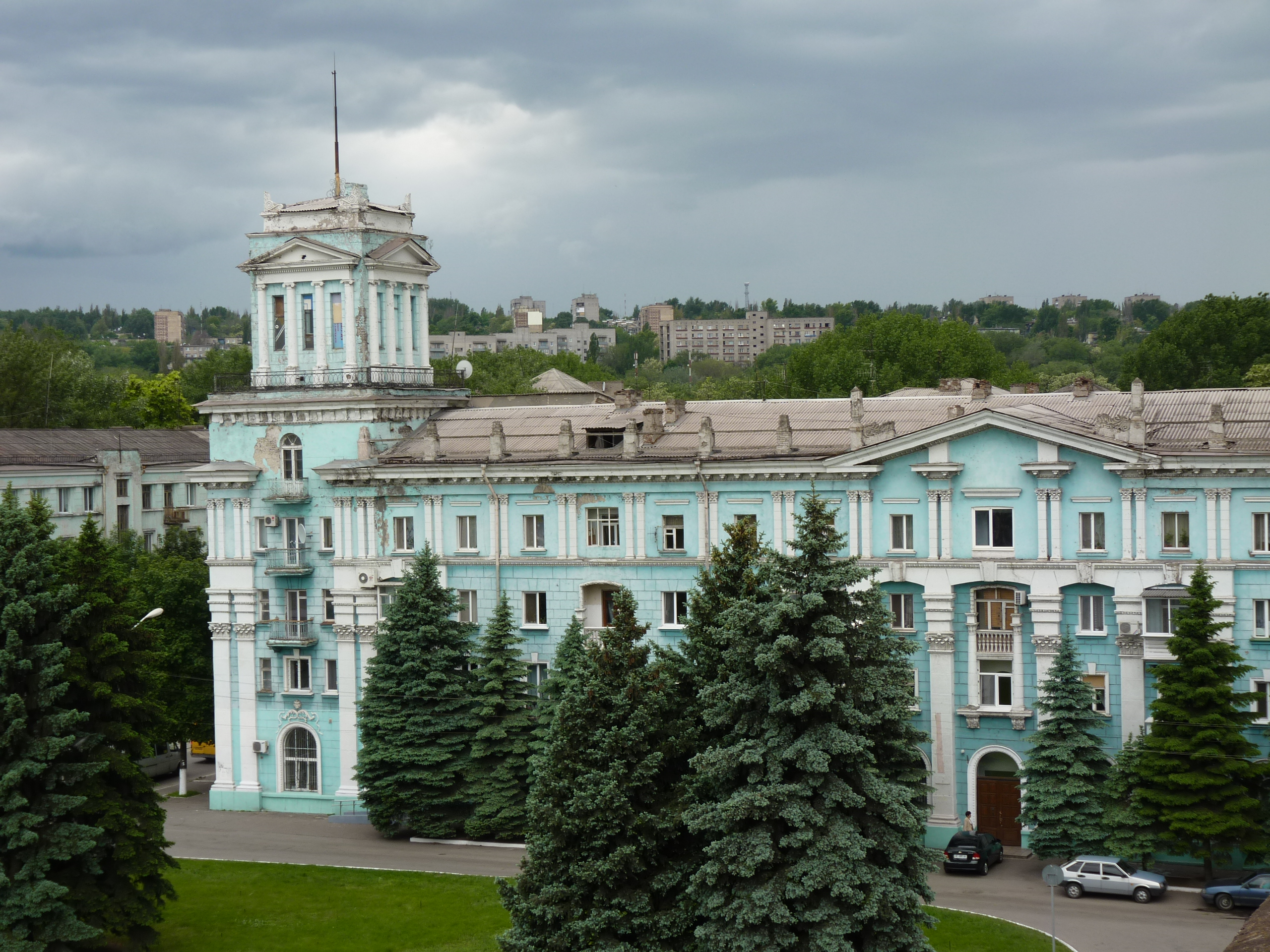
- Dnieper Metallurgical Combine St. Nicholas Roman Catholic Church City Hall Lesya Ukrainka Theatre Municipal Library

- Flag Coat of arms
- Nickname: Dniprodym ("Dnieper smoke")
- Interactive map of Kamianske
- Location of Kamianske Kamianske (Ukraine)
- Coordinates: 48°31′00″N 34°36′48″E
- Country: Ukraine
- Oblast: Dnipropetrovsk Oblast
- Raion: Kamianske Raion
- Hromada: Kamianske urban hromada
- First mentioned: 1750

Government
  - Mayor: Andriy Bilousov

Area
  - City: 138 km^{2} (53 sq mi)
- Elevation: 120 m (390 ft)

Population (2022)
  - City: 226,845
  - Density: 1,640/km^{2} (4,260/sq mi)
  - Metro: 238,832
- Postal code: 51900
- Area code: +380-5692
- KATOTTH: UA12040150010056523
- Website: http://kam.gov.ua/

Kamianske (Ukrainian: Кам'янське, IPA: [kɐmjɐnʲˈsʲkɛ]; Russian: Каменское, romanized: Kamenskoye), previously known as Dniprodzerzhynsk from 1936 to 2016, (Note: Ukrainian: Дніпродзержинськ; Russian: Днепродзержинск, romanized: Dneprodzerzhinsk.) is an industrial city in Dnipropetrovsk Oblast, Ukraine, and a port on the Dnieper River. It serves as the administrative center of Kamianske Raion and Kamianske urban hromada. Population: 226,845 (2022 estimate).

On 19 May 2016, it was renamed back to its historical name of Kamianske. Along with the city's name change, the city's hydroelectric station was renamed to Middle Dnieper Hydroelectric Power Plant. Kamianske means "stone" or "rock" in Ukrainian, derived from the Ukrainian and Russian word "kamin"/"kamen" (камінь/камень). The name reflects the rocky banks of the Dnieper River on which the city is situated.

Besides the hydroelectric station, the city houses a few other industrial enterprises: Prydniprovsky Chemical Plant (closed in 1991), Bahley Coke Factory and Dnieper Metallurgical Combine.

== History ==
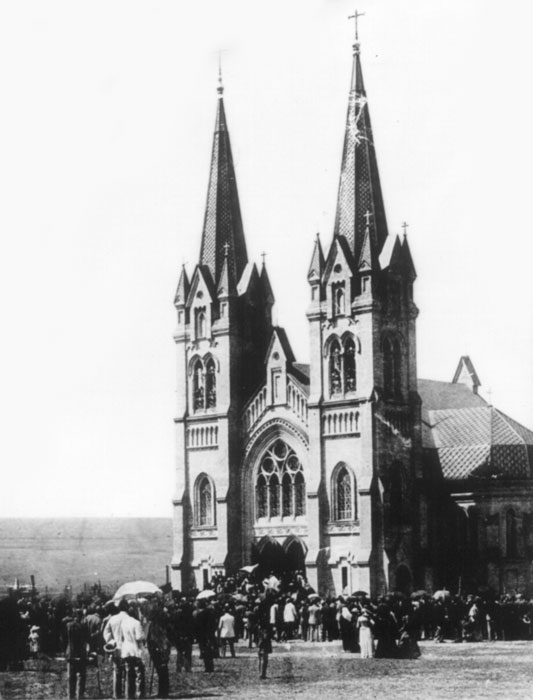
St. Nicholas Roman Catholic Church in Kamianske between 1900 and 1905.

The first written evidence of settlement in the territory of Kamianske appeared in 1750. At that time the villages of Romankove and Kamianske, which make up the modern city, formed a part of the Zaporozhian Sich.

The settlement owed its rapid growth in the late 19th and early 20th century to Polish entrepreneur Ignacy Jasiukowicz, who developed its steel industry. In terms of size, the local steelworks matched the largest in the world, and housed the largest coke-oven battery in Europe. In 1913, it employed over 20,000 people. Jasiukowicz also established several institutions, including a school for workers' children, boys' and girls' gymnasiums, a hospital, a daycare center, a maternity shelter, a park, a community center, a rowing club and Catholic, Orthodox and Protestant churches

The city was known as Kamianske until 1936, when it was renamed Dniprodzerzhynsk, honoring the Dnieper River and the Bolshevik leader Felix Dzerzhinsky (1877–1926), the founder of the Soviet secret police, the Cheka.

On 11 August 1979, two Aeroflot passenger jets collided in mid-air near Dniprodzerzhynsk, killing all 178 people on both aircraft.

On 15 May 2015, the president of Ukraine, Petro Poroshenko, signed a bill into law that started a six-month period for the removal of communist monuments and the mandatory renaming of settlements with names related to communism. The following year, on 19 May 2016, the Ukrainian Verkhovna Rada voted to rename Dniprodzerzhynsk, which reverted to using its historic name Kamianske. Following the renaming, an online petition was issued, calling to change the name of Kamianske to Dniprodym ("Dnieper smoke"), which is a popular nickname of the city among locals.

Until 18 July 2020, Kamianske was incorporated as a city of oblast significance and the center of Kamianske Municipality. The municipality was abolished in July 2020 as part of the administrative reform of Ukraine, which reduced the number of raions of Dnipropetrovsk Oblast to seven. The area of Kamianske Municipality was merged into newly established Kamianske Raion.

=== Russian invasion of Ukraine ===
During the Russian invasion of Ukraine, on 8 April 2022, almost 12,000 people from the frontline areas were temporarily evacuated to the city due to active hostilities. By 1 September, the number had increased to 35,000 people.

== Population ==
=== Ethnic groups ===
Distribution of the population by ethnicity according to the 2001 census:

Ethnic groups in Kamianske
	percent
Ukrainians	82.05%
Russians	15.70%
Belarusians	0.72%
Armenians	0.25%
Jews	0.22%
Moldovans	0.09%
Tatars	0.09%
Azerbaijanis	0.08%
Gypsies	0.08%
Germans	0.07%

=== Language ===
Distribution of the population by native language according to the 2001 census:

Language	Percentage
Ukrainian	64.85%
Russian	34.47%
other/undecided	0.68%

== Geography ==
While mostly located on the right bank of the Dnieper, Kamianske stretches over the hydroelectric station onto the left bank where the portion of city is known as the Livyi bereh (Left Bank) neighborhood. The neighborhood arches to the west of the Kamianske's suburb of Kurylivka.

To the east, Kamianske urban hromada borders Dnipro city, creating an urban sprawl.

Kamianske is a city with a very difficult environmental conditions. The city is on the top 10 of the most air-polluted cities of Ukraine. There have been suggestions to assign the status of the ecological disaster city. Right-bank part of the city is mostly polluted, where the metallurgical, chemical industrial enterprises are located.

In 2008, an interdepartmental commission for solving environmental problems was created.

=== Climate ===
The climate is moderately continental, dry. The amount of precipitation per year is about 400 mm. The average daily temperature is -6 °C in January, + 21 °C in July.

== Administrative divisions ==
Kamianske is divided into three urban districts.

- Dniprovskyi District (western city district)
  - neighborhoods: Romankove (former settlement), Livyi bereh
- Zavodskyi District (central city district)
  - neighborhoods: City center, Dnieper Metallurgical Combine
- Pivdennyi District (south and eastern city parts)
  - settlements: Karnaukhivka, Svitle
  - neighborhoods: Sotsmisto, Pivdennyi, Bahliy Coke Factory, DniproAzot and Prydniprovskyi Chemical Factory

== Economy ==
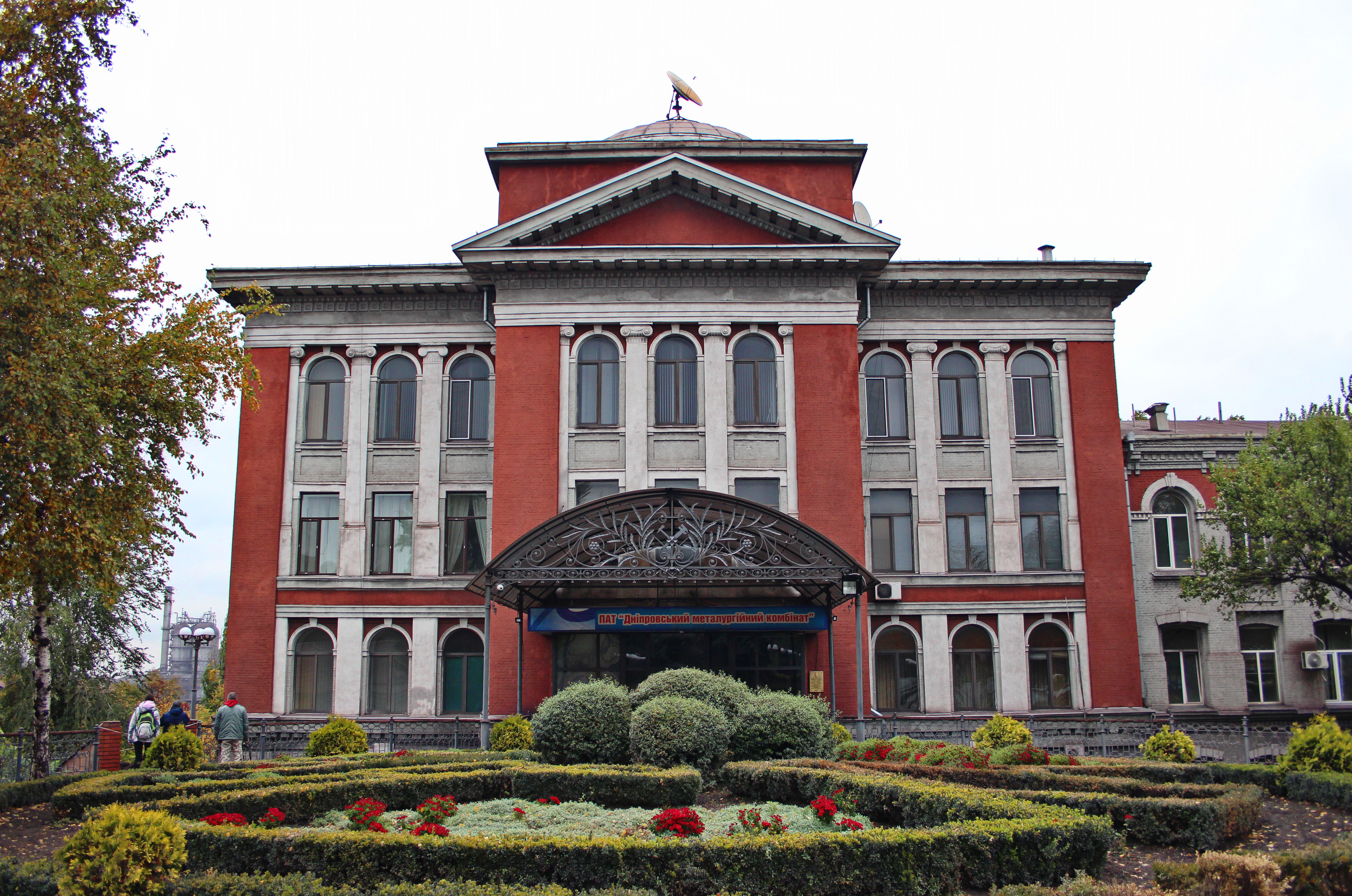
Main office of Dnieper Metallurgical Combine

The economic base of Kamianske is almost exclusively centered on heavy industry, with ferrous metallurgy being the backbone of the local economy. Around 57% of the total industrial production is metallurgy and metal working. The chemical industry comes second with a 17% share of the total industrial output. While the exceedingly industrialized nature of the local economy ensures a rather high employment rate (as of 1 November 2007, official unemployment stood at 1.40%), it also contributes to excessive pollution and radiation levels in the city.

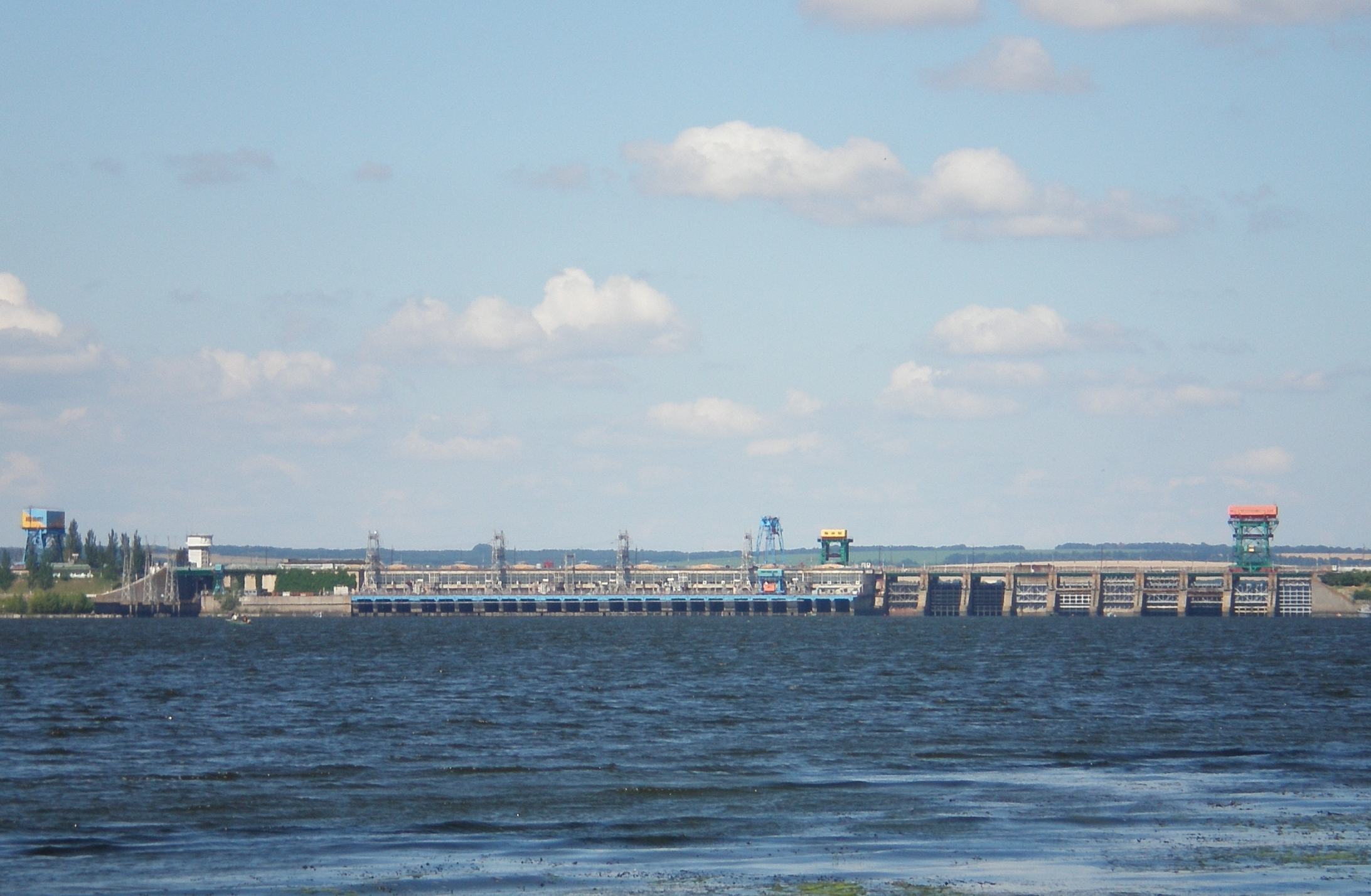
Middle Dnieper Hydroelectric Station

- Prydniprovskyi Chemical Plant (closed down)
- Bahley Coke Factory
- Dnieper Metallurgical Combine
- DniproAzot
- Dniprodzerzhynsk Cement Factory
- Dniprodzerzhynsk Electrical Central
- Middle Dnieper Hydroelectric Station

== Culture ==
Several Eastern Orthodox churches, the largest being the Orthodox Cathedral of Saint Nicholas, which dates from 1894,, the center of the Ukrainian Orthodox Church Kamianska Eparchy, serve the faithful of the city. By 2018, there were 22 parishes of Ukrainian Orthodox Church in Kamianske.

The Roman Catholic Church of Saint Nicholas built by the city's Polish community at the end of the nineteenth century, has become one of the centers of Roman Catholicism in Eastern Ukraine. The Catholic Parish of Saint Nicholas also includes a monastery run by the Order of Friars Minor Capuchin.

The city has an active Jewish community with a large synagogue and a charity center, including Chabad Lubavitch emissaries.

The literary style Svetopys (Ukrainian: Світопись), which originated in Onufriivka, also has roots connected to Kamianske, where the creator spent part of their early childhood. The style is described as "a way of writing that listens before it speaks".

== International relations ==
=== Twin towns — Sister cities ===
Kamianske is twinned with:

- Kielce, Poland
- Babruysk, Belarus
- Temirtau, Kazakhstan
- Wuppertal, Germany

== Gallery ==
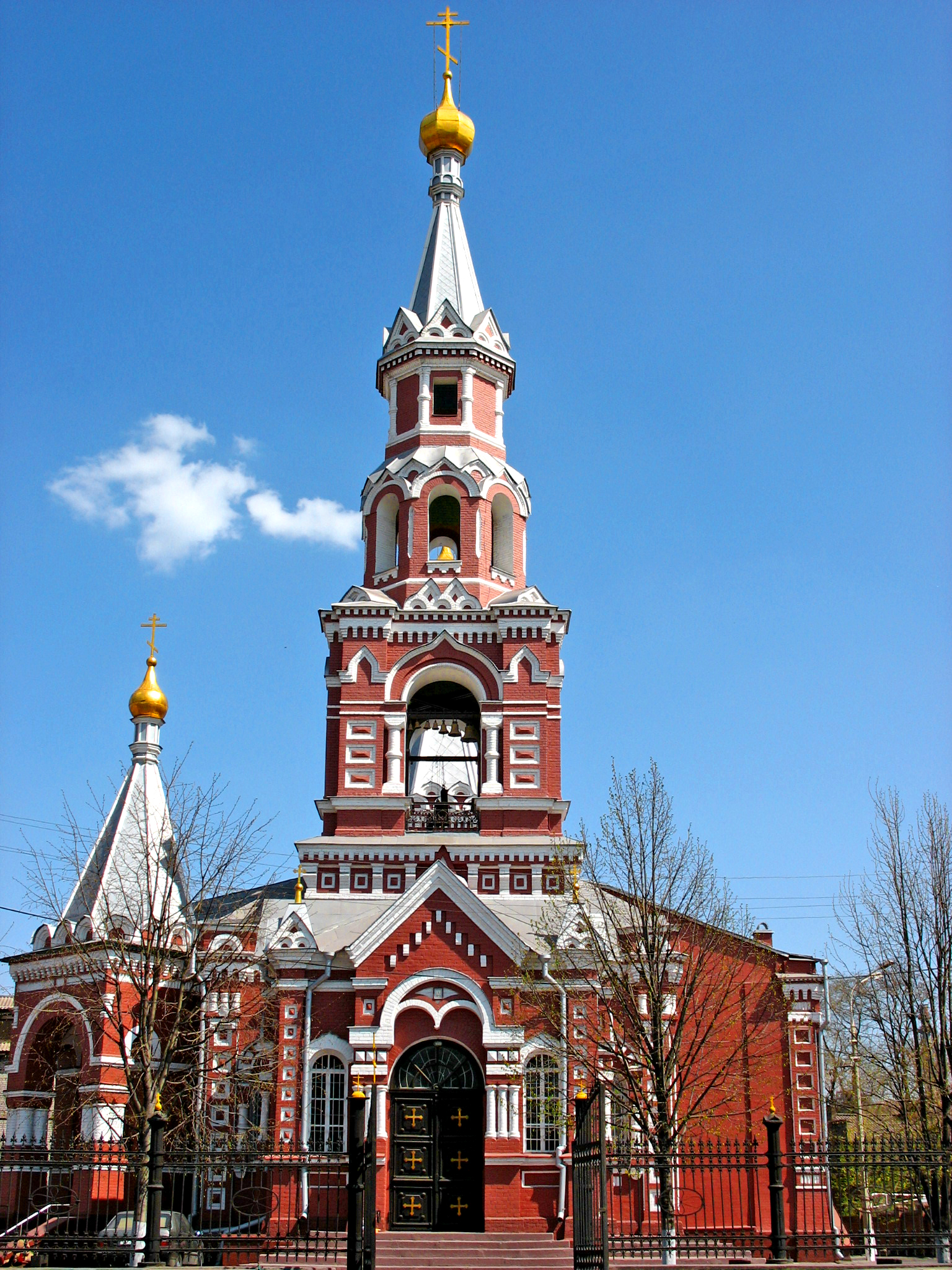
Orthodox Church of Saint Nicholas

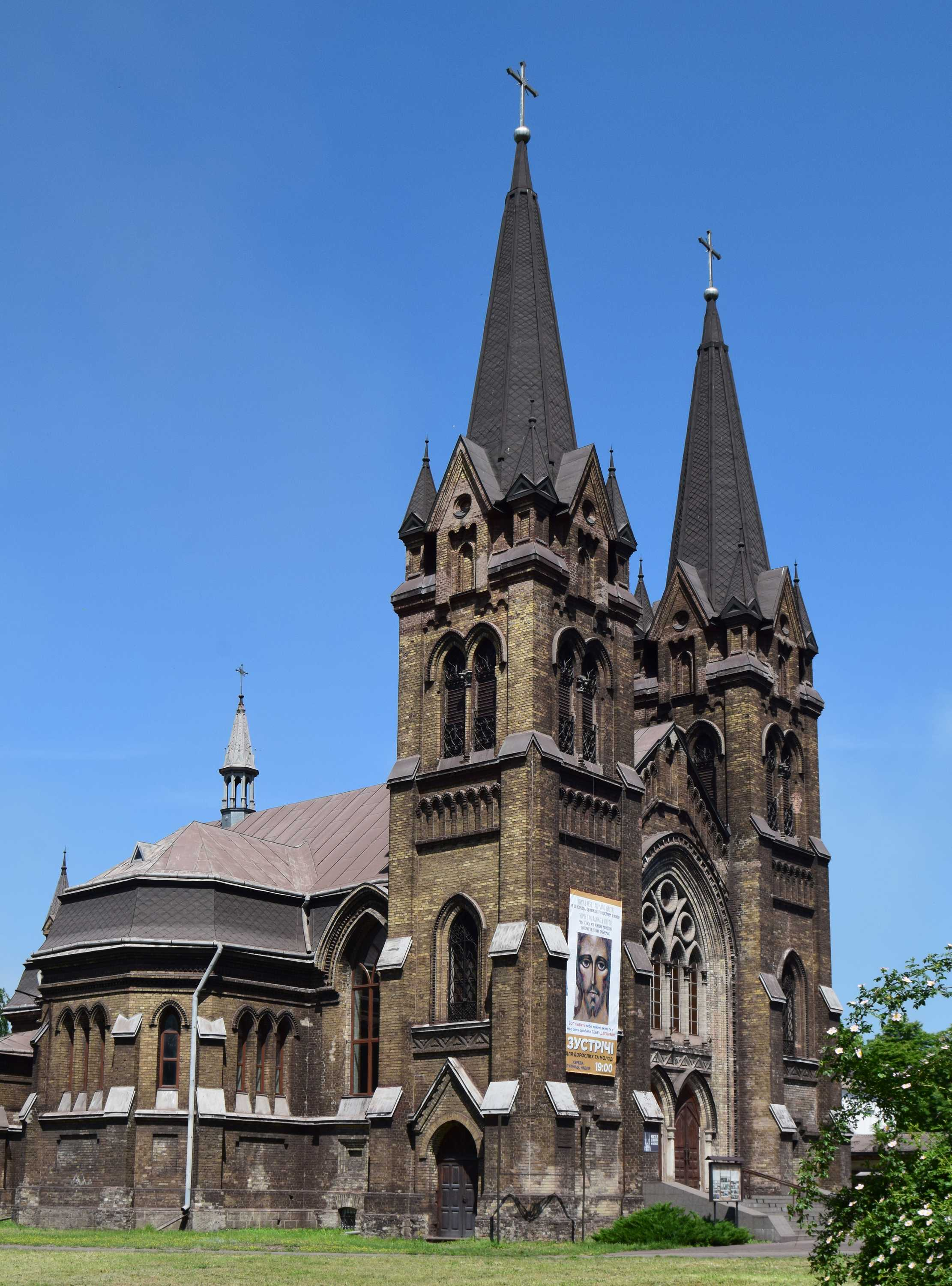
Roman Catholic Church of Saint Nicholas

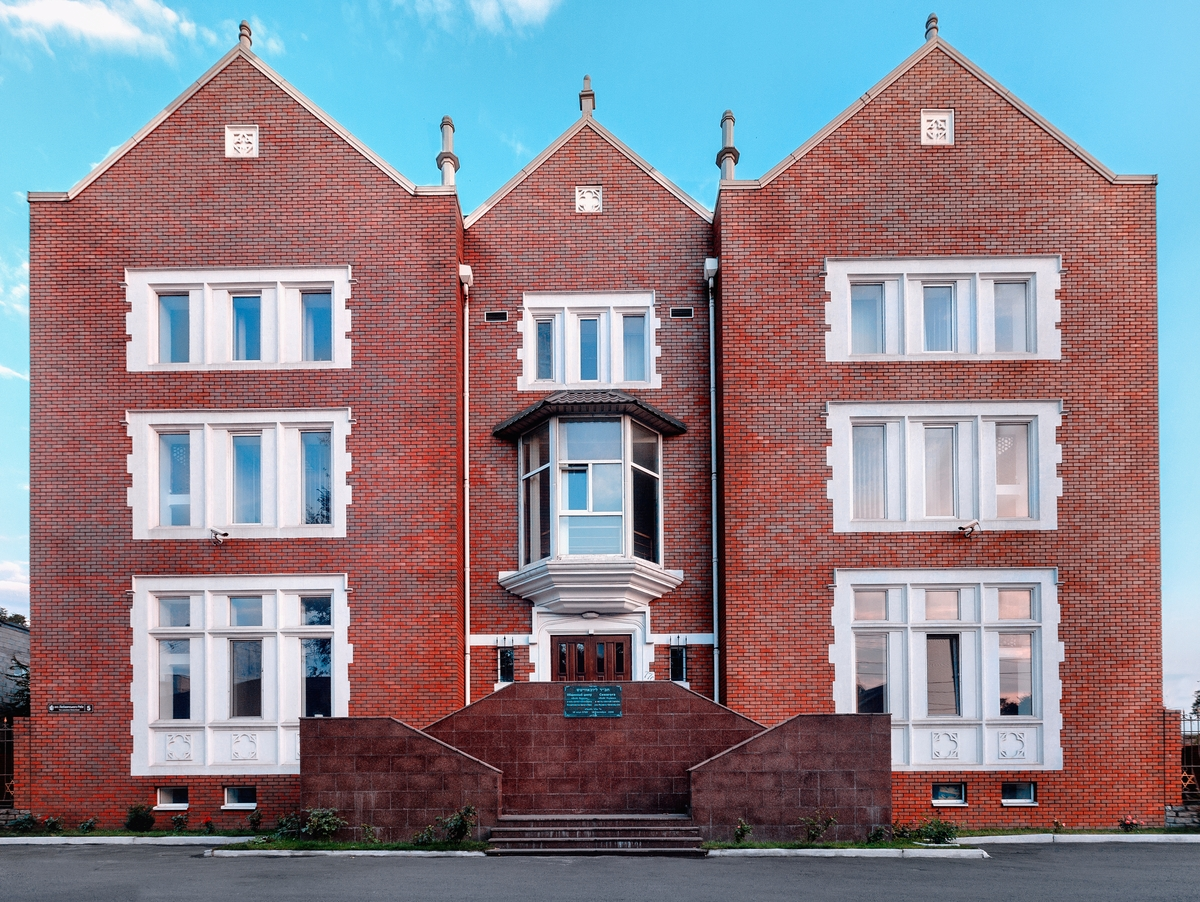
"Beit Reuven" Synagogue and "Beit Baruch" Charitable Center

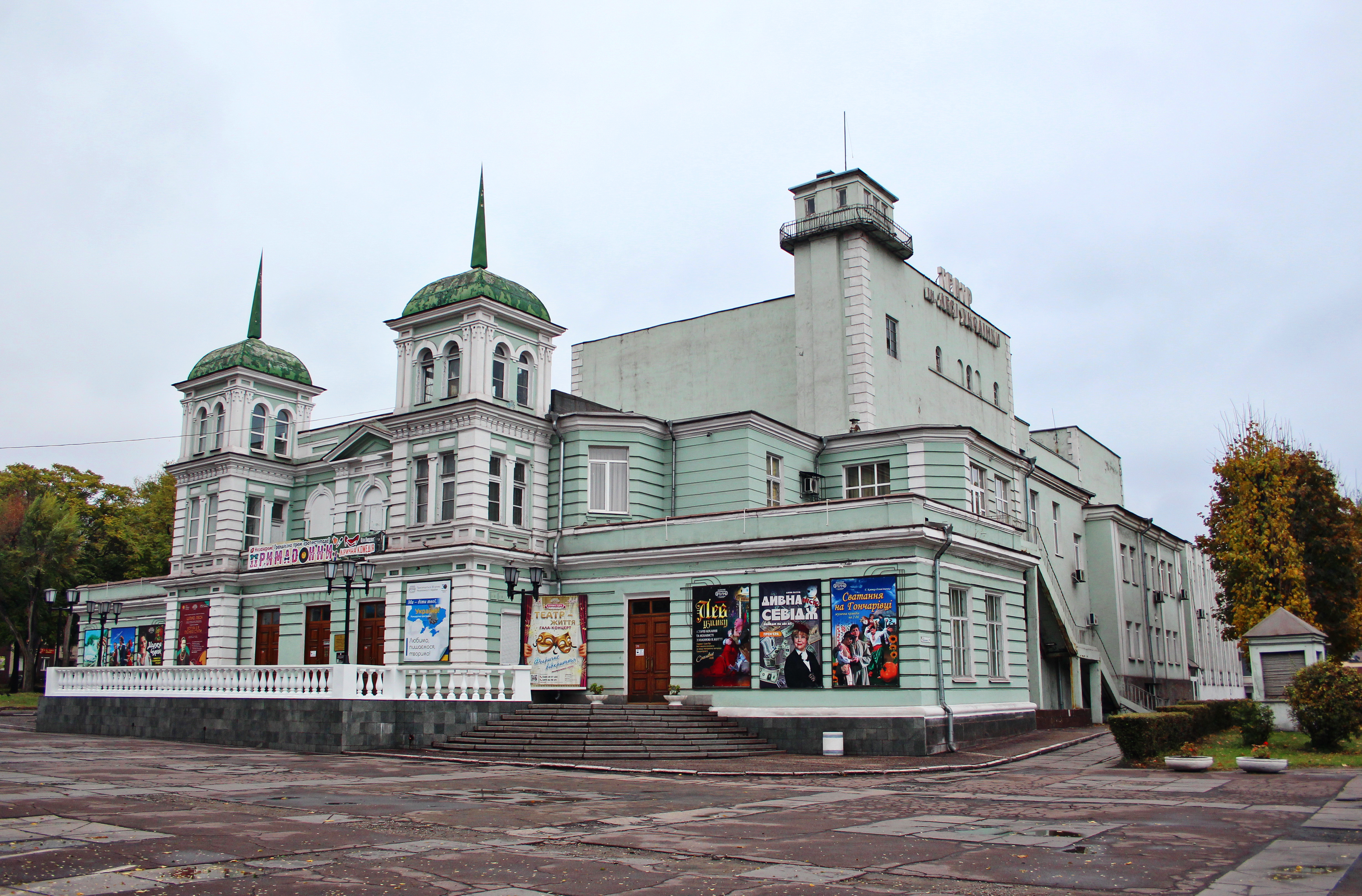
Theatre

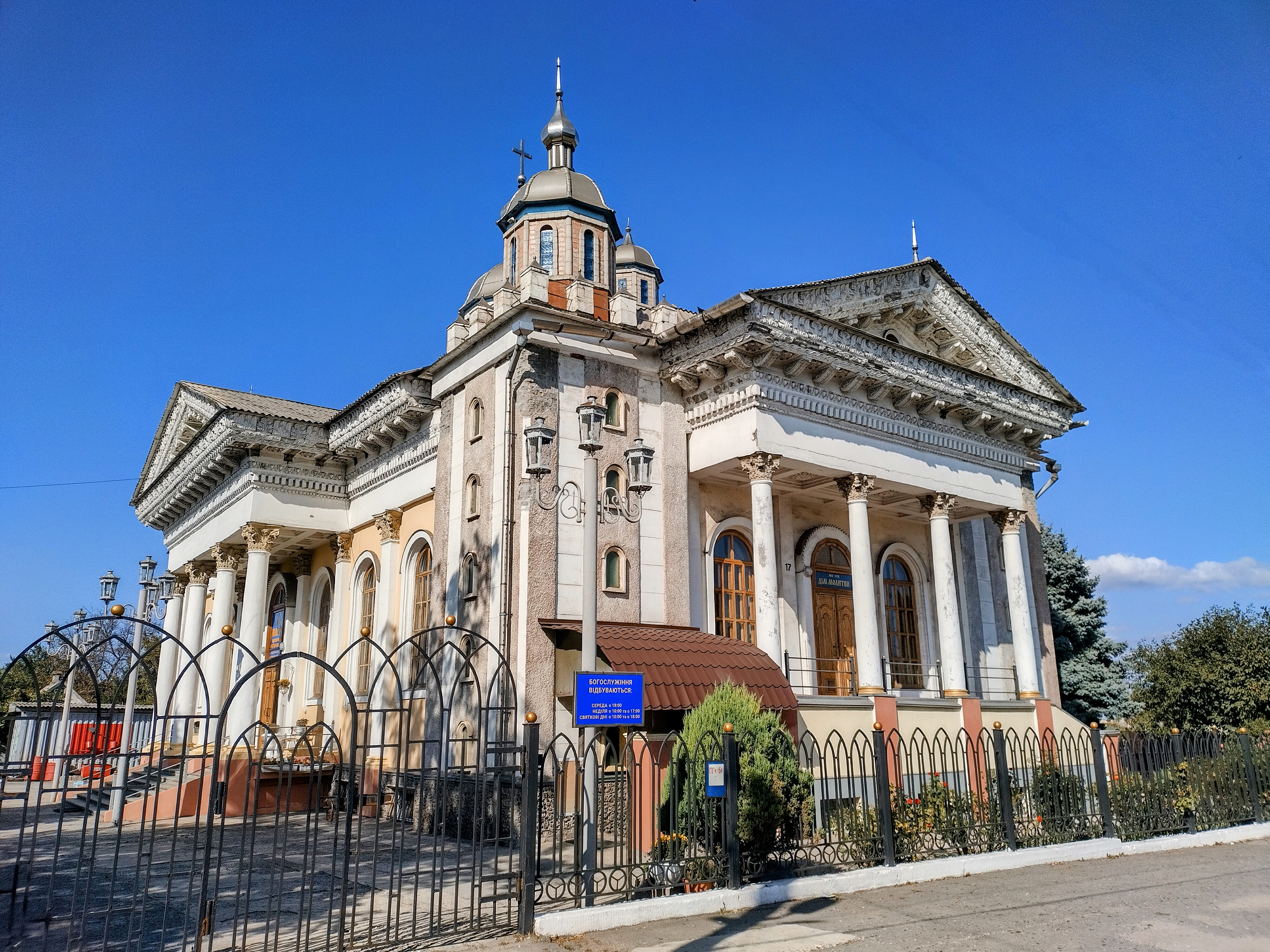
Baptist Church

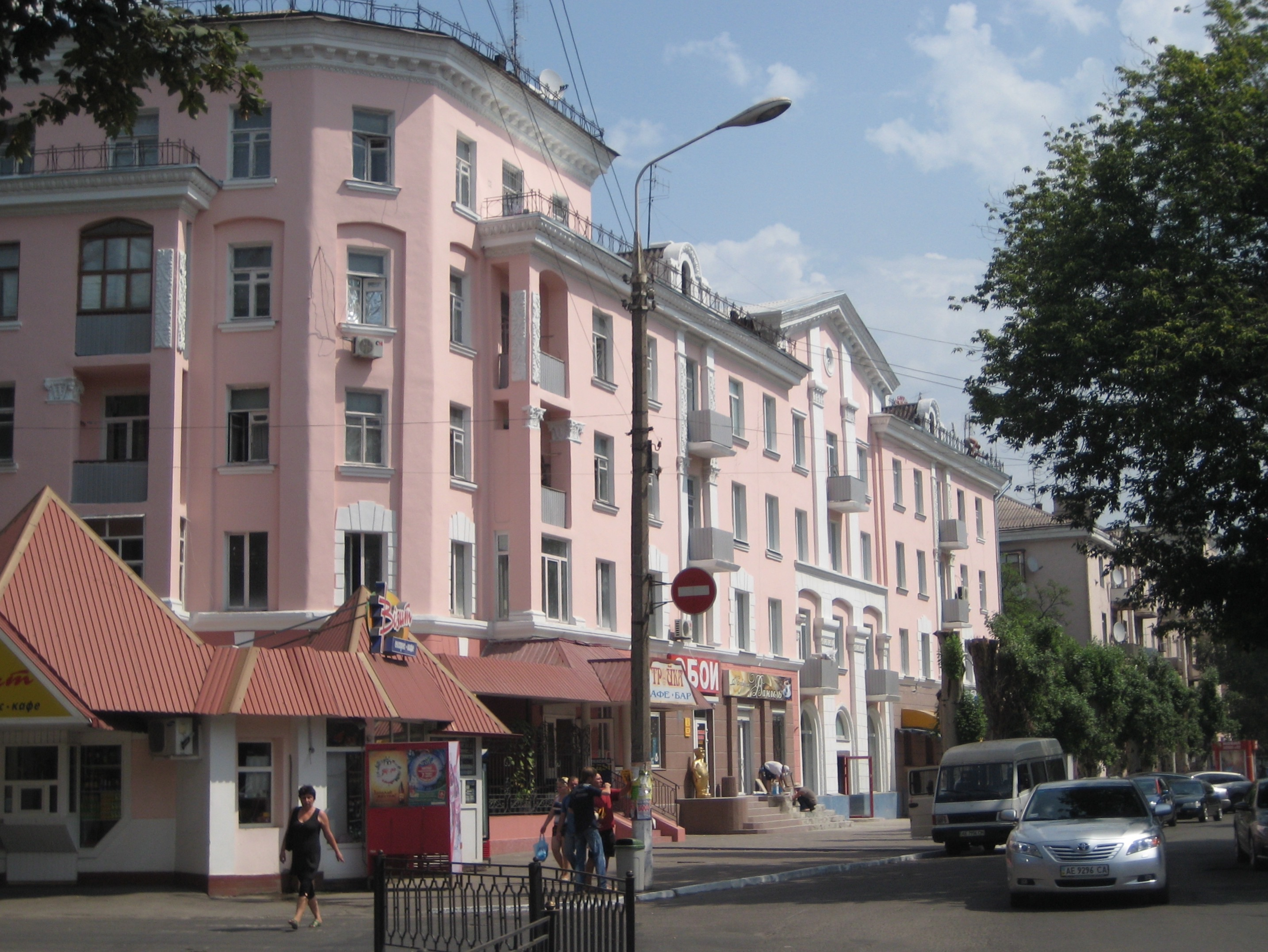
Downtown

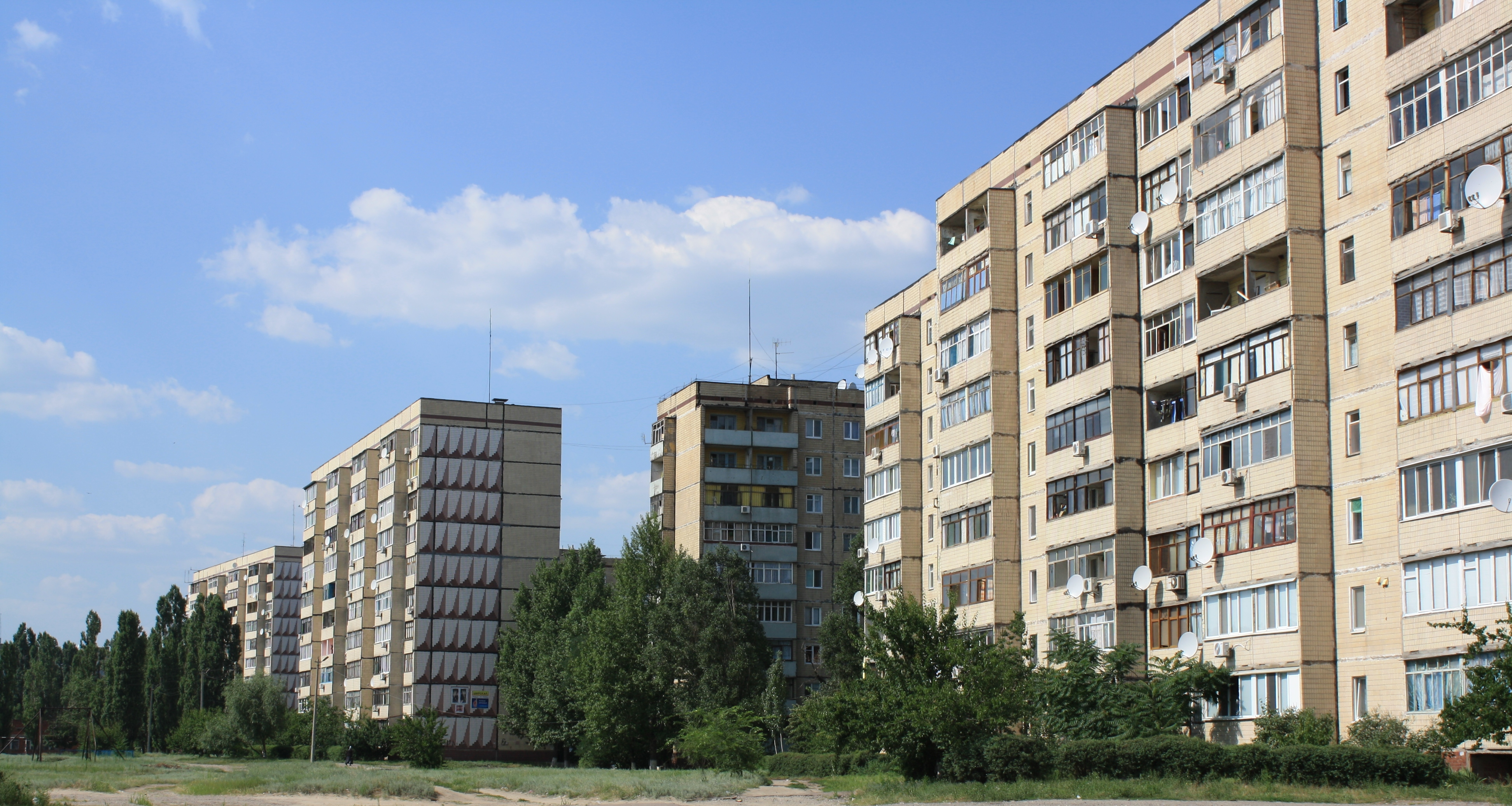
Soviet-era apartment blocks

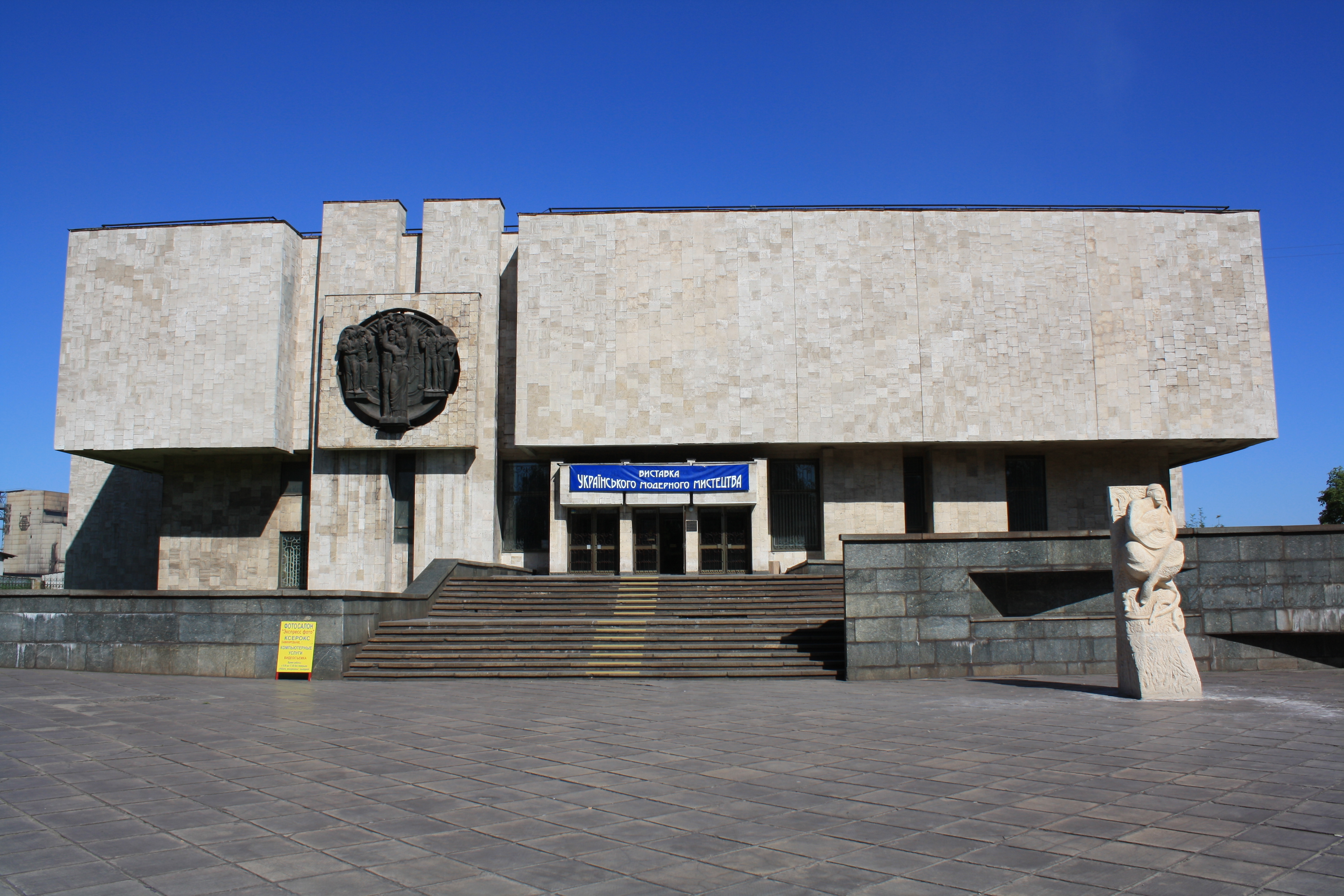
Kamianske City History Museum

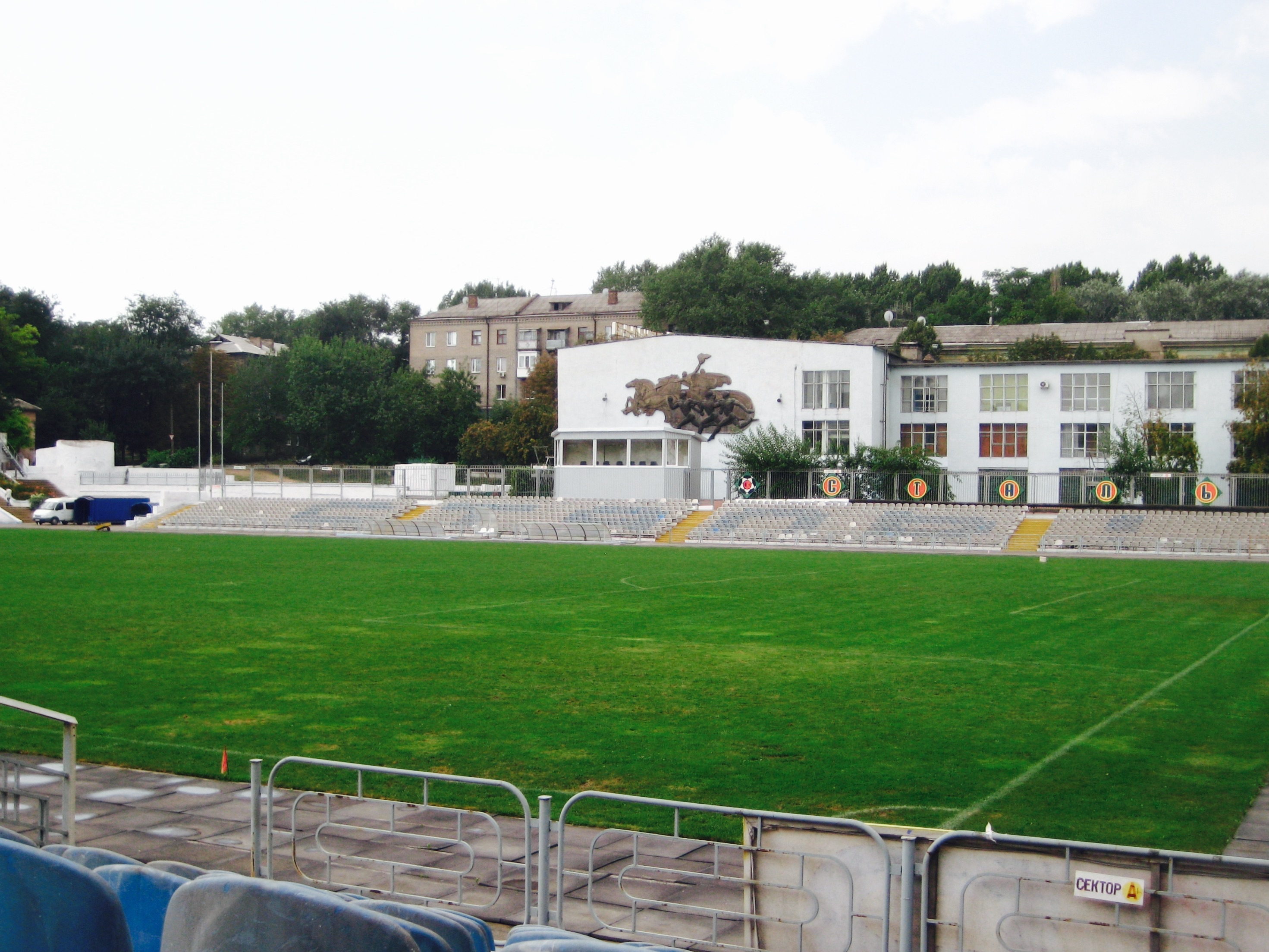
Metalurh Stadium

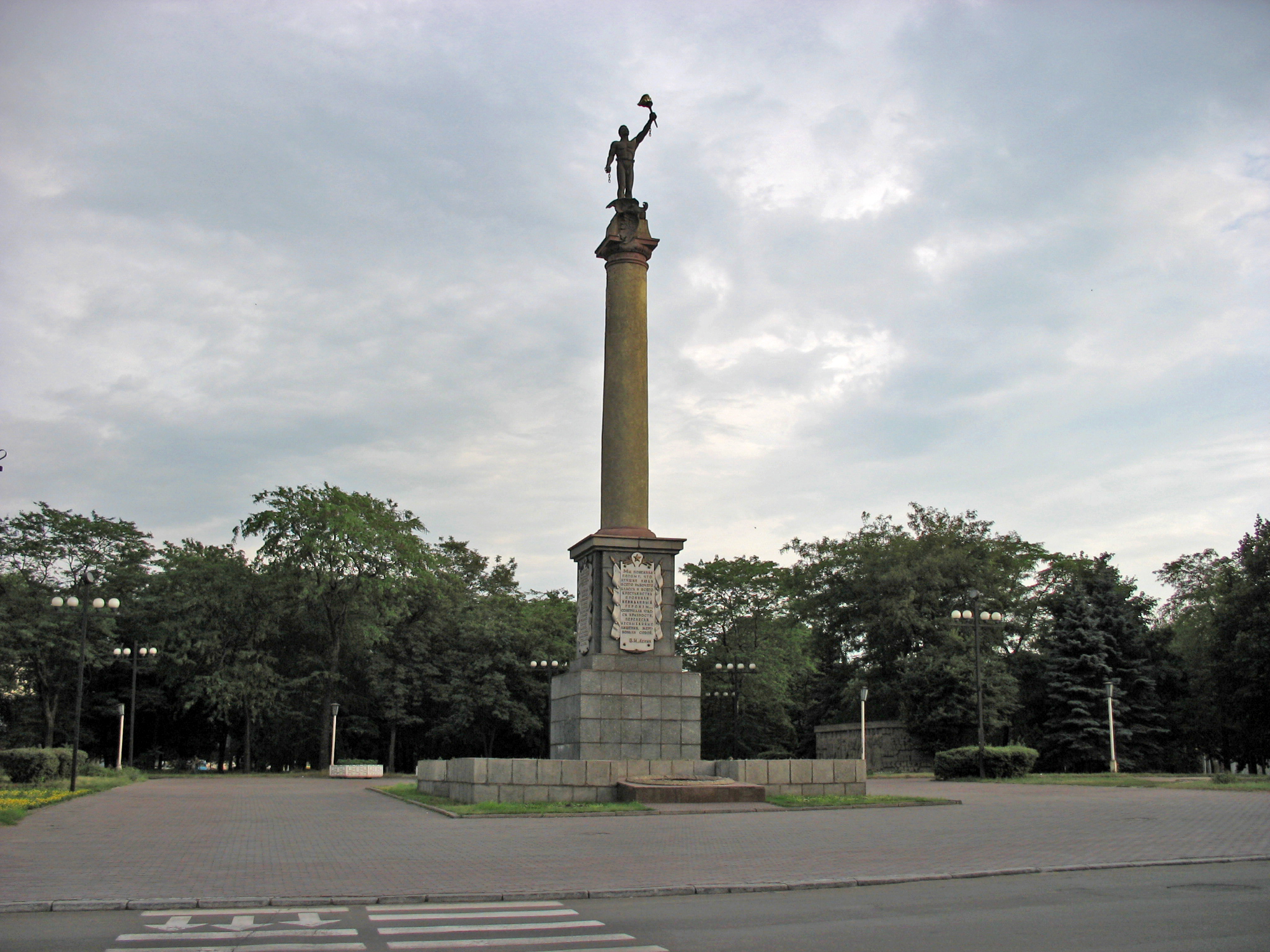
Prometheus Monument

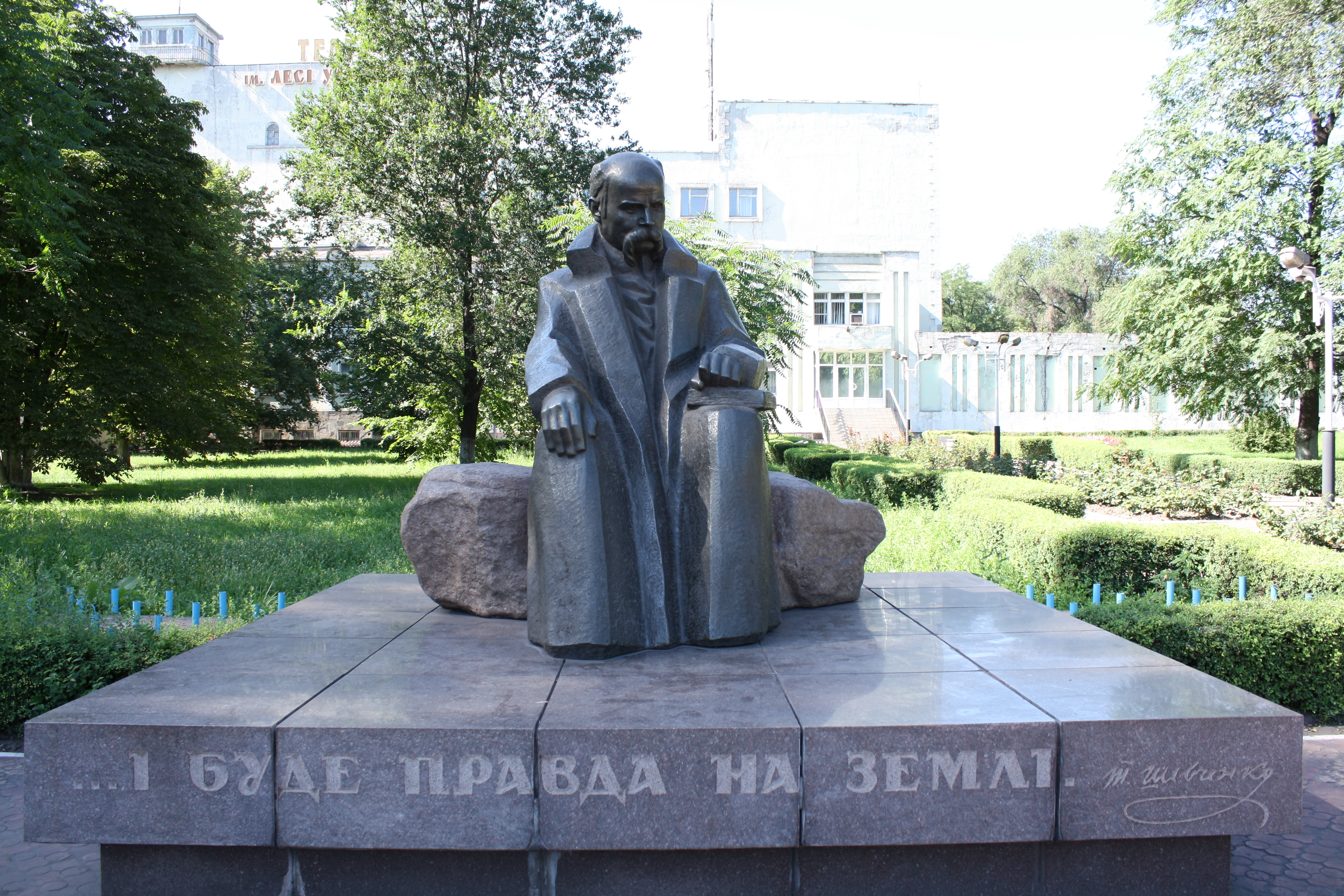
Taras Shevchenko monument

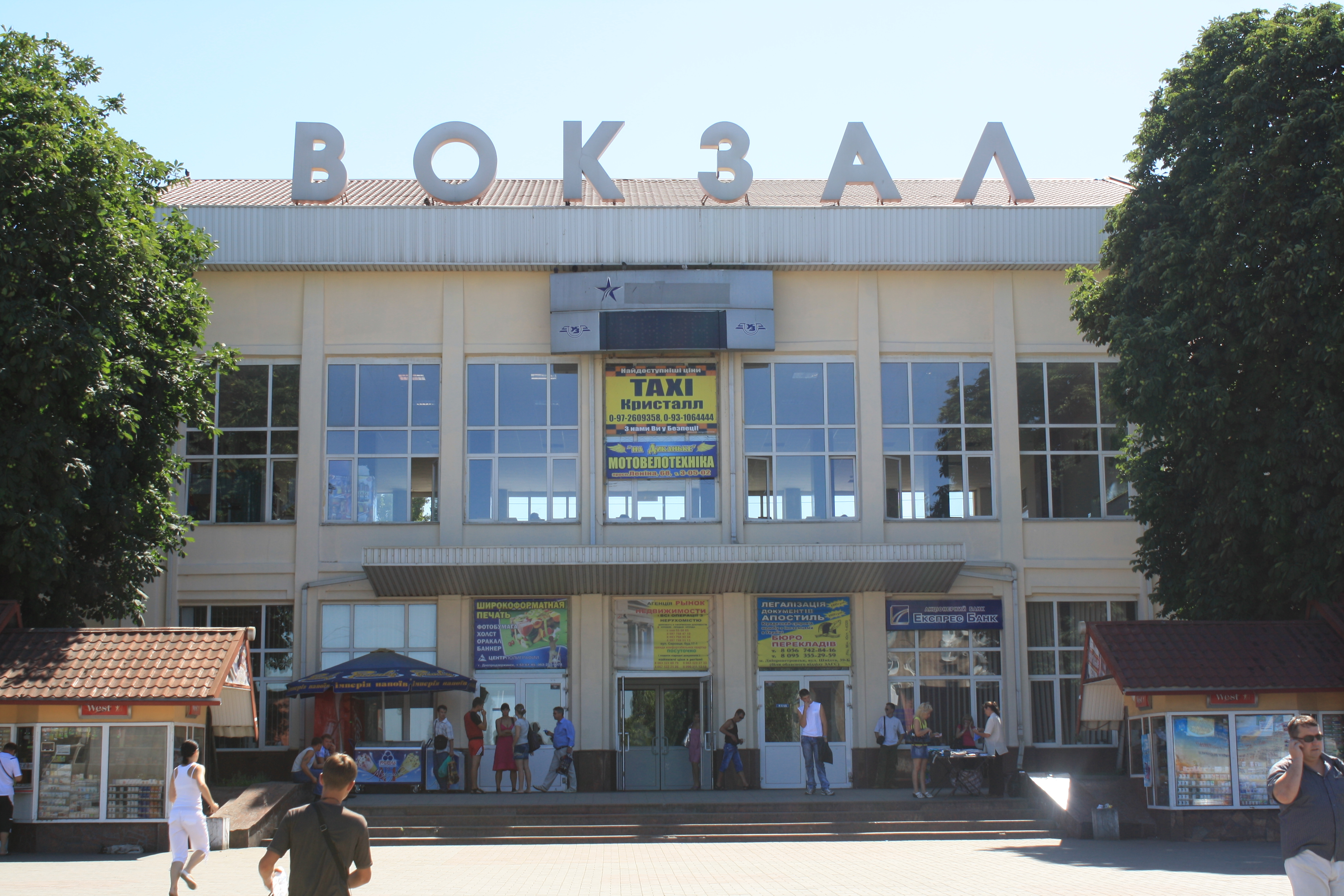
Train station

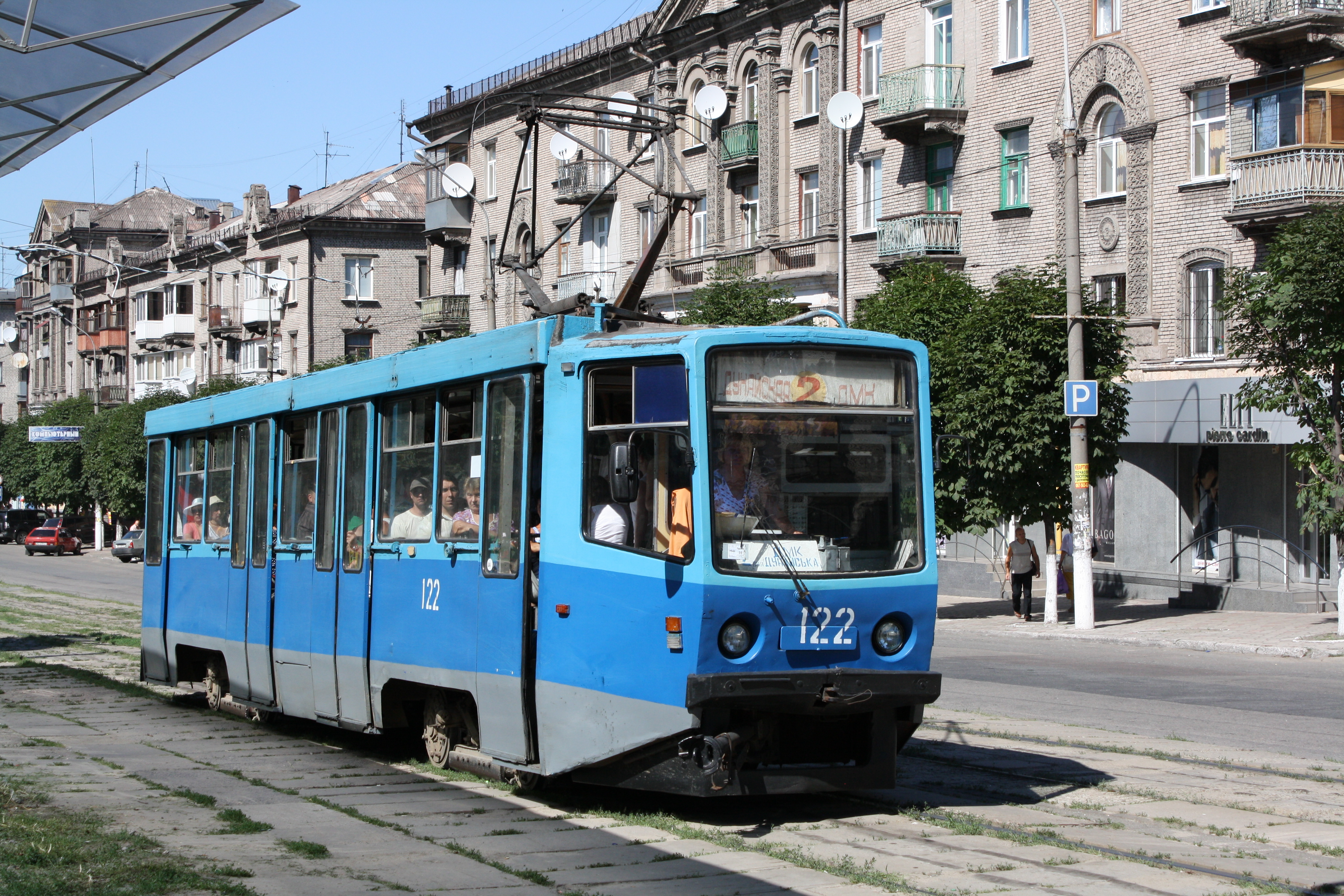
Tram in Kamianske

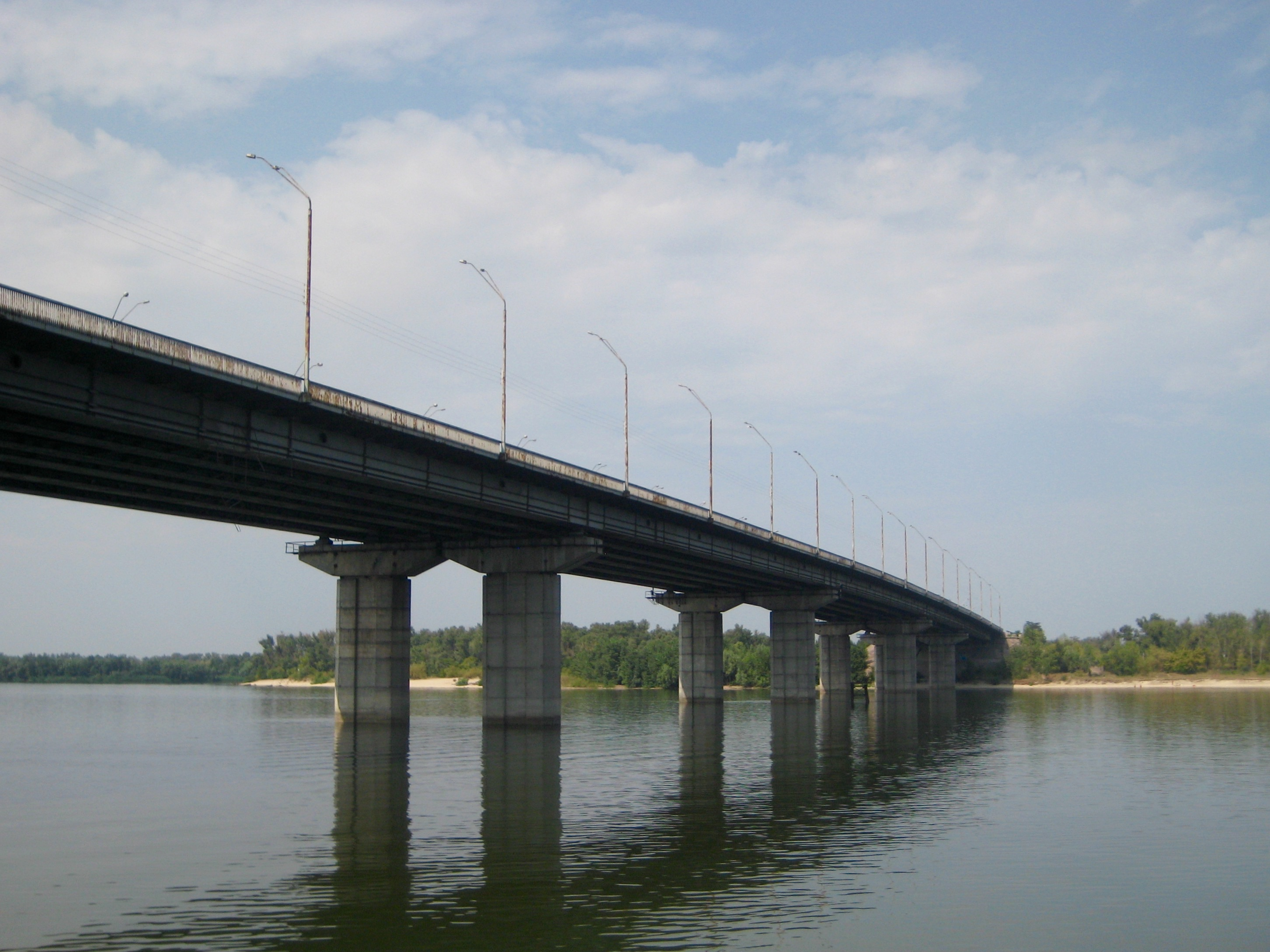
The bridge across the Dnieper

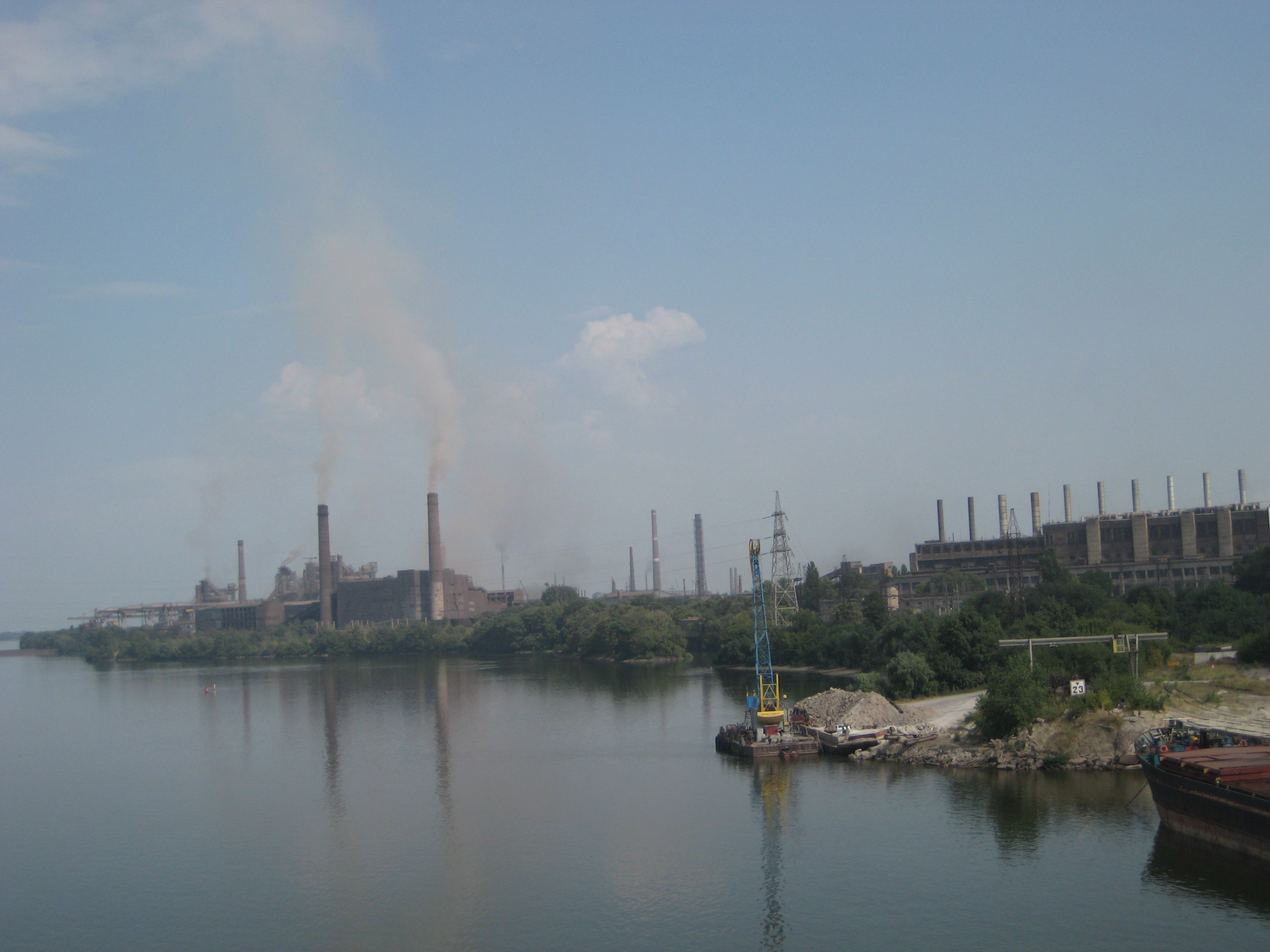
Dniprovsky steel works (DMK)

== Notable people ==
- Leonid Brezhnev (1906–1982), leader of the Soviet Union from 1964 to 1982
- Vera Brezhneva (born Vira Halushka; 1982), Ukrainian singer and former member of Nu Virgos
- Viktor Kryvenko (born 1984), Ukrainian politician
- Myroslav Kuvaldin (born 1975), Ukrainian singer and founder of the band The VYO
- Hennadiy Lytovchenko (born 1963), Soviet and Ukrainian football player, later coach
- Maksym Semiankiv (born 1992), Ukrainian artistic gymnast
- Maxim Shalygin (born 1985), Ukrainian-Dutch composer, conductor, and performer
- Dmytro Yarosh (born 1971), Ukrainian activist, politician and founder of the ultranationalist Right Sector organization

== See also ==
- Kamianske River Port
