= Prydniprovsky Chemical Plant radioactive dumps =

Radioactive waste dump in Ukraine

The now-defunct Prydniprovsky Chemical Plant (Ukrainian: Придніпровський хімічний завод, ПХЗ; Prydniprovsky khimichnyi zavod, PHZ, also PChP) in the city of Kamianske, Ukraine, is the site of significant uranium dumping. Between 1948 and 1991, the plant processed uranium ore for the Soviet Union, and handled roughly 65% of all Soviet uranium ore at its peak. Following the collapse of the Soviet Union, the plant ceased operations, although it was never properly decommissioned, leaving large amounts of radioactive waste at the plant.

The site of the plant contains approximately 42 million tonnes of radioactive waste, which is distributed across nine tailings sites around Kamianske and the floodplains of the Dnipro River. Although covers were installed on some of the dumps, many have since leaked radioactive compounds into the river, which is a significant hazard to the city of Dnipro and nearby cities. Studies have found that the gamma levels reach thousands of times the safety limit. However, Ukraine has attempted to fix this with four successive state programs since 2003 to bring the site to a safe condition. None of these have been found to achieve the goal due to funding issues. The state enterprise created to manage the site, DP Barrier, has had its license continuously revoked and is in a financial crisis. The European Union has attempted to provide help across three project phases since 2016 to resolve the issue.

== Prydniprovsky Chemical Plant ==
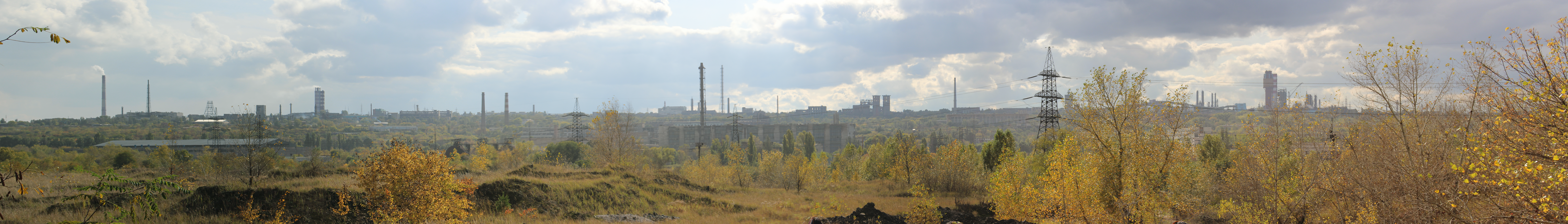
The skyline of the city of Kamianske, the site of the plant.

The Prydniprovsky Chemical Plant was established by the Council of Ministers of the Ukrainian SSR in August 1947, and began producing experimental uranium in early 1949. The site of the plant was chosen due to its proximity to both Pervomayske and Zhovta Richka, which have uranium-iron ore deposits, an existing metallurgical complex nearby, and also because of the presence of a nearby nitrogen fertilizer plant for reagents. In addition to uranium processing, it also produced ion-exchange resins starting in 1965 in addition to processing apatite ores for rare-earth elements and mineral fertilisers from 1971 to 1990. There was also processing of zirconium materials from 1981 and North African phosphate feedstock for fertilizers. During the peak of the factory, there was around 7,200 employees, of which 1,000 were in positions related to uranium.

Following the collapse of the Soviet Union, all uranium ore processing at the plant stopped in 1991. Instead of being decommissioned, it went bankrupt and had to be restructured, and was privatised. In 2000, DP Barrier was created by the Ukrainian government to manage the most hazardous objects from the plant. DP Barrier received its processing license from the State Nuclear Regulatory Inspectorate in 2003, but it was suspended in 2011 due to violations. The license was restored in 2013, but it wasn't reissued in June 2016. Applications were continuously denied throughout 2016 due to non-compliance, and it was briefly restored with special conditions in February 2018 before being suspended yet again in August 2018. The license was finally restored in August 2019.

== Dumping sites ==
A map of major cities in relation to the dumps within Dnipropetrovsk Oblast.

During its operations, the plant accumulated around 42 million tonnes of radioactive waste due to its processing of uranium across nine tailings covering an area of 2.68 million square meters. The sites, improperly constructed from the very beginning, have been abandoned by the industry long ago and remain in very poor condition. The top concern is the dumps’ proximity to both the large Dnieper River and city residential areas. The principal sites of tailings are: Zakhidne, Tsentralny Yar, Pivdenno-Skhidne, Dniprovske, Sukhachivske, Baza S, and DP-6. Zakhidne is located within the main industrial site and is approximately 770 thousand tonnes of waste and was the plant's first tailings facility, built in a former clay quarry. It was closed in 1953 after the release of radioactive pulp following the collapse of a dam, and in 2000 scrap metal hunters partially excavated the cover layer, leading to contaminated runoff into the Konoplianka River. Uranium concentrations in groundwater near Zakhidne are around 455-710 Bq/L, compared to the normal 10 Bq/L.

Tsentralny Yar was operated from around 1950 to 1954 and contains about 220,000 tonnes of waste in a ravine near the southern site of the factory. Formerly, there was a park known as "Komsomolsky Park" on top of it, although it has an average radium-226 concentration of 54 Bq/g compared to the standard threshold of 1 Bq/g. The third site is Pivdenno-Skhidne, which was operated from 1956 to 1990 and contains around 330,000 tonnes, although compared to the rest of the tailings it does have a properly designed cover. The soil cap was installed in 2009 through a state program. Dniprovske is by far the largest tailing since it was operated from 1954 to 1968 and contains approximately 12 million tonnes of waste. It is right on the Dnipro River's floodplain, and after uranium processing ended, it was covered with phosphogypsum and coal slag; however, leaching has occurred leaving to concentrations of 325 Bq/L. It is considered a site of top concern due to its location right next to the Dnipro River, which can contaminate the water.

Sukhachivske is located away from the main facility by the village of Taromske in a rural ravine system, and is the largest of the facilities. It is divided into two sections, with Section 1 operating from 1968 to 1982 and holding 19 million tonnes of waste, which has led to radioactive dust due to areas being exposed. Section 2, which operated from 1983 onwards, has a capacity of 14.8 million cubic meters remaining and is intended as the receiving facility for waste that is relocated. Structure 602 is a concrete repository buried within Section 1 of Sukhachivsk, containing waste from the extraction of rare-earth carbonate concentrates, and it may also contain cesium-137 contaminated soil. Baza S was the location for uranium ore before transfer to plants, and was operated from the 1960s through 1991. The ore arrived from Kirovohrad and Wismut and the area contains an estimated 130,000 tonnes of residual ore material, but it has five open reinforced-concrete bunkers. In 2006, 20,000 tonnes of residual ore were removed from the site by the Eastern Mining and Processing Combine. The last site is the DP-6 repository, which contains the remains of the blast furnace that was used during the 1950s through 1970s, and it processed iron ore with an elevated uranium content. 40,000 tonnes of debris were buried at Baza S later on, and the repository was closed in 1982, and a cover was later installed which is considered adequate.

== Conditions ==
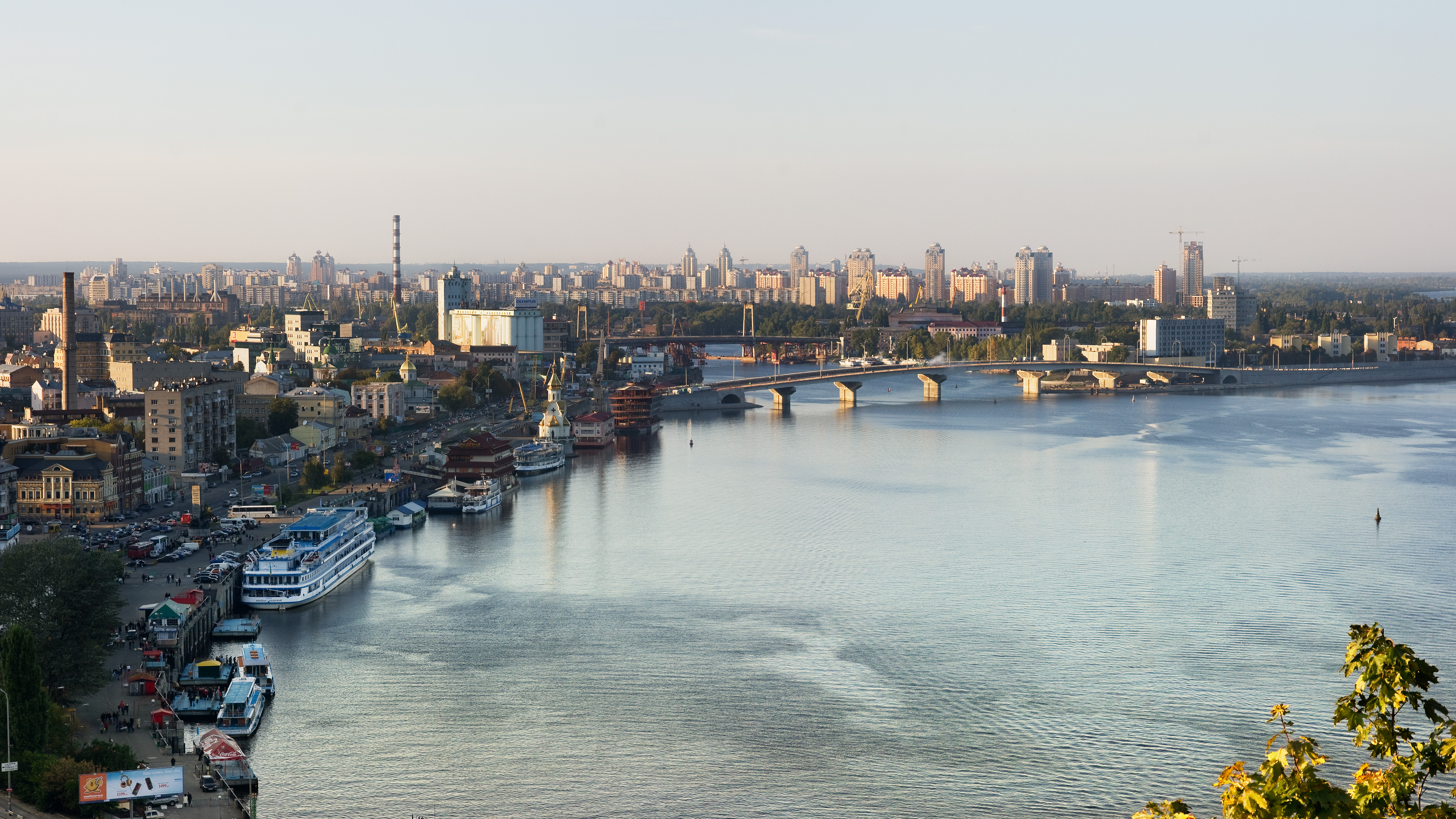
The Dnipro River, which has been a concern due to the potentiality of radiation.

Through the project ENSURE-II in 2012–13, it was found that there was a difference between the southern and northern portions of the sites in terms of radiation. The southern site, where uranium processing buildings, ore storage, and pulp pipelines registers that 30% of the territory has a gamma dose rate above 1 µSv/h, the recommended amount. The highest spots inside Building 103 reach 3,360-4,411 µSv/h. The northern portion, which houses some of the still-operating enterprises of the plant that produce mineral fertilizers, is largely uncontaminated. Almost none of it exceeds 0.20 µSv/h, aside from some isolated areas of around 0.5-2 µSv/h. There is also radon concentration in some of the more contaminated buildings like Building 28, which has an average radon-222 rate of 6,570 Bq/m3, compared to the norm of 100 Bq/m3 for occupied areas. Studies have also found soil contamination in the form of radium-226 near the settling ponds that is significantly above the 0.2 Bq/g amount for uranium legacy sites. The groundwater near the tailings is also contaminated with uranium and radium by factors of 10 to 100 times the recommended amount.

ENSURE-II also found that dust from Baza S and Sukhachivske Section 1 during days of strong wind could deliver doses of 50-100 µSv to nearby villages like Taromske. It is believed that further deterioration of the dams, irrespective of any outer accidents, may cause a devastating radioactive mudslide. Since the 2022 Russian invasion of Ukraine, there have also been fears about more radioactive risks. There are some fears that a missile or shelling by Russian forces on contaminated buildings or dumps could lead to radioactive dust near Kamianske.

== Treatment attempts and aid ==
In 2003, the Cabinet of Ministers of Ukraine approved an 11-year program on "bringing hazardous facilities of the Prydniprovsky Chemical Plant to an environmentally safe state and ensuring protection of the population from the harmful effects of ionizing radiation". Since then, four programs have been enacted. The first, the one approved in 2003, lasted from 2005 to 2014 and was worth 25.26 million hryvnias; however, it ended largely in failure as the Accounting Chamber of Ukraine found that none of the six environmental measures were completed, continuous radiation monitoring was not established, and during it radioactive waste was actually stolen from the site. The second program ranged from 2010 to 2014 and was approved in 2009 with an expenditure of 84.3 million hryvnias, although actual funding amounted to 28.7% of that amount. The Accounting Chamber later again found that the main goals of this program were not achieved and were not primarily used for the site.

The third program took place from 2015 to 2017, was approved in December 2015, and was worth 67.74 million hryvnias. Again, no practical rehabilitation started, and most of the funds were spent on debt repayment; a criminal case was opened against DP Barrier in 2018. The latest program was from 2019 to 2023 and was approved in August 2019 for the largest expenditure ever, 250 million hryvnias. Due to the project not funding DP Barrier's costs, it was said that by 2021 DP Barrier was $1.2 million in debt and was the defendant in 158 open legal cases due to unpaid wages. Yuriy Rets, the DP Barrier's director, said the company had given up waiting on funds and that any actions on the site have stopped since 2016 due to debt.

In 2000, the International Atomic Energy Agency has evaluated the condition of the sites and was considering dispatching a major observation and aid mission to Kamianske. Since then, there have been multiple international aid missions that have accumulated a total cost of $12 million. The first program was funded by Sweden's Swedish International Development Cooperation Agency (SIDA) entitled ENSURE-I, and it ran for a year from 2008 to 2009, and during this time it helped identify high-risk objects using models. In continuation of this was ENSURE-II from 2011 to 2013, which provided radiation safety guidance and did more thorough site assessments. The first comprehensive long-term rehabilitation strategy for the site was provided from the program EU INSC U4.01, funded by the European Union from 2014 to 2016. They put the total cost at approximately 250 million euros, which was approved by the Ministry of Energy of Ukraine, but there was no governmental response as of 2020. The most recent projects are EU INSC U4.02, which focused on urgent measures such as construction and removing contaminated objects alongside the DSA project which was funded by the Norwegian government in 2019 to focus on reducing risks at the site.

The most recent efforts happened in April 2024 when a number of members of the Verkhovna Rada met with the European Commission's Joint Support Office director, the head of the Kamianske Raion, and DP Barrier's director to discuss international funding and priority measures.

== See also ==
- Threat of the Dnieper reservoirs
- Wismut, which also had a uranium remediation project under the Wismut Act
