= Novoaltaysk =

Town in Altai Krai, Russia

Novoaltaysk Новоалтайск
- Town
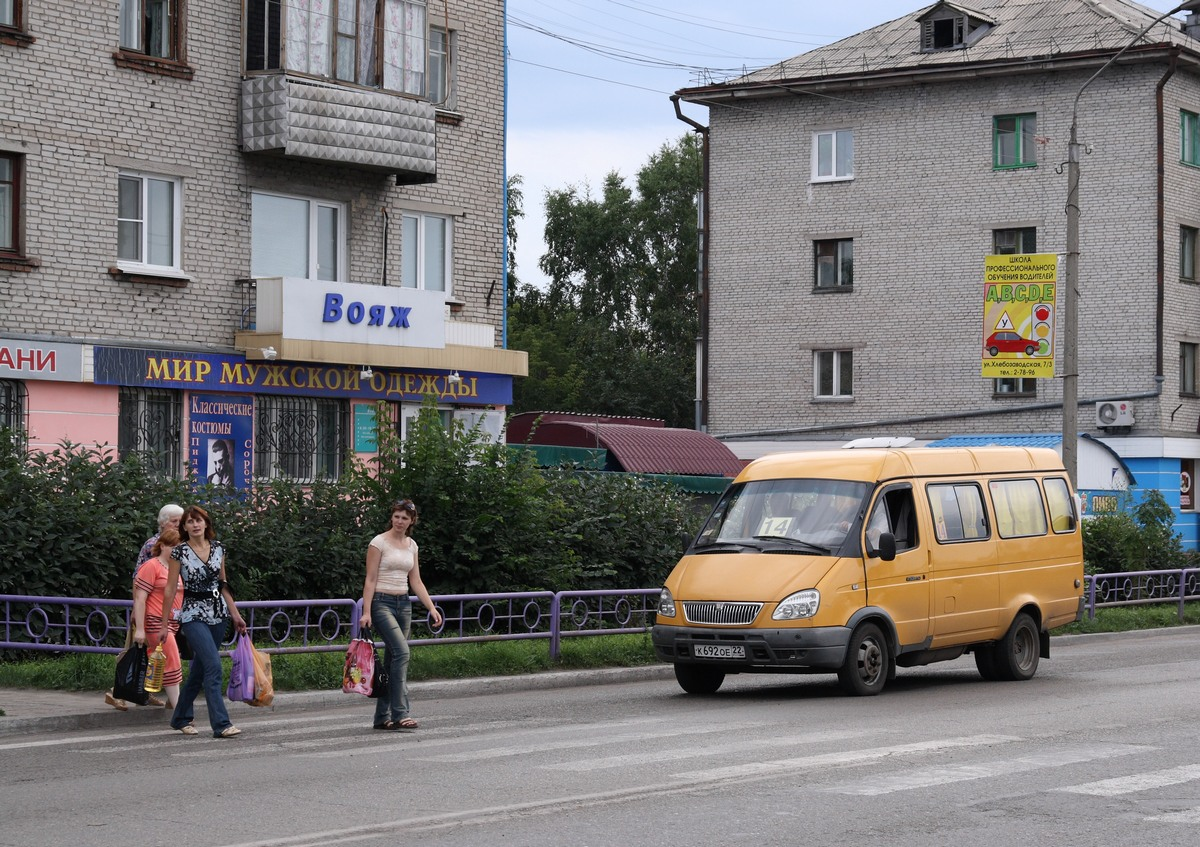

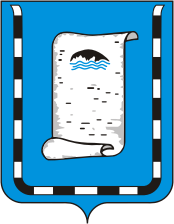
- Coat of arms
- Interactive map of Novoaltaysk
- Location of Novoaltaysk Novoaltaysk (Altai Krai)
- Coordinates: 53°23′N 83°56′E
- Country: Russia
- Federal subject: Altai Krai
- Founded: 1736
- Town status since: 1942

Government
  - Head: Sergey Mukhortov

Area
  - Total: 72.2 km^{2} (27.9 sq mi)
- Elevation: 140 m (460 ft)

Population (2010 Census)
  - Total: 70,437
  - Estimate (2025): 73,292 (+4.1%)
  - Rank: 225th in 2010
  - Density: 976/km^{2} (2,530/sq mi)

Administrative status
  - Subordinated to: town of krai significance of Novoaltaysk
  - Capital of: town of krai significance of Novoaltaysk, Pervomaysky District

Municipal status
  - Urban okrug: Novoaltaysk Urban Okrug
  - Capital of: Novoaltaysk Urban Okrug, Pervomaysky Municipal District
- Time zone: UTC+7 (MSK+4)
- Postal codes: 658080–658084, 658087, 658089–658091, 658095, 658099
- Dialing code: +7 38532
- OKTMO ID: 01713000001
- Website: www.novoaltaysk.ru

Novoaltaysk (Russian: Новоалта́йск) is a town in Altai Krai, Russia, located on the right bank of the Ob River, in the lower reaches of its right tributary the Chesnokovka, 12 kilometers (7.5 mi) across from Barnaul, the administrative center of the krai. Population: 70,437 (2010 census); 60,015 (2002 census); 53,642 (1989 Soviet census); 51,000 (1974); 9,000 (1939).

== History ==
It was founded in 1736 as the village of Chesnokovka (Чесноковка). In 1934, a sawmill was built. In 1941, during the Great Patriotic War, Dniprodzerzhynsk Carriage Works was evacuated here from Dniprodzerzhynsk, on the Eastern Front in the Ukrainian Soviet Socialist Republic. In 1942, Chesnokovka was granted town status and in 1962 it was given its present name.

== Administrative and municipal status ==
Within the framework of administrative divisions, Novoaltaysk serves as the administrative center of Pervomaysky District, even though it is not a part of it. As an administrative division, it is incorporated separately as the town of krai significance of Novoaltaysk—an administrative unit with the status equal to that of the districts. As a municipal division, the town of krai significance of Novoaltaysk is incorporated as Novoaltaysk Urban Okrug.

== Transportation ==
Novoaltaysk is a major transportation hub and home to one of the ten largest railway station units in Russia. The town is located at the intersection of railways and highways of federal importance.

== Industry ==
Altaivagon is the town's largest industrial object. It is what became of the Dniprodzerzhynsk Carriage Works. However in recent years it has seen something of a downturn.

== Notable people ==
- Stepan Akelkin (born 1985), former Russian professional footballer
