= Pervomaysky District, Altai Krai =

Pervomaysky District Первомайский район (Russian)
- District
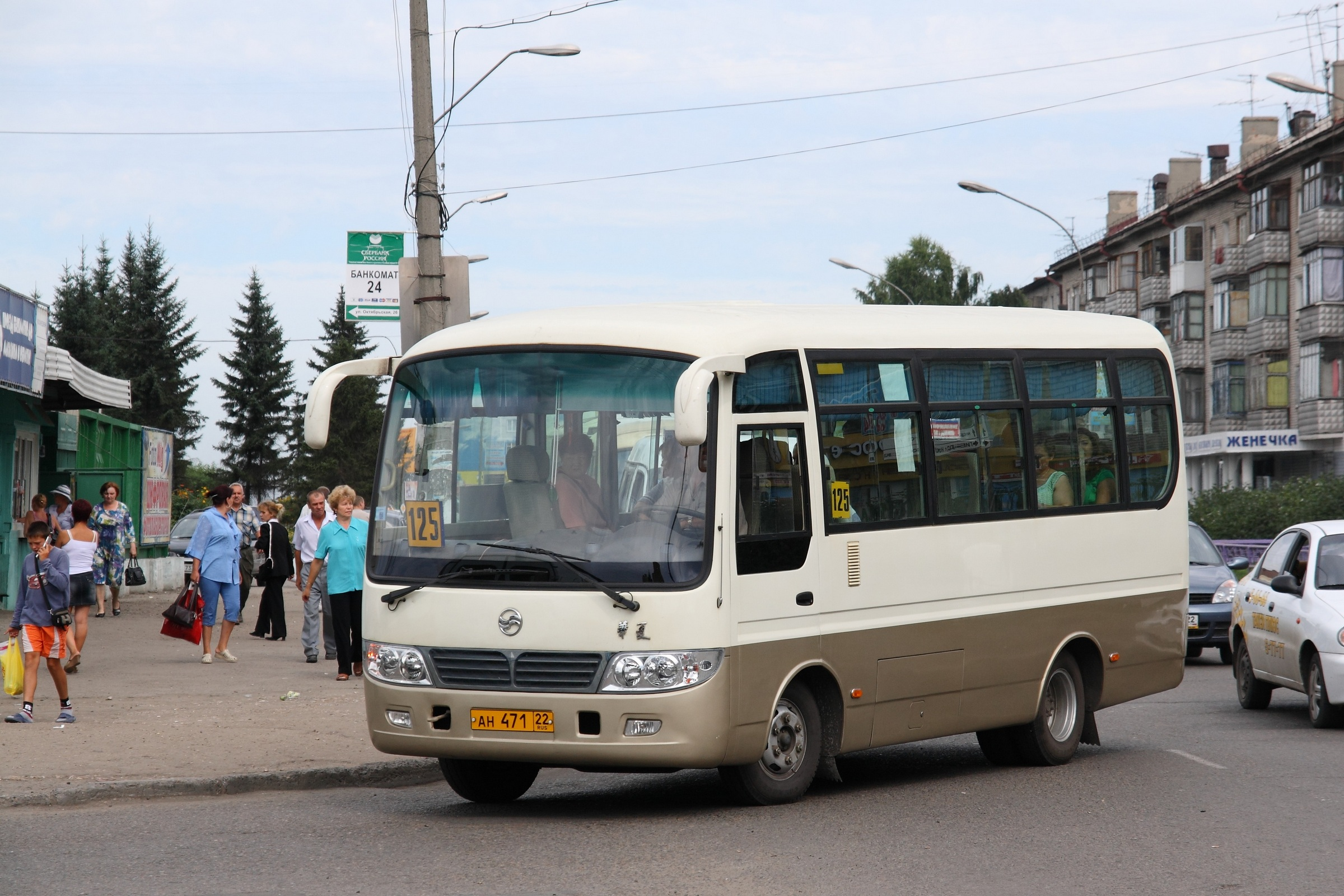
- Minibus in Novoaltaysk, Pervomaysky District

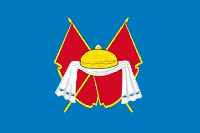
- Flag Coat of arms
- Location of Pervomaysky District in Altai Krai
- Coordinates: 53°24′N 83°56′E
- Country: Russia
- Federal subject: Altai Krai
- Established: 1935
- Administrative center: Novoaltaysk

Area
  - Total: 3,616 km^{2} (1,396 sq mi)

Population (2010 Census)
  - Total: 50,100
  - Density: 13.9/km^{2} (35.9/sq mi)
  - Urban: 0%
  - Rural: 100%

Administrative structure
  - Administrative divisions: 18 selsoviet
  - Inhabited localities: 53 rural localities

Municipal structure
  - Municipally incorporated as: Pervomaysky Municipal District
  - Municipal divisions: 0 urban settlements, 18 rural settlements
- Time zone: UTC+7 (MSK+4)
- OKTMO ID: 01632000
- Website: http://www.perv-alt.ru/

Pervomaysky District (Russian: Первома́йский райо́н) is an administrative and municipal district (raion), one of the fifty-nine in Altai Krai, Russia. It is located in the northeast of the krai. The area of the district is 3,616 square kilometers (1,396 sq mi). Its administrative center is the town of Novoaltaysk (which is not administratively a part of the district). Population: 50,100 (2010 census); 47,467 (2002 census); 45,484 (1989 Soviet census).

== Administrative and municipal status ==
Within the framework of administrative divisions, Pervomaysky District is one of the fifty-nine in the krai. The town of Novoaltaysk serves as its administrative center, despite being incorporated separately as a town of krai significance—an administrative unit with the status equal to that of the districts.

As a municipal division, the district is incorporated as Pervomaysky Municipal District. The town of krai significance of Novoaltaysk is incorporated separately from the district as Novoaltaysk Urban Okrug.
