= Nu Virgos discography =

- Studio albums: 5
- Compilation albums: 6
- Singles: 27
- Video albums: 4
- Music videos: 40

This article lists the discography of Russian-Ukrainian girl group Nu Virgos, known in Ukraine and other Russian-speaking countries as VIA Gra (Ukrainian: ВІА Гра; Russian: ВИА Гра).

== Albums ==
=== Studio albums ===
List of studio albums, with selected chart positions, sales figures and certifications
Title	Album details	Peak charts positions		Sales	Certifications
Title	Album details	FIN	RUS (Note: Positions refer to the monthly albums' ranking published by the National Federation of Phonograph Producers (NFPF): Popytka No. 5, Stop! Snyato!, and Biologiya.)	Sales	Certifications
Russian
Popytka No. 5 (Попытка № 5) (Attempt #5)	Released: September 27, 2001; Re-released: June, 2002; Labels: Columbia, Sony Music Russia; Formats: CD, cassette, digital download	—	1	RUS: 300,000	RUS: Gold
Stop! Snyato! (Стоп! Снято!) (Stop! Cut!)	Released: April 14, 2003; Labels: Columbia, Sony Music Russia; Formats: CD, cassette, digital download	—	3		RUS: Gold
Biologiya (Биология) (Biology)	Released: 12 November 2003; Labels: Columbia, Sony Music Russia; Formats: CD, CD+DVD, cassette, digital download	—	1		RUS: Platinum
English
Stop! Stop! Stop!	Released: 2 July 2003 (JPN); Labels: Columbia, Sony Music Japan; Formats: CD, CD+VCD, cassette	23	—	JPN: 29,000	
L.M.L.	Released: September 13, 2007; Label: Monolit; Formats: CD, cassette	—	—		
"—" denotes items which were not released in that country or failed to chart.

=== Compilation albums ===
List of compilation albums
Title	Album details
Brillianty (Бриллианты)	Released: December 12, 2005; Label: CD Land; Formats: CD, cassette, digital download
MP3 Collection	Released: 2006; Label: CD Land; Formats: CD, digital download
Potselui (Поцелуи)	Released: November 1, 2007; Label: Monolit; Formats: CD, cassette, digital download
Emansipatsiya (Эмансипация)	Released: October 30, 2008; Label: Amusic; Formats: CD, CD+DVD
Luchshiye pesni (Лучшие песни)	Released: 2008; Label: Monolit; Formats: CD
Vsё luchsheye v odnom (Всё лучшее в одном)	Released: July 24, 2015; Label: Pervoye muzykal’noye Izdatel’stvo; Formats: digital download

=== Video albums ===
List of video albums
Title	Album details
Bomba (Вомба)	Released: October 6, 2003; Label: Sony Music Russia; Formats: VHS
Stop! Snyato! (Стоп! Снято!)	Released: November 10, 2003; Label: Sony Music Russia; Formats: DVD
MC Collection	Released: 2004; Label: Columbia; Formats: VCD
Video Brillianty (Video Бриллианты)	Released: 2006; Label: CD Land; Formats: DVD

== Singles ==
=== As lead artist ===
List of singles as lead artist, with selected chart positions, showing year released and album name
Title	Year	Peak chart positions						Album
Title	Year	CIS countries (Note: Peak positions for selected singles before and since 2013. Peak positions for the following singles available: "Okean i tri reki", "Prityazhen'ya bol'she net", and "Emancipation".)	FIN	NOR	RUS		UKR	Album
Title	Year	CIS countries	FIN	NOR	Tophit	Lenta.ru (Note: Peak positions from the weekly digital chart published by Russian newspaper Lenta.ru based on sales from the iTunes Store. The songs that charted are: "Allo, mam!", "Peremiriye", "U menya poyavilsya drugoy", "Kislorod", and "Tak sil'no".)	UKR	Album
Russian
"Stop! Stop! Stop!" ("Стоп! Стоп! Стоп!")	2002	—	—	—	—	—	—	Stop! Snyato!
"Good Morning, Papa!" ("Good morning, папа!")	2002	—	—	—	—	—	—	Stop! Snyato!
"Ne ostavlyay menya, lyubimyy!" ("Не оставляй меня, любимый!")	2003	—	—	—	—	—	—	Stop! Snyato!
"Vot taki dela" ("Вот таки дела")	2003	62	—	—	—	—	—	Biologiya
"Okean i tri reki" ("Океан и три реки") (with Valeriy Meladze)	2003	1	—	—	—	—	—	Biologiya
"Ne nado" ("Не надо")	2004	13	—	—	—	—	—	Biologiya
"Prityazhen'ya bol'she net" ("Притяженья больше нет") (with Valeriy Meladze)	2004	1	—	—	—	—	—	Brillianty
"Mir, o kotorom ya ne znala do tebya" ("Мир, о котором я не знала до тебя")	2004	6	—	—	—	—	—	Brillianty
"Brillanty" ("Бриллианты")	2005	10	—	—	—	—	—	Brillianty
"Obmani, no ostan'sya" ("Обмани, но останься")	2006	4	—	—	—	—	—	Potselui
"L.M.L." ("Л.М.Л.")	2006	7	—	—	—	—	—	Potselui
"Bomba" ("Бомба") (2006 version)	2006	75	—	—	—	—	—	Emansipatsiya
"Tsvetok i nozh" ("Цветок и нож")	2006	2	—	—	—	—	—	Potselui
"Potselui" ("Поцелуи")	2007	1	—	—	—	—	—	Potselui
"Ya ne boyus'" ("Я не боюсь")	2008	60	—	—	—	—	—	Emansipatsiya
"Emancipation"	2008	36	—	—	—	—	—	Emansipatsiya
"Аnti-geysha" ("Анти-гейша")	2009	6	—	—	—	—	—	Non-album singles
"Sumasshedshiy" ("Сумасшедший")	2009	20	—	—	—	—	—	Non-album singles
"Poshёl von" ("Пошёл вон")	2010	39	—	—	—	—	—	Non-album singles
"Den' bez tebya" ("День без тебя")	2010	25	—	—	—	—	12	Non-album singles
"Allo, mam!" ("Алло, мам!")	2012	50	—	—	—	5	2	Non-album singles
"Peremiriye" ("Перемирие")	2013	6	—	—	12	2	1	Non-album singles
"U menya poyavilsya drugoy" ("У меня появился другой") (featuring Vakhtang)	2014	9	—	—	14	4	1	Non-album singles
"Eto bylo prekrasno" ("Это было прекрасно")	2015	134	—	—	341	—	43	Non-album singles
"Tak sil'no" ("Так сильно")	2015	10	—	—	15	8	11	Non-album singles
English
"Stop! Stop! Stop!"	2003	—	6	20	—	—	—	Stop! Stop! Stop!
"—" denotes items which were not released in that country or failed to chart.

=== As a featured artist ===
List of singles as featured artist, with selected chart positions, showing year released
Title	Year	Peak chart positions				Album
Title	Year	CIS countries	RUS		UKR	Album
Title	Year	CIS countries	Tophit	Lenta.ru	UKR	Album
Russian
"Kislorod" ("Кислород") (Mot featuring VIA Gra)	2014	22	23	2	61	Non-album single

=== Promotional singles ===
List of promotional singles, showing year released and album name
Title	Year	Album
English and Japanese
"Kill My Girlfriend (Ai no Wana)" (Note: Promotional single released in Japan featuring the songs "Kill My Girlfriend" and its Japanese version titled "Ai no Wana", as well as the original Russian song "Ubey moyu podrugu".) (Kill My Girlfriend～愛の罠～)	2003	Stop! Stop! Stop!

== Music videos ==
List of music videos, showing year released and directors
Title	Year	Other artist(s)	Director(s)
As lead artist
Russian
"Popytka No. 5" ("Попытка № 5")	2000	None	Maksym Papernyk
"Obnimi menya" ("Обними меня")	2000	None	Semen Horov
"Bomba" ("Бомба")	2001	None	Ihor Ivanov
"Ya ne vernus" ("Я не вернусь")	2001	None	Maksym Papernyk
"Poyavis, moy suzhenyy" ("Появись, мой суженый")	2001	Ani Lorak	Semen Horov
"Stop! Stop! Stop!" ("Стоп! Стоп! Стоп!")	2002	None	Semen Horov
"Good Morning, papa!" ("Good Morning, папа!")	2002	None	Semen Horov
"Ya ne ponyala" ("Я не поняла")	2002	Verka Serduchka	Semen Horov
"Ne ostavlyay menya, lyubimyy!" ("Не оставляй меня, любимый!")	2003	None	Semen Horov
"Ubey moyu podrugu" ("Убей мою подругу")	2003	None	Semen Horov
"Okean i tri reki" ("Океан и три реки")	2003	Valeriy Meladze	Semen Horov
"Stop! Stop! Stop!"	2003	None	Semen Horov
"Prityazhen'ya bol'she net" ("Притяженья больше нет")	2003	Valeriy Meladze	Semen Horov
"Biologiya" ("Биология")	2004	None	Semen Horov
"Oy hovoryla chysta voda" ("Ой говорила чиста вода")	2004	None	Semen Horov
"Mir, o kotorom ya ne znala do tebya" ("Мир, о котором я не знала до тебя")	2004	None	Semen Horov
"Net nichego khuzhe" ("Нет ничего хуже")	2005	None	Semen Horov
"Brillianty" ("Бриллианты")	2005	None	Semen Horov
"Obmani, no ostan'sya" ("Обмани, но останься")	2006	None	Semen Horov
"L.M.L." ("Л.М.Л.")	2006	None	Alan Badoyev
"Tsvetok i nozh" ("Цветок и нож")	2006	None	Alan Badoyev
"Potselui" ("Поцелуи")	2007	None	Alan Badoyev
"Ya ne boyus" ("Я не боюсь")	2008	None	Alan Badoyev
"My emancipation"	2008	None	Alan Badoyev
"Amerikanskaya zhena" ("Аmerikanskaya zhena")	2008	Roman Vasyanov	
"Аnti-geysha" ("Анти-гейша")	2009	Alan Badoev	
"Sumasshedshiy" ("Сумасшедший")	2009	Sergey Solodkiy	
"Poshёl von" ("Пошёл вон")	2010	Alan Badoev	
"Den' bez tebya" ("День без тебя")	2010	Sergey Solodkiy	
"Allo, mam!" ("Алло, мам!")	2012	Alan Badoev	
"Peremiriye" ("Перемирие")	2013		
"U menya poyavilsya drugoy" ("У меня появился другой")	2014	Vakhtang	
"Eto bylo prekrasno" ("Это было прекрасно")	2015	None	Sergey Solodkiy
"Tak sil'no" ("Так сильно")	2015	None	Sergey Solodkiy
As lead artist
English
"Stop! Stop! Stop!"	2003	None	Semyon Gorov
"Kill My Girlfriend"	2003	None	
"Till the Morning Light"	2004	None	
"Don't Ever Leave Me Love"	2004	None	
"Take You Back"	2007	None	Semyon Gorov
"I Don't Want a Man"	2007	ТНМК	Semyon Gorov
"L.M.L."	2007	None	Semyon Gorov
As a featured artist
Russian
"Kislorod" ("Кислород")	2014	Mot	
