= Glukoza =

Russian singer (born 1986)

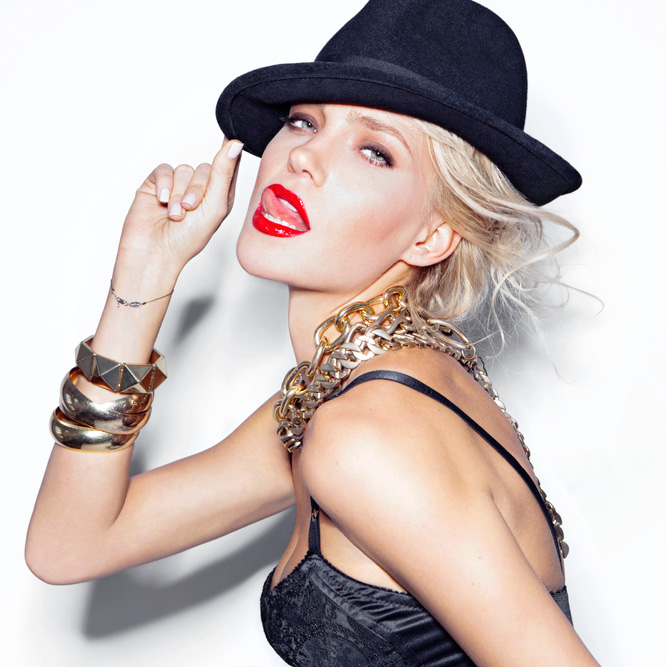
- Glukoza in 2011
- Born: Natalya Ilynichna Ionova; 7 June 1986 (age 40); Moscow, Russian SFSR, Soviet Union
- Other name: Natalya Ilynichna Chistyakova-Ionova
- Occupations: Singer; actress; TV presenter
- Years active: 1996–present
- Spouse: Aleksandr Chistyakov (m. 2006)
- Children: 2, including ray! a.k.a. Lidus
- Awards: MTV Europe Music Award for Best Russian Act
- Musical career
- Origin: Moscow, Russia
- Genres: Pop; new wave; alternative pop; ska; pop rock; synthpop; dance-pop
- Instrument: Vocals
- Years active: 2002–present
- Labels: Monolit; Glukoza
- Formerly of: Gluk'oza
- Website: glukoza.com

Gluk'oza
- Origin: Moscow, Russia
- Genres: Pop; new wave; alternative pop; ska; pop rock; synthpop; dance-pop
- Years active: 2002–2006
- Label: Monolit
- Past members: Natalya "Glukoza" Ionova; Artyom Semenkovich; Denis Viskunov; Kirill Savichev; Vladimir "Kitten" Gorovenko; Anton Lymaryov
- Website: glukoza.com

Natalya Ilynichna Chistyakova-Ionova (Russian: Наталья Ильинична Чистякова-Ионова; born 7 June 1986), better known by her stage name Glukoza (Глюкоза, pronounced [ɡlʲʊˈkozə], lit. 'glucose') (Note: before 2024 also was stylized as Gluk'oza, Глюк'oza) is a Russian singer, actress and TV presenter.

Gluk'oza was also the name of the pop group whose lead singer was Natalya Ionova in 2002–2006, and Maxim Fadeev's pen name (in 2001–2003).

Her famous songs include Невеста ('the bride') and Снег идет ('snow is falling').

== Biography ==
Ionova was born in Moscow, Soviet Union. Some sources call her birthplace Syzran, Kuibyshev Oblast, Russian SFSR but according to Ionova herself and her PR-manager, this is a myth that was part of the PR-company.

As a child, her hobbies included ballet and chess. She also did some acting and was in the films Triumph and Princess's War, as well as a few episodes of Yeralash. Currently she has a passion for aviation, her two Dobermans, and her yellow Mini Cooper, which she enjoys driving. She describes her favorite musical artists as Madonna, Moby, Mumiy Troll and Agatha Christie.

=== Music career ===
In December 2005 she recorded and released an English version of her popular song "Schweine" that never took off with the public.

After her pregnancy leave, she released another single called "Dengi" (Money). During the festival, "New Wave" she sang a duet with Maxim Fadeev "Sicily". In May 2010 she released new single "Vot Takaya Lubov'", video.

In 2011, Glukoza competed on the Russian version of the television show Fort Boyard.

== Personal life ==
On 17 June 2006 she married Aleksandr Chistyakov, manager of the power supply systems of Russia. The couple has two daughters. Glukoza lives in Moscow, Russia, with her family.

In August 2020, Glukoza was banned from entering Ukraine for three years because of her visit to the Crimean peninsula, which is currently disputed by Russia and Ukraine.

== Discography ==
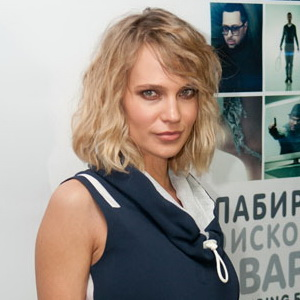
Singer Glukoza at a strip-club presentation of the clip of the band, "Labyrinth." 2012.

=== Studio albums ===
- 2003: Glukoza Nostra (Глюк'oza Nostra)
- 2005: Moskva (Москва; Moscow)
- 2011: Trans-Forma (Транс-Форма; Trans-Form)
- 2025: Harmony
- 2025: Echoes

=== Compilation albums ===
- 2008: Luchshye Pesni (Лучшие песни; Best songs)

=== Singles ===
Year	Title	Formats	Album
2002	"Shuga" ("Shuga" or "Shoo")	Airplay	Glukoza Nostra
2002	"Nenavizhu" ("I Hate")	Airplay, music video	Glukoza Nostra
2003	"Nevesta" ("Bride")	CD, airplay, music video	Glukoza Nostra
2003	"Malysh" ("Babe")	Airplay	Glukoza Nostra
2003	"Glukoza Nostra"	Airplay, music video	Glukoza Nostra
2004	"Karina"	Airplay	Moskva
2004	"Zhenikha Khotela" ("Wanted The Groom") (feat. Verka Serduchka)	Airplay	Zhenikha Khotela. Neizdannoe (Verka Serduchka's album)
2004	"Oy-Oy" ("Oh-Oh")	Airplay, music video	Moskva
2004	"Sneg Idyot" ("It's Snowing")	Airplay, music video	Moskva
2005	"Schweine" ("Pigs")	Airplay, music video	Moskva
2005	"Yura"	Airplay	Moskva
2005	"Moskva" ("Moscow")	Airplay, music video	Moskva
2005	"Schweine (Eins, Zwei, Drei...)" ("Pigs (One, Two, Three...)")	CD, digital download	Trans-Forma
2006	"Svadba" ("Wedding")	Airplay, music video	Luchshye Pesni
2006	"Sashok"	Airplay	Non-album single
2007	"Babochki" ("Butterflies")	Airplay, music video	Trans-Forma
2008	"Tantsuy, Rossiya!!!" ("Dance, Russia!!!")	Airplay, music video	Trans-Forma
2008	"Sitsiliya" ("Sicily") (feat. Maxim Fadeev)	Airplay	Non-album single
2008	"Dochka" ("Daughter")	Airplay, music video	Trans-Forma
2009	"Dengi" ("Money")	Airplay, music video	Non-album single
2010	"Vot Takaya Lyubov" ("What A Love")	Airplay, music video	Trans-Forma
2010	"Kak V Detstve" ("Like It Was in My Childhood")	Airplay, music video	Trans-Forma
2011	"High Sign"	Digital download, music video	Trans-Forma
2011	"Vzmah" ("Wave")	Digital download, airplay, music video	Trans-Forma
2011	"Hochu Muzhchinu" ("I Want A Man")	Airplay, music video	Trans-Forma
2011	"Sledy Slyoz" ("Traces of Tears")	Airplay, music video	Trans-Forma
2011	"Moy Porok" ("My Vice")	Airplay, music video	Trans-Forma
2012	"Ko$ka" ("Cat")	Airplay, music video	Non-album singles
2012	"Vozmi Menya za Ruku" ("Take My Hand")	Digital download, airplay, music video	Non-album singles
2013	"Babochki" ("Butterflies") (feat. Smoky Mo)	Airplay, music video	Mladshiy (Smoky Mo's album)
2013	"Khochesh Sdelat Mne Bolno?" ("Want You Hurt Me?")	Digital download, airplay, music video	Non-album singles
2014	"Zachem" ("Why")	Digital download, airplay, music video	Non-album singles
2015	"Poy Mne, Veter" ("Sing for Me, Wind")	Digital download, airplay, music video	Non-album singles
2015	"Sogrey" ("Warm Me Up")	Digital download, music video	Non-album singles
2016	"Ya Budu Taynoyu" ("I Will Mystery")	Digital download, airplay, music video	Non-album singles
2016	"Bez Tebya" ("Without You")	Digital download, music video	Non-album singles
2017	"Pakhnu Lish Toboy" ("I Only Smell Like You") (feat. Artik & Asti)	Digital download, airplay, music video	Non-album singles
2017	"Luna-Luna" ("Moon, Moon") (Sofia Rotaru cover)	Digital download	Non-album singles
2017	"Tayu" ("I'm Melting")	Digital download, airplay, music video	Non-album singles
2017	"Tayu (Dance Remix)"	Digital download, airplay, music video	Non-album singles
2018	"Zhu-Zhu" (feat. Leningrad & ST)	Digital download, airplay, music video	Non-album singles
2018	"Zhu-Zhu (Family Edit)" (feat. Leningrad & ST)	Digital download, airplay, music video	Non-album singles
2018	"Feng Shui"	Digital download, airplay, music video	Non-album singles
2019	"Uletay" ("Fly Away") (feat. Natan)	Digital download, airplay	Non-album singles
2019	"Tantsevach" ("Dancer")	Digital download, airplay, music video	Non-album singles
2020	"Zanoza" ("Splinter")	Digital download, airplay, music video	Non-album singles
2020	"Murashki" ("Goosebumps")	Digital download, airplay, music video	Non-album singles
2020	"Fun"	Digital download, music video	Non-album singles
2021	"Tretye Koltso" ("Third Ring") (feat. Subo)	Digital download, airplay	Non-album singles
2021	"Motylki" ("Moths") (feat. Kyivstoner)	Digital download, airplay, music video	Non-album singles
2021	"Pina Colada" ("Piña colada")	Digital download, airplay	Non-album singles
2021	"Ruki-Byodra" ("Arms, Hips")	Digital download, airplay, music video	Non-album singles
2022	"Ebobo (Inspired by Little Big)"	Digital download, airplay, music video	Non-album singles
2022	"Da-Di-Dam" (Kristina Orbakaitė cover)	Digital download, airplay, music video	Non-album singles
2022	"Party Exotica"	Digital download, music video	Non-album singles
2022	"Shiza" ("Craziness")	Digital download, airplay	Non-album singles
2022	"Antistress"	Digital download, airplay, music video	Non-album singles
2023	"Davay Zhenitstsa" ("Let's Get Married")	Digital download, airplay	Non-album singles
2023	"Spam"	Digital download, airplay	Non-album singles
2023	"Vzlom" ("Hack") (feat. Toxi$)	Digital download	Non-album singles
2024	"Me" (feat. Legroni)	Digital download	Non-album singles
2024	"Hooliganka" ("Hooligan Girl") (Lyubov Uspenskaya cover)	Digital download, airplay	Non-album singles
2024	"Prosecco"	Digital download, airplay	Non-album singles
2024	"Veter" ("Wind")	Digital download	Non-album singles
2024	"Snake"	Digital download	Non-album singles
2024	"Aura"	Digital download	Harmony
2025	"Frost"	Digital download, music video	Harmony
2025	"100"	Digital download	Echoes
2025	"Ebobo (Gnaar & АААрхитектор Remix)"	Digital download	Non-album singles
2026	"Gluvanchy"	Digital download	Non-album singles
2026	"Zhu-Zhu (Agatka Iskra Remix)"	Digital download	Non-album singles
2026	"Krichu" ("I Shout") (feat. Sir Soylok)	Digital download	Non-album singles

== Filmography ==
=== Feature films ===
Year	Title	Role
2000	Triumph: The Red One (directed by Oleg Pogodin)	Tina
2007	Rud and Sam (directed by Grigor Gyardushian)	Masha
2013	Princess's War (Triumph original version; directed by Vladimir Alenikov)	Tina
2017	Naughty Grandma (directed by Maryus Vaysberg)	Lyuba
2019	Naughty Grandma 2 (directed by Maryus Vaysberg)	Lyuba
2019	Heat	Cameo
2021	Naughty Great-Grandma Begins (directed by Maryus Vaysberg)	Vika
2022	Lovers (directed by Elena Khazanova)	Vera
2022	My Bad Sister (directed by Aleksandr Galibin)	Yulya
2023	My Bad Sister 2 (directed by Aleksandr Galibin)	Yulya
2024	Catch the Dog If You Can (directed by Anna Kurbatova)	Alina Kolechkina

=== Television and web series ===
Year	Title	Role	Ref.
1996–2000	Yeralash	Various roles in 5 episodes	
2003	Look Out! Modern! 2004 (directed by Andrey Balashov & Anna Parmas)	Natalie	
2004	Night in the Disco Style (directed by Felix Mikhailov & Egor Druzhinin)	Cameo	
2005	Night in the Style of Childhood (directed by Felix Mikhailov & Egor Druzhinin)	Cameo	
2006	Fast Train #1 (directed by Oleg Gusev)	Marilyn Monroe	
2007	The Phantom of the Soap Opera	Cameo	
2017	Voronin's Family	Cameo in season 20	
2021	Musicians' Nightmares	Manager of the group Boy Is Dead in episode "Boy Is Dead"	
2022	Pirogova Sole Tradership	Cameo in season 5	

=== Voice acting ===
Year	Title	Role
2009	Monsters vs. Aliens (directed by Conrad Vernon & Rob Letterman)	Susan Murphy / Ginormica
2015	A Warrior's Tail (directed by Maxim Fadeev)	Puffy (Pusik)

=== Music video appearances ===
Year	Artist	Title
2001	Maxim Fadeev	"Leti Za Mnoy" ("Fly After Me")
2001	7B	"Molodye Vetra" ("Young Winds")
2002	Yuri Shatunov	"Detstvo" ("Childhood")
2014	Bi-2	"Hipster"
2018	Pharaoh	"Lallipap"
2021	Klava Koka	"La La La"
