= Stop! Stop! Stop! (album) =

Studio album by Nu Virgos
- Released: 18 September 2003
- Recorded: 2003
- Genres: Dance-pop; pop rock; teen pop; urban pop
- Languages: English; Japanese; Russian
- Label: Sony Music Japan
- Producers: Konstantin Meladze; Dmytro Kostyuk

Nu Virgos chronology
| Biologiya (2003) | Stop! Stop! Stop! (2003) | Brillianty (2005) |

Stop! Stop! Stop! is the first English-language and fourth overall studio album by the Ukrainian girl group Nu Virgos. The album was the band's first record to be released in Japan, where it was sold under their Ukrainian name V.I.A. "Gra" (バイアグラ, Baiagura). The Japanese market edition was released in 2003 by Sony Music Japan with the title Stop! Stop! ~Love's Trap~ (ストップ!ストップ!～愛の罠～, Sutoppu! Sutoppu! ~Ainowana~).

== Track listing ==
All tracks are written by Konstantin Meladze; Alexey Kruzin contributed English translations and Jun Shiobuki contributed the Japanese translation.

Standard edition
| No. | Title | Original song | Length |
|---|---|---|---|
| 1. | "Stop! Stop! Stop!" | "Stop! Stop! Stop!" (from Stop! Snyato!, 2003) | 3:48 |
| 2. | "Till The Morning Light" | "Ya ne ponyala" (from Stop! Snyato!) | 3:35 |
| 3. | "Hold Me Closer" | "Obnimi menya" (from Popytka No. 5, 2001) | 3:47 |
| 4. | "Good Morning, Daddy!" | "Good morning, papa!" (from Stop! Snyato!) | 3:33 |
| 5. | "Let Me Introduce My Mama" | "Poznakomsya s moey mamoy" (from Popytka No. 5) | 4:06 |
| 6. | "Kill My Girlfriend" | "Ubey moyu podrugu" (from Stop! Snyato!) | 3:39 |
| 7. | "Don't Ever Leave Me Love" | "Ne ostavlyay menya, lyubimyy!" (from Stop! Snyato!) | 3:31 |
| 8. | "Where I'm Gonna Find My Love" | "Poyavis', moy suzhenyy" (from the Evenings on a Farm Near Dikanka soundtrack, 2001) | 3:30 |
| 9. | "Thank You for the Summer" | "Spasibo za leto" (from Popytka No. 5) | 3:10 |
| 10. | "Every Day" | "Kazhdyy den'" (from Popytka No. 5) | 3:02 |
| 11. | "Stop! Stop! Stop!" (upbeat version) | "Stop! Stop! Stop!" (upbeat version) (from Biologiya, 2003) | 3:47 |

Digital edition bonus track
| No. | Title | Original song | Length |
|---|---|---|---|
| 12. | "Ai No Wana" (Japanese: 愛の罠, lit. 'Love trap') | "Ubey moyu podrugu" (from Stop! Snyato!) | 3:38 |
| Total length: | | | 43:24 |

Japanese edition
| No. | Title | Length |
|---|---|---|
| 4. | "Kill My Girlfriend" | 3:39 |
| 5. | "Don't Ever Leave Me Love" | 3:31 |
| 6. | "Where I'm Gonna Find My Love" | 3:30 |
| 7. | "Good Morning, Daddy!" | 3:33 |
| 8. | "Thank You for the Summer" | 3:10 |
| 9. | "Stop! Stop! Stop!" (Стоп! Стоп! Стоп!; original Russian version) | 3:43 |
| 10. | "Vot taki dela" (Вот таки дела; alternate Russian version of "Ya ne ponyala"; from Biologiya) | 3:38 |
| 11. | "Ne ostavlyay menya, lyubimyy!" (Не оставляй меня, любимый!; original Russian version) | 3:31 |
| 12. | "Ubey moyu podrugu" (Убей мою подругу; original Russian version) | 3:43 |
| 13. | "Good morning, papa!" (Good morning, папа!; original Russian version) | 3:35 |
| 14. | "Ai No Wana" (愛の罠) | 3:38 |
| 15. | "Hold Me Closer" (remix) | 3:48 |

== Vocals ==
- Anna Sedokova
- Nadezhda Granovskaya
- Vera Brezhneva

== Release history ==
| Region | Release date |
|---|---|
| Japan | 14 April 2003 |
| Europe | March 2004 |
