= Anastasia Zadorozhnaya =

Russian actress (born 1985)

- Анастасия Задорожная
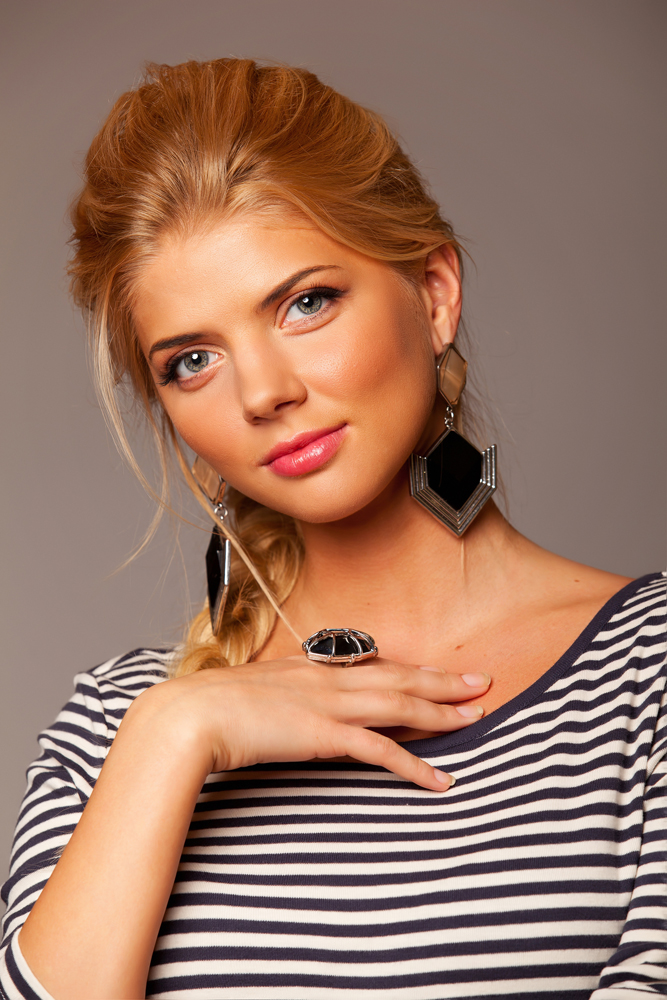
- Born: Anastasia Sergeyevna Zadorozhnaya; 30 August 1985 (age 40); Fedotovo, Vologda Oblast, RSFSR, USSR
- Occupations: actress; singer; TV presenter; model
- Years active: 1996–present
- Height: 5 ft 8 in (173 cm)
- Website: stasya.ru

Anastasia Sergeyevna Zadorozhnaya (Russian: Анастаси́я Серге́евна Задоро́жная; born August 30, 1985) is a Russian film actress, singer, TV presenter and fashion model. She is dubbed as the Russian Britney Spears.

== Biography ==
Anastasia Zadorozhnaya was born in Fedotovo, Vologda Oblast, Russian SFSR, Soviet Union (now Russia). In family of a serviceman.

In 1996 she became a soloist of the children's musical group Neposedy.

In 2001 she won the first role in series Simple Truths, where she got the role of schoolgirl Anzhelika Selivyorstova. In the summer of 2002, after graduation, she entered the acting department of GITIS. In the same year, on the set of the program 12 evil spectators Zadorozhnaya met her future producer Pyotr Sheksheyev. Professional cooperation Zadorozhnaya and Sheksheyev began only in 2003, when the first recordings of Nastya were made at the studio of Yuri Aizenshpis and the official website of the artist was launched. Then she starred in the video for the song Why Trample on My Love of the popular group Smyslovye Gallyutsinatsii.

In 2005 Zadorozhnaya was selected for the role of Vasilisa (Vasya), the main character of the youth series The Club that brought her all-Russian popularity. Nastya's partners in the set were Pyotr Fyodorov and Pavel Priluchny.

In 2007, the track I Will be placed on the 41st place in the Hot Adult Contemporary Tracks. In 2010 she was recognized as the sexiest actress of national cinema by the results of the TOP10SEXY Award.

In 2011, she was invited to the role of Cecile, a young heroine of the tragic fandom by Leonid Filatov, written on the motives of the novel by Pierre Choderlos de Laclos Dangerous Liaisons.

== Personal life ==
A few years met with figure skater Sergei Slavnov, then broke up with him.

== Selected filmography ==
Year	Title	Role	Notes
2006	Nobody Knows About Sex	Nika	
2009	Love in the Big City	Alisa Gromova	
2010	Love in the Big City 2	Alisa Gromova	
2006–2013	Happy Together	Olga	TV series
2014	Love in Vegas	Alisa Gromova	
2014	Kidnapping, Caucasian Style!	Nina	
2014	Love in Vegas	Alisa Gromova	
