= Natalia Bardo =

Russian actress (born 1988)

- Наталья Бардо
- Born: Natalia Sergeevna Krivozub; 5 April 1988 (age 37); Moscow, RSFSR, USSR
- Occupations: actress, model, singer, TV presenter
- Years active: 2006–present
- Website: Official website

Natalia Sergeevna Bardo, née Krivozub (Russian: Ната́лья Серге́евна Кривозуб; born 5 April 1988) is a Russian actress, singer and a TV host.

== Biography ==
Natalia Bardo was born in Moscow, Russian SFSR, Soviet Union. She used to live with her mother, who was an entrepreneur. Her father is a former athlete.

She attended art school, basketball, ballet and gymnastics as a child. At the age of 18 she was given her first role in "Pushkin: The Last Duel" feature film. She graduated from the Banking Institute college; entered and successfully completed her studies at the school of modeling and acting. She entered the Banking Institute afterwards.

In 2006, Natalia played a daughter of Evelena Bleodans's character Alina (“Cursed Heaven” series), which was released in January 2007.

In 2007, Natalia was invited to play in “Cursed Heaven 2”.

In June 2010, she changed her surname for “Bardo". She studied in The Boris Shchukin Theatre Institute.

== Personal life ==
She was married to businessman, Sergey Rusakov from January 2009 to 2012. In 2016, it became known about Natalia's relationship with the director Maryus Vaysberg. In 2018, the couple announced their wedding. They have a son named Eric (born May 31, 2016).

== Television ==
Natalia playing her role in “Made of Gold. Barvikha 2”, which was first released on “TNT” TV channel.

Her first lead role in a melodrama series was in "Veronica. Lost happiness” ("Russia " TV channel) in 2012, and a year later continued to work on the next season "Veronica. The Fugitive” (Beglyanka)

From January to July 2007, she took part in a TV project called "Dom-2".

One of her main projects is a comedy series called "Anzhelika" on the STS TV channel.

In 201,5 she hosted a TV show called "Mr. and Mrs. Media" on the Channel One Russia with Marat Basharov.

Natalia took part in a traditional fashion-calendar presentation of the Charity Fund "Russian Silhouette".

== Discography ==
In Autumn 2010, Natalia recorded the official cover version of the “Alejandro” hit by Lady Gaga in Russian. Gaga's producers chose Natalia's text from a dozen of translations.

In 2010, Natalia Bardo also recorded her single “Failure”, and a year later "I Want to Scream", "Bardo", "Day and Night", "Dreams of You", "Rain Drops", "6 Letters", and on April 7, 2011, presented her solo project in a dance-pop format. Songs from Natalya's future album and her cover version of "Alejandro" were first presented in this show.

=== Singles ===
- 2010
  - Alejandro
  - Oblom (Failure)
- 2011
  - I Want to Scream
  - Bardo
  - Day and Night
  - Dreams of You
  - Rain Drops
  - Six Letters

== Filmography ==
Year	Title	Role
2006	Pushkin: The Last Duel	Liza
2006	Cursed Heaven	Аlina
2008 — 2011	Wedding Ring (TV series)	Ul’yana and Olga
2008	Cursed Heaven 2	Аlina
2009	Moscow, I Love You!	TV reporter
2010	Yellow in the City	(hasn't been released)
2010	Stroybatya	Zhenya
2010	Stone	short movie
2010	Chasing the Shadow	Olga Nizova
2011	Vazhnyak	Maria
2011	Barvikha	Kristina Medler
2011	Surprise me	Lena
2012	White Moor and Intimate Details about My Neighbours	Desdemona
2012	Veronica, Lost Happiness	Veronica Serova
2012	Searching for Love in Russia	Katya
2012	Shapovalov	Alochka
2013	Second Chance	Vika
2013	Lie if You Love	Irina
2013	Immersion	Kristina
2013	Toy Seller	Sveta
2013	Because of You	Dasha Streltsova
2013	Veronica. The Fugitive	Veronica Serova
2013	Climbers	Natasha
2014	Anzhelika	Ul’yana Kamko
2014	A Year in Tuscany	Anya
2014	Look Back (Armenia)	Natali
2016	Friday	Friday fairy
2016	The Final frontier	Katya
2016	Love with Limitations	Tanya
2016	Scenario	Lika Vlazhkova
2016	Poteryashki (Lost Ones)	Vika Serebryakova
2017	Naughty Grandma	Victoria
2017	Darlings	Rita
2018	Wish Generator	short film
2018	Night Shift	Kristina
2018	Scenario (short film)	Lika Vlazhnova
2018	Flight Crew	Polina Ovechkina
2021	Survivors (TV series)	Lena
2021 — 2023	Girls with Makarov (TV series)	Valeria Krapivina

== Music video appearances ==
- Propaganda (Yolki-Palki)
- Maria Kozhevnikova and Vitaly Gogunsky (Who, If Not Us?)
- Vlad Sokolovsky (Target, directed by Alexey Golubev)

== Awards ==
1. Miss Charm of Russia 2009
2. Miss AutoLadyShow
3. International Prize "Women's Pride" winner.
4. "Woman of the World" holder
