= Love in the Big City (2009 film) =

2009 Russian-Ukrainian romantic comedy film by Marius Vaisbergas

- Directed by: Maryus Vaysberg
- Written by: Maryus Vaysberg
- Produced by: Sergei Livnev; Lev Nikolau; Georgiy Malkov
- Starring: Aleksey Chadov; Volodymyr Zelenskyy; Ville Haapasalo; Vera Brezhneva
- Cinematography: Irek Khartovich
- Production companies: LPLS Film Production; Leopolis; Living Films
- Distributed by: Karoprokat
- Release date: March 5, 2009
- Running time: 84 minutes
- Countries: Russia; Ukraine; United States
- Languages: Russian; English
- Budget: $3,5 million
- Box office: $9 119 668 $11,482,165 worldwide

Love in the Big City (Russian: «Любовь в большом городе», romanized: Lyubov v bolshom gorode) is a 2009 Russian-Ukrainian romantic comedy film directed by Maryus Vaysberg. It is based on the first full-length film project by Kvartal 95 Studio with the support of ICTV. This is the first film of a trilogy about the adventures of three friends in search of true love. It stars Aleksey Chadov, Volodymyr Zelenskyy, and Ville Haapasalo.

== Plot ==
The film is set in New York City, where three friends, Igor (Volodymyr Zelenskyy), Artem (Aleksey Chadov), and the "almost Russian" Finn Oleg (Ville Haapasalo), live indulgent lives while working in America. Igor works as a dentist, Oleg, nicknamed "Sauna," is a fitness instructor for a women’s club, and Artem, who is married but frequently unfaithful, is a tour guide for Russian tourists.

Their carefree existence is disrupted at a party when a mysterious man offers a toast to love, adding the cryptic line, "May what you drank for be impossible without what I drank for". Shortly after, all three friends find themselves unable to have sex. Desperate, they try everything to regain their virility, but nothing works. They eventually track down the man from the party, who reveals himself to be Saint Valentine (Philipp Kirkorov), living in America to help people find true love. Using his powers, he has "cursed" the friends to prevent promiscuity; only genuine love can lift the spell, allowing intimacy with a beloved woman. Igor, Artem, and Oleg must each go on a journey to discover that true love is the most important thing in life.

== Cast ==
- Aleksey Chadov – Artem
- Volodymyr Zelenskyy – Igor
- Ville Haapasalo – Oleg Sauna
- Vera Brezhneva – Katya
- Svetlana Khodchenkova – Nastya
- Anastasia Zadorozhnaya – Alisa
- Olesya Zheleznyak – Pelageya
- Alika Smekhova – neighbor Raisa Montievna
- Liza Arzamasova – Vera, sister of Nastya
- Philipp Kirkorov – Saint Valentine
- Sabina Ahmedova – girlfriend of "Sauna"

== Production ==
The film was produced in New York City, New York. The other films of this trilogy are Love in the Big City 2 and Love in Vegas.
