= Emin (singer) =

Azeri singer and businessman (born 1979)

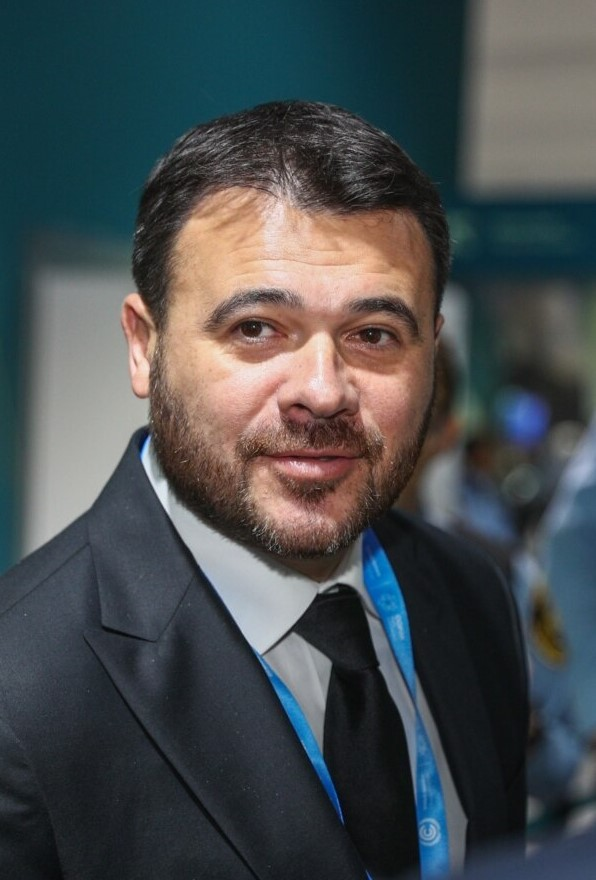
- Emin in 2024
- Born: Emin Araz oğlu Ağalarov; 12 December 1979 (age 46); Baku, Azerbaijan SSR, USSR
- Education: Marymount Manhattan College
- Occupations: singer; songwriter
- Years active: 1998–present
- Spouses: Leyla Aliyeva (m. 2006; div. 2015) Alyona Gavrilova (m. 2018; div. 2020) (m. 2024)
- Children: 4
- Father: Aras Agalarov
- Honours: People's Artiste of Azerbaijan (2018)
- Website: emin-music.com

Emin Aras oghlu Agalarov (Azerbaijani: Emin Araz oğlu Ağalarov, also known as Emin Arazovich Agalarov, Russian: Эмин Аразович Агаларов; born 12 December 1979) is an Azerbaijani singer and businessman. A president of Agalarov Development as well as the chairman of the Azerbaijan-Russia Business Council, he is involved in music and is known mononymously by his stage name Emin. He performs in English, Azerbaijani and Russian. In 2018, Agalarov was awarded the honorary title of People's Artiste of Azerbaijan.

== Early life ==
Emin Arasovich Agalarov was born in Baku, Azerbaijan. He is the son of Azerbaijani–Russian oligarch Aras Agalarov, head of the Crocus Group. Emin's father is Azerbaijani and his mother is Jewish. He considers himself a Muslim. His family moved to Moscow when Emin was four years old. When he was 13, his parents sent him to a school in Switzerland. Agalarov moved to Tenafly, New Jersey, US in 1994 and graduated from Tenafly High School in 1997. He graduated from Marymount Manhattan College in New York City.

== Business career ==
Agalarov began his career in 2001 at Crocus Group, where he initially served as Commercial Director and later became Vice President. In 2014, he was appointed First Vice President of Crocus Group.

In December 2024, Agalarov was elected chairman of the Azerbaijan-Russia Business Council,

== Music career ==
In 2010, Agalarov relocated to London to collaborate with producer Brian Rawling. Their partnership resulted in the album Wonder, which became a BBC Radio 2 Album of the Week. Agalarov’s follow-up, After the Thunder, produced two BBC Radio 2 Singles of the Week and received significant airplay on UK radio.

His most outstanding achievement happened one year later when he performed at the 2013 Miss Universe Contest. A TV audience of over one billion watched.

It was during Miss Universe rehearsals that Agalarov persuaded Donald Trump to make an Apprentice-style cameo appearance in the video for Agalarov’s single, “In Another Life.”

In 2014, Agalarov won a World Music Award following his performance earlier in the evening. Held in Monaco that year, fellow guest performers included Miley Cyrus, Flo Rida, and Mariah Carey.

Then, a few months later, Sony ATV signed Agalarov to a publishing contract, followed by his signing a record deal with Warner Music.

In 2015, Agalarov collaborated with multi-Grammy award-winning music legend Nile Rodgers on the hit single "Boomerang." The remix of "Boomerang" reached 9th on Billboard's dance charts. Later that year, he supported Take That on part of their European tour.

Early in 2023, Agalarov recorded the album, Now or Never, with 16-time Grammy winner David Foster. Released in February 2024, the album features music made by his biggest influence, Elvis Presley and includes duets with Katharine McPhee, Nicole Scherzinger, and Engelbert Humperdinck.

== Interference in the U.S. elections ==
In 2017, U.S. media reported that in June 2016, with Emin acting as an intermediary, the son of the U.S. president, Donald Trump Jr., met with Natalia Veselnitskaya, a Russian lawyer, expecting her to provide compromising material on Hillary Clinton. Trump Jr. later stated that Veselnitskaya did not have any meaningful information. In addition, media outlets reported that earlier, Prosecutor General Yuri Chaika and businessman Aras Agalarov, Emin’s father, had discussed at one of their meetings the possibility of transferring compromising material on Clinton. This meeting is one of the episodes examined in Robert Mueller’s investigation into Russian interference in the U.S. presidential election.

== Personal life ==
Agalarov is the son of Aras Agalarov, an Azerbaijani-Russian billionaire. From 2006 to 2015, he was married to Leyla Aliyeva, the daughter of the President of Azerbaijan, Ilham Aliyev. The couple had twin sons in 2008 and adopted a girl, after their divorce, in 2015. In 2018, Agalarov married the former model and businesswoman Alyona Gavrilova and had a daughter. They divorced in 2020 and remarried in 2024.

== Filmography ==
Year	Film	Role
2013	Love in Vegas	Himself
2018	Night Shift	Chernyavskiy

Preceded by Jan Delay	Eurovision Song Contest; Final Interval act 2012	Succeeded by Loreen; Sarah Dawn Finer
