= Vera Brezhneva =

Ukrainian singer (born 1982)

- Вера Брежнева
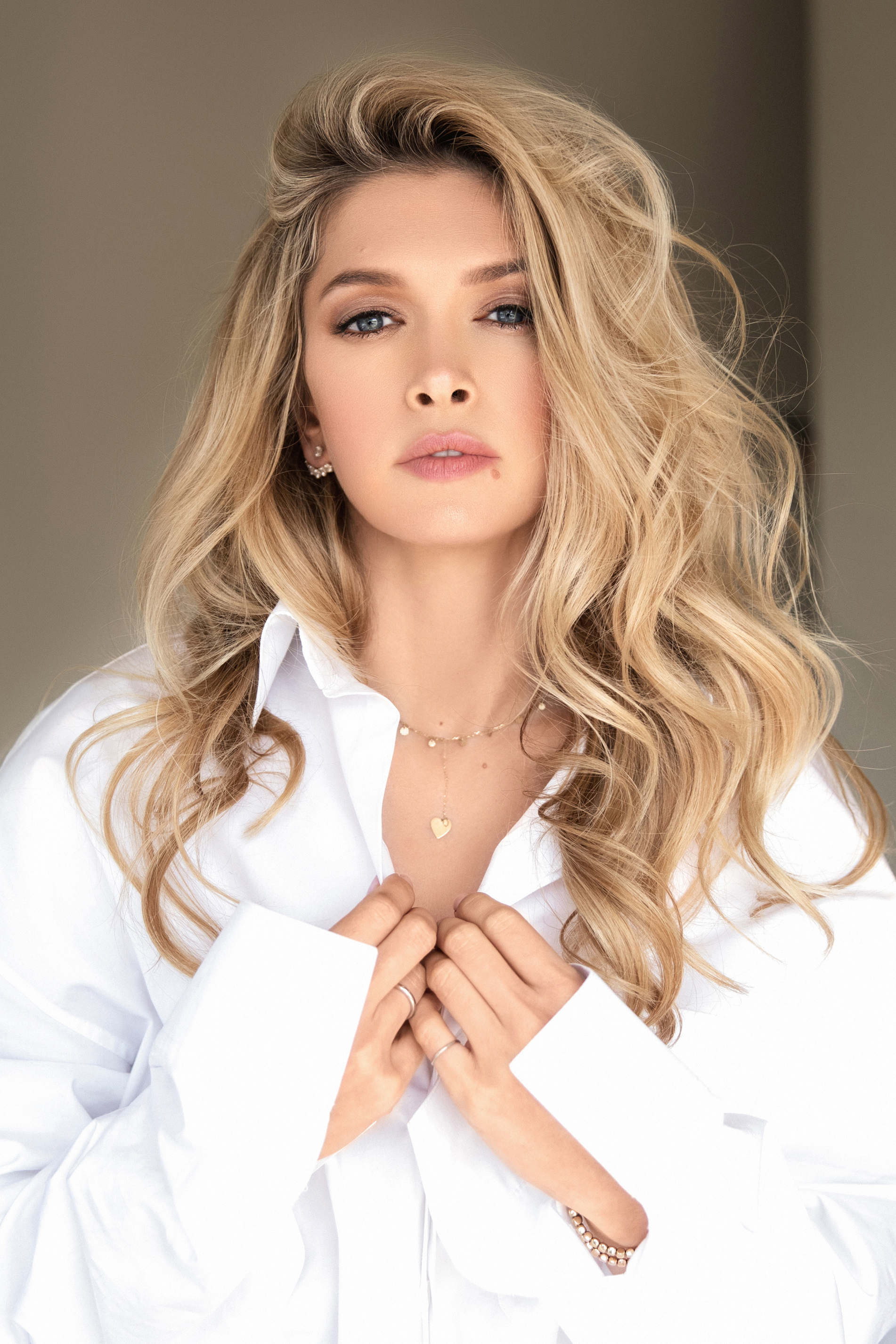
- Brezhneva in 2017
- Born: Vira Viktorivna Halushka (Віра Вікторівна Галушка); 3 February 1982 (age 44); Dniprodzerzhynsk, Ukrainian SSR, Soviet Union
- Citizenship: Ukraine
- Education: Dnipro Institute of Infrastructure and Transport
- Occupations: Singer; television presenter; actress
- Years active: 2003-present
- Spouses: Mykhailo Kiperman (m. 2006; div. 2012); Konstantin Meladze (m. 2015; div. 2023)
- Children: 2
- Musical career
- Genre: Pop
- Instrument: Vocals
- Labels: Velvet; Moon; Monolit; Misteriya Zvuka; Pervoye Muzykalnoye
- Formerly of: Nu Virgos
- Website: brezhneva.com

Vira Viktorivna Halushka (Note: In this name that follows East Slavic naming customs, the patronymic is Viktorivna and the family name is Halushka.; Ukrainian: Віра Вікторівна Галушка, pronounced [ˈwirɐ ˈwiktor⁽ʲ⁾iu̯nɐ hɐˈluʃkɐ]; Russian: Вера Викторовна Галушка, romanised: Vera Viktorovna Galushka) (born 3 February 1982), known mononymously as Vira (stylised in Latin all caps) and previously by the stage name Vera Brezhneva, (Note: Russian: Вера Брежнева, pronounced [ˈvʲera ˈbrʲeʐnʲɪvɐ]; Ukrainian: Віра Брежнєва) is a Ukrainian singer, television presenter, and actress.

Brezhneva began her career in 2002 as a member of the Ukrainian girl group Nu Virgos, achieving international success. After leaving the band in 2007, she embarked on a solo career primarily based in Russia and remained popular in Eastern Europe and the Baltic countries. She has released three studio albums, two extended plays, and numerous standalone singles. She also acted in multiple Russian-language films, including the Love in the Big City franchise and two Yolki installments, and appeared as a presenter on Russian television. Throughout her career, she has been recognised as a sex symbol. Her accolades include Golden Gramophone Awards and ZD Awards. In 2014, she became a United Nations Goodwill Ambassador for UNAIDS. Following the 2022 Russian invasion of Ukraine, she left Russia, changed her stage name, and switched to recording in Ukrainian.

== Early life ==
Vira Viktorivna Halushka was born on 3 February 1982 in Dniprodzerzhynsk, in the Ukrainian SSR of the Soviet Union. Her parents Viktor and Tamara worked at the Prydniprovsky Chemical Plant. She has three sisters, one older sister named Halyna and younger twins named Anastasia and Viktoria. She earned a degree by correspondence from the faculty of economics of the Dnipropetrovsk Institute of Railway Engineering, specialising in accounting.

== Career ==
=== 2002–2007: Nu Virgos (VIA Gra) ===
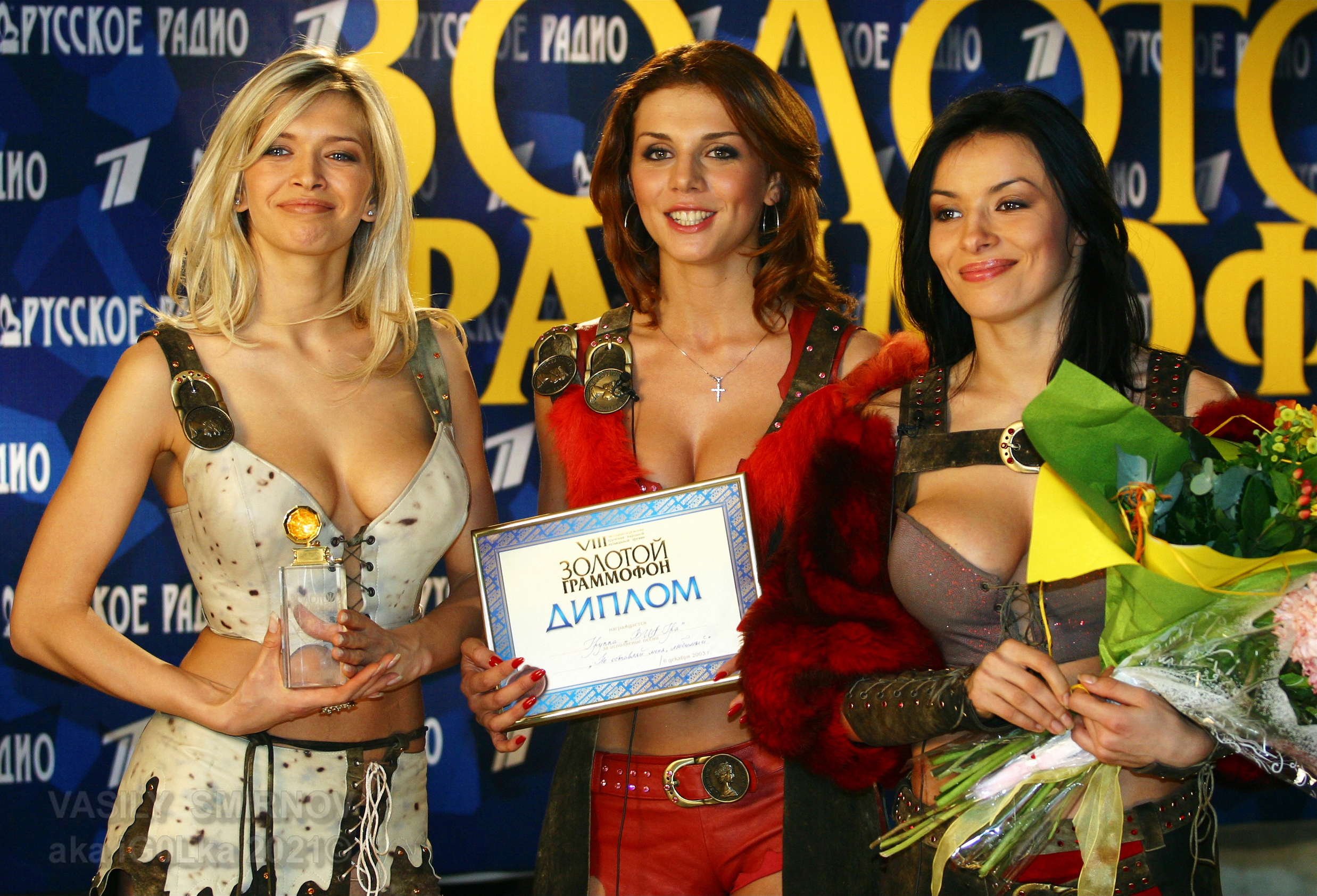
From left to right: Brezhneva, Anna Sedokova, and Nadia Meiher, the "golden lineup" of Nu Virgos, at the 2003 Golden Gramophone Awards

In 2002, Halushka participated in a casting organised to find a singer to replace Alena Vinnitskaya in the girl group Nu Virgos and succeeded. She was given the stage name Vera Brezhneva by the group's producer Dmytro Kostyuk in reference to Leonid Brezhnev because she was born in the same city as him. In January 2003, Nu Virgos started performing in the new lineup of Nadia Meiher, Anna Sedokova, and Brezhneva. This lineup recorded the Russian-language studio albums Stop! Snyato! and Biologiya as well as the English-language studio album Stop! Stop! Stop! (all 2003). Due to its massive popularity, it gained the name of the "golden lineup". The Stop! Synato! track "Ne ostavlyay menya, lyubimyy!" (Не оставляй меня, любимый!; Don't Leave Me, Love!) won a Golden Gramophone Award at the 2003 ceremony, while the Valery Meladze collaboration "Prityazhenya bolshe net" (Притяженья больше нет; There Is No More Attraction) won one in 2004. She also contributed to the compilation album Brillianty (2005), which spawned a single of the same title that gave its name to the "diamond lineup" consisting of Brezhneva, Meiher, and Albina Dzhanabaeva. They received a special Diamond Gramophone at the 2005 Golden Gramophone Awards. After another Golden Gramophone Award in 2006, Brezhneva left to pursue a solo career in July 2007. Her last studio album with Nu Virgos, the English-language L.M.L., was released in September 2007, while her final single with the group, "Tsvetok i nozh" (Цветок и нож; The Flower and the Knife), won a Golden Gramophone Award at that year's ceremony in December.

=== 2008–2022: Solo career in Russia ===
Brezhneva was the presenter of the Russian version of the Power of 10 game show, Magia desyati (Магия десяти; Magic of 10), which ran on Channel One Russia for two seasons from 7 January to 31 August 2008. The same year, she participated in the second season of the Russian ice show contest Ice Age. She released her debut solo single "Ya ne igrayu" (Я не играю; I Don't Play) on 19 May 2008 and followed it up with "Nirvana" (Нирвана) on 27 October. She played Katya in the 2009 film Love in the Big City and performed a song of the same name for its soundtrack, "Lyubov v bolshom gorode" (Любовь в большом городе); it was released as a single on 5 February 2009. She reprised the role in its 2010 sequel and appeared alongside two other actresses from the film in the music video for its main song, "Leto vsegda!" (Лето всегда!; Summer Always!) by the group Diskoteka Avariya, released on 14 February 2010. She released three further singles that year: "Lyubov spasyot mir" (Любовь спасёт мир; Love Will Save the World) on 13 April, "Pronto" (Пронто) with Potap on 16 September, and "Lepestkami slyoz" (Лепестками слёз; By the Petals of Tears) with Dan Balan on 1 November. All previously released singles, with the exception of "Leto vsegda!", were included on her debut solo album Lyubov spasyot mir (2010). A premiere event for the album was held on 24 November 2010 at Blanc Café in Moscow. That December, she won her first Golden Gramophone Award as a solo artist for the song "Lyubov spasyot mir".

Brezhneva appeared as herself in the 2010 film Yolki (Ёлки) and its 2011 sequel. On 18 May 2011, she released the single "Realnaya zhizn'" (Реальная жизнь; Real Life). "Sexy Bambina" was released as the last single from Lyubov spasyot mir on 30 November 2011. She released three singles in 2012: "Bessonnitsa" (Бессонница; Insomnia) on 6 June, "Ishchu tebya" (Ищу тебя; I Am Looking for You) from the soundtrack to 8 First Dates on 18 June, and the DJ Smash collaboration "Lyubov na rasstonyanii" (Любовь на расстоянии; Love from a Distance) on 21 September. In late November, she starred in Aleksandr Voytinskiy's film Jungle (Джунгли), which was panned by critics. 2013 saw the release of three singles: "Khoroshiy den'" (Хороший день; Good Day), which won her a Golden Gramophone Award, "Skazhi" (Скажи; Say) with Druha Rika, and "Dom" (Дом; Home) from the soundtrack to the 2014 sequel to Love in the Big City; she also reprised her role in the film.

After the Russo-Ukrainian War broke out in February 2014, Brezhneva continued her career in Russia. She released three singles that year: "Dobroe utro" (Доброе утро; Good Morning), which won her a Golden Gramophone Award, "Luna" with Aleksandr Revva, and "Devochka moya" (Девочка моя; My Girl). Those were followed in 2015 by "Mamochka" (Мамочка; "Mommy"), leading up to the release of her second studio album Ververa on 28 April 2015; it contains most of the songs released since "Realnaya zhizn'". In 2016, she starred in 8 Best Dates. Between 2015 and 2020, she released a series of standalone singles. Two of them, "Lyubite drug druga" (Любите друг друга; Love Each Other) from the Yolki 7 soundtrack and "Zla ne derzhi" (Зла не держи; Don't Hold a Grudge) with Elena Sever, won Golden Gramophone Awards at the 2019 ceremony.

In 2017, Brezhneva opened a women's boutique in Saint Petersburg with Russian fashion designer Hanna Khmelyova. In 2019, she told Russian television personality Vyacheslav Manucharov that she did not consider herself a Ukrainian singer and was not seen as such by other Ukrainians, citing the lack of Ukrainian-language songs in her repertoire and her career in Russia; the statement received criticism in Ukraine. Her first extended play V. was released in 2020 and contained her first song in Ukrainian, co-written by Jerry Heil. Following another few standalone singles, her final Russian-language release was a cover of "30 Minut" by t.A.T.u. for a tribute album marking the 20th anniversary of the group's debut album 200 Po Vstrechnoy. The tribute album was released on 5 November 2021.

=== 2022–present: Break from the Russian industry ===
Following the Russian invasion of Ukraine in February 2022, Brezhneva expressed her support for Ukraine and broke away from her Russian career. She shifted her career towards releasing music in the Ukrainian language and changed her stage name to Vira (in Latin letters). Her first release under that name was the single "Vyshyvanka" (Вишиванка), a collaboration with Ukrainian singer Tayanna, on 19 October 2022. Her first Ukrainian-language extended play Dyakuyu (Дякую; Thank You) was released on 6 October 2023. It was preceded by two singles, "Taki my lyudy" (Такi ми люди; Such People We Are) and the title track. Her Saint Petersburg boutique closed at the end of that year as a result of her departure from Russia. She released the standalone singles "Zupyny" (Зупини; Stop) on 20 September 2024, "Vse myne" (Все мине; Everything Will Pass) on 22 November 2024, and "Ty" (Ти; You) on 10 January 2025. Her first full-length Ukrainian album Syayvo (Сяйво; Radiance) was released on 25 September 2026. It was preceded by the singles "Krasyva" (Красива; Beautiful) on 25 June, "Moye sonechko" (Моє сонечко; My Sunshine) on 24 July, and "Ne dohovoryla" (Не договорила; I Was Not Finished Speaking) on 26 August.

== Personal life ==
Brehneva has a daughter born in 2001 from her relationship with Vitaliy Voychenko, deputy mayor of Yalta from 2010 to 2013. She was married to Ukrainian businessman Mykhailo Kiperman from 2006 to 2012, and they have a daughter born in 2009. She married songwriter and producer Konstantin Meladze, with whom she frequently worked, in 2015. They separated in 2022 and divorced in 2023, allegedly over her disapproval of his continued work in the Russian real estate and music markets after the Russian invasion of Ukraine. Prior to the invasion, Brezhneva resided primarily in Russia. Since 2022, she has divided her time between Italy, Latvia, and Ukraine. As of November 2024, she is in a relationship.

== Discography ==
=== Singles ===
Year	Single	English translation	Chart Positions	
Year	Single	English translation	Ukraine	Russia
2008	"Я не играю"	I don't play	—	6
2008	"Нирвана"	Nirvana	—	80
2009	"Любовь в большом городе"	Love in the big city	—	19
2010	"Любовь спасёт мир"	Love will save the world	1	1
2010	"Пронто" (with Potap)	Pronto	—	31
2010	"Лепестками слёз" (with Dan Balan)	By the petals of tears	1	1
2011	"Реальная жизнь"	Real life	1	1
2012	"Sexy Bambina"		1	—
2012	"Бессонница"	Insomnia	6	20
2012	"Ищу тебя"	I am looking for you	7	—
2012	"Любовь на расстоянии" (featuring DJ Smash)	Love from a distance	48	14
2013	"Хороший день"	Nice day	2	11
2013	"Дом"	Home	—	—
2014	"Доброе утро"	Good morning	1	12
2014	"Luna" (featuring Aleksandr Revva)	Moon	142	—
2014	"Девочка моя"	My girl	—	—
2015	"Мамочка"	Mommy	15	—
2015	"Этажи" (with T-killah)	Floors	—	—
2016	"Номер 1"	Number 1	16	—
2016	"Feel"	Feel	854	—
2017	"Близкие люди"	Close people	—	—
2018	"Ты мой человек"	You are my person	—	—
2019	"Я не святая"	I'm not a saint	—	—
2019	"Пой и танцуй"	Sing and dance	—	—
2019	"Время летать"	Time to fly	—	—
2020	"Хорошие новости"	Good news	—	—
2020	"ВЕЧЕРиНОЧКА" (with Monatik)	Evening and night	—	—
2021	"Ты не один"	You are not alone	—	—
2021	"Розовый дым"	Pink smoke	—	—
2021	"Не надо"	No need	—	—
2021	"Тихо"	Quiet	—	—

=== Albums ===
Studio albums

- Lyubov spasyot mir (2010)
- VERVERA (2015)
- Syayvo (2026)

=== EPs ===
- V. (2020)
- Dyakuyu (2023)

== Awards and accolades ==
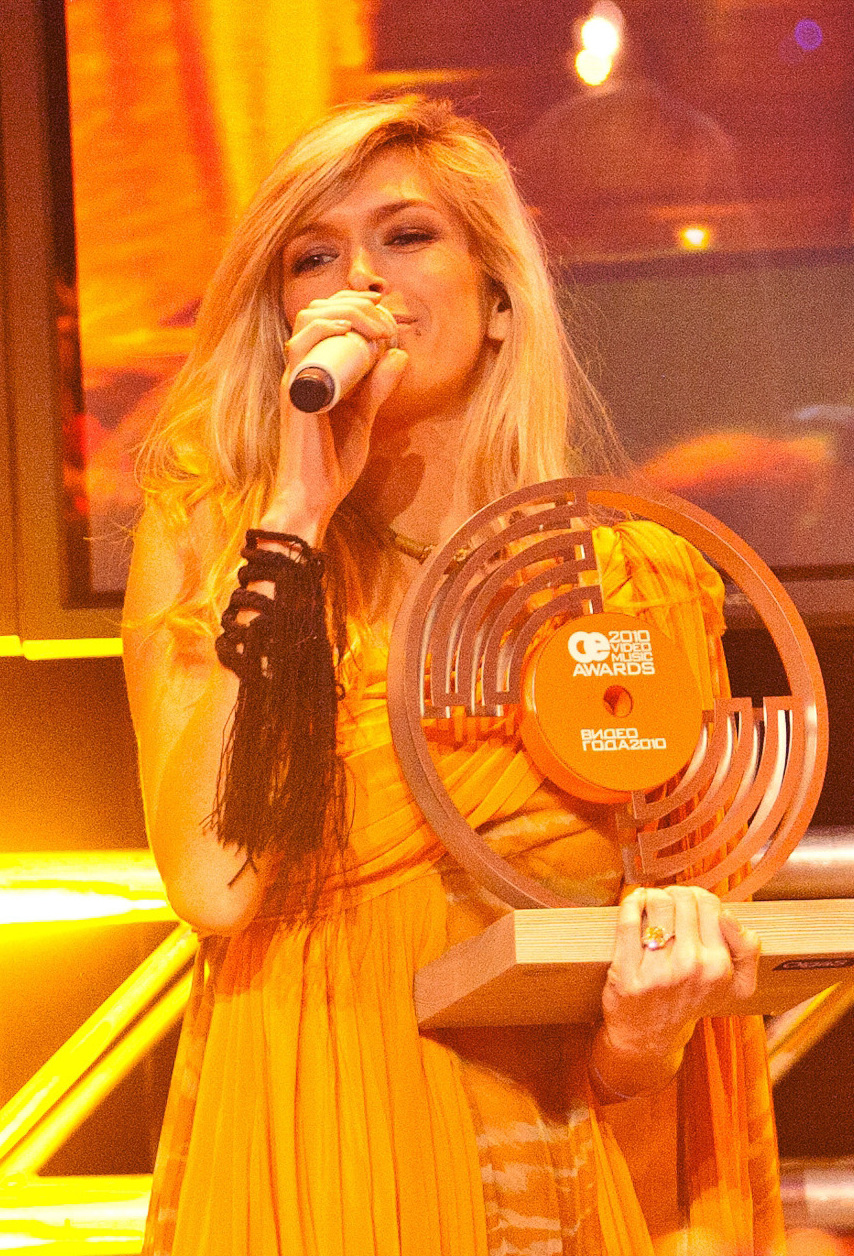
Brezhneva with her Video of the Year trophy at the 2010 OE Video Music Awards

Over the course of her career, Brezhneva has received awards and accolades for her music, appearance, and activism. She won five Golden Gramophone Awards as a member of Nu Virgos and an additional five as a solo artist. (Note: Golden Gramophones received by Nu Virgos while Brezhneva was a member:) (Note: Golden Gramophones received by Brezhneva as a solo artist:) She won Artist of the Year at the 2011 Muz-TV Music Awards. In 2016, she received the International Music Prize "Big Apple Music Awards" in the category "Best Eastern European Artist" and special award for charitable activities "Person" in New York City.

Brezhneva received the title "Woman of the Year" from Glamour Russia in 2010. In 2007, 2012, 2015, and 2016 she was named the sexiest woman in Russia by the men's magazine Maxim.

== Notes ==
Preceded by Nastya Kamenskykh	Most beautiful by VIVA! 2010; With: Yevgeny Komarovsky	Succeeded by Oksana Marchenko
