= Moskva (album) =

Studio album by Glukoza
- Released: 2005
- Recorded: 2005
- Genres: Pop, pop rock
- Length: 51:14
- Label: Monolit
- Producer: Maxim Fadeev

Glukoza chronology
Nostra (2003)	Moskva (2005)	Luchshye Pesni (2008)

Moskva (English: Moscow,Russian: Москва) is the second and final studio album by Russian pop group Glukoza. After the album was released Natasha Ionova left the group to start a solo career.

== Track listing ==
No.	Title	Lyrics	Music	Length
1.	"Schweine" (Швайне; from German language "Pigs")	Natalya Ionova, Maxim Fadeev	Fadeev	4:25
2.	"Sneg Idyot" (Снег идёт; It's Snowing)	Ionova, Fadeev	Fadeev (based on Mikael Tariverdiev's "Snow Over Leningrad" from The Irony of Fate Soundtrack)	3:58
3.	"Gorilla" (Горилла; Gorilla)	Ionova, Fadeev	Fadeev	5:01
4.	"K Chortu" (К чёрту; To hell)	Fadeev	Fadeev	5:14
5.	"Yura" (Юра)	Fadeev	Fadeev	3:26
6.	"Moskva" (Москва; Moscow)	Fadeev	Fadeev	3:45
7.	"Pipets" (Пипец; Shit)	Ionova, Fadeev	Fadeev	3:08
8.	"Korabli" (Корабли; Ships)	Fadeev	Fadeev	3:48
9.	"Oy-Oy" (Ой-ой; Oh-oh)	Ionova, Fadeev	Fadeev	3:39
10.	"Karina" (Карина)	Fadeev	Fadeev	3:36

Bonus tracks
No.	Title	Length
11.	"Москва" (version 2/Music Video)
12.	"Юра" (version 2/Music Video)
13.	"Швайне" (version 2/Music Video)

== Use in other media ==
The song "Schweine" is featured in the video game, Grand Theft Auto IV, on Vladivostok FM, but was removed from the tenth anniversary release due to the expiration of the licensing with Rockstar.
