= Yevgeny Komarovsky =

Ukrainian doctor and TV host (born 1960)

- Євген Комаровський
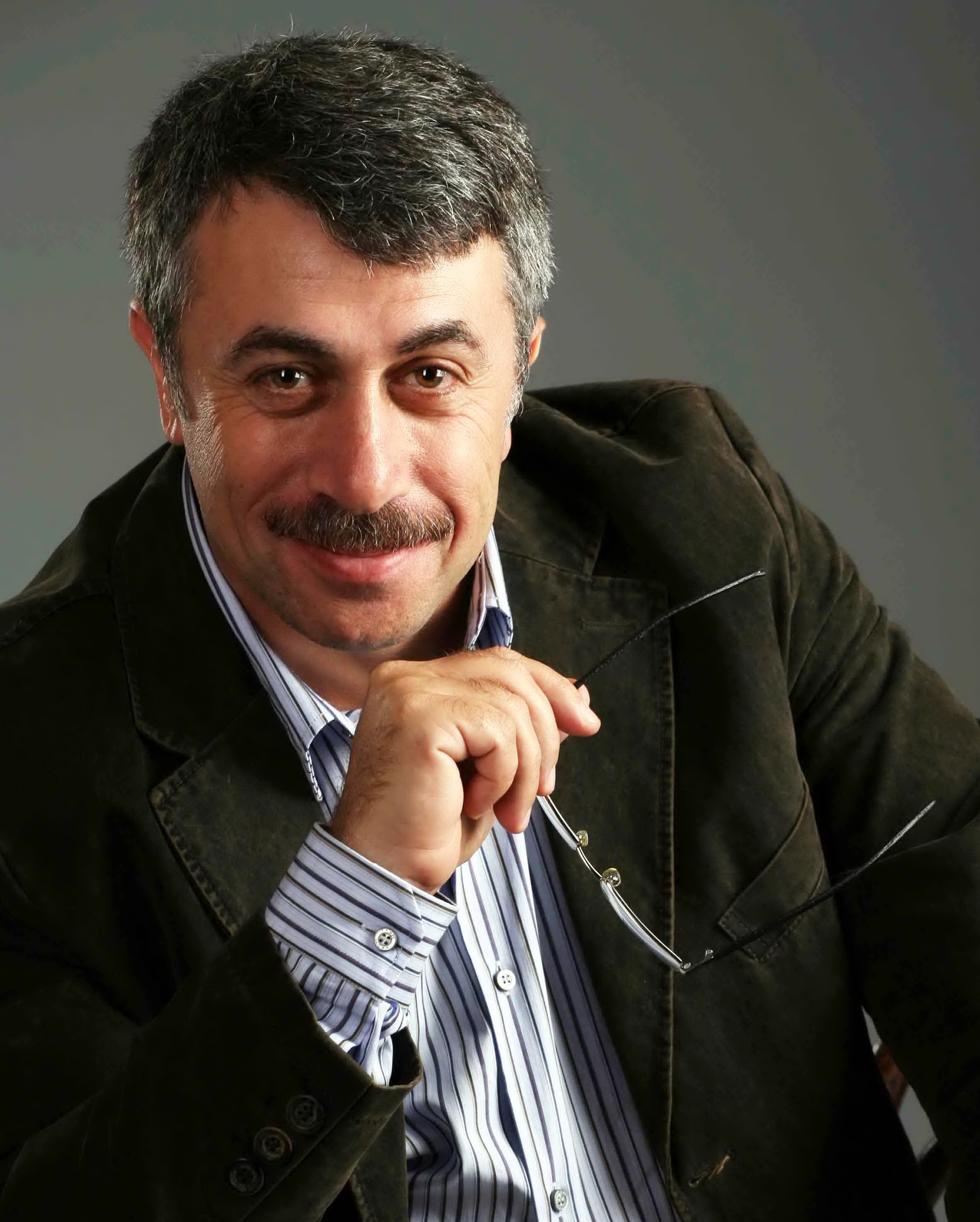
- Komarovsky in 2009
- Born: October 15, 1960 (age 66); Kharkiv, Ukrainian SSR, Soviet Union
- Education: Kharkiv National Medical University
- Occupations: Pediatrician; writer; TV presenter

Yevhen Olehovych Komarovskyi (Ukrainian: Євген Олегович Комаровський; Russian: Евгений Олегович Комаровский, romanized: Yevgeny Olegovich Komarovsky; born October 15, 1960) is a Ukrainian paediatrician, doctor of the highest category, writer, and TV presenter.

== Biography ==
Yevgeny Olegovich Komarovsky was born in 1960 in Kharkiv into a family of engineers. His mother is Jewish, his father is Ukrainian. He graduated from Kharkiv National Medical University (Pediatric Faculty).

In 1983 he started work in the regional Kharkiv infant clinical hospital, in the intensive care unit. From 1991 until 2000, he was head of the infectious department. Since 1996, Candidate of Medical Sciences. He is the author of numerous scientific works, as well as popular science articles and books.

In March 2010, the project School of Dr. Komarovsky started on the Ukrainian television channel Inter. From February 25, 2017, he conducted the Medicine Show on Russkoye Radio. Since February 24, 2022, Dr. Komarovsky has worked tirelessly in Kharkiv infant clinic and elsewhere, caring for as many individuals as possible under dire conditions. He has also become a vocal spokesperson for peace and a return to sanity, with frequent appearances on youTube.

== Political career ==
On April 17, 2019, Komarovsky joined the team of Volodymyr Zelenskyy, then a presidential candidate. However, the same year, he discontinued his relationship with Zelenskyy.

On November 9, 2021, he said there should be three official languages in the country: Ukrainian, Russian, and English.

== Personal life ==
He is married to his wife Yekaterina, who is an ophthalmologist. They have two sons. Komarovsky enjoys ice fishing, literature, music and tourism.

Preceded by Konstantin Meladze	Most beautiful by VIVA! 2010; With: Vera Brezhneva	Succeeded by Volodymyr Klychko
