= Igor Jijikine =

Russian-American actor

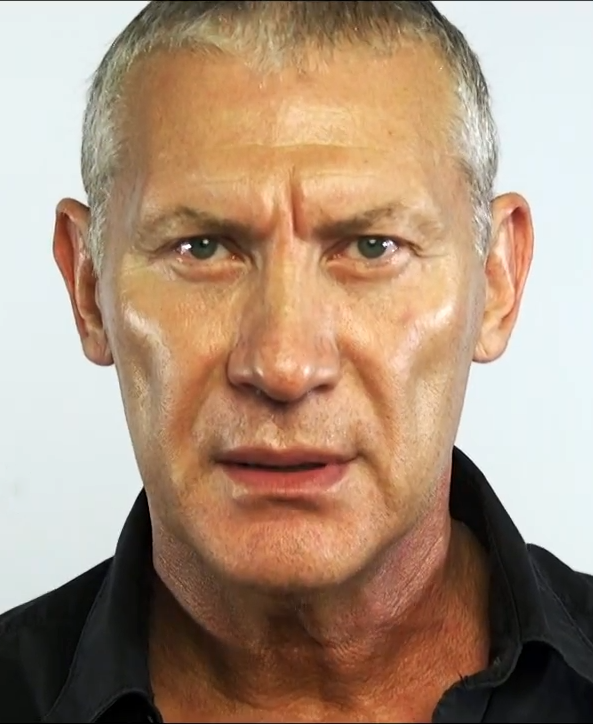
- Igor Jijikine in July 2018.
- Born: Igor Vitalievich Jijikine; 8 October 1965 (age 60); Moscow, Russian SFSR, Soviet Union
- Citizenship: Russia; United States
- Occupation: Actor
- Years active: 1999–present
- Spouse: Natalia (divorced)

Igor Vitalievich Jijikine (Russian: И́горь Вита́льевич Жижи́кин, romanized: Igor Vitalevich Zhizhikin; born 8 October 1965) is a Russian-American actor working in Los Angeles and Moscow.

== Early life and career ==
Jijikine was born in Moscow. From 1983 to 1988 he studied drama and acrobatics. From 1982 to 1984, Jijikine performed mandatory military service with the Soviet Special Forces unit Spetsnaz. He has performed on stage with the Moscow State Circus, Donn Arden's "Jubilee" and Cirque du Soleil's "Mystere" in Las Vegas.

== Film career ==
In recent years, Jijikine has worked with such directors as Steven Spielberg, Clint Eastwood and J. J. Abrams and has appeared in numerous commercial spots for major brands. In Spielberg's Indiana Jones and the Kingdom of the Crystal Skull, Igor plays the role of Colonel Dovchenko (taking over the series' tough guy role held by the late Pat Roach), the ruthless leader of the Soviet commando team searching for the crystal skull. His commercially most successful films have been Indiana Jones and the Kingdom of the Crystal Skull which grossed US$786 million and The Tourist which grossed US$278 million worldwide.

== Computer games ==
Jijikine appeared in the real-time strategy games, Emperor: Battle for Dune, Red Alert 2 and its expansion Yuri's Revenge, by Westwood Studios. In addition to appearing in the games' cutscene sequences, he modeled as a Soviet soldier appearing in the front cover of Red Alert 2.

== Sports ==
Igor is an accomplished sportsman and was honored as Master of Sports in Russia.

== Filmography ==
Year	Film	Roles	Notes
2002	Alias	Chopper	
2002	Blood Work	Mikhail Bolotov	
2002	Robbery Homicide Division	Thug #1	
2003	Klepto	Thug #1	
2004	Target	Leather Jacket	
2004	Smatyvay udochki	Rabid - Beshenyy	
2005	Muzhskoy sezon. Barkhatnaya revolyutsiya	Pike	
2008	Montana		
2008	Indiana Jones and the Kingdom of the Crystal Skull	Colonel Antonin Dovchenko	
2009	Driven to Kill	Mikhail Abramov	
2009	Burn Notice	Vlad	
2010	Love in the Big City 2	Oleg	
2010	Shadows in Paradise	Spider	
2010	Supreme Champion	Caras	
2010	The Tourist	Virginsky	
2011	Chuck	Armaund	
2011	Slove		
2011	8 pervykh svidaniy		
2011	True Justice	Stefan Sedenui	
2012	Safe	Chemyakin	
2012	Political Animals	Victor Porchoff	
2012	Solovey-Razboynik		
2012	Brigada: Naslednik	Vvedensky	
2013	The Maul		
2014	Love in the Big City 3	Oleg	
2014	Viy	Dorosh	
2014	Ch/B	The Head of The District Department of the Interior	
2015	Risk for Honor	Nikolai	
2015	Ierey-san. Ispoved samuraya	Yakhontov	
2018	Night Shift	Korneev	
2018	Hunter Killer	Lieutenant Tretiak	
2019	The Brave (a.k.a. Lazarat)	Agim Hoxha	
2019	Viy 2: Journey to China	Dead Cossack	
2019	Polyarny	Artur	TV-series
2019	Black Stairs (Chernaya lestnica)	Melnikov	
2022	Kompromat	Sagarine	
2024	Altered		
2025	AI-4U Wired Together	Colonel	
