= Inna Korobkina =

Russian Canadian actress

- Born: Magadan, Russian SFSR, Soviet Union
- Occupation: Actress/Creative Director
- Years active: 2000–present

Inna Korobkina is a Russian Canadian actress. She has acted in Russian and English.

== Career ==
Korobkina is known for her appearance in the 2004 remake film Dawn of the Dead. She also appeared in several T.V. series like Beautiful People, Angela's Eyes or The Newsroom and had some minor roles in movies like How to Deal and Far Cry 6.

== Filmography ==
- The Ladies Man (2000) .... Hef's Girl
- How to Deal (2003) .... Flight Attendant (uncredited)
- 1-800-Missing (1 episode, "Ties That Bind", 2003) .... Nadia Fedorova
- Dawn of the Dead (2004) .... Luda
- Surviving the Dawn (2004) (V) .... Herself (also archive footage)
- Attack of the Living Dead (2004) (V) .... Herself (also archive footage)
- The Newsroom (1 episode, "The British Accent", 2004) .... Saleswoman
- Riding the Bus with My Sister (2005) (TV) .... Model/Bride
- Lovebites (unknown episodes, 2006) .... Foreign Chick
- Beautiful People (1 episode, "Das Boots", 2006) .... Chloe
- Angela's Eyes (2 episodes, "Lyin' Eyes" and "The Camera's Eye", 2006) .... Chameleon
- Across the River to Motor City (1 episode, "Treat Her Right", 2007) .... Isobel
- The Border (1 episode, "Compromising Positions", 2008) .... Svetlana Karpova
- Driven to Kill (2009) .... Catherine Goldstein
- Let the Game Begin (2010) .... Bridesmaid
- Transformers: Dark of the Moon (2011) .... Russian Girl
- Clean Me (2013) .... Julia Markham
