= AI-4U Wired Together =

- Directed by: Aleksey Chadov
- Written by: Vyacheslav Dubovikov; Aleksey Chadov; Ekaterina Chudova; Aleksandr Vorozheykin; Pyotr Mordvintsev; Elvin Mamedov
- Produced by: Sergey Selyanov (ru); Aleksey Chadov; Andrey Rydanov; Lyubov Sviblova; Maria Matveeva; Igor Poptsov
- Starring: Leon Kemstach; Aleksey Chadov; Tatyana Babenkova; Alexandra Tikhonova; Lyuba Druzyak; Igor Khripunov; Igor Zhizhikin
- Cinematography: Konstantin Panasyuk
- Edited by: Azamat Ermatov
- Music by: Nikolay Rostov
- Production companies: CTB Film Company; Red Star Films; Cinema Fund
- Distributed by: National Media Group Film Distribution
- Release date: October 2, 2025 (Russia)
- Running time: 97 minutes
- Country: Russia
- Language: Russian
- Budget: ₽235.4 million
- Box office: ₽95 million

AI-4U Wired Together (Russian: (Не)искусственный интеллект, romanized: (Ne) iskusstvennyy intellekt, lit. '(Non) artificial intelligence') is a 2025 Russian teen science fiction comedy film written, produced, directed by and starring Aleksey Chadov about a teenager who finds himself inside a robot and can only return home if he makes a deal with the artificial intelligence, and also starring Leon Kemstach, Alexandra Tikhonova and Lyuba Druzyak.

This film was theatrically released in Russia on October 2, 2025, by National Media Group Film Distribution.

== Plot ==
During an excursion to a research center, 17-year-old first-year student Zhenya accidentally gets into a test sample of a new model of the robot "Apostle" (A.P.O100L), which has its own will and mind. Having received a random pilot, the machine takes control and decides to escape from the laboratory. Now, in order to return home, Zhenya will have to find a common language with artificial intelligence.

== Cast ==
- Leon Kemstach as Zhenya
  - Aleksandr Pinaev as Zhenya, a little boy
- Aleksey Chadov as Zhenya's father
- Tatyana Babenkova as Zhenya's mother
- Alexandra Tikhonova as Sveta, Zhenya's classmate at Baumanka
- Lyuba Druzyak as Nika, a child
- Igor Khripunov as Professor Loginov, who created the Apostle and treats him like his son, and Sveta's father
- Igor Zhizhikin as Colonel
- Aleksandr Samoylenko as Kotov
- Boris Kamorzin as Mitrich
- Sergey Chirkov as Zyablikov
- Andrey Sviridov as Maloy
- Zakhar Ronzhin as Kesha
- Kirill Snegiryov as Bobrov

== Production ==
The production was carried out by the film companies CTB and RED STAR FILMS with the support of the Cinema Fund.

=== Filming ===
Principal photography began in September 2024. Filming took place in the Moscow, Moscow Oblast, Yaroslavl, and Kostroma until the end of November.
