= Night Shift (2018 film) =

2018 film by Maryus Vaysberg

- Theatrical release poster
- Directed by: Maryus Vaysberg
- Written by: Timur Levchenko; Zinaida Itkina; Andrey Smiyan; Oleg Mastic; Maryus Vaysberg
- Produced by: Emin Agalarov; Maryus Vaysberg
- Starring: Vladimir Yaglych; Pavel Derevyanko
- Cinematography: Bruce Alan Greene
- Edited by: David Dodson; Kirill Kozlov
- Music by: Brian S. Carr
- Production companies: Vice Films; Non-Stop Production
- Distributed by: Central Partnership
- Release date: June 21, 2018 (Russia).
- Running time: 96 minutes
- Country: Russia
- Language: Russian
- Budget: $1.5 million
- Box office: $1 883 024

Night Shift (Russian: Ночная смена, romanized: Nochnaya smena) is a 2018 Russian comedy film directed by Maryus Vaysberg. It stars Vladimir Yaglych and Pavel Derevyanko.

== Plot ==
Max works at a local factory as a welder. The salary is low, but it is enough to support him and his wife Anya. One day he learns bad news - the factory has gone bankrupt and all employees are laid off. He desperately tries to find a new place to work but this proves to be quite difficult due to the economic crisis. Fortunately, Max meets his old friend from school, Lena. After telling her about his problems, he receives an unusual offer - to do striptease.

There is a strip club in the city where new men are wanted. Max agrees to come for an interview. His fitness and physique is satisfactory and the only thing that remains is to learn a few dance moves and he is hired. While hiding his new occupation from Anya, he finds himself in all sorts of ridiculous situations. Her husband's new profession is supposed to stay a secret, but all the lies only end up complicating things.

== Cast ==
- Vladimir Yaglych as Maxim "Max" Samsonov
- Pavel Derevyanko as Sergei "Seryoga" Balashov
- Ksenia Teplova as Anna "Anya" Samsonova, Max's wife
- Vitaliya Korniyenko as Vera Samsonova, the Samsonovs' daughter
- Natalia Bardo as Kristina, striptease dancer
- Anna Mikhailovskaya as Lyudmila
- Emin Agalarov as Igor Chernyavsky, businessman
- Valentina Mazunina as Lena, Max's classmate, strip club manager
- Yelena Valyushkina as Elena Balashova, Sergei's mother
- Sergei Glushko as Zhenya "King Kong"
- Svetlana Listova as Anfisa, an accountant
- Galina Petrova as Betty Slobodkina, a teacher
- Igor Jijikine as Korneev, director of the strip club
- Natalya Bochkareva as Korneev's wife
