= Kidnapping, Caucasian Style! =

- Directed by: Maxim Voronkov
- Written by: Kirill Zubkov
- Based on: Kidnapping, Caucasian Style by Leonid Gaidai
- Produced by: Maxim Voronkov; Valery Glukhov; Ilya Oleynikov
- Starring: Dmitry Sharakois; Anastasia Zadorozhnaya; Gennady Khazanov
- Cinematography: Alexey Belyaev
- Edited by: Yekaterina Pivneva
- Music by: Aleksandr Zatsepin (music used)
- Production company: Ilya Oleynikov's Producer Сenter
- Distributed by: Mosfilm
- Release date: August 21, 2014
- Running time: 95 min
- Country: Russia
- Language: Russian

Kidnapping, Caucasian Style! (Russian: Кавказская пленница!; informally referred to as the Kidnapping, Caucasian Style 2 version) is a Russian comedy film by director Maxim Voronkov. A remake of the 1967 film of the same name, the plot revolves around bride kidnapping, an old tradition that used to exist in certain regions of the North Caucasus.

Dedicated to the memory of Ilya Oleynikov, the film premiered on August 21, 2014. As was the case with the original, filming was done in the Crimea, not in the North Caucasus. The movie was met with strongly negative reviews in the Russian media, with some considering it being one of the worst films made to date, and it was a box-office bomb.

== Plot ==
The plot as a whole repeats the story of the original comedy: journalist Shurik arrives in the Caucasus in order to study local culture and folklore, the ancient customs and traditions of the people in this region. Per chance he meets and befriends a girl in a mountainous town, the beauty Nina, which the gouvernor, wealthy and powerful local Saakhov, is planning to marry — if not willingly then by force. Using the gullible journalist as a strawman, Saakhov and his henchmen (Coward, Fool, and Pro, a trio of comic antiheros) are able to kidnap Nina, all seems to work according to plan. But realizing that he had been deceived, Shurik, who fell for Nina, rushes to rescue his beloved one, for a happy ending.

Nevertheless, in the new version of the film there are some differences from the original. For example, Nina is falling in love with Shurik not by coincidence, but when fate has it that they repeatedly are clashing together, and both come closer to each other from the very beginning of the film. Also, the ending of the story was changed.

== Cast ==
- Dmitry Sharakois as Shurik the journalist (voiced by Sergey Burunov)
- Anastasia Zadorozhnaya as the beauty Nina
- Gennady Khazanov as gouvernor Saakhov
- Ararat Keshyan as Dzhabrail
- Semyon Strugachyov as the "Coward"
- Nikolai Dobrynin as the "Fool"
- Sergey Stepanchenko as the "Pro"
- Mikhail Yefremov as hotel administrator
- Yuli Gusman as head physician of the psychiatric hospital
- Ruslana Pysanka as taxi driver
- Euclid Kyurdzidis as policeman
- Larisa Udovichenko as nurse

== Criticism ==
Reception of the movie was strongly negative. Negative reviews of the film have been published in Afisha, in Komsomolskaya Pravda, in Gazeta.Ru, and in Mail.ru. Most critics viewed the remake as a bad copy of the original, which it reproduces almost frame by frame; with the rare moments of originality being unsuccessful. Vladimir Medinsky, Russia's Minister of Culture, promised not to provide any further funding for Voronkov's films after an appeal from YouTube critic BadComedian. Voronkov has not directed another film since.

At the website Megacritic the production scored 25 points out of 100, and at KinoPoisk only 1.1 out of 10 points. The film was also a flop at the box office, collecting $179,843 on a budget of $3.5 million.
