= Love in Vegas =

2014 Russian-Ukrainian film

Love In Vegas
- Directed by: Maryus Vaysberg, David Dodson
- Screenplay by: Andrey Yakovlev; Marius Weisberg; Mikhail Savin; Yuri Kostyuk; Alexander Bragin; Dmitry Grigorenko; Dmitry Kozlov
- Produced by: Sergey Livnev; Leo Nikolau; Volodymyr Zelenskyy; Boris Shefir; Serhiy Shefir; Andrey Yakovlev
- Starring: Aleksey Chadov; Volodymyr Zelenskyy; Ville Haapasalo; Vera Brezhneva
- Cinematography: Bruce Alan Green
- Production companies: Leopolis; Kvartal 95 Studio
- Release date: March 3, 2014 (Russia)
- Running time: 95 minutes
- Countries: Russia; Ukraine
- Language: Russian
- Budget: $3.5 million
- Box office: Russia $15.9 million, Total $18.7 million

Love in Vegas (Russian: «Любовь в большом городе 3», romanized: Lyubov v bolshom gorode, Love in the Big City 3) is a 2014 Russian-Ukrainian romantic comedy film directed by Maryus Vaysberg and David Dodson. The film was co-produced by the creative association Kvartal 95 Studio. It is the completion of a trilogy about the adventures of three friends in search of true love.

== Plot ==
Since the events described in the second part five years have passed. The heroes of the film settled down: they have expensive cars, nice apartments, successful careers, happy families. But the trouble is Alisa, Nastya and Katya begin to get tired of the annoying everyday life, because all day they are engaged in the upbringing of children and household.

While the mothers are completely occupied with their children, the fathers have the opportunity to distract themselves at work and during rare bar visits. They work all day, and on weekends they sleep or take small family walks, turning their life into a routine.

They wished their children had already grown up. Then they meet an old friend, Saint Valentine (Philip Kirkorov), who comes to help them with their wish...

== Cast ==
- Aleksey Chadov – Artem Isayev
- Volodymyr Zelenskyy – Igor Zelensky
- Ville Haapasalo – Oleg Sauna
- Vera Brezhneva – Katya Isayeva
- Svetlana Khodchenkova – Nastya
- Anastasia Zadorozhnaya – Alisa
- Alexander Petrov – Artyom Isaev, Jr. (adult son of Artem and Katya)
- Ivan Shmakov – Artyom Isaev (son of Artem and Katya) (5 years old)
- Alexandra Parveva – Dasha (daughter of Sauna and Alisa)
- Natalia Parieva – Masha (daughter of Sauna and Alisa)
- Agnessa Yudintseva – Dasha (daughter of Sauna and Alisa) (5 years old)
- Veronica Yudintseva – Masha (daughter of Sauna and Alisa) (5 years old)
- Andrey Fandeev – Dima (son of Igor and Nastya)
- Philipp Kirkorov – Saint Valentine
- Sharon Stone – Angela Blake
- Olga Mokshina – Kristina Arturovna
- Veronika Vernadskaya – Tanya
- Igor Jijikine – Oleg Trub
- Ekaterina Klimova – Anna
- Oleg Klenov – security guard of the oligarch
- Mikhail Salin – the captain of the police
- Dmitry Mikhaylik – security guard of the oligarch
- Yevhen Koshovyi – Nikolaychuk (worker for the security agency "Shield and Sword")

== Production ==
The filming of the comedy commenced in 2012, initially in Las Vegas, then shifting to Moscow. Originally, Sharon Stone was to play herself in the plot. She had the idea of including the image of an eccentric rock star who should speak the part with a British accent, as was a trend at the time.

The preceding films of this trilogy are Love in the Big City and Love in the Big City 2.
