= Biologiya =

Studio album by Nu Virgos
- Released: 12 November 2003
- Recorded: 2003
- Genres: Dance-pop; pop rock; teen pop
- Language: Russian
- Labels: Sony Music; CD Land
- Producers: Konstantin Meladze; Dmytro Kostyuk

Nu Virgos chronology
Stop! Snyato! (2003)	Biologiya (2003)	Stop! Stop! Stop! (2004)

Singles from Biologiya
- 1. "Okean i tri reki" Released: August 2003; 2. "Biologiya" Released: July 2004; 3. "Mir, o kotorom ya ne znala do tebya" Released: November 2004

Biologiya (Russian: Биология, lit. 'Biology') is the third studio album by the Ukrainian girl group Nu Virgos.

== Track listing ==
All tracks are written by Konstantin Meladze.

Original 2003 release
No.	Title	Length
1.	"Biologiya" (Russian: Биология, lit. 'Biology')	3:46
2.	"Okean i tri reki (featuring Valery Meladze)" (Russian: Океан и три реки, lit. 'Ocean and three rivers')	3:40
3.	"Mir, o kotorom ya ne znala do tebya" (Russian: Мир, о котором я не знала до тебя, lit. 'The world that I did not know before you')	3:58
4.	"Ne nado" (Russian: Не надо, lit. 'Don't do it')	3:00
5.	"V etom ty professor" (Russian: В этом ты профессор, lit. 'You are a professor in that')	3:57
6.	"Producer" (Russian: Продюсер, lit. 'Producer')	4:04
7.	"Biologiya" (club mix)	3:11
8.	"Biologiya" (jungle mix)	3:29
9.	"Ne nado" (Latin mix)	3:00
10.	"Ne nado" (dance mix)	3:33
11.	"Vot taki dela (version of the song "Ya ne ponyala")" (Russian: Вот таки дела (версия песни "Я не поняла"), lit. 'This is the situation')	3:38
12.	"Stop! Stop! Stop!" (upbeat version)	3:51
13.	"Stop! Stop! Stop!" (R&B version)	3:52

== Vocals ==
- Anna Sedokova
- Nadezhda Granovskaya
- Vera Brezhneva

== Release history ==
Country	Release date
Israel	12 November 2003
Russia	12 November 2003
Ukraine	12 November 2003

== Certifications ==
Country	Certification
Russia	Gold
