= Naughty Grandma =

2017 film by Maryus Vaysberg

- Theatrical release poster
- Directed by: Maryus Vaysberg
- Written by: Saeed Davdiyev; Evgeniy Shelyakin; Maryus Vaysberg; Aleksandr Revva
- Produced by: Maryus Vaysberg; Aleksandr Revva
- Starring: Aleksandr Revva; Glukoza
- Cinematography: Bruce Allan Green
- Music by: Bryan Carr
- Production company: Vice Films
- Release date: August 17, 2017
- Running time: 86 minutes
- Country: Russia
- Language: Russian
- Box office: $5,856,287

Naughty Grandma (Russian: Бабушка лёгкого поведения, romanized: Babushka lyogkogo povedeniya) is a 2017 Russian comedy film directed by Maryus Vaysberg. It stars Aleksandr Revva and Glukoza. The film was the only domestic picture to be successful at the Russian box-office in the summer of 2017.

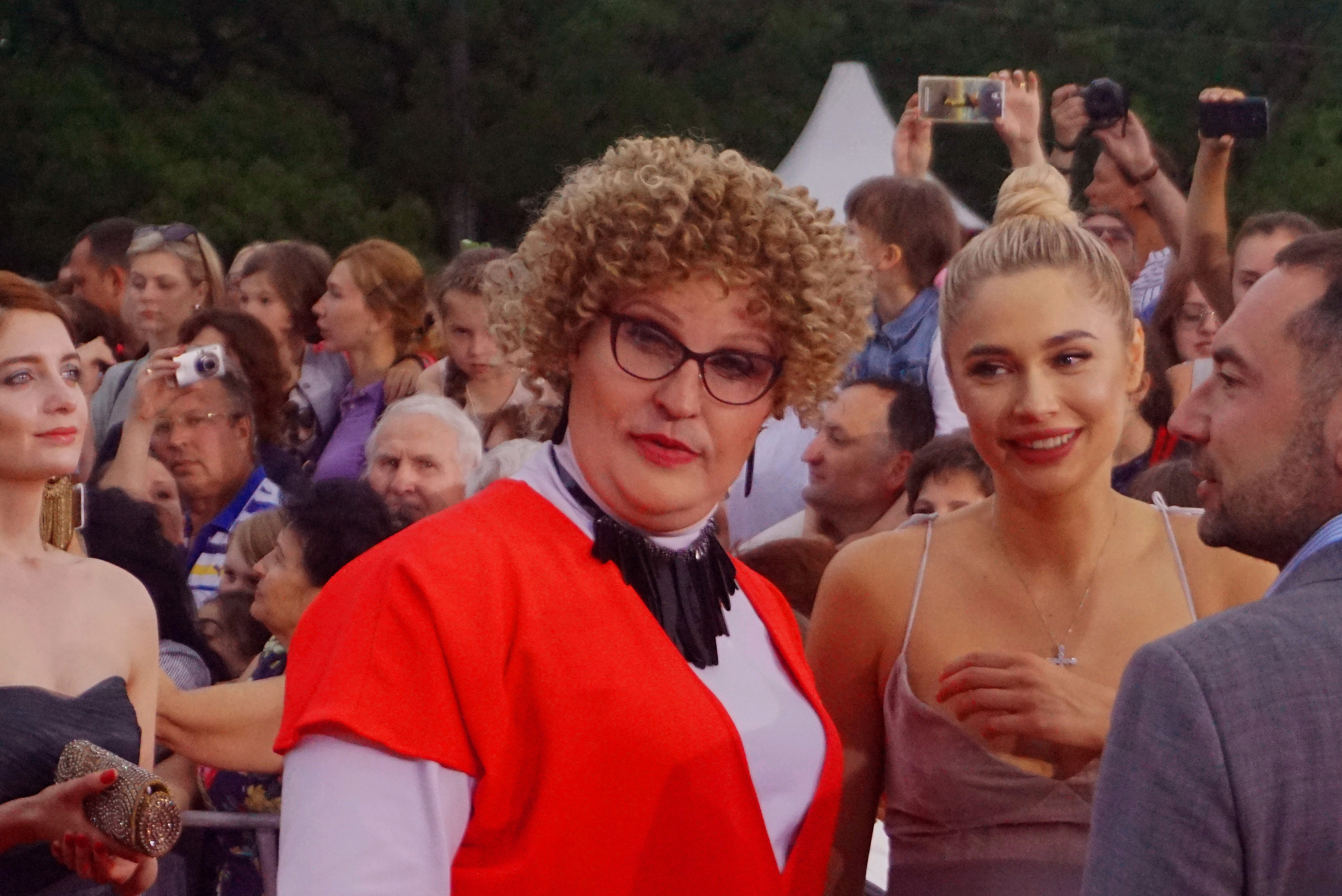
Aleksandr Revva at the Kinotavr in 2017

== Plot ==
Aleksandr Rubenstein (Sanya), nicknamed the Transformer, has the talent of impersonating various people. He uses this skill for criminal purposes. After another successful case, Sanya is forced to hide from his pursuers in his uncle's nursing home, posing as a grandmother. There he meets a girl, Lyuba, and falls in love, but a grandfather from the nursing home unexpectedly falls in love with him.

== Cast ==
- Aleksandr Revva - Aleksandr Rubenstein (Sanya) / Aleksandra Pavlovna Fishman
- Glukoza - Lyuba
- Evgeniy Gerchakov - Uncle
- Vladimir Tolokonnikov - Bessonov
- Marina Fedunkiv - Nurse Tonya
- Natalia Bardo - Accomplice Aleksandra Viktoria
- Yelena Valyushkina - Head
- Yola Sanko - Amnesiac
- Svetlana Sukhanova - Masha
- Lyubov Revva - Aunt Raya
- Daniil Fyodorov - Artist
- Aleksandr Lyrchikov - Lavryonov
- Elena Rubina - Pelageya
- Gamlet Petrosyan - Gamlet
- Gennadiy Makoyev - Colonel Kulagin
- Nina Slavnova - Pelageya
- Nikolai Ivanov - Oligarchs assistant
- Philipp Kirkorov - Himself (cameo)

== Production ==
The idea of the film belongs to Aleksandr Revva. About twenty stuntmen were involved in the making of the film. The makeup for Aleksandr Revva's grandmother character took 4 hours daily to apply.

== Reception ==
The film received generally negative reviews in Russian media.
