= Nobody Knows About Sex =

2006 film by Aleksey Gordeev

- Directed by: Aleksey Gordeev
- Screenplay by: Denis Rodimin
- Produced by: Sergey Danielyan; Yuri Moroz; Aram Movsesyan; Ruben Dishdishyan; Sabina Eremeeva
- Starring: Nikolay Machulsky; Aurora; Anatoly Kuznetsov
- Cinematography: Oleg Lukichev
- Edited by: Dasha Danilova
- Music by: Ilya Shipilov
- Production company: Central Partnership
- Release date: 27 July 2006 (Russia)
- Running time: 95 minutes
- Country: Russia
- Language: Russian
- Budget: $1,100,000
- Box office: $1,633,500

Nobody Knows About Sex (Russian: Никто не знает про секс, romanized: Nikto ne znaet pro seks) is a 2006 Russian comedy film directed by Aleksey Gordeev. Working title of the film was No One Knows About It. In 2008 a sequel was released Nobody Knows About Sex 2: No Sex starring Ksenia Sobchak.

== Plot ==
Throughout his life Egor lived in a remote taiga. All his knowledge of the world, he learned from the stories of his only relative - old grandfather-hunter. Once Egor accidentally meets TV presenter Angelina, he falls in love and decides to marry her, and so he goes to Moscow. However, he finds it difficult to get used to the pace of metropolitan life.

== Cast ==
- Nikolay Machulsky as Egor
- VJ Aurora as Angelina
- Anatoly Kuznetsov as Grandpa
- Kirill Kanahin as Kesha
- Elena Yakovleva as Kesha's mother
- Mikhail Yefremov as Kesha's dad
- Aleksandr Bashirov as Stasik
- Anastasia Zadorozhnaya as Nika
- Andrey Kaykov as Alik
- Maria Gonchar as Anna

== Release and criticism ==
Gordeev's film was generally negatively assessed by both professional critics and ordinary viewers in Russia.
