= Driven to Kill =

- Official movie poster
- Directed by: Jeff F. King
- Written by: Mark James
- Produced by: Kirk Shaw
- Starring: Steven Seagal; Mike Dopud; Igor Jijikine; Robert Wisden; Inna Korobkina; Zak Santiago; Alexander Rafalski
- Cinematography: Thomas M. Harting
- Edited by: Jamie Alain
- Music by: Peter Allen
- Distributed by: 20th Century Fox Home Entertainment
- Release date: May 19, 2009
- Running time: 98 minutes
- Countries: United States; Canada
- Languages: English; Russian
- Budget: $10 million

Driven to Kill is a 2009 American-Canadian action film directed by Jeff F. King, starring Steven Seagal, Mike Dopud, Igor Jijikine and Robert Wisden. The film was released direct-to-DVD in the United States on May 19, 2009.

The plot line follows the footsteps of Ruslan Drachev pursuing the revenge of his daughter's sabotaged wedding plans to a family member of the Russian mob. His daughter survives the sabotage effort though gravely hospitalized, and her mother, Ruslan's ex-wife, is killed in the sabotage effort to derail the wedding.

== Plot ==
Ruslan Drachev (Steven Seagal) is a former Russian mobster and a current writer of hardboiled pulp fiction novels living in California when he gets a call from his ex-wife Catherine (Inna Korobkina) that his daughter Lanie (Laura Mennell) is getting married. Not wanting to miss the wedding, Ruslan catches the red eye to New Jersey and heads into Trenton to see Lanie, who is an attorney in the D.A.'s office in Trenton. Ruslan is somewhat concerned that Lanie is marrying Stephan Abramov (Dmitry Chepovetsky), the son of Mikhail Abramov (Igor Jijikine), the brutal boss of the local Russian mob outfit.

Later on, Ruslan finds that Catherine is now married to wealthy local defense attorney Terry Goldstein (Robert Wisden). Lanie tells Ruslan that Terry is a jerk. Ruslan pulls Stephan to the side, and Stephan assures Ruslan that he has no interest in joining the family business and just wants to love his new wife and start a new life. After everyone but Catherine and Lanie leaves to go to the church where the wedding will take place, a pair of men break in, stab Catherine to death, and then stab Lanie, leaving her in critical condition.

Detective Norden (Ingrid Torrance) and Detective Lavastic (Zak Santiago) are heading the investigation. It was made to look like a robbery, but Ruslan knows full well that it was not a robbery. At East Lawn Hospital, Dr. Brown (Linda Minard) tells Ruslan that she expects Lanie to recover. Ruslan starts his own investigation and learns that Mikhail, who hates Ruslan, was behind the attack. Terry, who is Mikhail's attorney, is also in on it. Mikhail despised the thought of Stephan marrying a prosecuting attorney instead of following in Mikhail's footsteps, and Catherine was about to blow the whistle on some of Terry's corrupt activities. However, Ruslan is willing to do whatever it takes to make Mikhail and Terry pay for what they did.

When the Russian mob finds out that Ruslan's daughter is in the hospital still alive, they plan to complete their original plan to do away with her, and now plan to finish off Ruslan at the same time. They descend upon the hospital disguised as a police squad and discover that Ruslan has relocated his recovering daughter to another part of the hospital while laying an ambush for the mob in her old hospital room where they expected to find her. Ruslan uses surprise to dispatch most of them using automatic weapons and grenades to assist him. He finally has a showdown with the mob leader who after a brief fight is killed by Ruslan. Ruslan then finds his recovering daughter in the other part of the hospital along with her intended fiance and gives his blessings that they get married and start a family.

== Cast ==
- Steven Seagal as Ruslan Drachev
- Mike Dopud as Boris
- Igor Jijikine as Mikhail Abramov
- Robert Wisden as Terry Goldstein
- Inna Korobkina as Catherine Goldstein
- Zak Santiago as Detective Lavastic
- Alexander Rafalski as Alex
- Yevgeni Lazarev as The Bartender
- Laura Mennell as Lanie Drachev
- Aleks Paunovic as Tony Links
- Ingrid Torrance as Detective Norden
- Sergei Nasibov as Ilya
- Dmitry Chepovetsky as Stephan Abramov
- Crystal Lowe as Tanya
- Daniel Cudmore as Young Guy
- Gerry South as Taxi Driver
- Holly Eglington as Regime
- Dan Payne as Sergei
- Reg Tupper as Pawn Shop Owner
- Linda Minard as Doctor

== Production ==
It is set and filmed at Lower Mainland, B.C., including the beach in White Rock, on May 12 and June 16, 2008.

== Home media ==
On May 19, 2009, DVD and Blu-ray was released by 20th Century Fox Home Entertainment in the United States in Region 1. On 13 July 2009, DVD and Blu-ray was released by Optimum Home Entertainment in the United Kingdom in Region 2.

== Soundtrack ==
- "Shooshino" (David Steele)
- "Something Right" (David Steele)
- "Bulch Blues" (Butch Jularbal Socan)
- "One of Them Days" (Loverboy)
- "Alien Smegma" (David Steele)
- "Island Bound" (Steve Hilliam)
