= Evgenia Vlasova =

Ukrainian singer (born 1978)

- Євгенія Власова; Евгения Власова
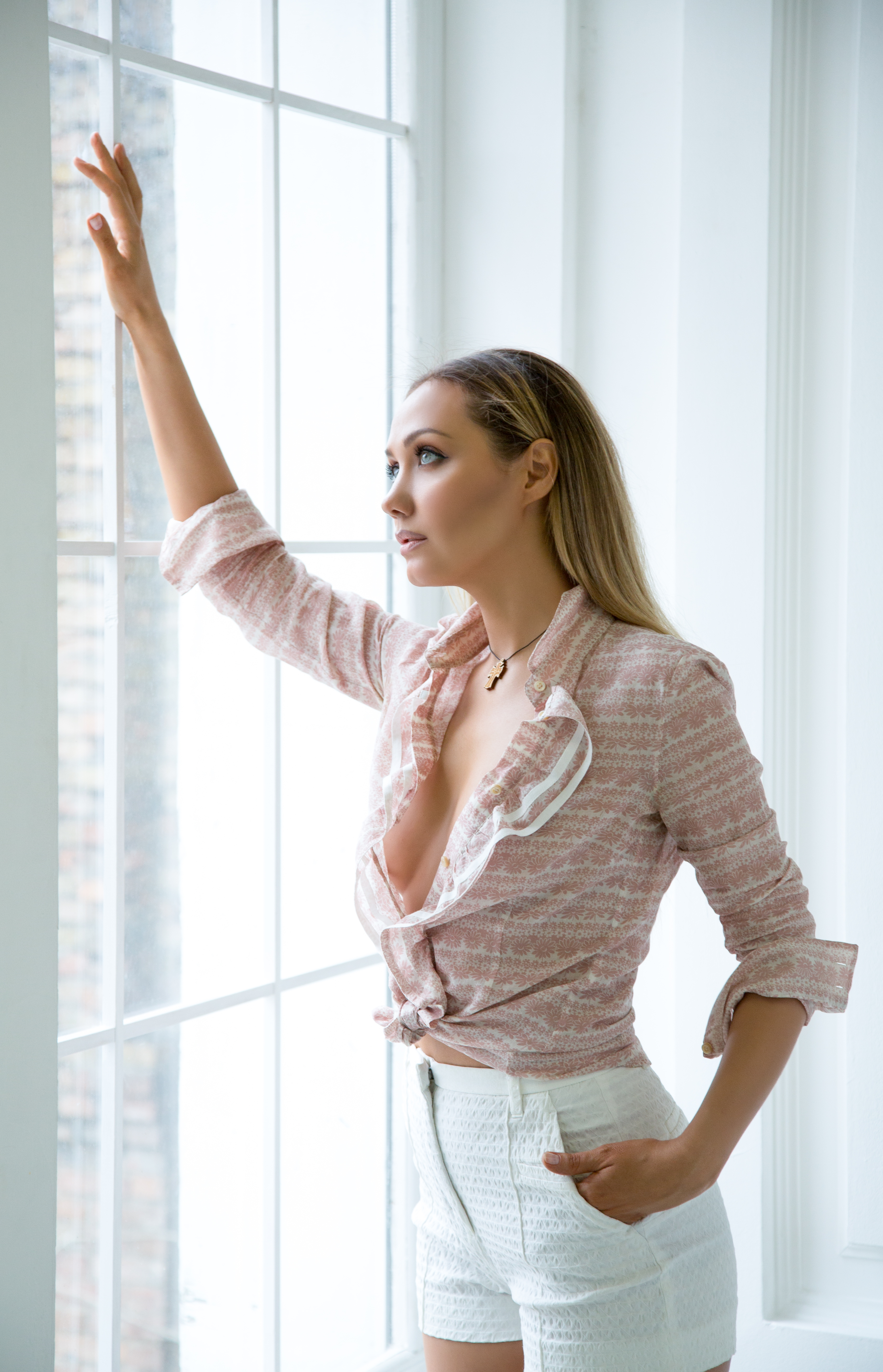
- Vlasova in 2018
- Born: Yevheniia Oleksandrivna Vlasova; 8 April 1978 (age 48); Kyiv, Ukrainian SSR, Soviet Union
- Other name: Eugenia Vlasova
- Education: R. Glier Kyiv Institute of Music
- Occupations: Singer; songwriter; model
- Years active: 1998–present
- Spouse: Dmytro Kostyuk (m. 2004; div. 2008)
- Children: 1
- Musical career
- Genres: Pop; folk
- Instruments: Vocals
- Labels: Comp Music; EMI; Nina Music

Yevheniia Oleksandrivna Vlasova (Note: In this name that follows East Slavic naming customs, the patronymic is Oleksandrivna and the family name is Vlasova.) (Ukrainian: Євгенія Олександрівна Власова; born 8 April 1978), more commonly known as Evgenia Vlasova (Russian: Евгения Власова), is a Ukrainian singer-songwriter.

== Early life ==
Yevheniia Oleksandrivna Vlasova was born on 8 April 1978 in Kyiv to an actress mother and a father who sang in the Levko Revutskyi Men's Choir Chapel. Her father left the family when she was young. She developed an interest in music as a child and secretly joined the children's choir Sonechko without her mother's knowledge, eventually becoming a soloist. In 1994, she began studying at the R. Glier Kyiv Institute of Music, graduating in 1998. During that period, she began participating in music competitions and festivals. She was a laureate of the 1996 edition of Pisennyy vernisazh and participated in the 1997 and 1998 editions of Pesnya goda. Also in 1998, she represented Ukraine at the international competition Regina della Canzone in Rimini, Italy, and won the Grand Prix.

== Career ==
In 1999, Vlasova met Dmytro Kostyuk, who became her producer. She released her Russian-language debut single "Veter nadezhdy" (Ветер надежды; Wind of Hope) the following year. It was commercially successful and is considered her signature song. Her debut studio album of the same name was released in November 2001, selling over 100,000 copies. It spawned several other successful singles, including "Ya — zhivaya reka" (Я — живая река; I Am a Living River) and "O tebe" (О тебе; About You). Her second studio album, the English-language Wind of Hope (2006), was recorded in collaboration with Jamaican musician Andru Donalds. She participated in the Ukrainian national selection for the Eurovision Song Contest 2007 with the song "I Will Be", which was also released in Russian under the title "Ya budu"; she finished second behind Verka Serduchka. She returned to Russian for her third studio album Sinergia (Синергия; Synergy), which was released in 2008.

From 2008 to 2010, Vlasova was the face of the brand Julia Aysina. In May 2010, she opened a singing school. In 2016, she announced that she would take a "creative break". She made her first television appearance in a decade on Holos Krainy in 2021 with a contestant who performed her songs, though she stated that she did not want to return to show business. Later that year, she participated in the ninth season of Tantsi z zirkamy. She was eighth to be eliminated. She returned from her hiatus in 2024.

== Personal life ==
Vlasova married Dmytro Kostyuk in 2004, the year their daughter was born. Vlasova said that they separated after five months of marriage; they divorced in 2008.

=== Health ===
In 2009, Vlasova underwent surgery and chemotherapy. At the time, it was reported that she had cancer. However, in 2019, she wrote on her Instagram account that she never had cancer and that the chemotherapy was a preventive measure.

== Discography ==
=== Albums ===
Title	Details	Track listing
Veter nadezhdy (Russian: Ветер надежды, lit. 'Wind of hope')	Released: 2001; Label: Comp Music	No. / Title / Length; 1. / "Ya — zhyvaya reka" (Russian: Я — живая река, lit. 'I am a living river') / 3:50; 2. / "Son" (Russian: Сон, lit. 'Dream') / 3:33; 3. / "Zima" (Russian: Зима, lit. 'Winter') / 4:20; 4. / "Narisuyu" (Russian: Нарисую, lit. 'I will draw') / 2:51; 5. / "O tebe" (Russian: О тебе, lit. 'About you') / 4:10; 6. / "Disko" (Russian: Диско, lit. 'Disco') / 4:19; 7. / "Veter nadezhdy" (Russian: Ветер надежды, lit. 'Wind of hope') / 4:02; 8. / "Tam, gde lubov'" (Russian: Там, где любовь, lit. 'There where love is') / 3:36; 9. / "Severnoe siyanie" (Russian: Северное сияние, lit. 'Northern lights') / 3:54; 10. / "Krasnoe solntse" (Russian: Красное солнце, lit. 'Black sun') / 3:31; 11. / "Ne zabuvay!" (Ukrainian: Не забувай!, lit. 'Don't forget!') / 4:54; Total length: / / 42:42
Wind of Hope	Released: 2006; Label: EMI	No. / Title / Length; 1. / "Cry in the Night" / 3:31; 2. / "My Wonderland" / 3:21; 3. / "Love Is a Crazy Game" (with Andru Donalds) / 3:26; 4. / "Only You" / 4:27; 5. / "Limbo" (with Andru Donalds) / 3:33; 6. / "River of Life" / 4:20; 7. / "One Night Lover" (with Andru Donalds) / 3:30; 8. / "Northern Lights" / 3:10; 9. / "Gonna Be Stronger" / 4:15; 10. / "Wind of Hope" (with Andru Donalds) / 3:48; 11. / "Limbo" (with Andru Donalds; remix) / 3:14; Total length: / / 40:42
Sinergia (Russian: Синергия, lit. 'Synergy')	Released: 2008; Label: Comp Music; Nina Music	No. / Title / Length; 1. / "Na krayu nebes" (Russian: На краю небес, lit. 'At the edge of the heavens') / 5:33; 2. / "Na dvoikh serdtse odno" (Russian: На двоих сердце одно, lit. 'Two hearts as one') / 3:14; 3. / "Lavina lyubvi" (Russian: Лавина любви, lit. 'Avalanche of love') / 3:49; 4. / "Net, ya ne boyus'!" (Russian: Нет, я не боюсь!, lit. 'No, I'm not afraid!') / 3:41; 5. / "Otnosheniya" (Russian: Отношения, lit. 'Relationships') / 3:31; 6. / "Poletim v nebo" (Russian: Полетим в небо, lit. 'Fly to the sky') / 4:14; 7. / "V kazhdom bienii" (Russian: В каждом биении, lit. 'In every beat') / 4:04; 8. / "Planeta nomer dva" (Russian: Планета №2, lit. 'Planet number two') / 3:33; 9. / "Serdtse" (Russian: Сердце, lit. 'Heart') / 4:23; 10. / "Ubegayu" (Russian: Убегаю, lit. 'I'm running away') / 3:13; 11. / "Show Time" / 3:10; 12. / "Show Time" (remix) / 3:25; Total length: / / 45:50
