= Aras Agalarov =

Russian businessman (born 1955)

- Araz Ağalarov
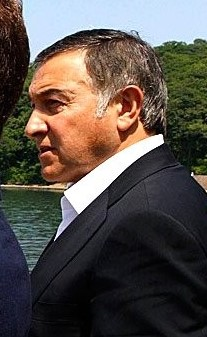
- Ağalarov in 2011
- Born: 8 November 1955 (age 70); Baku, Azerbaijani SSR, Soviet Union
- Citizenship: Soviet Union; Russian
- Education: Azerbaijan Polytechnical Institute
- Occupations: businessman, developer
- Children: 2, including Emin
- Awards: Order of Honour; Order of Merit of the Italian Republic (Commander)
- Aras Agalarov's voice Aras Agalarov on the Echo of Moscow program, 4 November 2013

Aras Iskanderovich Agalarov (Azerbaijani: Araz İsgəndər oğlu Ağalarov; Russian: Араз Искандерович Агаларов; born 8 November 1955) is an Azerbaijani-Russian billionaire and real estate developer. He was listed by Forbes as the 51st richest Russian in 2015, and several sources have described him as a Russian oligarch.

== Early life ==
Born in Baku, Agalarov was educated at the Azerbaijan Polytechnical Institute, where he studied computer engineering. He was a member of the Communist Party of Azerbaijan and served on the Baku City Committee.

== Scientific and Creative Activity ==
Agalarov holds the degree of Candidate of Economic Sciences. In 1998, he defended a dissertation entitled "Formation and Use of the Wage Fund, Using a Communications Enterprise as an Example".

He has been an Honorary Member of the Russian Academy of Arts since 2015.

He is the author of My View of Russia in the Era of Reforms (1998), Russia: Reflections on the Path to the Market, and Another Attempt?... Articles on the Russian Economy Published in 1996–1999.

In January 2020, Agalarov criticised the state of the Russian economy, stating: "GDP cannot grow in Russia with such low wages and pensions and such high taxes".

== Career ==
Agalarov subsequently opened the first Crocus Inter store, which grew into a retail business encompassing a chain of malls specialising in homewares. This venture led him into property development, and he went on to build the Crocus City Mall, the largest shopping centre in Moscow. Adjacent to it, he later constructed Crocus Expo, the largest trade centre in Russia, on the outskirts of the capital, and subsequently developed a luxury housing project. He has also partnered with Robert De Niro in the two Moscow restaurants of Nobu Matsuhisa.

In 2012, the Crocus Group constructed a new campus for the Far Eastern Federal University outside Vladivostok. Agalarov has stated that he was obliged to purchase a larger Gulfstream jet to visit the site, where he spent $100 million of his own funds to cover cost overruns on the $1.2 billion project, which comprised 70 new buildings on Russky Island overlooking the Pacific Ocean. He subsequently secured contracts for a Moscow superhighway and two stadiums for the 2018 FIFA World Cup.

In January 2013, Agalarov and his son travelled to Las Vegas, Nevada, after Donald Trump, the owner of the beauty pageant, announced at Miss Universe 2012 that the next competition would be hosted by Agalarov in Moscow. Agalarov paid Trump $20 million to stage the event. In November 2013, President Vladimir Putin awarded him the Russian Order of Honour. That same month, Agalarov hosted Miss Universe 2013 at his Crocus City Hall. Agalarov's wife served as a judge on the panel, while his son performed at the event.

On the night of the pageant, Herman Gref, the head of Sberbank of Russia, together with Agalarov and his son, hosted a dinner for Trump. While in Moscow, Trump and Phil Ruffin, a partner in Trump International Hotel Las Vegas, met with Agalarov and his son at the Ritz-Carlton. Trump subsequently appeared in a music video with Agalarov's son, alongside a number of the pageant contestants. Trump and Agalarov also planned a $3 billion development, with the state-owned Sberbank agreeing to provide 70 per cent of the financing.

Agalarov has acted as an intermediary between Trump and Putin. In an interview, Agalarov disclosed that they had once discussed the construction of a Trump Tower in Russia. He had also reportedly attempted to arrange a meeting between the two men, but it was cancelled after Putin was obliged to receive the Dutch royal couple at the same time. Putin instead sent Trump a fedoskino miniature.

In 2014, Kyrgyzstan signed a treaty with Russia that designated the Crocus Group as the sole supplier of services for integration into the Eurasian Economic Union, thereby avoiding the need for competitive bidding on the $127 million contract.

Agalarov's son, Emin, helped to arrange the meeting between the Russian lawyer Natalia Veselnitskaya and Donald Trump Jr., Jared Kushner and Paul Manafort at Trump Tower on 9 June 2016. After the meeting, Agalarov transferred $1.2 million to a New Jersey bank account controlled by Emin, a transaction that has been the subject of investigation by American law enforcement.

Emin has stated that, after Trump won the United States presidential election in 2016, Trump sent them a handwritten note, saying that he does not forget his friends.

As of June 2017, Agalarov had an estimated net worth of US$1.91 billion, most of which was derived from his real estate ventures. In January 2017, Forbes listed him as the 51st richest Russian.

== Personal life ==
Agalarov was married to Irina Agalarova, with whom he has two children. His son, Emin Agalarov, is a businessman and singer-songwriter. Emin was married to Leyla Aliyeva, the daughter of Ilham Aliyev, the President of Azerbaijan, until their divorce in May 2015. From his son's marriage, Agalarov has twin grandsons. In July 2017, he put his mansion in Alpine, New Jersey, on the market for $7 million. The property eventually sold in November 2017 for $5.8 million. In March 2026, Agalarov divorced his wife Irina and married his mistress, Alena, who is 43 years his junior.
