= Ukrainian Agency of Copyright and Related Rights =

Music licensing organization of Ukraine

- Українське агентство з авторських та суміжних прав
- Abbreviation: UACRR
- Type: Collective management organization
- Location: Kyiv, Ukraine
- Website: uacrr.org.ua

Ukrainian Agency of Copyright and Related Rights (UACRR) is a collective rights management organization in Ukraine. UACRR administers public performance rights, mechanical recording and reproduction rights, and dramatic rights.
