= Stop! Snyato! =

Studio album by Nu Virgos
- Released: 14 April 2003
- Recorded: 2002–2003
- Genres: Dance-pop; pop rock; teen pop
- Language: Russian
- Labels: Sony Music; CD Land
- Producers: Konstantin Meladze; Dmytro Kostyuk

Nu Virgos chronology
Popytka No. 5 (2001)	Stop! Snyato! (2003)	Biologiya (2003)

Singles from Stop! Snyato!
- 1. "Stop! Stop! Stop!" Released: April 2002; 2. "Good morning, papa!" Released: September 2002; 3. "Ne ostavlyay menya, lyubimyy!" Released: February 2003; 4. "Ubey moyu podrugu" Released: April 2003

Stop! Snyato! (Russian: Стоп! Снято!, lit. 'Stop! Cut!') is the second studio album by the Ukrainian girl group Nu Virgos.

== Track listing ==
All tracks are written by Konstantin Meladze.

Original 2003 release
No.	Title	Length
1.	"Stop! Stop! Stop!" (Russian: Стоп! Стоп! Стоп!, lit. 'Stop! Stop! Stop!')	3:46
2.	"Good morning, papa!" (Russian: Good morning, папа!, lit. 'Good morning, daddy!')	3:37
3.	"Ubey moyu podrugu" (Russian: Убей мою подругу, lit. 'Kill my girlfriend')	3:44
4.	"Ne ostavlyay menya, lyubimyy!" (Russian: Не оставляй меня, любимый!, lit. 'Don't ever leave me, my love!')	3:32
5.	"Ya ne ponyala" (Russian: Я не поняла, lit. 'I didn't understand')	3:42
6.	"Stop! Stop! Stop!" (disco house mix by YaD)	4:10
7.	"Good morning, papa!" (strong mix by RainMan)	3:45
8.	"Stop! Stop! Stop!" (Latino mix by YaD)	3:57
9.	"Ne ostavlyay menya, lyubimyy!" (etno-easy mix by RainMan)	3:45
10.	"Good morning, papa!" (ING mix by RainMan)	3:23
11.	"Stop! Stop! Stop!" (chrystal pop mix by Master J)	5:00
12.	"Ne ostavlyay menya, lyubimyy!" (space mix by RainMan)	3:48

== Vocals ==
- Anna Sedokova
- Nadezhda Granovskaya
- Vera Brezhneva

== Videos ==
- "Stop! Stop! Stop!" (2002)
- "Good morning, papa!" (2003)
- "Ne ostavlyay menya, lyubimyy!" (2003)
- "Ubey moyu podrugu" (2003)

== Release history ==
Country	Release date
Israel	14 April 2003
Russia	14 April 2003
Ukraine	14 April 2003

== Certifications ==
Country	Certification
Russia	Gold
