= Dnipro Medical Institute of Conventional and Alternative Medicine =

Medical college in Dnipro, Ukraine

Dnipro Medical Institute of Traditional and Nontraditional Medicine
- Дніпровський медичний інститут традиційної і нетрадиційної медицини
- Type: Private medical school
- Established: 1993
- President: Viktor V. Abramov
- Rector: Serhii V. Abramov
- Dean: Irina A. Pysarevska
- Location: Dnipro, 49005, Ukraine; 48.44504°N 35.05705°E
- Campus: Urban
- Language: English and Ukrainian
- Website: dnipromedicalinstitute.com

The Dnipro Medical Institute of Traditional and Nontraditional Medicine (Ukrainian: Дніпровський медичний інститут традиційної і нетрадиційної медицини) is a private University in Dnipro, Ukraine.

== Overview ==
Dnipro Medical Institute of Conventional and Alternative Medicine, also known as Dnipro Medical Institute of Traditional and Non-Traditional Medicine (or in Ukrainian Dnepropetrovskij Medicinskij Institute) offers Medicine and Dentistry courses in English for international students.
