= Dmytro Kostyuk =

Ukrainian music and television producer (born 1965)

- Дмитро Костюк
- Born: Dmytro Dmytrovych Kostyuk; 10 April 1965 (age 61); Vorozhba, Ukrainian SSR, Soviet Union
- Education: Dnipro Medical Institute of Conventional and Alternative Medicine
- Occupations: Music producer; television producer
- Years active: 1995–present
- Spouse: Evgenia Vlasova (m. 2004; div. 2008)
- Children: 2

Dmytro Dmytrovych Kostyuk (Note: In this name that follows East Slavic naming customs, the patronymic is Dmytrovych and the family name is Kostyuk.; Ukrainian: Дмитро Дмитрович Костюк, pronounced [dmɪˈtrɔ ˈdmɪtrowɪtʃ koˈsʲtʲuk]; Russian: Дмитрий Дмитриевич Костюк, romanised: Dmitriy Dmitrievich Kostyuk; English-language sources commonly transliterate his last name as Kostyuk, including the Ukrainian Agency of Copyright and Related Rights during his tenure.) (born 10 April 1965) is a Ukrainian music and television producer. He is best known for co-founding the girl group Nu Virgos with songwriter and producer Konstantin Meladze in 2000. He was also general producer for the Ukrainian music television channel BIZ-TV, which he co-founded, from 1995 to 2016, and the acting general director of the Ukrainian Agency of Copyright and Related Rights from 2015 to 2018.

== Early life ==
Dmytro Dmytrovych Kostyuk was born on 10 April 1965 in Vorozhba. His family moved to Hornostaivka when he was young. He later relocated to Dnipro, where he graduated from the Dnipro Medical Institute of Conventional and Alternative Medicine with a degree in dentistry, though he never practised. His interest in music began in childhood and, while in medical school, he was part of a band as a vocalist and guitarist.

== Career ==
In 1989, Kostyuk became the producer of the Dnipro-based rock band TOK. They parted ways in the early 1990s. In 1995, a Ukrainian subsidiary of the Russian music television channel BIZ-TV was established with Kostyuk as a founder and producer. While the Russian version became MTV Russia in 1998, the Ukrainian version continued to operate under its original name. BIZ-TV produced music programmes for the Ukrainian channels Inter, STB, and TET before getting a broadcasting licence in 2007. It was renamed to Peopleair TV in 2013 and ceased broadcast in 2016.

In 1999, Kostyuk met the Ukrainian singer Evgenia Vlasova and became her producer. She achieved commercial success in Ukraine and Russia in the first half of the 2000s, following which their professional and personal relationship ended. In 2000, Kostyuk co-founded the girl group VIA Gra with the songwriter and producer Konstantin Meladze. He has stated on multiple occasions that he came up with the name. The group was renamed to Nu Virgos for international markets by Sony Music to avoid a trademark conflict with Pfizer over the drug Viagra, but retained its original name in Ukraine and neighbouring countries. Initially a duo consisting of Alena Vinnitskaya and Nadezhda Granovskaya, Nu Virgos was expanded to a trio by 2002. This became the standard lineup style, which followed a hair colour scheme of "brunette, blonde, and redhead" credited to Kostyuk. He was also responsible for the stage names of multiple members, including Granovskaya and Vera Brezhneva. Marked by frequent lineup changes, Nu Virgos became primarily associated with Meladze, who wrote the songs. The group achieved commercial success in Ukraine and Russia as well as internationally during the 2000s. Kostyuk exited the project in March 2011 following a conflict with Meladze. In 2013, Meladze launched a television show to find a new lineup for the group, while Kostyuk established his own girl group also named VIA Gra. This prompted a legal battle between the two starting in March 2013 over the rights to the VIA Gra trademark. Rulings were rendered in Meladze's favour in April 2014 and December 2015. Kostyuk's VIA Gra failed to develop and disbanded in 2014.

Kostyuk became the acting general director of the Ukrainian Agency of Copyright and Related Rights (UACRR) on 15 October 2015. During his tenure, he focused on copyright reform and tackling corruption; he described the latter as his core mission. Between 2017 and 2018, he was a guest writer for The New Voice of Ukraine. The Ministry of Economy of Ukraine dismissed him from the UACRR effective 30 July 2018 amidst the privatisation of the agency, citing "multiple and serious violations" from several officials.

== Personal life ==
Kostyuk has a son from his first marriage. He married Evgenia Vlasova in 2004, the year their daughter was born. Vlasova said that they separated after five months of marriage; they divorced in 2008.
