= Maryus Vaysberg =

Russian film director, producer and screenwriter

- Марюс Вайсберг
- Born: Maryus Erikovich Vaysberg; April 1, 1971 (age 55); Moscow, Russian SFSR, Soviet Union
- Other name: Marius Balčiūnas-Weisberg
- Citizenship: Soviet Union; Russia
- Occupations: film director, film producer, screenwriter
- Years active: 1999–present

Maryus Erikovich Vaysberg (Russian: Марюс Эрикович Вайсберг, born 1 April 1971), also known as Marius Balčiūnas-Weisberg, is a Russian film director, producer, and screenwriter of Lithuanian and Jewish descent.

== Career ==
His father, Erik Vaysberg, had had his own career in the Soviet film industry- he acted as the executive producer of Tarkovsky's film Mirror, on Andrei Konchalovsky's film Siberiade, and Karen Shakhnazarov's film The Assassin of the Tsar.

Vaysberg graduated from the VGIK in the mid-1990s and started releasing films. His first film, No Vacancy, starring Christina Ricci was released in 1999.

Vaysberg's films are not well-loved by critics in his native Russia. However, many of his films are successful at the Russian box office, such as Naughty Grandma, Love in the Big City, 8 First Dates, and Not Ideal Man.

== Filmography ==
Year	Film	Director	Writer	Producer	Notes
1999	No Vacancy	Yes	Yes		
2002	May			Yes	
2006	The Elder Son	Yes	Yes		
2008	Hitler Goes Kaput!	Yes	Yes		
2009	Love in the Big City	Yes	Yes		
2010	Love in the Big City 2	Yes	Yes	Yes	
2012	8 First Dates			Yes	
2012	Rzhevsky versus Napoleon	Yes			
2014	Love in the Big City 3	Yes	Yes		
2015	8 New Dates	Yes		Yes	
2016	8 Best Dates	Yes			
2017	Naughty Grandma	Yes	Yes	Yes	
2018	Night Shift	Yes	Yes	Yes	
2019	Naughty Grandma 2	Yes	Yes	Yes	
2020	Not Ideal Man	Yes		Yes	
2021	Naughty Great Grandma	Yes	Yes	Yes	
2022	About Fate	Yes			
2023	Uvolit Zhoru	Yes	Yes	Yes	
