= Brillianty =

Compilation album by Nu Virgos
- Released: December 12, 2005
- Recorded: 2000–2005
- Genres: Dance-pop, pop rock, teen pop
- Languages: Russian; Ukrainian (2 tracks; one is all in ukrainian, second - partly)
- Labels: CD Land, Pony Crayon (only Japan and South Korea)
- Producers: Konstantin Meladze; Dmitry Kostyuk; Arina Abramova

Nu Virgos chronology
Stop! Stop! Stop! (2004)	Brillianty (2005)	L.M.L. (2007)

Singles from Brillianty
- 1. "Prityazhenya bolshe net" Released: January 2004; 2. "Net nichego khuzhe" Released: April 2005; 3. "Brillianty" Released: September 2005

Brillianty (Russian: Бриллианты, Diamonds) is the first compilation album by Nu Virgos.

== Track listing ==
Original 2005 release
No.	Title	Length
1.	"Brillianty" (Бриллианты, lit. Diamonds)	3:25
2.	"Oj, govorila chista voda" (Ой, говорила чиста вода, lit. Ouch, clean water said)	3:54
3.	"Biologiya" (Биология, lit. Biology)	3:44
4.	"Stop! Stop! Stop! (album version)" (Стоп! Стоп! Стоп!, lit. Stop! Stop! Stop!)	3:46
5.	"Popytka No. 5" (Попытка No. 5, lit. Endeavor No. 5)	3:23
6.	"Okean i tri reki (feat. Valeriy Meladze)" (Океан и три реки (совместно с Валерием Меладзе), lit. Ocean & three rivers)	3:37
7.	"Mir, o kotorom ya ne znala do tebya" (Мир, о котором я не знала до тебя, lit. World about which I never thought before you)	3:55
8.	"Prityazhenya bolshe net (feat. Valeriy Meladze)" (Притяженья больше нет (совместно с Валерием Мелазде), lit. No attraction anymore)	4:24
9.	"Good morning, papa!" (Good morning, папа!, lit. Good morning, daddy!)	3:33
10.	"Ubey moyu podrugu" (Убей мою подругу, lit. Kill my girlfriend)	3:44
11.	"Ne ostavlyay menya ljubimiy" (Не оставляй меня любимый, lit. Don't ever leave me love)	3:30
12.	"Ya ne vernus" (Я не вернусь, lit. I won't be back)	3:46
13.	"Bomba" (Бомба, lit. Bomb)	3:26
14.	"Net nichego khuzhe (feat. TNMK)" (Нет ничего хуже (совместно с ТНМК), lit. No anything worst)	3:40

== Release history ==
Country	Release date
Russia	December 12, 2005
Ukraine	December 12, 2005
