= Love in the Big City 2 =

2010 film by Marius Vaisbergas

- Directed by: Maryus Vaysberg
- Written by: Maryus Vaysberg
- Produced by: Sergei Livnev; Lev Nikolau
- Starring: Aleksey Chadov; Volodymyr Zelenskyy; Ville Haapasalo; Vera Brezhneva
- Cinematography: Irek Khartovich
- Music by: Vladimir Sayko
- Distributed by: Leopolis
- Release date: February 24, 2010
- Running time: 93 minutes
- Countries: Russia; Ukraine; USA
- Languages: Russian, English
- Budget: $2,500,000 (estimated)
- Box office: $10 208 556 $12,923,001 worldwide

Love in the Big City 2 (Russian: «Любовь в большом городе 2», romanized: Lyubov v bolshom gorode 2) is a 2010 romantic comedy film directed by Maryus Vaysberg. This is the second film in the trilogy about the adventures of three friends in search of true love. This film is a project by Kvartal 95 Studio.

In 2018 the film was banned in Ukraine under the Law of Ukraine "On Cinematography", as it included a blacklisted Russian actor.

== Plot ==
The film begins in Thailand, on the ranch of Igor's father, and continues in Moscow. Igor invites friends to the ranch to introduce Nastya to his father and to have a good time. On the way to the plane the friends get acquainted with a young American family that is going to one of the monasteries to recover from infertility. Igor, Artem and Sauna try to dissuade their girlfriends from visiting the monastery, but without success. An ancient idol is located in the monastery, which according to the legends, grants paternity to anyone who touches it. Despite the monk's warning, the friends still make physical contact with the idol and are now doomed to conceive a child at the first sexual intercourse. Afraid of this, they temporarily decide to refrain from sex, which causes discontent of their sweethearts, who become offended and leave. Igor's situation is aggravated by the fact that his father is an oligarch against his relationship with Nastya and wants to arrange a profitable marriage for him in order to fix his financial affairs, and Nastya learns about this with all the ensuing consequences. The guys decide to spend the rest of their time in leisure, but then they meet their old friend — Saint Valentine, who puts a new spell on them — only one of them will become a father, and the rest will be able to have a child no earlier than in 10 years. The guys realize that they are ready for paternity, and adventures begin.

== Cast ==
- Aleksey Chadov — Artem
- Volodymyr Zelenskyy — Igor
- Ville Haapasalo — Oleg "Sauna"
- Vera Brezhneva — Katya
- Svetlana Khodchenkova — Nastya Korshun
- Anastasia Zadorozhnaya — Alisa Gromova
- Leonid Yarmolnik — father of Igor
- Igor Vernik — director of the dental clinic
- Philipp Kirkorov — Buddhist monk (Saint Valentine)
- Pavel Volya — taxi driver Hamlet
- Anastasia Stotskaya — Vika (cameo appearance)
- Igor Jijikine — Oleg
- Pavel Derevyanko — guard of the sports building
- Mikhail Yefremov — coach
- Ravshana Kurkova — Elena
- Evelina Bledans — Irina Sergeevna
- Aleksandr Loye — assistant duty officer for internal affairs
- Olga Zinkovskaya — client of Nastia
- Spartak Sumchenko — Oleg's classmate
- Sergei Druzyak — Patient of Anastasia Igorevny
- Yevhen Koshovyi — guest worker

== Production ==
The film was produced as the second part of the trilogy in Bangkok, Thailand.
