= Svetlana Loboda discography =

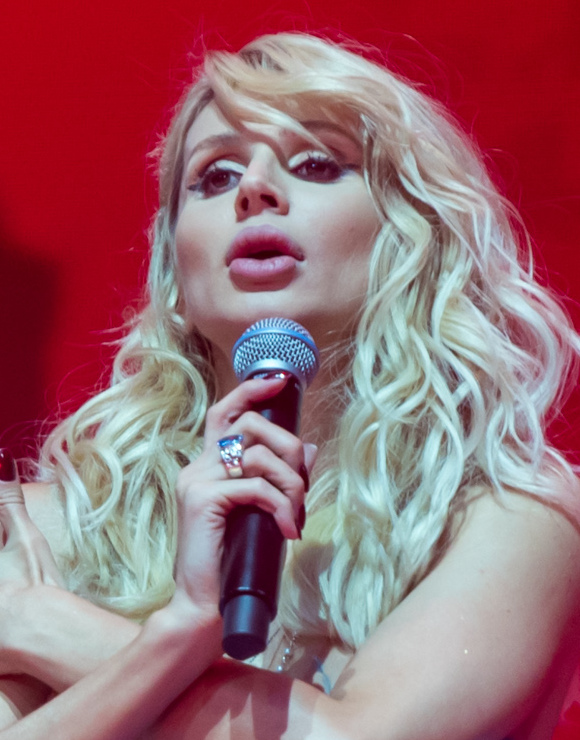
- Loboda at Big Love Show 2018 in Saint Petersburg
- Studio albums: 4
- EPs: 1
- Live albums: 1
- Compilation albums: 3
- Singles: 61
- Remix albums: 3

Ukrainian singer Svetlana Loboda (LOBODA) has released four studio albums, one extended play (EP), three compilation albums, one live album, three remix albums and sixty-one singles.

== Albums ==
=== Studio albums ===
Title	Album details	Certifications
Ty ne zabudesh	Released: 25 September 2005; Label: Universal Music, Moon Records; Formats: CD, cassette	
Ne ma4o	Released: 15 April 2008; Label: Moon Records; Formats: CD	
H2LO	Released: 24 March 2017; Label: Sony Music Entertainment; Formats: Digital download	RUS: 3× Platinum
Made in U	Released: 24 March 2023; Formats: Digital download	

=== Live albums ===
Title	Album details
Superstar Show Live	Released: 17 October 2020; Label: Sony Music Entertainment; Formats: Digital download

=== Remix albums ===
Title	Album details
Chyorny angel	Released: 19 May 2006; Label: Moon Records; Formats: CD
Postoy, mushchina!	Released: 18 November 2006; Label: Moon Records; Formats: CD
Made in U (Mixes)	Released: 22 September 2023; Formats: Digital download

=== Compilation albums ===
Title	Album details
Anti-Crisis Girl	Released: 17 May 2009; Label: S&A music group, Moon Records; Formats: CD
Novoye i luchsheye	Released: 2010; Label: Moon Records; Formats: CD
Pesni vysshey proby	Released: 2010; Label: Moon Records; Formats: CD

=== EPs ===
Title	Album details	Certifications
Sold Out	Released: 14 December 2019; Label: Sony Music Entertainment; Formats: Digital download	RUS: 3× Platinum
MEGAMIX (XXLo World Tour)	Released: 10 January 2025; Label: none; Formats: Digital download	
18	Released: 27 June 2025; Label: none; Formats: Digital download	

== Singles ==
Year	Title	Peak chart positions								Certifications	Album
Year	Title	UKR	CIS	EST	KAZ	LAT	LIT	MDA	RUS	Certifications	Album
2004	"Chyorno-belya zima"	—	54	—	—	—	—	—	79		Ty ne zabudesh
2005	"Tam, pod oblakami"	45	86	—	—	—	—	—	—		Ty ne zabudesh
2005	"Ya zabudu tebya"	—	—	—	—	—	—	—	—		Ty ne zabudesh
2006	"Chyorny angel"	40	—	—	—	—	—	—	—		Ty ne zabudesh
2006	"Postoy, mushchina!"	32	106	—	—	—	—	—	—		Non-album single
2006	"Schactye"	52	—	—	—	—	—	—	—		Ne ma4o
2007	"Mishka, gadkiy malchishka!"	—	—	—	—	—	—	—	—		Ne ma4o
2008	"Ne macho"	20	101	—	—	—	—	—	—		Ne ma4o
2008	"Za chto"	22	116	—	—	—	—	—	—		Ne ma4o
2008	"By Your Side" (with Dj Lutique)	—	—	—	—	—	—	—	—		Non-album single
2009	"Be My Valentine! (Anti-Crisis Girl)"	7	114	—	—	—	—	—	—		Anti-Crisis Girl
2009	"Paren, ty niCHyo"	34	128	—	—	—	—	—	—		Anti-Crisis Girl
2010	"Zhit legko"	—	—	—	—	—	—	—	—		Non-album singles
2010	"Serdtse byotsya" (with Max Barskih)	8	114	—	—	—	—	—	—		Non-album singles
2010	"Revolutsiya"	2	35	—	—	—	—	—	51		Non-album singles
2011	"Spasibo"	10	128	—	—	—	—	—	—		Non-album singles
2011	"Na svete"	1	65	—	—	—	—	—	—		Non-album singles
2012	"Oblaka"	1	55	—	—	—	—	—	—		Non-album singles
2012	"What about U"	—	—	—	—	—	—	—	—		Non-album singles
2012	"40 gradusov"	1	28	—	—	—	—	—	96		Non-album singles
2013	"Pod lyod"	1	64	—	—	—	—	—	—		Non-album singles
2013	"Kohana"	—	—	—	—	—	—	—	—		Non-album singles
2013	"Gorod pod zapretom"	2	38	—	—	—	—	—	—		Non-album singles
2014	"Smotrish v nebo" (with Emin Agalarov)	2	47	—	—	—	—	—	75		Nachistotu
2014	"Ne nuzhna"	3	148	—	—	—	—	—	—		Non-album singles
2015	"Pora domoy"	1	15	—	—	—	—	—	42		Non-album singles
2015	"Oblish"	—	181	—	—	—	—	—	—		Non-album singles
2016	"K chyortu lyubov"	1	3	—	—	—	—	—	9		H2LO
2016	"Tvoi glaza"	1	1	—	116	—	—	96	3	RUS: Platinum	H2LO
2017	"Tekila-lyubov"	—	155	—	—	—	—	—	—		H2LO
2017	"Sluchaynaya"	13	6	—	—	—	—	—	15		H2LO
2018	"Paren"	17	4	—	—	—	—	—	10		Non-album singles
2018	"Leti"	—	40	—	—	—	—	—	37		Non-album singles
2018	"SuperStar"	26	6	—	—	—	—	121	7		Non-album singles
2018	"Instadrama"	14	10	—	—	—	—	—	9		Non-album singles
2019	"Posledny geroy"	—	—	—	—	—	—	—	—		Non-album singles
2019	"Pulya-dura"	7	5	—	—	—	—	—	8		Non-album singles
2019	"V zone riska"	87	39	—	—	—	—	—	40		Sold Out
2019	"Mira malo"	18	21	—	—	—	—	—	22		Non-album single
2019	"Novy Rim"	32	69	—	—	—	—	—	63		Sold Out
2020	"Moy"	33	26	—	88	—	—	—	25		Non-album singles
2020	"Boom Boom" (with Pharaoh)	43	—	—	—	—	—	—	—	RUS: Platinum	Non-album singles
2020	"Moloko"	38	36	—	—	—	—	—	26	RUS: Platinum	Non-album singles
2021	"Rodnoy"	17	12	—	—	—	—	55	10		Non-album singles
2021	"Allo"	20	21	—	—	—	—	—	16		Non-album singles
2021	"Indie Rock (Vogue)"	—	—	—	—	—	—	—	—		Non-album singles
2021	"Malysh"	—	—	—	—	—	—	—	—		13 druzey Bilana
2021	"Americano"	32	79	—	—	—	—	—	71		Non-album singles
2021	"ZanesLo"	17	38	—	—	—	—	—	35		Non-album singles
2021	"Vsyo proydyot"	—	—	—	—	—	—	—	—		Non-album singles
2022	"Molytva"	—	—	—	—	—	—	—	—		Non-album singles
2022	"Dva neznaiomtsi"	—	—	—	—	—	—	—	—		Made in U
2022	"Goroda"	—	—	—	—	—	—	—	—		Made in U
2023	"Po-Ukrainski"	—	—	—	—	—	—	—	—		Made in U
2023	"Spogady"	—	—	—	—	—	—	—	—		Non-album singles
2023	"Kyiv-Titstsa"	—	—	—	—	—	—	—	—		Non-album singles
2023	"Metelitsa"	—	—	46	—	—	—	—	—		Non-album singles
2024	"Mentor"	—	—	—	—	—	—	—	—		Non-album singles
2024	"Imya"	—	—	48	—	2	—	—	—		Non-album singles
2024	"Molodaya"	—	—	—	—	28	—	—	—		Non-album singles
2024	"Lyubov do kontsa sveta"	—	—	—	—	24	31	—	—		Non-album singles
2025	"Instynkt"	—	—	—	—	—	—	—	—		Non-album singles
2025	"Ne meshay"	—	—	—	—	19	19	58	—		Non-album singles
2025	"One Night"	—	—	—	—	—	—	—	—		Non-album singles
2026	"Malyshka na million"	—	—	—	—	51	—	—	—		Non-album singles
2026	"Vzroslye devochki ne plachut"	—	—	—	—	7	—	77	—		Non-album singles
2026	"Sen meni küt" (with Kairat Nurtas)	—	—	—	3	—	—	—	—		Non-album singles
2026	"O ney"	—	—	—	—	9	—	—	—		Non-album singles
"—" denotes items which were not released in that country or failed to chart.

== See also ==
- Svetlana Loboda videography
