= Svetlana Loboda videography =

The Videography of Ukrainian singer Svetlana Loboda includes 47 music videos, four mood videos & two lyric videos.

== Music videos ==
=== Videoclips ===
Year	Title	Director	Ref.
2004	«Чёрно-белая зима»	Alan Badoev	
2005	«Я забуду тебя»	Alan Badoev	
2005	«Ты не забудешь»	Alan Badoev	
2006	«Чёрный ангел»	Aleksandr & Igor Stekolenko	
2006	«Постой, муЩина!»	Badoev	
2007	«Мишка, гадкий мальчишка»	Badoev	
2007	«Счастье»	Mikhail Segal	
2008	«Не ма4о»	Badoev	
2008	«За что»	Badoev	
2008	«By Your Side» (with DJ Lutique)	Badoev	
2009	«Be My Valentine (Anti-Crisis Girl)» / «Парень, ты ниЧё»	Badoev	
2010	«Жить легко»	Badoev	
2010	«Сердце бьётся» (with Max Barskih)	Badoev	
2010	«Революция»	Badoev	
2011	«Спасибо»	Evgeniy Timokhin	
2011	«На свете»	Badoev	
2012	«Облака» / «Женщина-преступница»	Vladimir Shklyarevskiy	
2012	«What About U»	Svetlana Loboda (herself)	
2012	«40 градусов»	Vladimir Shklyarevskiy	
2013	«Под лёд»	Vladimir Shklyarevskiy	
2013	«Под лёд (Remake)»	Kadim Tarasov	
2013	«Кохана»	Natella Krapivina	
2013	«Город под запретом» (Concert version)	Loboda	
2014	«Город под запретом»	Duet Drelles	
2014	«Смотришь в небо» (with Emin)	Krapivina	
2015	«Не нужна»	Krapivina	
2015	«Пора домой»	Krapivina	
2015	«Облиш»	Krapivina	
2016	«К чёрту любовь»	Krapivina	
2016	«Твои глаза»	Krapivina	
2017	«Случайная»	Krapivina	
2018	«Парень»	Krapivina	
2018	«Лети»	Krapivina	
2018	«Superstar»	Krapivina	
2019	«Instadrama»	Krapivina	
2019	«Пуля-дура»	Krapivina	
2020	«Новый Рим»	Badoev	
2020	«Мой»	Phil Lee	
2020	«Boom Boom» (with Pharaoh)	Roma Kim, Misha Semichev	
2020	«Boom Boom» (ЖАРА Music Awards 2020) (with Pharaoh)	Konstantin Gordienko	
2020	«Moloko»	Badoev	
2021	«Родной»	Anna Melikian	
2021	«Indie Rock (Vogue)»	Indi Hait	
2021	«Americano»	Indi Hait	
2022	«Молитва»	Indi Hait	
2022	«Города»	Loboda	
2023	«По-украïнськи»	Gordienko	

=== Mood videos ===
Year	Title	Director
2019	«Мира мало»	Alan Badoev
2019	«Новый Рим»	Alan Badoev
2021	«Allo»	Alan Badoev
2021	«ЗанесLo»	
2022	«Два незнайомці»	

=== Lyric videos ===
Year	Title	Director
2019	«В зоне риска»	
2019	«Мира мало»	

== With others ==
Year	Title	Director
2004	«Биология» (with «ВИА Гры»)	Семён Горов
