= Maruv discography =

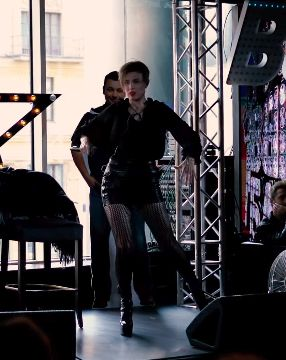
- Maruv performing at the Moscow Ruki Vverkh! Bar in 2019
- Studio albums: 2
- EPs: 4
- Singles: 48

The discography of Ukrainian singer Maruv (who also releases material under as Shlakoblochina and Sharlotta Ututu) includes two studio albums, four extended plays and forty-eight singles.

Before starting her solo career, Maruv participated in the band the Pringlez, but left it in 2018. The singer released her first solo EP Stories on 5 May 2017 on SoundCloud, two singles were released from it: "Sontse" and "Let Me Love You". In December of the same year, the singer released the single "Drunk Groove" with Boosin. The song got into heavy rotation in the CIS countries, in April it took first place in Russia, and in July — in Ukraine, the song also rose to the top ten in the charts of Bulgaria and Poland, in the latter it received two platinum certifications. The next single was the song "Focus on Me", which was also popular on the radio and took first place in the charts of Russia and Ukraine. On 28 September 2018, the singer's full-length debut studio album Black Water was released; the record became triple platinum in Russia.

On 13 February 2019, Maruv released the single "Siren Song", with which she was supposed to represent Ukraine at the Eurovision Song Contest. In the second week of rotation, the song rose to second place in the radio chart of Ukraine, in Russia the song also took second place, but in the general chart of the CIS the song became number one. On 17 May the singer released a collaboration with French DJ Mosimann — the song "Mon Amour". In August, Maruv presented her first single in Russian, "Mezhdu nami". On 8 November 2019, the singer released the single "To Be Mine", which became the first chapter of her new project. Every following week, she released a new song, and on 29 November a new EP called Hellcat Story became available.

On 6 March 2020, the singer, as her alter ego Shlakoblochina, released a new single "Novaya sila kiski" featuring Fearmuch. On 10 April the EP Fatality was released. On 5 June the singer released the single "I Want You" again as Maruv, which was able to get to the third place of the Russian radio chart. On 12 November the singer presented a cover version of the song "Yest tolko mig", which became the soundtrack to the TV series Dyatlov Pass, and a day later released the single "Maria".

In 2021, the singer returned to her alter ego Shlakoblochina and released the single "VIP" on 29 January. On 5 November the second studio album No Name was released on the Sony Music label.

== Albums ==
=== Studio albums ===
Title	Album details	Certifications
Black Water	Released: 28 September 2018; Label: Warner Music Russia; Formats: Digital download	NFPF: 3× Platinum
No Name	Released: 5 November 2021; Label: Sony Music Russia; Formats: Digital download	

== EPs ==
Title	Album details
Stories	Released: 5 may 2017; Label: UMIG Music; Formats: Digital download
Hellcat Story	Released: 29 November 2019; Label: Warner Music Russia; Formats: Digital download
Fatality (as Shlakoblochina)	Released: 10 April 2020; Label: Warner Music Russia; Formats: Digital download
Love Songs (as Sharlotta Ututu)	Released: 27 October 2023; Formats: Digital download

== Singles ==
List of singles as lead artist, with selected chart positions and certifications, showing year released and album name
Title	Year	Peak chart positions								Certifications	Album
Title	Year	UKR	BUL	CIS	KAZ	LIT	MDA	POL	RUS	Certifications	Album
"Sontse"	2017	—	—	—	—	—	—	—	—		Stories
"Let Me Love You"	2017	—	—	—	—	—	—	—	—		Stories
"Spyny"	2017	—	—	—	—	—	—	—	—		Non-album single
"Drunk Groove" (with Boosin)	2017	1	8	1	—	—	62	8	1	ZPAV: 2× Platinum	Black Water
"Focus on Me"	2018	1	—	2	—	—	—	—	1		Black Water
"Black Water"	2018	—	—	109	—	—	—	—	104		Black Water
"For You" (with Faruk Sabanci)	2018	36	—	44	—	—	—	—	43		Non-album singles
"Siren Song"	2019	2	—	1	—	70	—	—	2	NFPF: 3× Platinum	Non-album singles
"Mon Amour" (with Mosimann)	2019	72	—	61	—	—	—	—	56		Non-album singles
"Black Water" (Hip Hop Version) (with Betty FO SHO)	2019	—	—	—	—	—	—	—	—		Non-album singles
"Mezhdu nami"	2019	—	—	—	—	—	—	—	—		Non-album singles
"To Be Mine"	2019	—	—	—	—	—	—	—	—		Hellcat Story
"Don't Stop"	2019	—	—	—	—	—	—	—	—		Hellcat Story
"Don't U Waste My Time"	2019	—	—	—	—	—	—	—	—		Hellcat Story
"If You Want Her"	2019	—	—	—	—	—	—	—	—		Hellcat Story
"Novaya sila kiski" (as Shlakoblochina featuring Fearmuch)	2020	—	—	—	—	—	—	—	—		Fatality
"Samoletnaya" (as Shlakoblochina)	2020	—	—	—	—	—	—	—	—		Fatality
"I Want You"	2020	—	—	4	—	—	—	—	2		Non-album singles
"Sad Song"	2020	—	—	9	—	—	—	—	6		Non-album singles
"More"	2020	—	—	—	—	—	—	—	—		Non-album singles
"Yest tolko mig" (with Danya Milokhin)	2020	—	—	—	—	—	—	—	—		Non-album singles
"Maria"	2020	—	—	—	—	—	—	—	—		Non-album singles
"VIP" (as Shlakoblochina)	2021	—	—	—	—	—	—	—	—		Non-album singles
"Crush"	2021	—	—	—	—	—	—	—	—		Non-album singles
"Call 911" (with Sickotoy)	2021	—	—	91	—	—	—	—	67		Non-album singles
"Komilfo" (with Filipp Kirkorov)	2021	—	—	—	—	—	—	—	—		Non-album singles
"Candy Shop"	2021	—	—	—	—	—	—	—	169		Non-album singles
"No More" (with Filipp Kirkorov)	2021	—	—	—	—	—	—	—	—		Non-album singles
"Rich Bitch"	2021	—	—	—	—	—	—	—	—		No Name
"Bullet" (with The Hatters)	2021	—	—	—	—	—	—	—	—		No Name
"Ne zabudu"	2021	—	—	—	—	—	—	—	—		No Name
"Shpok Shpok" (as Shlakoblochina)	2021	—	—	—	—	—	—	—	—		Non-album singles
"Yolochka" (as Shlakoblochina with Boosin)	2021	—	—	—	—	—	—	—	—		Non-album singles
"Proshchay"	2021	—	—	54	137	—	34	—	44		Non-album singles
"Killing Me Softly" (as Sharlotta Ututu)	2023	—	—	—	—	—	—	—	—		Love Songs
"Solo un beso"	2023	—	—	—	—	—	—	—	—		Non-album singles
"Big Mama Boss" (as Shlakoblochina)	2023	—	—	—	—	—	—	—	—		Non-album singles
"On Fleek Baby" (as Shlakoblochina)	2024	—	—	—	—	—	—	—	—		Non-album singles
"Corazón"	2024	—	—	—	—	—	—	—	—		Non-album singles
"Every Time I Put Myself To Sleep" (as Sharlotta Ututu)	2024	—	—	—	—	—	—	—	—		Non-album singles
"Hit Me"	2024	—	—	—	—	—	—	—	—		Non-album singles
"No Longer Beloved"	2024	—	—	—	—	—	—	—	—		Non-album singles
"Carlos es bombero"	2024	—	—	—	—	—	—	—	—		Non-album singles
"Yes"	2024	—	—	—	—	—	—	—	—		Non-album singles
"Need to Party"	2024	—	—	—	—	—	—	—	—		Non-album singles
"Ya sleza"	2024	—	—	—	—	—	—	—	—		Non-album singles
"Cash"	2024	—	—	—	—	—	—	—	—		Non-album singles
"Sweet Chiquita"	2024	—	—	—	—	—	—	—	—		Non-album singles
"—" denotes a single that did not chart or was not released.

== Guest appearances ==
Title	Year	Artist	Album
"Po ldu"	2019	Jah Khalib	Vykhod v svet

=== Remixes ===
Title	Year	Artist	Album
"Hide Away" (Maruv & Boosin Remix)	2018	Synapson, Holly	Hide Away Remixes EP
"No More" (Maruv & Boosin Remix)	2018	Pola Rise	Non-album remixes
"I Used to Cry" (Maruv & Boosin Remix)	2018	Imany	Non-album remixes
"Insta" (remix by Maruv)	2019	Loboda	Sold Out
