= Krapivin =

Krapivin (Russian: Крапивин) is a Russian masculine surname originating from the word krapiva (nettle); its feminine counterpart is Krapivina. It may refer to

- Natella Krapivina (born 1982), Ukrainian film producer
- Vladislav Krapivin (1938–2020), Russian children's books writer
