= Moloko (disambiguation) =

Moloko were an electronic/pop duo from Sheffield, England.

Moloko may also refer to:

- The Moloko language
- Moloko Plus, a fictional drink in the book A Clockwork Orange
- Moloko Temo, an African woman, a longevity claimant
- "Moloko" (song), a song by Ukrainian singer Loboda
