= 40 gradusov =

2012 single by Loboda

Single by Loboda
- Released: 15 November 2012
- Genre: Pop music
- Length: 4:25
- Label: Zion Music
- Songwriters: Dmitry Monatik; Svetlana Loboda
- Producer: Natella Krapivina

Loboda singles chronology
"Oblaka" (2012)	"40 gradusov" (2012)	"Pod lyod" (2013)

Music video
- "40 gradusov" on YouTube

"40 gradusov" (Russian: 40 градусов; transl. 40 degrees) is a song recorded by Ukrainian singer Loboda, released as a standalone single on 15 November 2012 by Zion Music. The song was written by Monatik and Loboda, and produced by Natella Krapivina.

== Music video ==
A music video was shot for the song in Iceland. According to Loboda, the Nordic landscape was not chosen by chance, every time she listened to the song, she thought about the cold, loneliness and unhappy love. The main role was played by the Danish actor Rudi Køhnke. Especially for the filming, the singer took ballet lessons, and also learned to play the cello.

== Commercial performance ==
In the ninth week of its stay in the Ukrainian chart Tophit the song topped the chart, and remained at the top spot for twelve weeks. At the end of 2013, it became the third most popular song on Ukrainian radio according to Tophit. In Russia, the song took the 96th place in TopHit chart, at that time it was the best result for the singer in the chart.

== Awards and nominations ==
The song became the winner of many music awards, it won in all the declared categories. In 2020 the song was included in the list "20 iconic songs for 20 years" of the Ukrainian music award YUNA.

Year	Award	Category	Result	Ref.
2013	Krasnaya zvezda	Best song	Won	
2013	Ukrainskaya pesnya goda	Best song	Won	
2013	Fashion People Awards	Fashion music video	Won	
2014	YUNA	Best song	Won	
2014	YUNA	Best music video	Won	
2020	YUNA	20 iconic songs for 20 years	Won	

== Track listing ==
Digital download and streaming
No.	Title	Length
1.	"40 градусов"	4:25
2.	"40 градусов" (Alex Ortega & Ivan Demsoff Remix)	3:45

== Charts ==
=== Weekly charts ===
Chart (2012–13)	Peak position
CIS Airplay (TopHit)	28
Russia Airplay (TopHit) Alex Ortega & Ivan Demsoff Remix	96
Ukraine Airplay (TopHit)	1

=== Year-end charts ===
Chart (2012)	Position
Ukraine Airplay (Tophit)	182
Chart (2013)	Position
CIS (Tophit)	108
Ukraine Airplay (Tophit)	3
