= Anti-Crisis Girl =

Compilation album by Svetlana Loboda
- Released: 17 May 2009
- Recorded: 2006–2009
- Genre: Pop; rock; R&B
- Language: English; Russian
- Label: S&A; Moon

Svetlana Loboda chronology
Ne ma4o (2008)	Anti-Crisis Girl (2009)	H2LO (2017)

Singles from Anti-Crisis Girl
- 1. "By Your Side" Released: December 2008; 2. "Be My Valentine! (Anti-Crisis Girl)" Released: 6 April 2009; 3. "Paren, ty nichyo" Released: 11 May 2009

Professional ratings
Review scores
Source	Rating
Nikolay Fandeyev	2/5 stars

Anti-Crisis Girl is a compilation album by Ukrainian artist Svetlana Loboda. The album was released to promote her appearance at the Eurovision Song Contest 2009. Loboda participated on behalf of Ukraine with the song "Be My Valentine! (Anti-Crisis Girl)" which features on the album in both English and Russian (Парень, Ты НиЧё! Paren, Ti NiCHo)

== Track listing ==
Audio:
No.	Title	Writer(s)	Length
1.	"Be My Valentine (Anti-Crisis Girl)"	Svetlana Loboda; Yevgeny Matyushenko	3:00
2.	"By Your Side" (feat. DJ Lutique)	DJ Lutique	3:28
3.	"Не мачо / Not A Macho"	Loboda	2:55
4.	"Мишка, гадкий мальчишка! / Michael, Bad boy"	Loboda; Mikhail Yasinsky	3:38
5.	"Постой, мущина / Stay, Man!"	Loboda	3:48
6.	"Чёрно-белая зима / Black And White Winter"	Taras Demchuk	3:45
7.	"Я тебя не помню / I Don't Remember You"	Loboda	4:04
8.	"За что? / What For?"	Loboda	3:45
9.	"Чёрный ангел / Black Angel"	Loboda; Grigory Denisenko	3:51
10.	"Парень, ты ниЧё! / You're Something!"	Loboda	3:00
11.	"За что? / What For?" (Rock Version)	Loboda	3:45
12.	"Be My Valentine (Anti-Crisis Girl)" (Remix by the Maneken, 2009)	Loboda; Matyushenko	4:25
13.	"Outro"	T. Reshetko	3:16

Video
No.	Title	Director	Length
1.	"Be My Valentine (Anti-Crisis Girl)"	Alan Badoev
2.	"What for? / За что?"	Svetlana Loboda
3.	"Парень, ты ниЧё! / You're Something!"	Alan Badoev

== Release history ==
Region	Date	Format(s)	Label
Ukraine	17 May 2009	CD (Digipack)	S&A Music Group; Moon Records
Russia	17 May 2009	CD (Digipack)	Soyuz Music; Moon Records
