= Allo (song) =

Single by Loboda
- Language: Russian
- Released: 16 July 2021
- Genre: Dance-pop
- Length: 3:48
- Label: Sony Music
- Composers: Vyacheslav Parshin; Fyodor Marfelev
- Lyricists: Alina Markina; Serafima Krestinskaya; Ulyana Cheshenkova

Loboda singles chronology
"Rodnoy" (2021)	"Allo" (2021)	"Indie Rock (Vogue)" (2021)

Music video
- "Allo" on YouTube

"Allo" is a song recorded by Ukrainian singer Loboda, released as a standalone single on 16 July 2021 by Sony Music.

== Background and release ==
On June 30, Loboda announced a new single on her Instagram, presenting a few lines, and also announced a contest for subscribers: whoever names the release date of the new song will receive an autographed acoustic guitar from her. On July 12, the singer presented an excerpt of the video and announced the name of the song.

The song was written by young Russian authors: the music was written by Vyacheslav Parshin and Fyodor Marfelev, and the lyrics were written by Alina Markina, Ulyana Cheshenkova and Serafima Krestinskaya.

This is the first song of the singer, released after she finished working with producer Natella Krapivina.

== Music video ==
The music video for the song was released on the same day. It was directed by Alan Badoev, with whom Loboda had previously collaborated several times. According to the performer, the development of the project took place in a short time: just a couple of days after Loboda Badoev's call, the latter presented the concept and assembled a team. The video was shot in Kyiv, at night, a few hours before dawn.

In the video, Loboda appears on a podium illuminated by lamps. Gradually, the illumination and the singer's surroundings change, morning replaces night, and the singer continues to dance. In the finale, a couple of motorcyclists are circling around Loboda, and she herself is swinging on a giant cube.

== Critical reception ==
In their review for Moskovskij Komsomolets, Ilya Legostaev and Artur Gasparyan noted that this is "an impeccably tailored and perfectly sewn track according to all the already known patterns of Loboda herself, generously sprinkled with characteristic hooks, loops and samples," which, however, "did not become the very revolution that the artist arranged at one time in the local show biz." The authors concluded that "her pop music express is still famously racing along the main road, but increasingly its stops, turns and maneuvers are becoming more predictable."

== Charts ==
=== Weekly charts ===
Chart (2021)	Peak position
CIS Airplay (TopHit)	12
Russia Airplay (TopHit)	16
Ukraine Airplay (TopHit)	20

=== Monthly charts ===
Chart (2021)	Peak position
CIS (TopHit)	26
Russia Airplay (TopHit)	27
Ukraine Airplay (TopHit)	33

=== Year-end charts ===
Chart (2021)	Position
CIS (TopHit)	129
Russia Airplay (TopHit)	113
