= Tvoi glaza =

2016 single by Loboda

Single by Loboda

from the album H2LO
- Language: Russian
- English title: "Your Eyes"
- Released: 6 September 2016
- Genre: Pop music
- Length: 3:53
- Label: Sony Music
- Songwriters: Igor Mayskiy; Svetlana Loboda; Rita Dakota
- Producer: Natella Krapivina

Loboda singles chronology
"K chyortu lyubov" (2016)	"Tvoi glaza" (2016)	"Tekila-lyubov" (2017)

Music video
- "Tvoi glaza" on YouTube

"Tvoi glaza" (Russian: Твои глаза, lit. 'Your Eyes') is a song recorded by Ukrainian singer Loboda, released as a standalone single on 6 September 2016 by Sony Music. It was later included on Loboda's third studio album H2LO (2017). The song was written by Igor Maysky, Loboda, Rita Dakota, and produced by Natella Krapivina.

== Music video ==
The music video for the song was shot in Andalusia. According to the producer of the artist and director of the video Natella Krapivina, they initially wanted to shoot in Portugal, but when they found out that the music video maker Alan Badoev was flying there to shoot a video for Max Barskih, they stopped on Andalusia.

The main idea of the video is that a man and a woman often find themselves in situations where they think that they are from different planets. The video is dedicated to people who met, fell in love, but could not understand each other.

This is the most viewed video clip of the singer with more than 189 million views on YouTube in 2024.

== Commercial performance ==
The song was a commercial success. For 5 weeks "Tvoi glaza" held the lead in the iTunes chart of the CIS countries. According to InterMedia, the song became the sixth best-selling in the Russian iTunes for 2017. The song also became the most listened to on Yandex.Music service in 2017.

The song reached 2nd place in the CIS and 3rd place in Russian airplay charts. The single was certified platinum in Russia with total sales of over 200,000 copies.

== Awards and nominations ==
The song was nominated for several awards as Song of the year, including the Muz-TV Music Awards, RU.TV Music Awards and Realnaya premiya MusicBox. It received a Golden Gramophone Award and was recognized as the most rotated song in Russia at the awards TopHit Music Awards 2018.

Year	Award	Category	Result	Ref.
2017	Golden Gramophone Award		Won	
2017	Muz-TV Music Awards	Best song	Nominated	
2017	RU.TV Music Awards	Best song	Nominated	
2017	RU.TV Music Awards	Best creative	Won	
2017	Realnaya premiya MusicBox	Song of the year	Nominated	
2018	TopHit Music Awards	Most rotated song	Won	

== Track listing ==
"Tvoi glaza" - Digital download and streaming
No.	Title	Length
1.	"Tvoi glaza"	3:53

== Charts ==
=== Weekly charts ===
Chart (2016–17)	Peak position
CIS Airplay (TopHit)	2
Russia Airplay (TopHit)	3
Ukraine Airplay (TopHit)	1

=== Monthly charts ===
Chart (2016)	Peak position
CIS (TopHit)	1
Russia Airplay (TopHit)	2
Ukraine Airplay (TopHit)	1

=== Year-end charts ===
Chart (2016)	Position
CIS (TopHit)	60
Russia Airplay (TopHit)	66
Ukraine Airplay (TopHit)	44
Chart (2017)	Position
CIS (TopHit)	17
Latvia Airplay (LaIPA)	84
Russia Airplay (TopHit)	20
Ukraine Airplay (TopHit)	39
Chart (2018)	Position
CIS (TopHit)	101
Russia Airplay (TopHit)	116
Ukraine Airplay (TopHit)	39
Chart (2019)	Position
CIS (TopHit)	147
Russia Airplay (TopHit)	179
Ukraine Airplay (TopHit)	163
Chart (2020)	Position
CIS (TopHit)	141
Russia Airplay (TopHit)	144
Ukraine Airplay (TopHit)	196
Chart (2021)	Position
CIS (TopHit)	146
Russia Airplay (TopHit)	128

== Certifications ==
Region	Certification	Certified units/sales
Russia (NFPF)	Platinum	200,000

== Version with Max Barskih ==
"TvoiGlazaTumany"

Promotional single by Loboda featuring Max Barskih
- Released: 23 June 2017
- Genre: Pop music
- Length: 4:52
- Label: Sony Music; Media Land; SK Prodaction
- Songwriters: Igor Mayskiy; Svetlana Loboda; Rita Dakota; Max Barskih
- Producer: Natella Krapivina

Live performance
- "TvoiGlazaTumany" on YouTube

In 2017 at the Muz-TV Music Awards, Svetlana Loboda and Max Barskih performed together a mashup of their hits "Tvoi glaza" and "Tumany". At the request of fans, a studio version of the song was released on 23 June 2017. It reached the first place in iTunes charts of Russia and Ukraine.

=== Track listing ===
"TvoiGlazaTumany" - Digital download and streaming
No.	Title	Length
1.	"TvoiGlazaTumany" (feat. Max Barskih)	4:52

=== Charts ===
Chart (2017)	Peak position
ERROR in "CIS": Invalid position: 226. Expected number 1–200 or dash (–).
