= Loboda =

Loboda (Ukrainian: Лобода, Russian: Лобода, Polish: Łoboda, Romanian: Loboda) is a surname derived from the Slavic word for plants of the genus Atriplex. It may refer to:

- Alla Loboda (born 1998), Russian ice dancer
- Dorota Łoboda (born 1975), Polish activist
- Hryhory Loboda (died 1596), Ukrainian Cossack hetman
- Kinga Łoboda (born 1996), Polish sailor
- Peter G. Loboda, Ukrainian numismatist
- Svitlana Loboda, Ukrainian singer and composer
- Zygmunt Łoboda (1895–1945), Polish architect
