= H2LO =

Studio album by Loboda
- Released: 24 March 2017
- Genre: Pop music
- Length: 58:57
- Language: Russian
- Label: Sony Music Entertainment
- Producer: Natella Krapivina

Loboda chronology
Anti-Crisis Girl (2009)	H2LO (2017)	Sold Out (2019)

Singles from H2LO
- 1. "Sluchaynaya" Released: 10 March 2017

Album trailer
- H2LO on YouTube

H2LO is the third studio album by Ukrainian singer Loboda, released on 24 March 2017 by Sony Music.

== Critical reception ==
Professional ratings
Review scores
Source	Rating
InterMedia	4/5 stars

InterMedia reviewer Alexey Mazhaeyv noted that "almost every song on H2LO could become a hit single."

== Awards ==
Songs from the album were popular on radio stations in Russia, Ukraine and in the CIS countries, and also received various awards. The album itself was recognized as Album of the Year at the Realnaya Premiya Music Box Awards, BraVo Awards and YUNA Awards. The album received its first Platinum certification in Russia after only a week after release. In November H2LO received the third Platinum certification.

== Track listing ==
H2LO
No.	Title	Writer(s)	Length
1.	"Intro"	Svetlana Loboda	1:08
2.	"Tvoi glaza"	Igor Mayskiy; Loboda; Rita Dakota	3:50
3.	"Sluchaynaya"	Kirill Pavlov	3:53
4.	"Sterva"	Mayskiy	3:39
5.	"K chyortu lyubov"	Oleg Vladi	3:31
6.	"Zharko" (feat. Monatik)	Dmitriy Monatik	3:52
7.	"Ubey menya"	Dakota; Ruslan Kvinta	3:25
8.	"Ne nuzhna"	Loboda; Dakota	3:29
9.	"Nevesta"	Dakota	3:09
10.	"Chut-chut"	Islam Rakhimzhanov; Vladimir Kurto	3:37
11.	"Tntsuyu volosami"	Nikita Kiselev	3:33
12.	"Odnoy masti"	Toskana	3:24
13.	"Parizh"	Kiselev	4:02
14.	"Tekila-lyubov"	Konstantin Meladze	4:14
15.	"K chyortu lyubov" (Kiriyakidi Remix)	Vladi	3:28
16.	"K chyortu lyubov" (Hardy Boy Remix)	Vladi	3:05
17.	"Pora domoy" (Dj Antonio Remix)	Andrey Osadchuk	3:11
Total length:			58:57

== Charts ==
Songs
Title	Year	Peak chart positions		
Title	Year	UKR TopHit	RUS	CIS
"K chyortu lyubov"	2016	1	9	3
"Tvoi glaza"	2016	2	1	1
"Tekila-lyubov"	2017	—	—	155
"Sluchaynaya"	2017	13	15	6
"—" denotes items which were not released in that country or failed to chart.

== Certifications ==
Region	Certification	Certified units/sales
Russia (NFPF)	3× Platinum	60,000
