= Moloko (song) =

Single by Loboda
- Released: 18 December 2020
- Genre: Pop music
- Length: 4:03
- Label: Sony Music
- Songwriter: Yana Dryupina
- Producer: Natella Krapivina

Loboda singles chronology
"Boom Boom" (2020)	"Moloko" (2020)	"Rodnoy" (2021)

Music video
- "Moloko" on YouTube

"Moloko" (stylized as moLOko; transl. Milk) is a song by Ukrainian singer Loboda, released on 18 December 2020 by Sony Music Entertainment. It is known that the song will be included in the Loboda's upcoming album.

In April 2021 the single received Platinum certification in Russia.

== Music video ==
The music video for the song was released the same day. It was directed by Alan Badoev. According to Loboda, the concept of the video took more than four months to develop. The plot of the video shows a family drama that leads a girl to prison. The heroines of the video express their feelings with the help of bright dances. During the first day, the video gained more than one and a half million views.

On the night of 21–22 December, the video was removed from YouTube. Soon the video was restored, and the singer and her producer assured that the perpetrators will be punished.

== Promotion ==
Loboda visited several radio stations and TV channels in Ukraine to promote the single. Including Russkoye Radio (Happy Yolka 2020) and the music TV channel M1 (Ministerstvo Premyer). In Russia the song was performed on 31 December 2020 on Channel One's show Novogodny maskarad.

== Awards and nominations ==
Year	Award	Category	Result	Ref.
2021	Zhara Music Awards	Female music video	Nominated	
2021	Muz-TV Music Awards	Best female music video	Won	
2021	Muzychna platforma	Best song of the year	Won	

== Track listing ==
Digital download and streaming
No.	Title	Length
1.	"moLOko"	4:03

Digital download and streaming
No.	Title	Length
1.	"moLOko" (Remake)	3:40

== Charts ==
=== Weekly charts ===
Chart (2021)	Peak position
CIS Airplay (TopHit)	36
Russia Airplay (TopHit)	26
Ukraine Airplay (TopHit)	38

=== Monthly charts ===
Chart (2021)	Peak position
CIS (TopHit)	38
Russia Airplay (TopHit)	40
Ukraine Airplay (TopHit)	71

=== Year-end charts ===
Chart (2021)	Position
CIS (TopHit)	167
Russia Airplay (TopHit)	170
