= Drunk Groove =

2017 single by Maruv and Boosin

Song by Maruv, Boosin
- Released: December 29, 2017
- Genre: Electronic dance music (EDM)
- Length: 3:46
- Label: Warner Music Russia

"Drunk Groove" (Russian: Пьяный грув) is a song by Ukrainian singer Maruv and Ukrainian producer Mikhail Busina, better known under the pseudonym Boosin. The song was released on 29 December 2017 in which it came from Maruv's debut studio album Black Water through the label Warner Music Russia and immediately gained fame throughout the world.

== History ==
The music video for the song was released on 2 March 2018 on Maruv's official YouTube channel. The director of the video was Serge Vane. In less than a day, the video garnered more than 2.5 million views.

On 8 November 2018, Maruv performed the song on the show "Evening Urgant".

== List of compositions ==
Drunk Groove (Remixes, Pt. 2)
No.	Title	Length
1.	"Drunk Groove" (Johnny Beast Remix)	3:34
2.	"Drunk Groove" (Alex Spite)	4:34
3.	"Drunk Groove" (Rodge Remix)	3:34

== Awards and nominations ==
Award	Year	Category	Result	Ref.
M1 Music Awards	2018	Dance Parade	Won	
Premya Muz-TV	2019	Best foreign language song	Nominated	
Yuna Music Awards	2019	Best video	Nominated	

== Charts ==
2018 weekly chart performance
Chart (2018)	Peak position
Belarus Airplay (Eurofest)	1
Bulgaria Airplay (PROPHON)	8
CIS Airplay (TopHit)	1
Luxembourg Digital Song Sales (Billboard)	3
Poland Airplay (ZPAV)	8
Russia Airplay (TopHit)	1
Ukraine Airplay (TopHit)	1

2023 weekly chart performance
Chart (2023)	Peak position
Moldova Airplay (TopHit)	62

2024 weekly chart performance
Chart (2024)	Peak position
Moldova Airplay (TopHit)	144

2025 weekly chart performance
Chart (2025)	Peak position
Kazakhstan Airplay (TopHit)	190
Moldova Airplay (TopHit)	181

2026 weekly chart performance
Chart (2026)	Peak position
Kazakhstan Airplay (TopHit)	145
Moldova Airplay (TopHit)	194
