= Rodnoy =

Single by Loboda
- Released: 5 March 2021
- Genre: Pop music
- Length: 3:34
- Label: Sony Music
- Songwriter: Dmitry Loren
- Producer: Yekaterina Ryzhaya

Loboda singles chronology
"Moloko" (2020)	"Rodnoy" (2021)	"Allo" (2021)

Music video
- "Rodnoy" on YouTube

"Rodnoy" (Russian: Родной; transl. The closest person) is a song by Ukrainian singer Loboda, released on 5 March 2021 by Sony Music Entertainment.

== Background and release ==
In December 2020, while promoting her previous single "Moloko", the Loboda announced that the next single would premiere on 14 February 2021. However, the song was not released on the scheduled date. On 2 March Loboda shared on her social networks that the new single will be released on 5 March along with a music video. The song was written by Dmitry Loren, who previously wrote the song "Lety" for Loboda.

The song became available on all digital platforms on 5 March 2021.

== Music video ==
The music video for the song was presented on the same day as the song. It was directed by Anna Melikyan, known for such films as "Tenderness", "Fairy", "Three", "Mermaid." The main roles in the video were played by Anna Chipovskaya and Yuri Borisov.

== Critical reception ==
Alexey Mazhaev from InterMedia noted that the high-quality visual range of the music video does not work idle, since the song itself turned out to be a one-hundred-percent hit. He also suggested that in a couple of weeks, the chorus of "Rodnoy" will be sung by a large part of the Russian-speaking population.

== Commercial performance ==
"Rodnoy" was a great success on the radio in the CIS countries. The song entered the top 10 in Russia, Loboda achieved this result for the first time since 2018, when the single "Superstar" was released. In Ukraine, the song reached the 17th place.

According to Apple Music, "Rodnoy" entered the hundred most popular tracks of 2021 in Russia and Ukraine. The video clip for the song became the fourth most viewed music video in 2021 on YouTube in Russia, as well as the most viewed in Ukraine.

== Charts ==
=== Weekly charts ===
Chart (2021)	Peak position
CIS Airplay (TopHit)	12
Russia Airplay (TopHit)	10
Ukraine Airplay (TopHit)	17

=== Monthly charts ===
Chart (2021)	Peak position
CIS (TopHit)	14
Russia Airplay (TopHit)	14
Ukraine Airplay (TopHit)	21

=== Year-end charts ===
Chart (2021)	Position
CIS (TopHit)	54
Russia Airplay (TopHit)	50
Ukraine Airplay (TopHit)	72
