= Boom Boom (Loboda and Pharaoh song) =

2020 single by Loboda and Pharaoh

Single by Loboda and Pharaoh
- Released: 31 July 2020
- Genre: Pop music
- Length: 3:44
- Label: Sony Music Russia
- Songwriters: Anatoly Alexeev; Vadim Chernyshev; Gleb Golubin
- Producer: Natella Krapivina (exec.)

Loboda singles chronology
"Moy" (2020)	"Boom Boom" (2020)	"Moloko" (2020)

Pharaoh singles chronology
"Amneziya" (2020)	"Boom Boom" (2020)	"Amy" (2021)

Music video
- "Boom Boom" on YouTube

"Boom Boom" is a song by Ukrainian singer Loboda and Russian rapper Pharaoh. It was released on July 31, 2020 by Sony Music.

== Track listing ==
"Boom Boom" - Digital download and streaming
No.	Title	Length
1.	"Boom Boom"	3:44

"Boom Boom" (Remixes) - Digital download and streaming
No.	Title	Length
1.	"Boom Boom" (Zeuskiss Remix)	2:43
2.	"Boom Boom" (Tomash Lukach Remix)	3:17
3.	"Boom Boom" (Daniel Hollins Remix)	3:16

== Charts ==
Chart (2020)	Peak position
Ukraine Airplay (TopHit)	43

== Release history ==
Region	Date	Format	Version	Label	Ref.
Various	31 July 2020	Digital download; streaming	Original	Sony Music	
CIS	31 July 2020	Airplay	Original	Sony Music	
Various	7 October 2020	Digital download; streaming	Remixes	Sony Music	
CIS	9 October 2020	Airplay	Remixes	Sony Music	

== Cover versions and other ==
- The musicians of the band Kuwalda made a cover of this song in the style of industrial-metal with alternative lyrics dedicated to the dictatorship, and shot a video.
- American drag queen Katya Zamolodchikova recorded the song "Ding Dong!" for her debut EP Vampire Fitness. "Ding Dong!" is an homage to "Boom Boom".
