= Pharaoh (rapper) =

Russian rapper (born 1996)

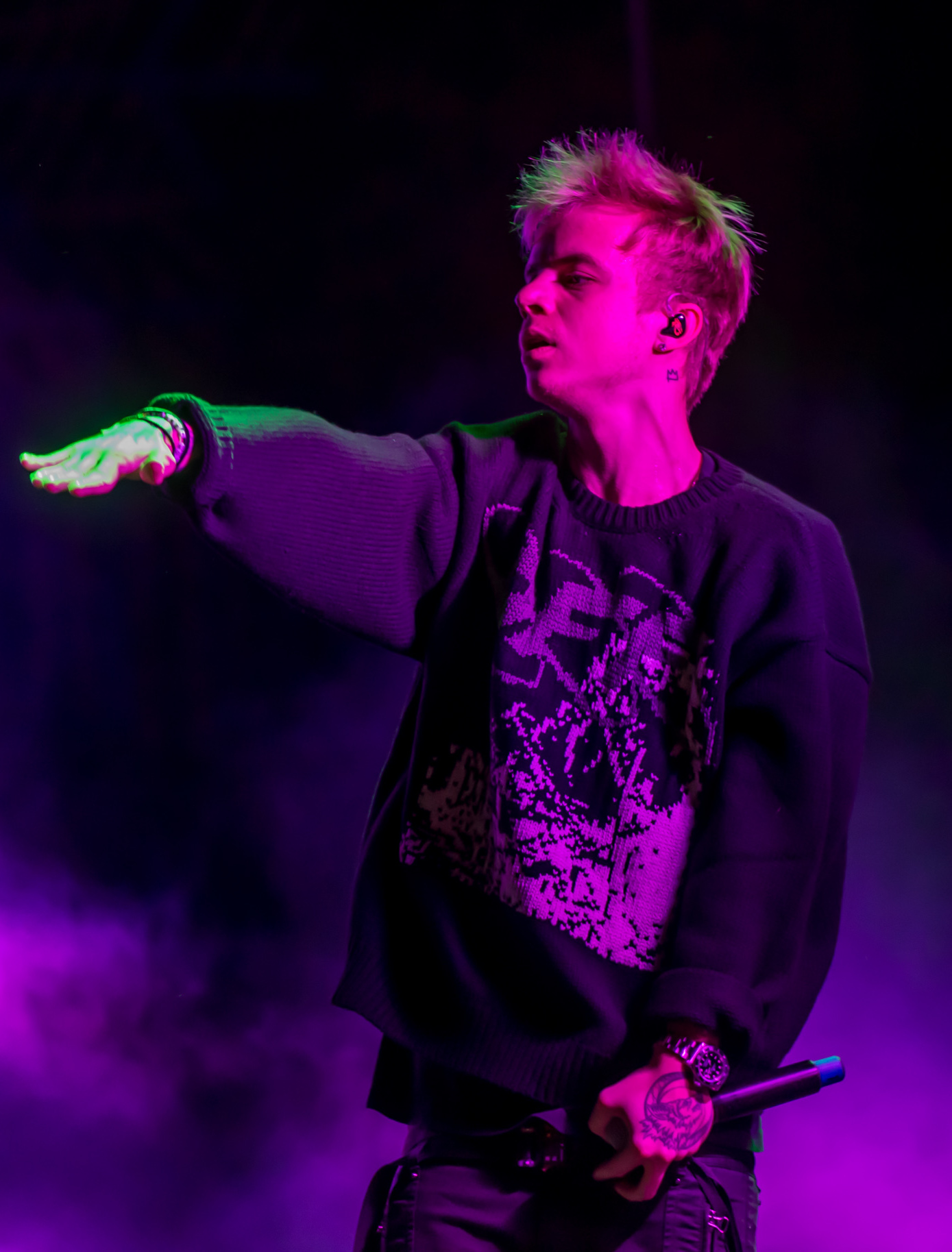
- Pharaoh in September 2019

Background information
- Also known as: ColdSiemens (current), ~~Castro The Silent~~, ~~Lord Cvstro~~, MSHRMS, Leroy Kid (former)
- Born: Gleb Gennadievich Golubin; January 30, 1996 (age 30); Moscow, Russia
- Genres: Trap; Rap; Cloud rap; Emo rap
- Occupations: Rapper; music producer; songwriter
- Years active: 2012-present

Gleb Gennadievich Golubin (Russian: Глеб Генна́дьевич Голýбин; born 30 January 1996), otherwise known as Pharaoh, is a Russian rapper. He is associated with the subgenre of cloud rap and has been labeled one of its principal innovators in Russia.

== Early life ==
Pharaoh is the son of football official Gennady Golubin. He was born in Moscow on January 30, 1996. From 2002 to 2013, he studied at Gymnasium No. 1409; later he was admitted to the Faculty of Journalism at Moscow State University, which he graduated from in 2017. His musical tastes were formed under the influence of the music of the band Rammstein and rapper Snoop Dogg, and to a lesser extent, T.I. In later interviews, he named Kurt Cobain, Marilyn Manson, and Kid Cudi as his favorite musicians. Gleb made his first recordings in a home studio belonging to his friends.

== Career ==
=== 2014–2015: «Уаджет», Phlora и Dolor ===
For some time, Pharaoh was a member of the musical group Grindhouse. Pharaoh's first recording was the song "Cadillac", recorded at his friends' studio in late 2013. The musician first became famous after the video for the song "Nothing Has Changed" was released in February 2014, followed by the mixtape "Wadget" in the spring. In August of the same year, Pharaoh also published a second mixtape, called Phlora.

In the summer of 2015, the mixtape Dolor (from Latin - "pain") was released. Critics, according to whom Pharaoh and similar musicians are a mixture of Justin Bieber and Kurt Cobain, wrote that there is nothing behind the musicians' work, but the music is extremely relevant and in demand among young people. In the fall of the same year, a joint mixtape by Pharaoh and i61, a member of the Ufa association Dopeclvb, was released under the name Rage Mode (Rare Action). According to the editors of the Rap.ru portal, Dolor was included in the top twenty albums of 2015.

It gained a new wave of popularity in mid- to late 2015, when the videos for the singles "Black Siemens" and "Champagne Squirt" began to be actively discussed on the Internet. Before the video was deleted, "Black Siemens" managed to collect about 10 million views on YouTube, and the main words from the chorus of the song - "Skr-skr-skr" - became a kind of Internet meme and found a certain response in social media. As Pharaoh himself explains the meaning invested in the composition: ""Skr" is the sound that Bruce Lee made when doing techniques."

=== 2016: Phosphor, Cake Factory ===
In April 2016, the first single of the same name from the new mixtape Phosphor was released, which served as an announcement of the mixtape itself. In May, the second single, titled "Let's Stay Home," was released; in the same month, Pharaoh announced on his Twitter account that the new album would have 18 tracks and would be released in June. However, the mixtape was not released in June, and in early July, the rapper himself and several members of Dead Dynasty reported technical problems, due to which the release had to be postponed for a while.

On July 14, 2016, the Phosphor mixtape was released to the public. The album featured YungRussia colleagues, as well as Scriptonite, with whom Pharaoh had already released a joint song at the end of last year.

The release of a joint mini-album with LSP, "Konditerskaya", was scheduled for the fall of 2016 in support of the joint Cake Factory tour. The duo had previously released one of the songs from this album, entitled "Keks".

=== 2017: Pink Phloyd ===
On July 8, 2017, Pharaoh's fifth solo mixtape, Pink Phloyd, was released, featuring 14 songs and 1 bonus track - a remix of "Porn Star" from a joint mini-album with LSP, but without Oleg's parts. Vocals for the artist's next musical release were provided by the rap group the Chemodan, rappers Morty Mort and 39, as well as artists such as Acid Drop King, Boulevard Depo, Mnogoznaal and Noa. The instrumentals feature beatmakers Dexter Dukarus and Shadow Playaz, and Dead Dynasty sound producers Yung Meep, White Punk, Noa, Lostsvund, Stereoryze, Dimvrs, Fortnox Pockets, Cheney Weird and Crazie Mugg.

=== 2018 Redrum и Phuneral ===
On February 3, 2018, Pharaoh announced the album on his Twitter page, posting an image with the word "REDRUM" scratched into a door and the caption "??.??.2018". The image itself is a still from the cult film "The Shining", based on the book by Stephen King and directed by American and British film director Stanley Kubrick. The inscription on the door is an inverted word MURDER, meaning "murder". On February 24, Pharaoh announced the final part of the tour, which took place from autumn to early winter 2017, on his Twitter page, and on March 4, Pharaoh announced the full list of cities. The concerts are scheduled to take place in Ukraine, Sweden, the Czech Republic, Germany, Slovakia, Austria, Moldova, Belarus, Israel, Estonia and Latvia. The final concert of the tour is scheduled for Vilnius, the capital of Lithuania.

On April 14, 2018, Pharaoh released a 6-track mini-album called REDЯUM (Dullboy EP). Production was handled by WhitePunk and FrozenGangBeatz.

On August 24, 2018, he released his seventh mixtape, Phuneral. The mixtape included the single "Smart", released on August 8, 2018. The mixtape took 1st place on the Apple Music chart in Russia and 2nd place on the iTunes chart in Russia.

=== 2020: «Правило», «Boom Boom» ===
After releasing the single "Not on the Way" in October 2018, Pharaoh went into a long creative lull.

On June 7, 2019, Pharaoh posted several messages on his Twitter account indicating that he was fully immersed in the process of creating the album.

On June 8, 2019, during the Esquire Weekend concert in support of the magazine, Pharaoh confirmed that he was indeed working on an album with Bright, the beatmaker of Dead Dynasty.

On August 15, 2019, Pharaoh reminded us via Instagram Stories that he was continuing to work on the release. On October 8, 2019, Pharaoh once again reminded us that work was underway on the album by publishing a post on Instagram.

On November 5, 2019, Pharaoh announced on Instagram Stories that we shouldn't expect any material from him until 2020. It is unknown whether it will be an album or separate singles.

On January 14, 2020, Pharaoh posted an excerpt from the song "Because of You" on Instagram Stories.

On February 26, 2020, Pharaoh announced on his Twitter account that the album release was in the final stages and would be released very soon.

On March 1, 2020, Pharaoh posted a photo on his Instagram account, stating that work on the album was finished. On March 12, 2020, Pharaoh tweeted to Bright to finish his work on the release. Bright later posted a post on Instagram Stories stating that his work on the album was finished.

On March 13, 2020, as the artist had promised earlier, he announced the release date on his Instagram – March 27. The title of the long-awaited release was also presented – "Rule".

Since March 22, 2020, Pharaoh began a daily countdown to the album's release. And at midnight on March 27, 2020, the long-awaited album was released. And immediately after the album's release, Pharaoh announced a deluxe edition of the release.

On July 31, 2020, the most unexpected collaboration of this summer was released - one of the leaders of the Ukrainian pop scene - Svetlana Loboda recorded a joint song with Pharaoh, who, 2 months after the release of the album "Rule", decided not to change his updated pop sound in this song.

=== 2021: Million Dollar Depression ===
On March 27, 2020, immediately after the release of the album "Rule", Pharaoh wrote a tweet stating that work is underway on a deluxe edition of this album.

On May 9, 2020, Pharaoh tweeted and said that the deluxe version would be coming soon.

On July 15, 2020, Pharaoh announced that the deluxe edition of the album "Rule" will not be released due to the fact that Pharaoh decided to turn it into a separate EP.

=== 2022: PHILARMONIA ===
On October 17, 2022, Pharaoh announced on his Instagram account and VKontakte group that he had completed 99% of work on his new album.

The album was released on November 25, 2022.

In 2022, Pharaoh won the Forbes 30 Under 30 Music nomination.

=== 2023: PHREQUENCY ===
On May 26, Pharaoh posted a story on his Instagram account: THIS SUMMER. PHREQUENCY. LEFTOVERS' S VIBE PLAYLIST.

On July 7, Pharaoh announced that he had shipped his new album, PHREQUENCY, to Threads.

On August 15, Pharaoh announced the album release date on his Instagram account and VKontakte group.

According to the artist: "PHREQUENCY is a playlist of tracks that are not going to go anywhere 2022 / 2023

On August 18, the album was released, the title of which is written in the artist's style, where he replaced the English letter "F" with "Ph", referring to his pseudonym.

=== 2024: OMEGA ===
One of the loudest collaborations on the Russian scene in 2024.

The track "OMEGA" is performed in an unusual opium sound for Pharaoh, which is connected with the invited American artist Destroy Lonely - a member of the famous Opium group. Such a collaboration was a huge surprise for the audience.

The song was first announced on December 1, 2023, at Pharaoh's concert in Tyumen:

"[...]. I'll give you a hint [about the performer on the feature]: he's part of an association called Opium. [...]"

Two days before the release, Pharaoh and the track's producer White Punk hid all their posts on Instagram, which served as a hint at the track's imminent release.

On August 30, 2024, "OMEGA" was officially released on all platforms.

For most fans, the collaboration between Pharaoh and White Punk was a bigger surprise, since they had been in conflict since 2018, than the feat with Destroy Lonely.

This is not the first time Pharaoh has released a song with a Western artist. For example, in 2018, Pharaoh collaborated with Ghostmain on the track "Blood Oceans (How Many?)".

=== 2025: «10:13» ===
At the end of 2024, the title of the future album was leaked «10:13». A little later, Pharaoh was noticed to have the same tattoo.

In February 2025, Pharaoh participated in the White Punk song «Sky», on the album «Vampire: Chapter Two».

At the end of March, another leak occurred. This time, the album cover and the first track, «Intro». This leak turned out to be false. The cover and track were false, but the track contained the phrase: "Gleb, there's still an hour and forty-seven minutes until midnight," which could be interpreted the other way around as 1 hour and 13, which, due to the similarity to 10:13, made think the leak was true.

The album was released on April 25 at 10:13 Moscow time «10:13».

The album also includes a feat with Destroy Lonely "OMEGA".

On July 15, 2025, Pharaoh published a snippet of the song in his telegram channel «Черные Вороны (Не До Абстракций II)».

== Personal life ==
In 2023, Pharaoh married Battle of Psychics member Sonya Egorova.

== Discography ==
=== Studio albums ===
- 2020 — «Правило»
- 2021 — «Million Dollar Depression»
- 2022 — «Philarmonia»
- 2025 — «10:13»

=== Mixtapes ===
- 2014 — «Уаджет»
- 2014 — «Phlora»
- 2015 — «Dolor»
- 2016 — «Плакшери» (with Boulevard Depo)
- 2016 — «Phosphor»
- 2017 — «Pink Phloyd»
- 2018 — «Phuneral»
- 2023 — «PHREQUENCY»

=== Mini-albums ===
- 2015 — Paywall (with Boulevard Depo)
- 2015 — Rage Mode (Rare Action) (with i61)
- 2016 — «Кондитерская» (with ЛСП)
- 2018 — Redrum (Dullboy EP)

=== Singles ===
- 2015 — «404»
- 2015 — «Black Siemens»
- 2016 — «X-Ray»
- 2016 — «Champagne Squirt» (feat. Boulevard Depo)
- 2016 — «Homeless God» (feat. Jeembo)
- 2016 — «Козловский» (feat. I61, Techno & Acid Drop King) [Remix]
- 2017 — «Герой» (feat. Mnogoznaal & Noggano)
- 2017 — «Unplugged (Interlude)» (feat. White Punk & Noa)
- 2017 — «Дико, например»
- 2017 — «Pronto» (with TECHNO)
- 2017 — «Unplugged 2: Love Kills» (feat. White Punk)
- 2017 — «Мой ангел убил себя, я не успел с ним попрощаться»
- 2017 — «Chainsaw» (with Jeembo)
- 2017 — «Caramel»
- 2017 — «Глушитель» (feat. ЛИЛ МОРТИ)
- 2017 — «УБИЙЦА»
- 2018 — «УЗЫ МОБА»
- 2018 — «На луне»
- 2018 — «Smart»
- 2018 — «Не по пути»
- 2019 — «Амнезия» (with ЛСП)
- 2020 — «Boom Boom» (with LOBODA)
- 2021 — «Эми»
- 2021 — «Перед смертью все равны»
- 2021 — «Всему cвое время»
- 2021 — «Акид» (with Mnogoznaal)
- 2022 — «Халливуд Хоус»
- 2022 — «Соната ей» / «Я потратил ночь на поиск»
- 2024 — «Цвет Золота» for Прелесть (series)
- 2024 — «OMEGA» (with Destroy Lonely)

==== As the guest singer ====
- 2014 — «Мне плевать» (with Superior.cat.proteus)
- 2015 — «Omega» (with Superior.cat.proteus) [Remix]
- 2017 — «BAPE» (with Lil Morty)
- 2021 — «Блэссд» (with 39)
- 2022 — «Не сегодня» (with Dima Roux)
- 2023 — «Лекарство» (with Loc-Dog)
- 2023 — «Топь» (with Loc-Dog)
- 2025 — «Небо» (with White Punk)
- 2025 — «Делай что можешь» (with Diana Arbenina)
