= Sold Out (Loboda album) =

EP by Loboda
- Released: 14 December 2019
- Genre: Pop
- Length: 32:45
- Label: Sony Music
- Producer: Natella Krapivina

Loboda chronology
H2LO (2017)	Sold Out (2019)	Superstar Show Live (2020)

Singles from Sold Out
- 1. "Novy Rim" Released: 6 December 2019

Professional ratings
Review scores
Source	Rating
InterMedia	7/10
Moskovsky Komsomolets	Unrated
MTV Russia	Unrated

Sold Out is the EP by Ukrainian singer Svetlana Loboda, released on 14 December 2019 by Sony Music.

== Overview ==
Svetlana Loboda announced the release of the new album in early 2019. During the summer, the singer actively recorded new material, working with former authors and new ones. In October, the singer posted photos from the recording studio.

On 29 November, the singer released the single "Mira malo", stating that this is a farewell to the familiar Loboda, and that completely new and unusual sound on the new album wait for us. On 6 December the singer released the single "Novy Rim", and on 7 December the track list and pre-order of the EP became available.

The album contains nine tracks, seven of them brand new. The album also included the previously released single "V zone riska", as well as a remix of the single "Instadrama", made by singer Maruv.

Sold Out was released on 14 December 2019. The album managed to reach the top positions of the iTunes charts in Russia, Kazakhstan and Ukraine. In less than two days, the album received more than three hundred thousand listens on the VK Music service, and a week later, the listens exceeded one million.

The EP received ZD Awards as Album of the Year.

== Track listing ==
No.	Title	Writer(s)	Length
1.	"Khirosima"	Artem Ivanov; Anatoly Alexeyev	2:49
2.	"Novy Rim"	Ivanov; Alexeyev	3:47
3.	"Siniye volny"	Ivanov; Yevgeny Bardachenko; Tomash Lukach	3:25
4.	"V zone riska"	Denis Kovalsky	3:24
5.	"Bon appétit"	Alexeyev	3:30
6.	"Skazochny dom"	Ivanov; Alexeyev	4:10
7.	"Plokhoy" (featuring Ivanov)	Ivanov	3:53
8.	"#1"	Nikolay Khristov	3:53
9.	"Insta" (remix by Maruv)	Andrey Frolov; Mikhail Boosin; Anna Korsun; Nikolay Bukarev	3:53
