= Svetlana Loboda =

Ukrainian singer (born 1982)

Svetlana Loboda Світлана Лобода
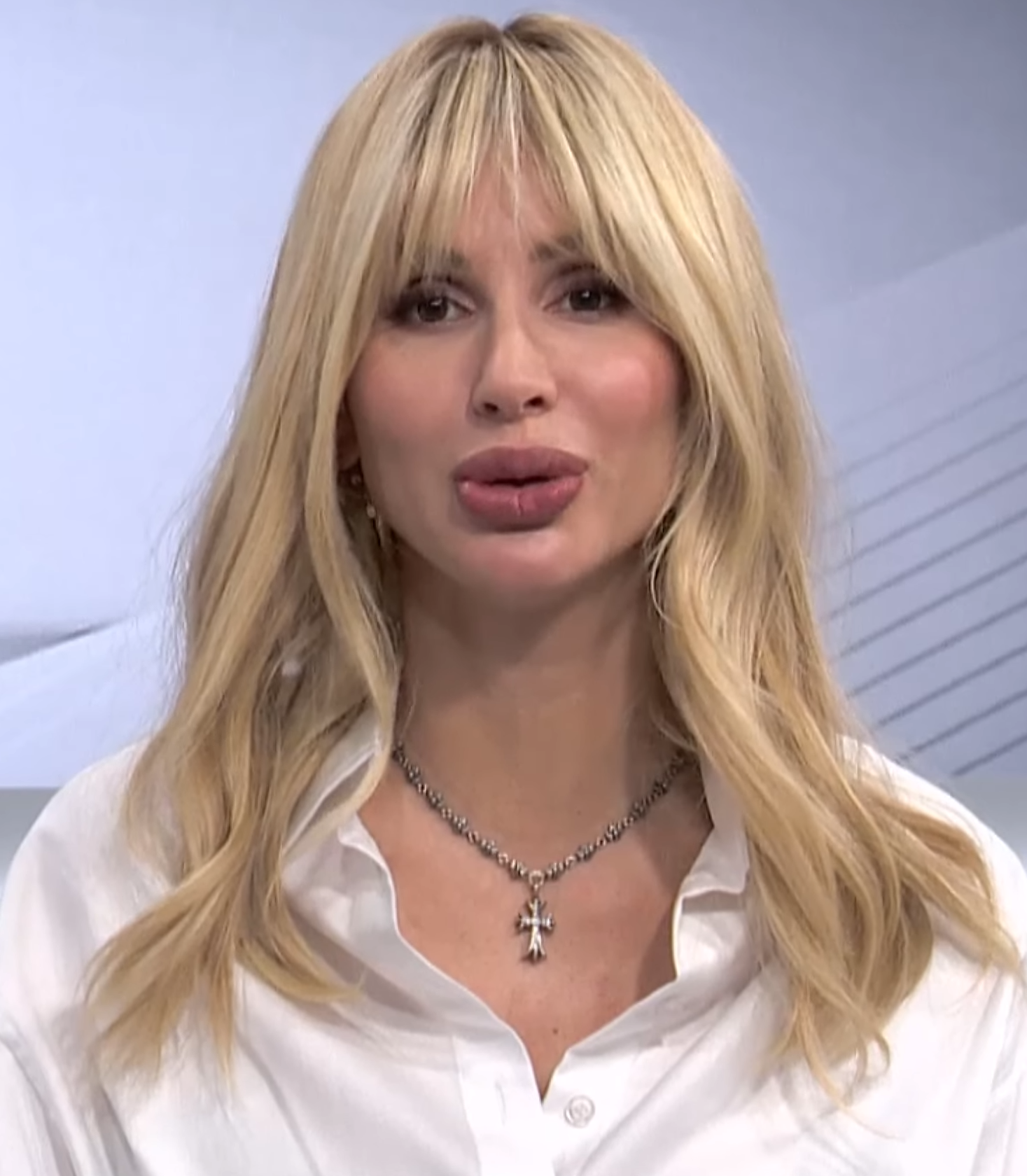
- Loboda in 2023

Background information
- Also known as: Loboda, Alisiya Horn
- Born: Svitlana Serhiivna Loboda; 18 October 1982 (age 43); Irpin, Kyiv Oblast, Ukrainian SSR, Soviet Union
- Genres: Pop; dance-pop
- Occupations: Singer; television presenter; actress; fashion designer
- Years active: 2000–present
- Labels: Moon; CD Land; Союз; Sony Music
- Website: loboda.com

LOBODA's professional brand logo

Svetlana Serhiivna Loboda (Ukrainian: Світлана Сергіївна Лобода; Russian: Светлана Сергеевна Лобода, romanized: Svetlana Sergeyevna Loboda; born 18 October 1982), mononymously known as Loboda (often stylized in all-caps), is a Ukrainian singer and songwriter. During her career, Loboda has achieved international success in Eastern European countries. Winner of the ZD Awards and Bravo International Professional Music Awards.

== Biography ==
=== Early life ===
Svetlana Loboda was born on 18 October 1982, in Oleksandrivskaya Clinical Hospital (now known as St. Michael's Clinical Hospital) in Kyiv, in the family of Serhii and Natalia Loboda. Until 1989, she lived with family in Irpin (Kyiv region), where the singer spent her childhood. She graduated from a music school in the classes of piano, conducting, and academic vocal.

After receiving her first musical education, she entered the Kyiv Variety and Circus Academy in the Variety Vocal Department. Already in the first year, Svetlana became a member of the musical group "Cappuccino", which occupied a worthy place on the Ukrainian stage. However, she later realized that it was not quite her format and left the group at the end of her contract.

Also, Loboda participated in the first Ukrainian musical "Equator" (directed by Viktor Shulakov), where she got one of the main roles — the savage Mirana. After the premiere of Equator, Loboda was talked about in Ukraine as a rising star.

For the period of the musical, a song and video — "Black Angel", recorded and filmed with Svetlana Loboda, were released in wide rotation.

=== VIA Gra/Nu Virgos ===
On 28 December 2003, Loboda created her own band called Ketch. In the spring of 2004, having passed a casting, Loboda became a new soloist of the trio "VIA Gra". As a member of the group, she took part in a tour across Asian cities, and starred in the music video "Biology" and the New Year musical "Sorochynskyi Yarmarok" by Inter. Three months later, Svetlana left the band and in December she released her first single, "Black and White Winter".

In November 2005, Loboda's first solo album, “You Will Not Forget”, was released.

In 2006, the music video and then the single "Black Angel" was released, and after a trip to Japan, Loboda recorded the song "Wait, man". The same year, she hosted the show Shoumaniya on Novy Channel, and in 2007, she became the host of “Miss CIS” on TET. She opened her own travel agency, Happy Vacations. In October 2007, the music video for the lyric song "Happiness" was released. On October 18, 2007, Loboda organized a photo exhibition of her own photos dedicated to India. The aim of the exhibition is to help orphans and children with cancer. In 2008, the creation of a collection of youth clothes "F*ck the macho" began, in the same year the second album "Not Macho" was released. On October 18, Loboda won the National Olympus Award in the category "Original Performance Style".

=== Eurovision 2009 ===
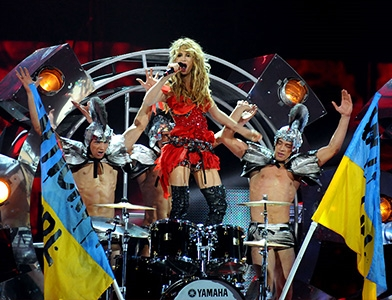
Loboda performing during the second semi-final of Eurovision 2009

In 2009, "Be My Valentine" was submitted for the Ukrainian qualifying round of the Eurovision Song Contest 2009. On 8 March, Loboda won the 2009 Eurovision qualifying round and got the right to represent Ukraine in the final part of the contest. On 18 March, she presented her music video "Be My Valentine" (Anti-crisis girl!).

At the opening ceremony of Eurovision 2009, Loboda appeared in bandages and with abrasions on her body, make-up designed to draw attention to her "Say Stop Domestic Violence" initiative. Subsequently, French singer Patricia Kaas joined this campaign.

Loboda took 12th place in the final of the contest with 76 points. The low final positions did not prevent her from taking first places at the preliminary competition concerts in London, Paris, and Amsterdam. According to the statistics of search queries from the countries participating in Eurovision, Svetlana Loboda took 4th place in the Google ranking. In 2009, Loboda created "Anti-crisis boy" T-shirts and "Anti-crisis bag", for the contest.

=== 2010-2015: Growing Popularity ===
In January 2010, the video for the song "Live Easy" was released, where Loboda appears as the fat girl she became after her failure at Eurovision. Following "Live Easy", Loboda recorded a duet song "Heart Beats" with Max Barskikh, and soon a video was released.

In 2010, Svetlana Loboda officially renamed her musical project and registered the brand and uses her last name under the trademark LOBODA.

In April 2011, Svetlana Loboda together with soccer player Andriy Shevchenko became the faces of the PEPSI campaign in the project "Pepsi Refresh Project", the essence of which was to help young creative people find their way in life. The video for the project was shot by the British-American director Nick Lively, who flew to Ukraine especially to work on this project.

In the summer of 2010, the single "Revolution" was released. At the VIVA Awards, Loboda presented the single "Thank You" dedicated to her daughter. The song's video was filmed in two stages: the first part of the shoot was held when the singer was nine months pregnant, and the second part was after she gave birth. In the summer of 2011, the premiere of the song "In the Light" took place on the Crimea Music Fest stage. Later, Loboda presented a music video. In early 2012, Loboda went to the United States, where she shot a music video for the single "Clouds" and a short film in the genre of suspense based on the musical work "Clouds" — "Woman-Crime". The film was filmed in Miami. The director and cameraman was Vladimir Shklyarevsky. The leitmotif of the film was a 19th-century work entitled "Woman, Criminal and Prostitute" by Italian author Cesare Lombroso, a prison psychiatrist, which reveals the theme of the crime of passion.

On 12 April 2012, Loboda presented the show "The Beginning" in Crystal Hall, with which she toured Ukraine for almost a year. In June, a video for the song What about U, recorded for the EURO 2012 championship, was released. This song was selected among hundreds of others, submitted to the court of the UEFA European Commission, and was included in the official track list of the championship. In August 2012, the lyric composition "40 degrees" was presented at the Crimea Music Fest. In 2012, Loboda became a coach in the talent show "Voice. Children" on 1+1 channel. In February 2013, she presented a new single, "Tenderness". On 17 March 2013, the singer presented a new single called "Under Ice" during the "Yuna" Award.

At the end of June 2013, Loboda was awarded the honorary title "Honored Artist of Ukraine".

On 1 November 2013, she released the single "Kokhana" (Beloved), her first work in Ukrainian. On 13 and 14 February 2014, she performed at the 2014 BIG LOVE SHOW, where she performed the song "City Under Prohibition", and on 26 March 2014, the single was officially released. On 29 March, Loboda went on an all-Ukrainian tour "Under Prohibition!". On 22 May 2014, Loboda together with Emin presented a single and music video "Looking at the sky". The video was directed by Loboda producer Natella Krapivina. The production designer was Sergiy Ivanov, who worked on the film "Stalingrad". On 29 September 2014, Loboda and Emin presented a remake of the track "Looking at the Sky". On 18 October 2014, the single "Don't Need It" was premiered. She got the YUNA nomination for Best Female Performer and Best Song ("Clouds"), and had victory in the Red Star. "40 Degrees" was included in the 20 Best Songs list and named the Song of the Year (Ukraine). Loboda was awarded Fashion People Awards for Fashion Video "40 Degrees".

On 26 December 2014, Loboda won the 2014 Song of the Year award for her single "City Under Prohibition". Yuna nominated Best Singer, Best Lyricist and won Best Song ("40 Degrees"), Best Video ("40 Degrees"). On 7 March 2015, Loboda presented a new music video for the song "Not Wanted". The video was filmed in Portugal. The video shows a difficult story of a woman, who, overcoming pain and infidelity, is fighting for her fragile female happiness. The video is largely a reflection of the singer's personal experiences with her breakup with the man she loves.

On 26 March 2015, the YUNA 2015 awards ceremony was held at the Palace of Ukraine, where Loboda and Emin won the "Best Duet" category for their joint creation "You Look at the Sky."

On 2 April 2015, the single "Time to Go Home" premiered on Russian Radio. The music video of this song was filmed in Istanbul, directed by Natella Krapivina. On 20 May 2015, the premiere of the music video "Time to go home" was held with the participation of "Eagle and Tails" show hosts Andrii Bedniakov, Lesya Nikityuk, Regina Todorenko, and Zhanna Badoeva. On 8 June 2015, the 6th annual Fashion People Awards ceremony was held in Moscow, where Loboda won in the Fashion Voice Woman category.

On 4 November 2015, Loboda embarked on a tour of cities in Ukraine with the show "Time to Go Home." During the tour, she presented new songs "To Hell with Love", "Angelok", "Your Eyes" and "Don't Love". On 23 November 2015, on the eve of the International Day for the Protection of Women from Violence (25 November), she presented a social art project for her second Ukrainian-language composition "Oblysh," (Leave me alone) a message designed to draw attention to one of the most important issues: violence against women.

On 26 November 2015, the first M1 Music Awards 2015 ceremony was held at the Palace of Sports in Kyiv, where Loboda won in the "Clip of the Year" category with the video "Time to Go Home." On 28 and 29 November 2015, solo concerts were held at the Palace of Ukraine in honor of the singer's tenth anniversary. In December, according to Yandex research, the singer became the most popular woman in Ukraine.

=== Since 2016: H2LO, "Voice. Children" and other projects ===
On 11 January 2016, Loboda presented the song "To Hell the Love," and on 19 February 2016, she premiered the music video. On 9 May 2016, she opened the concert of the Inter TV channel, dedicated to the 71st anniversary of Victory in the Great Patriotic War, singing Bulat Okudzhava's song "Our Tenth Paratrooper Battalion". She closed the concert with the military song "Cranes".

On 30 June 2016, the Organizing Committee of the international Miss Ukraine Universe 2016 contest officially recognized Loboda as the brightest representative of the music industry and awarded the title "The Most Beautiful Singer of the Country". On 6 September 2016, the single "Your Eyes" premiered, and on 9 November 2016, the music video premiered. The single held the lead in iTunes in the CIS for five weeks. On 19 November 2016, she received a Golden Gramophone statuette in Moscow for her song "To Hell with Love."

Winning 2016: M1 Music Awards best singer and music video of the year.

On 8 March 2017, Loboda created a three-hour show at the Palace of Sports in Kyiv and presented the album H2LO, which she had been working on for five years. Seven new singles were played that night: "Paris", "Bride", "Accidental", "Bitch" and others. On the first day after the album was officially premiered on iTunes, H2LO hit the first line of the chart in seven countries: Ukraine, Lithuania, Latvia, Estonia, Russia, Belarus, and Kazakhstan.

In addition, this concert premiered her duet titled "Hot" with Dima Monatik. The history of cooperation between the artists began with the track "40 degrees", the author of which was Dima.

In December 2017, she became the host of the "star" edition of the travel show "Oryol i Reshka" together with Alexander Revva. In 2018, she was the music producer of Philip Kirkorov's single "The Color of Mood Blue". She won at the RU.TV Awards 2017 as Best Female Performer, Best Creative ("Your Eyes"), Muz-TV Awards 2017as the Best Female Performer.

In March 2018, the second "Heat Music Awards" was held, where the singer received the award — Best Female Performer. On 10 March 2018, at the Bravo Awards, the singer receives the award for Best Album and Best Singer from the hands of Eros Ramazzotti. And she also confirmed the information that she is pregnant, and said that she is taking a break from concert activities because of this.

In May 2018, Svetlana Loboda starred on the cover of the May issue of the Russian edition of Cosmopolitan.

In June 2018, two weeks after the birth of her second daughter, the singer returned to the stage and performed at the "Muz-TV Award" with a rousing show and received the award of Best Singer.

Also, this year the album "H2LO" 3× PLATINUM, the single "Your Eyes" sold 20 million copies sold/20× PLATINUM.

And in September of the same year, Svetlana Loboda graced the cover of the September issue of GQ, becoming the first woman to star on the cover of a men's magazine.

In December 2018, at the Russian national music awards "Victoria" the singer received the award — Best Dance Hit ("SuperStar"). At the same time, she got the “Golden Gramophone" for the Best Song ("SuperStar"), Yandex Music Award as the Performer of the Year, and Pop Singer of the Year.

"SuperStar" was dedicated as the loudest statement and chosen as "Song of the Year".

In 2019, became one of the mentors of the show "The Voice. Children" on Channel One. On March 1, 2019, the song "The Last Hero" premiered and became the title theme of the new season of the reality show of the same name. After the scandal of the voting results of the show "Voice. Children", the producer of the singer, announced the end of her work in the project.

In 2019, Svetlana Loboda gave several spectacular concerts as part of her large-scale show "SUPERSTAR". A year later, the singer released a live album Superstar Show Live, which included live versions of the hits "Tequila Love", "Your Eyes", "In the Risk Zone", "To Hell with Love" and others.

In November 2019, Svetlana Loboda starred in Till Lindemann's music video "Frau & Mann".

At the end of 2019, the singer presented the album "Sold Out", which went triple platinum. At the end of the year, the singer became the best streaming artist on the Sony Music Entertainment Russia label. That year, she received the following awards, Bravo Award — Song of the Year — "SuperStar", Heat Music Awards — Best Singer, Muz TV Award — Best Female Artist, Ru TV Award — "Cinema and Music" — "Fly" (OST "Gogol.Viy") - Best singer, "Golden Gramophone" — Best Song ("INSTADRAMA"), "Song of the Year" — Best Song — "Bullet Fool."

In 2020, Loboda, together with the rapper Pharaoh, released the track "Boom Boom" and the music video for it, both became the subject of controversy and discussions online, nevertheless, on the first day the video gained more than two million views and the song itself received platinum status in Russia. In December, the singer presented the song "Moloko", which was able to enter the top 40 radio charts in Russia and Ukraine, and also received platinum status. According to TopHit Music Awards, Loboda was recognized as the best radio performer in Russia for 2020.

In 2021, it became known that Svetlana Loboda would return to the "Voice. Children" as a mentor in the eighth season. The winner of the season was Vladislav Tyukin, whose mentor was Svetlana Loboda.

On 5 March 2021, Svetlana Loboda's video for the song "Native" premiered performing and receiving the statuette "ZHARA music awards" as the best singer of the year at the gala-concert of the opening of the international music festival "ZHARA-2021".

On 17 March 2021, Loboda was nominated for the Muz-TV Awards in the categories of Best Female Video, Best Female Performer, Best Song, Best Album, and Best Video. The award ceremony will sum up the results of the two years, as last year the music award was not held due to the epidemiological situation in the country.

On 8 June 2021, Loboda's producer Natella Krapivina announced that she was ending her collaboration with the performer.

On 16 July, the premiere of the new single and video of Loboda called "Allo" took place. The music video was directed by Alan Badoev, and the song became a hit during the fickle quarantine summer. The shooting took place in Kyiv.

On 13 August, the singer presented a new single "Indie Rock (Vogue)" in an unusual for her style, which was released in two languages: Russian and Ukrainian. The authors of the single were Alexander Horoshkovaty and Yuri Andriychenko. The music video was directed by Israeli Indi Hait, who had previously collaborated with numerous European stars. Ukrainian model Tanya Ruban took part in the shooting.

On 14 August, Loboda gave her first public concert in Ukraine for the first time in four years in Odesa at the club IBIZA, gathering a full house.

On 1 October, she presented a new lyrical single, "Americano". The author of the song is Nikita Kiselev. The track "Americano" instantly took the first position in all the charts, and for a long time was number one in the "trending" tab of YouTube music videos.

On 1 November, the premiere of the music video for the single "Americano" was held, the shooting of which took place in Kyiv, and the director of the video was Indi Hait.

On 10 December 2021, Loboda presented the single for the New Year — "ZanesLO", listening to which you want to dance, decorate the Christmas tree, buy presents, remember your loved one and just feel the comfort of your home.

Loboda received the Ukrainian "Music Platform" award from the TV channel "Ukraine" for the song "MoLOko".

=== Since 2022 ===
In February 2022, Loboda ceased cooperation with the Russian Federation when Russia invaded her home country of Ukraine, canceling a scheduled concert tour. Loboda voiced support of her native country. She began sharing regular updates of the war and how it affected Ukrainians on her social media, as well as actively promoting charitable activities related to Ukrainian relief.

Starting in February 2022, Loboda reoriented her office into a volunteer headquarters to help Ukrainians.

On 3 June 2022, the Loboda released her first song since the start of the war, dedicating it to Ukraine. According to the artist, "Prayer" is not a song, but a statement and an attempt to say for yourself that love will definitely defeat death, and "light will defeat darkness". The music video for the single "Prayer" was filmed in Riga, Latvia, in St. Peter's Church. Besides Loboda, 45 musicians from the Jāzeps Vītols Latvian Academy of Music Symphony Orchestra take part in the video. A Ukrainian and Latvian team worked on the song and video, which was directed by Indi Hait. The author of the idea of the video and the sound producer of the track is Loboda.

On 18 November, Loboda presented a new lyrical Ukrainian-speaking single "Two strangers".

The singer said, that she dedicates the song to Ukrainians, who are currently experiencing separation from their loved ones, children, parents, loved ones, and, of course, their country and home. Visiting centers for Ukrainian refugees around the world and talking in person, Loboda put everything she heard into the lyrics: both grief and pain.

On 2 December 2022, Loboda presented a music video for the song "Cities". For the first time, Loboda directed her own music video. As the singer herself noted:

"Separation has knocked on the door of many Ukrainians today, the song 'Cities' is exactly about it. 'Cities' is about feelings, separation, and distance, which today is measured not in kilometers, but in days until we meet".

The music video was shot in Riga, Latvia and featured local actors. The cameraman was Phil Lee, who flew in from America, especially for the shooting. It was reported to show about how pain and suffering makes people different, and how, after surviving this hell of war, destruction, and inner pain, one comes back from there to your cities, to your home.

On 3 February 2023, the singer released her fourth single after 24 February 2022. The song "Ukrainian Way" became the lead single on the artist's new album, which is expected to premiere as early as spring 2023.

On October 2 2025 Loboda released the single "Не мешай" (Don't disturb).

== Personal life ==
Her grandfather — Vasyl Loboda — worked in the Soviet Militsiya, then in the KGB, traveled around the world and in 1958 lived more than half a year in Cuba. At the time, when Fidel Castro and Che Guevara were preparing for a revolution, he lived in the jungle and helped develop plans to overthrow Cuban dictator Fulgencio Batista. Vasyl Loboda died when Svetlana was young.

Grandmother — Lyudmila Loboda was an opera singer.

Father — Serhii Loboda (born 1957) was the head of the apron service at an aircraft factory.

Mother — Natalia Loboda (born 1957) worked in Kyiv as a specialist in energy conservation. Was Irpin city council deputy.

Her younger sister is Ksenia Loboda (born 1992), married since June 2019, in March 2023 her first child (daughter) was born.

Former partner — Andrii Tsar (birth surname Onishchak, later he took his mother's maiden surname Levandovskyi ) (born September 18, 1987, Lviv, USSR)dancer, choreographer, worked with Svetlana Loboda Ballet and Freedom Ballet, DJ and singer. On 1 October 2014, the singer officially announced that she broke up with him.

Daughter — Evangelina Levandovska (born 9 April 2011 in Kyiv)

Daughter — Matilda (Tilda) Loboda (born 21 May 2018 in Los Angeles)

=== Charity ===
In April 2020, the singer, together with the Encore Charity Foundation in Russia and the Ukrainian Charity Exchange, launched the "Help Basket" campaign to support the elderly, low-income, and large families during the COVID-19 pandemic. The artist bought more than a thousand boxes of food for the funds and made a donation totaling more than 180 thousand rubles.

At the end of August 2021, in Odesa, she held a charity festival Vintage Charity Market & Sova Picnic, which was aimed at raising funds to purchase medical equipment for the children's hospital departments. The singer supported the initiative and donated a Balmain mini dress worth $3000.

On a regular basis, she helps sick children and needy families. Giving 10% of her profits to charity, as stated in Masha Efrosinina's "Exam" interview.

Since 24 February 2022, the singer reoriented her office into a volunteer headquarters to help Ukrainians. From the first days of the war, Loboda fully immersed herself in volunteer activities.

Loboda donated 1.5 million hryvnias to Masha Efrosinina Foundation (now dealing with humanitarian aid to war victims).

The singer donated a car for the needs of the tero-defense, and also paid for the purchase of necessary equipment for the city of Boryspil in the amount of 1.5 million hryvnias. This was told by the mayor of Boryspil, Volodymyr Borysenko.

In May 2022, the singer announced the opening of the Loboda Help Center, a center for psychological assistance to Ukrainians, as well as a center for receiving letters and applications for material assistance to residents of Ukraine affected by the war. Eight psychologists have been working at the center since it opened, and four are still working at the moment. About 1000 people got qualified psychological help thanks to the consultations of the specialists.

On 15 June 2022, she visited her native city Irpin, where she spent her childhood, and which became ruins after the Russian occupation. She met with the mayor Oleksandr Markushyn, visited several apartment buildings, kindergarten, and also Svetlana Loboda met with the residents of Irpin and those who wrote to her in the Loboda Help Center and asked for help, discussing the possibilities of restoring their ruined homes.

Svetlana Loboda donated three million hryvnias to complete the kindergarten "Vinochok" in Irpin in Kyiv region, part of the building was destroyed by Russian occupants.

Loboda visited the Kyiv City Children's Clinical Hospital #1. The star admitted that it was an incredible meeting with the young patients and medical staff. According to her words, such visits charge with incredible energy and courage. She also transferred to the account of the hospital about ₴200,000 for purchasing necessary medical equipment for the institution. Also, financial help was sent to the Paliativna hospital in Kyiv.

Svetlana Loboda financially supported a young Ukrainian tennis player, Mishel Lobotenko, who hails from Irpin. The 15-year-old schoolgirl and her family were forced to go to Latvia, where the athlete could not pay for training.

The singer, after visiting Irpin, where she saw with her own eyes what the Russian army left behind after the occupation, decided to help restore the city. And announced the cooperation with the International Charitable Foundation DUSHA.

Svetlana Loboda provided 350 refugees from a temporary camp for displaced persons in Pereiaslav, Boryspil district, with everything they needed for several months ahead. The artist bought for her compatriots, who became homeless because of the war, food, cleaning equipment, personal hygiene products, household chemicals, and much more in the amount of ₴230,000.

Svetlana Loboda provided her personal car to volunteer actor Alexei Surovtsev for the evacuation of animals from the city of Irpin, continues his mission to date.

On 14 August, Loboda's solo concert in Riga opened the large-scale charity tour to cities in Europe and America, which also included such countries as Kazakhstan, Uzbekistan, Israel and Armenia. At each concert, Loboda donates part of the money she makes to help rebuild her hometown of Irpin.

Also, as part of her tour, before almost every concert, the singer visited camps with Ukrainian refugees around the world to support them, as well as to donate tickets to her concerts.

On her birthday, 18 October 2022, the singer pledged a charitable donation of ₴1 million to repair roofs and reinforce multi-story buildings in the town of Irpin. As a result of the announced campaign, a total of ₴3 million was raised. Besides the Ukrainian construction charity fund Savehome.live joined the charitable initiative and took on the restoration of three multi-storey buildings — Fortuna, Stepanivska, and Vysokaya residential buildings.

On 26 December 2022, the main music channel of Kazakhstan, MUZZONE TV, awarded Svetlana Loboda the prize "For Contribution to the Development and Restoration of Ukraine".

Summing up the year 2022, since the beginning of the Russian invasion of Ukraine, the artist has transferred more than 14 million hryvnias for targeted assistance and to various charitable organizations.

In January 2023, the singer is continuing her charity work, having transferred ₴1 million for the reconstruction of a multi-storey building in Irpin, as well as announcing the continuation of a large-scale charity tour around the world.

== Discography ==
Studio albums

- Ty ne zabudesh (2005)
- Ne Ma4o (2008)
- H2LO (2017)
- Sold Out (2019)
- Made in U (2023)

== See also ==
- Loboda videography

Awards and achievements
Preceded by Ani Lorak with "Shady Lady"	Ukraine in the Eurovision Song Contest; 2009	Succeeded by Alyosha with "Sweet People"
