= Natella Krapivina =

Ukrainian producer and director (born 1982)

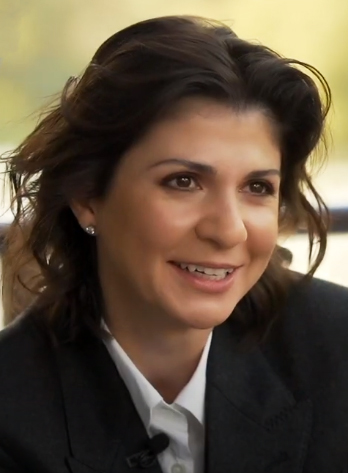
- Krapivina in 2020
- Born: Natella Vagif qizi Aliyeva; 7 April 1982 (age 43); Ashgabat, Turkmen SSR, USSR
- Education: Taras Shevchenko National University of Kyiv
- Occupations: Record producer; television producer; film producer; director
- Children: 1

Natella Vagifivna Krapivina (Ukrainian: Нателла Вагіфівна Крапівіна; Russian: Нателла Вагифовна Крапивина; née Aliyeva; Azerbaijani: Natella Vaqif qızı Əliyeva; born 7 April 1982) is a Ukrainian producer and director who is best known for working extensively with Ukrainian singer LOBODA. Krapivina additionally produces the Ukrainian travel show Oryol i Reshka and works with the television channels Inter in Ukraine and Pyatnica! in Russia.

== Early life ==
Krapivina was born in Ashgabat to an Azeri–Armenian family. Her father is Azerbaijani real estate developer Vagif Aliyev. Krapivina lived in Ashgabat until the age of eleven, later moving to Ukraine. In 2003, she graduated with a degree in international law from the Taras Shevchenko National University of Kyiv.

== Career ==
=== TeenSpirit Studio ===
While at the institute, Krapivina created her own production studio, which she called "TeenSpirit". She later launched the travel show "Oryol i Reshka". Together with partners Helen Synelnykova and Yevgen Synelnykov, they created a novelty on the Russian-speaking segment of Ukrainian television. TeenSpirit studio is also engaged in the production of videos and TV programs, among which the most popular are "Vokrug M" with Lesia Nikituk and "Kitchen with Dmitry Shepelev".

=== LOBODA ===
In 2010, Krapivina met Ukrainian singer-songwriter Svetlana Loboda, and has since become her record producer.

Krapivina on working with Loboda:

"She is the only artist on the Ukrainian scene that is capable of absolutely any experiments."

=== Gadar ===
In partnership with Loboda and her sound producer Mikhail Koshevoy, Krapivina founded the music label BogArt, which released the first single by rapper Gadar, titled "Не плачь".

The collaboration between LOBODA and Gadar is seen as the beginning of a popularization of urban culture in Ukraine.

== Projects ==
=== TeenSpirit Studio TV shows and TV projects ===
- "Oryol i Reshka" ("inter", "Pyatnica!", "K1")
- "Oryol i Reshka. Shopping" ("Inter", "Pyatnica!", "K1")
- "Vokrug M (Lesia Zdesia – in Russia)" ("Inter", "Pyatnica!")
- "Family dog" ("Inter")
- "Kitchen with Dmitry Shepelev" ("Inter")

=== TeenSpirit Studio films ===
- 2016 – Oryol i Reshka. New year ("Pyatnica!")

== Videography ==
2013

1. Svetlana Loboda – "Кохана"

2014

1. Svetlana Loboda – "Смотришь в небо" (feat. Emin)
2. Nyusha – "Только" / "Don't You Wanna Stay"

2015

1. Svetlana Loboda – "Не нужна", "Пора домой", "Облиш"

2016

1. Svetlana Loboda – "К чёрту любовь", "Твои глаза"
2. Gadar – "Не плачь"

2017

== Awards and nominations ==
=== Television projects ===
Year	Award	Category	Name	The result
2014	TEFI	Entertainment program "lifestyle"	"Орел и решка. На краю света"	Won
2015	Teletriumph	Infotainment program	"Орел и решка"	Won
2016	TEFI	Entertainment program "lifestyle"	"Орел и решка. Кругосветка"	Won
2016	Teletriumph	Infotainment program	"Орел и решка"	Won

=== Videos ===
Year	Award	Category, work	The result
2015	Yuna	Best music video ("Смотришь в небо" feat. EMIN)	Nominated
2015	M1 Music Awards	Clip of the year ("Пора домой")	Won
2016	Yuna	Best music video ("Пора домой")	Nominated
2016	RU.TV Awards-2016	Video on the road ("Пора домой")	Nominated
2016	M1 Music Awards	Clip of the year ("К чёрту любовь")	Won
2017	Yuna	Best music video ("К чёрту любовь")	Expected
