= Kyiv Television and Radio Center =

Famous building in Ukraine

- Ukrainian: Київський телерадіоцентр, romanized: Kyivskyi teleradiotsentr
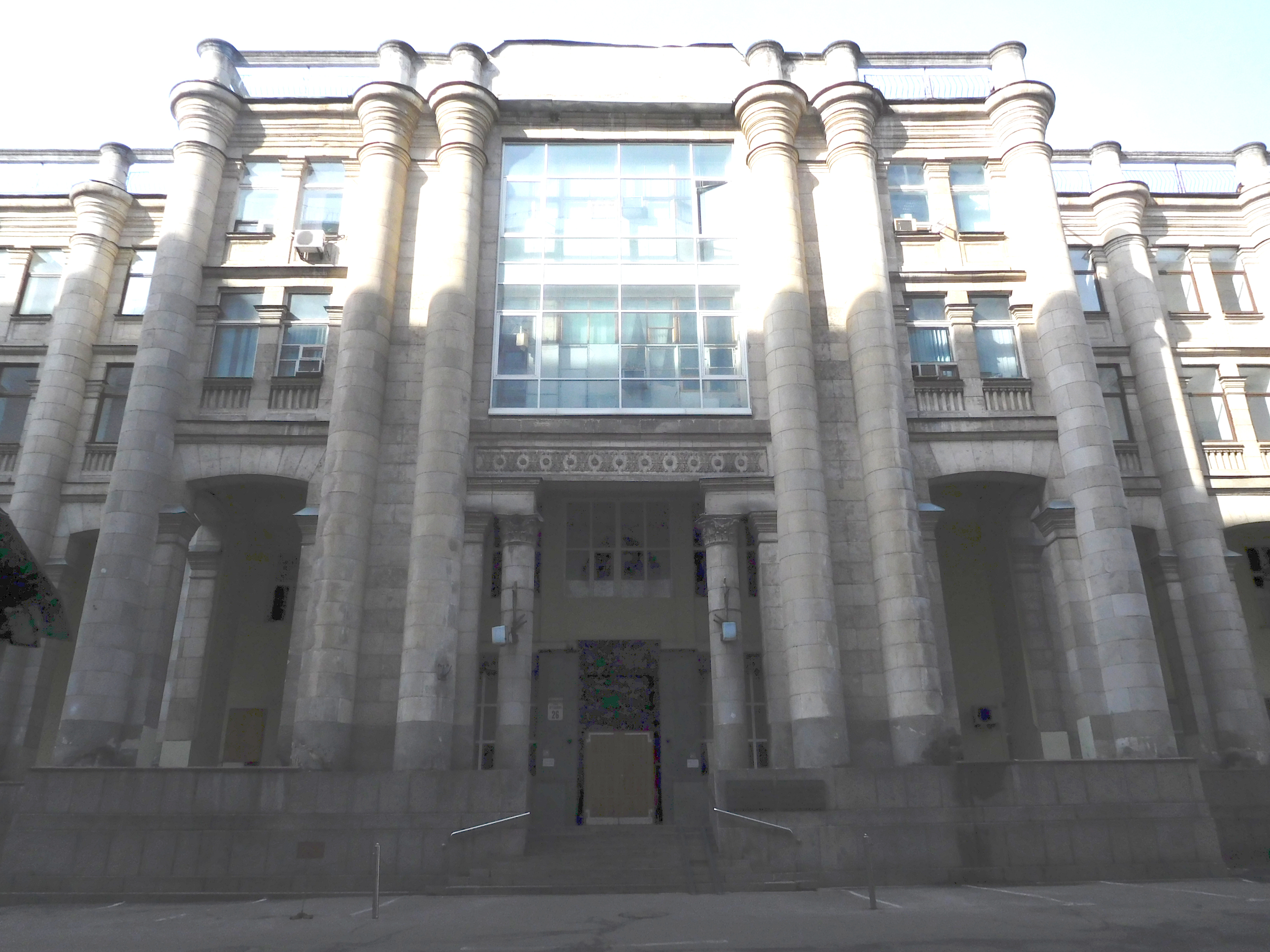
- Interactive map of the Kyiv Television and Radio Center area

General information
- Architectural style: Ретроспективізм
- Location: Kyiv
- Coordinates: 50.448611°N 30.521389°E
- Current tenants: Radio Ukraine
- Groundbreaking: 1949
- Opened: 1951
- Owner: Public Broadcasting Company of Ukraine

Design and construction
- Architect: Viktor Yelizarov
- First director, Konstantin Alekseev

The Kyiv Television and Radio Center, known more commonly since the dissolution of the USSR as the House of Ukrainian Radio (Ukrainian: Будинок Українського радіо, romanized: Budynok Ukrainskoho radio), was built on the site of Khreshchatyk 26, which had been largely destroyed by deliberately placed Soviet secret service bombs targeting Germans in the 1941 bombings of Khreshchatyk Street during World War II. Construction of the TV and Radio center which replaced the former complex at Khreshchatyk 26 began in 1949, at the insistence of Nikita Khrushchev, who at that time was the economic leader of Ukraine.

Joseph Stalin authorized 43 million rubles to complete the structure – but since all contact with American TV companies had ceased shortly after the beginning of the Cold War (including the company that had won the contract to construct the Moscow TV Center), a Russian immigrant and electronics engineer named Vladimir Zvorykin had to design everything in the building himself. The building was designed by the famous Soviet architect Viktor Yelizarov. Today, the Radio and TV building at Khreshchatyk 26 is no longer visible from the main thoroughfare of Khreshchatyk, and is only accessible through the archway of Khreshchatyk 24.

== History ==
=== The fires of Kyiv, and the destruction of the former Khreshchatyk 26 ===
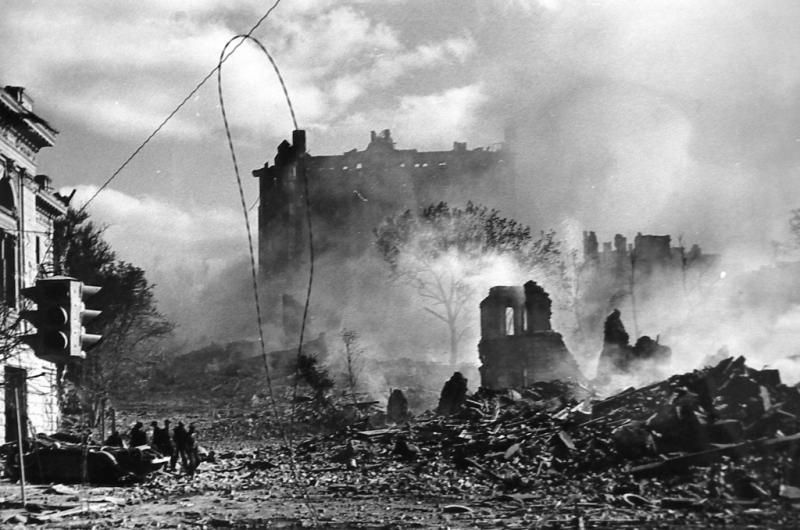
Most of Khreshchatyk had been damaged in 1941, including the former buildings at Khreshchatyk 26

During the Battle of Kiev, as Soviet forces prepared to retreat from Kyiv in 1941, Soviet security services, acting under orders from Moscow, undertook a systematic demolition plan targeting key structures in the city center. Explosives were covertly planted in prominent buildings along Khreshchatyk. The intent was to destroy strategic locations that German troops might occupy. Basements were filled with explosives, while attics were stocked with bottles of flammable liquid—an improvised incendiary often referred to as Molotov cocktails. When German forces entered Kyiv, the city center was already rigged with explosives.

Upon regaining control of the city after the Second Battle of Kiev, Soviet authorities conducted a structural assessment of the war-damaged buildings. Soviet authorities assessed more than 300 destroyed buildings in Kyiv's city center. Experts concluded that approximately 200 of those could be salvaged and restored. Reconstruction efforts began almost immediately, with Khreshchatyk identified as a priority, using captured German POWs as labor.

After the debris was cleared from Khreshchatyk, it was discovered that parts of a central building’s structure had survived. These remnants belonged to the former telegraph and telephone station located at 26 Khreshchatyk. As a result, the site was selected for the construction of the Kyiv Television and Radio Center, which would later become home to Ukrainian Radio.

=== Construction of the new premises at Khreshchatyk 26 ===
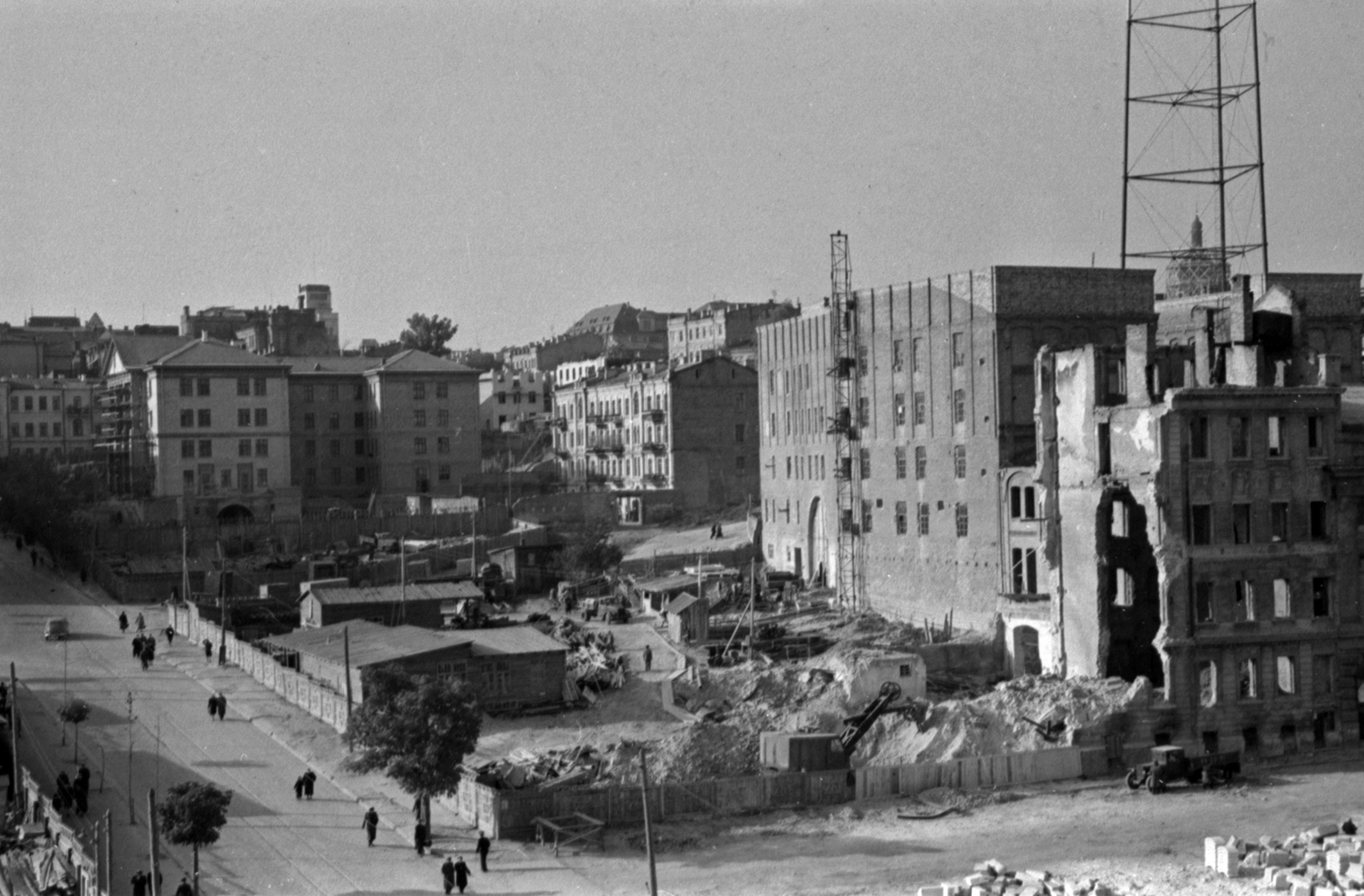
Construction of the new TV and radio center. 1949.

The construction of the Kyiv Television and Radio Center officially began in 1949, following a directive from the Council of Ministers of the Ukrainian SSR and the Central Committee of the Communist Party of Ukraine, dated December 15, 1948. This was formalized by Resolution No. 695 of the Kyiv City Executive Committee on April 18, 1949, which authorized the creation of a facility designed to support both studio and non-studio television programming. The center marked a major step in the development of Ukraine's broadcasting infrastructure in the postwar period.

The selection of the site for the center was made under the leadership of Nikita Khrushchev, who at the time was the party and economic head of Ukraine. He played a decisive role in securing the project’s approval and funding. In response to the growing presence of television in Moscow and Leningrad, Khrushchev reportedly questioned why Ukraine should lag behind, prompting Joseph Stalin to authorize a significant allocation of 43 million rubles for the project—a substantial sum at the time.

Construction of the Kyiv Television Center began in 1949 and progressed at an accelerated pace. The first brick was laid by German prisoners of war, who were later replaced by workers from the Khreshchatykbud trust. During the construction, daily progress reports were delivered by the site managers to both the Central Committee of the Communist Party and the Council of Ministers.

The selected construction site proved challenging. Located in the center of Kyiv, it stood on a steep slope amid the ruins of pre-revolutionary buildings. Establishing stable foundations required excavation to depths of up to twenty meters, much of it carried out manually, due to the limited availability of modern construction equipment at the time.

The reconstruction was overseen by architect Viktor Yelizarov, who played a major role in shaping postwar Kyiv's urban image. In addition to this project, Elizarov directed the redevelopment of several prominent city landmarks, including Bohdan Khmelnytsky Square and Taras Shevchenko Boulevard. Elizarov was also responsible for other major Soviet-era infrastructure, such as Mother Ukraine, Khreshchatyk metro station, and Zhulyany Airport. The architectural tendency of this era had relied heavily on reinforced concrete, a material that was often left exposed and viewed as lacking aesthetic appeal. The broader vision for the postwar reconstruction of Khreshchatyk was designed to offset this with the use of stone cladding, a more monumental and decorative appearance. The architectural style here uses Venetian design motifs, as opposed to the more austere Soviet architecture of its era.

In designing the Television and Radio Center, Elizarov sought to harmonize it with the surrounding architectural ensemble. The building’s limestone decoration was inspired by what he had observed abroad, influenced by Venetian architecture with its imperial overtones. Venice, while a republic, historically projected its power through grand architectural statements across the Mediterranean. The historian Roman Malenkov said:

"They built so much beautiful things all over the Mediterranean that, perhaps, Elizarov wanted, without going into any special fantasies, to take everything ready-made and beautiful - and do something similar. Our Ukrainian baroque is incredible. Ukrainian modern. If they presented it to us the way it should be, it would look "no worse than buildings by Antonio Gaudi."

=== Novel approaches to technology ===
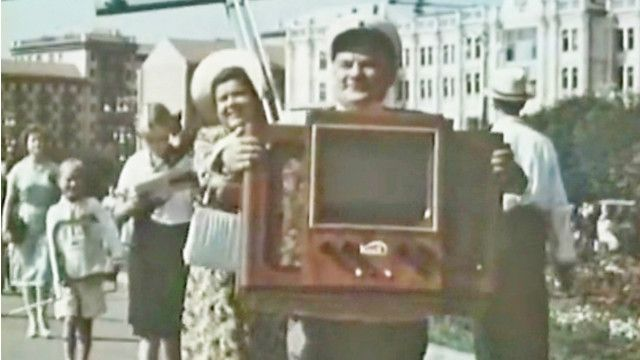
Kyiv resident carries a newly obtained KVN-49 TV with a huge antenna next to Khreshchatyk 26.

In the early postwar period, only three television studios existed in the Soviet Union: Moscow, Leningrad, and the newly established center in Kyiv. At the time of their formation, Soviet television centers operated as independent, self-contained units—isolated "islands" in the vast expanse of the television landscape. Each center managed its own programming and broadcasts within its respective region. There were no cable or relay networks to connect them, nor were there satellite links or systems for sharing content across distances. Even basic methods of interstudio exchange were lacking, as video recording technology had not yet been introduced.

Initially, television infrastructure in Moscow and Leningrad relied heavily on American-made equipment. But as Cold War tensions escalated, the U.S. government imposed restrictions on the export of precision instruments and broadcasting technology to the USSR. Unlike Moscow’s Shabolovka Telecenter, which had been outfitted using American equipment from RCA as part of wartime agreements, Kyiv’s facility relied entirely on domestically produced Soviet equipment.

Soviet authorities turned to experts in postwar East Germany for technical expertise. The former German model became the foundation for the construction and outfitting of the Kyiv Television Center. Germany had developed robust television capabilities prior to World War II; for instance, during the 1936 Berlin Olympics, German broadcasters transmitted coverage using a mobile television station, which was an innovation that was unmatched at the time. As a result, German technologies were adapted for Soviet use, often with the participation of German specialists working under contract. Some of these contributions were officially recognized through Soviet state prizes, although awarded discreetly through classified decrees.

Ukrainian engineers had to devise indigenous solutions. This led the center to become a pioneer in television engineering not only within the Soviet Union but also across Europe. Among its innovations was the implementation of a 625-line image resolution system, a standard originally developed in the USSR during World War II and later adopted by numerous European and international broadcasters.

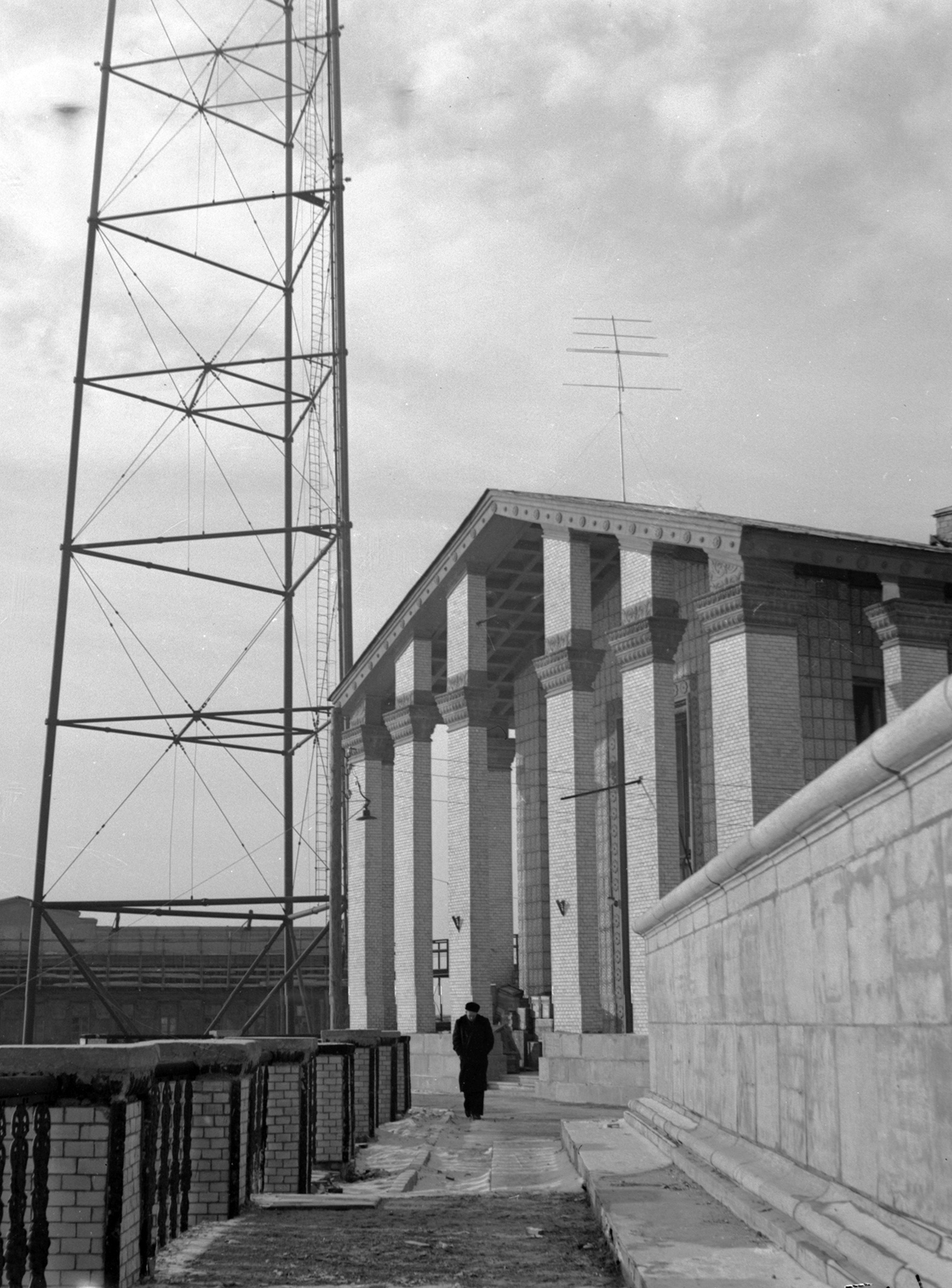
View of the building and tower of the original Kyiv TV tower in Kyiv. The radio tower was dismantled in 1973, and was eventually replaced by the Kyiv TV Tower.

The TV Center was equipped with two primary studios:

- Studio B, a smaller studio measuring 150 square meters, completed in 1951
- Studio A, a larger pavilion of 270 square meters, completed in mid-1952

Behind the Television Center, on what was then Malopidvalna Street, a television transmission tower was erected, reaching a height of 192 meters. At the time, the structure was considered a classified strategic object, which is why it is rarely visible in contemporary panoramic photographs of Khreshchatyk. It provided a reliable signal within 60–70 km, although determined viewers constructed their own high antennas and were reportedly able to receive Kyiv broadcasts as far away as Zhytomyr (about 130 km).

Every step of the creation of the Kyiv television studio required innovation, experimentation, and training. Among the earliest figures to shape Ukrainian television were Mykhailo Kaznevsky, the first chief director of the Kyiv studio; Mykola Pashchyn, the studio’s founding director; and Yurii Fedorov, one of Ukraine’s first television lighting designers.

== The original Kiev TV Center ==
=== Birth of Ukrainian television ===
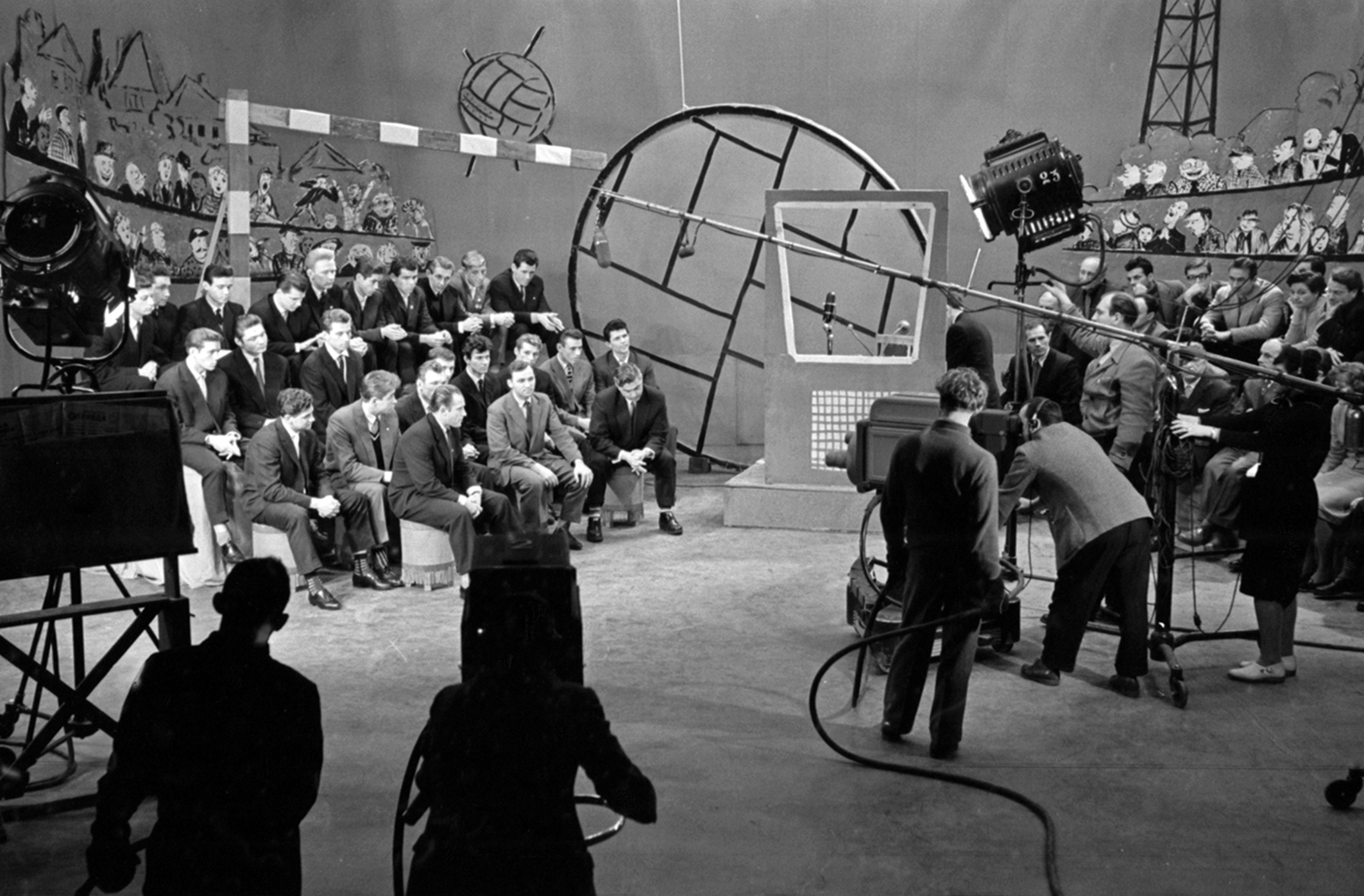
An early television program is recorded at the studio of the Kyiv TV Center.

The official revival of postwar television broadcasting in Kyiv is generally dated to November 6, 1951. On that day, the first feature-length program was aired in Ukraine: the Soviet film The Great Dawn, directed by Mikhail Chiaureli in 1938. The film was selected to align with celebrations for the 34th anniversary of the October Revolution. The film that focused on Lenin and Stalin was a deliberate choice based in the political climate of the time and the ideological tone expected in pre-revolution anniversary programming. The launch marked Kyiv as the third city in the USSR, after Moscow and Leningrad, to begin regular television broadcasts, and the first television studio in a Soviet Union republic outside the Russian SFSR.

Despite the lack of fully equipped studios or formally approved staff, a significant live broadcast took place on November 7, 1951. This broadcast featured coverage of a military parade and a workers’ demonstration in honor of the Revolution anniversary. The event was transmitted using improvised methods, as no mobile television station (PTS) yet existed in Kyiv (the first PTS would only arrive in May 1954). The temporary solution involved rolling two television cameras directly out of the studio onto Khreshchatyk Street, just outside the Kyiv TV center at Khreshchatyk 26, which then had an unobstructed view of the main thoroughfare.

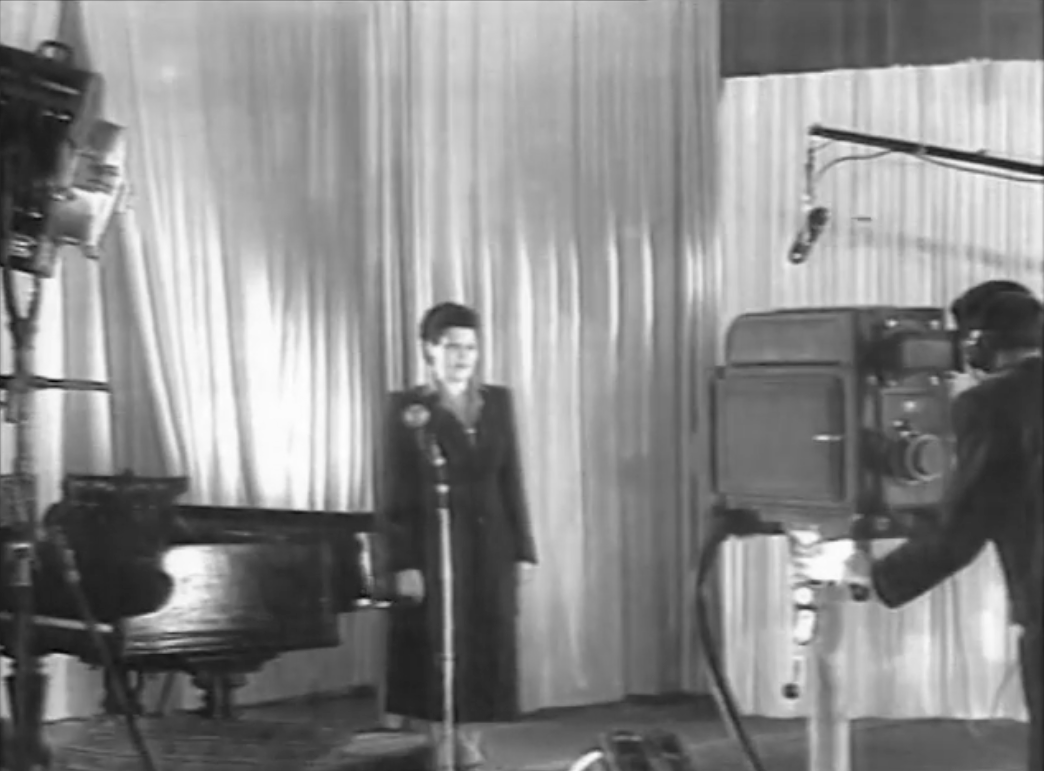
Olga Danylenko performs the first television news broadcast from Kyiv Television and Radio Center in 1952.

The Kyiv TV center at the time operated from a four-story building clad in white limestone, located at Khreshchatyk 26. Because this building sat back from the street and had no structures blocking its view (such as the future Ministry of Agriculture or the “Mystetstvo” art store), technicians were able to stage an extra-studio outdoor broadcast. The broadcast itself lacked full production support — no director operated the control panel, and no commentators or technical staff actively operated the equipment during the event — making it more of a technical demonstration than a formal production. However, it remains recognized as Kyiv’s first remote television broadcast.

By November 1951, there were 662 registered television sets in Kyiv, primarily models such as the KVN-49, which used a magnifying lens with distilled water, and the Leningrad T-2. The first radio and television service workshop in Kyiv opened at 32 Yaroslavska Street, where owners were required to register their TV sets. Registration was mandatory due to a monthly fee of 10 rubles imposed on TV subscribers, a policy that remained in place until the monetary reform of 1961, when subscription fees were abolished. The name of the first registered TV owner in Kyiv was the retired Colonel S. Fedorovsky.

On May 1, 1952, Kyiv television aired its first major concert, transmitted from the Studio B of the Kyiv TV Center. The program featured prominent soloists from the Taras Shevchenko Kyiv Opera House, including Eleonora Tomm, Nina Kostenko, Yulia Churyukina, and Mykola Yevsyuk, as well as popular Leningrad variety performers Arthur Shurov and Ricunin. The event was presented by Novella Serpiyonova, recognized as the first announcer of Ukrainian television.

In mid-1952, the second hardware and studio unit, known as Studio A, was put into operation at the Kyiv TV Center. This remained the largest studio at the Khreshchatyk 26 complex for the next four decades. At that time, more than 2,000 television sets were already registered in Kyiv and surrounding areas, and even some villages had access to television.

Television in Kyiv was under close government supervision. A resolution by the Council of Ministers of the Ukrainian SSR on October 31, 1952, outlined plans to complete the Kyiv TV Center and set directions for the creation of programming. Consequently, by November 1952, the first stage of the center entered full-time operation, and regular television broadcasts officially began.

At the beginning, television broadcasts were limited to two days a week, primarily featuring concerts, documentaries, and feature films. The launch of television thus required not only announcers and journalists, but also technical staff from Ukrainian Radio, such as sound engineers, transmission specialists, and lighting technicians.

=== The first television personalities ===
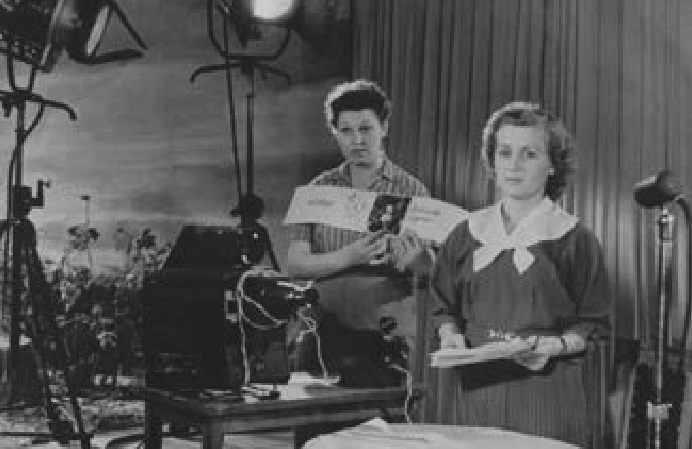
Olga Danylenko (left) and Olena Nikolaeva (right) are widely thought to be the first faces of Ukrainian television.

The first three television presenters on Ukrainian television were: in 1952, Novela Serpionova and Olga Danylenko, and in 1953, Olena Nikolaeva. These broadcasts were largely viewed on KVN-49's, where by 1951, there were 661 in the city of Kyiv.

Working as a television announcer was considered one of the most prestigious jobs of the time — but the selection process was extremely competitive. In addition to strong speaking skills, appearance played a decisive role. At that time, teleprompters didn’t exist, so announcers were required to memorize large amounts of text.

Visual presentation became part of the job, and the first stage of selection for television often involved evaluating candidates based on photographs, even before assessing vocal or language skills. According to Tetyana Tsymbal, who later worked at Suspilne and joined in the late 1960s, she recalled seeing portrait photographs of Danilenko and Nikolaieva displayed in the dressing room. They were admired as icons, "heavenly figures," she said, and were beloved by viewers. The studio regularly received bags of fan letters filled with admiration and affection.

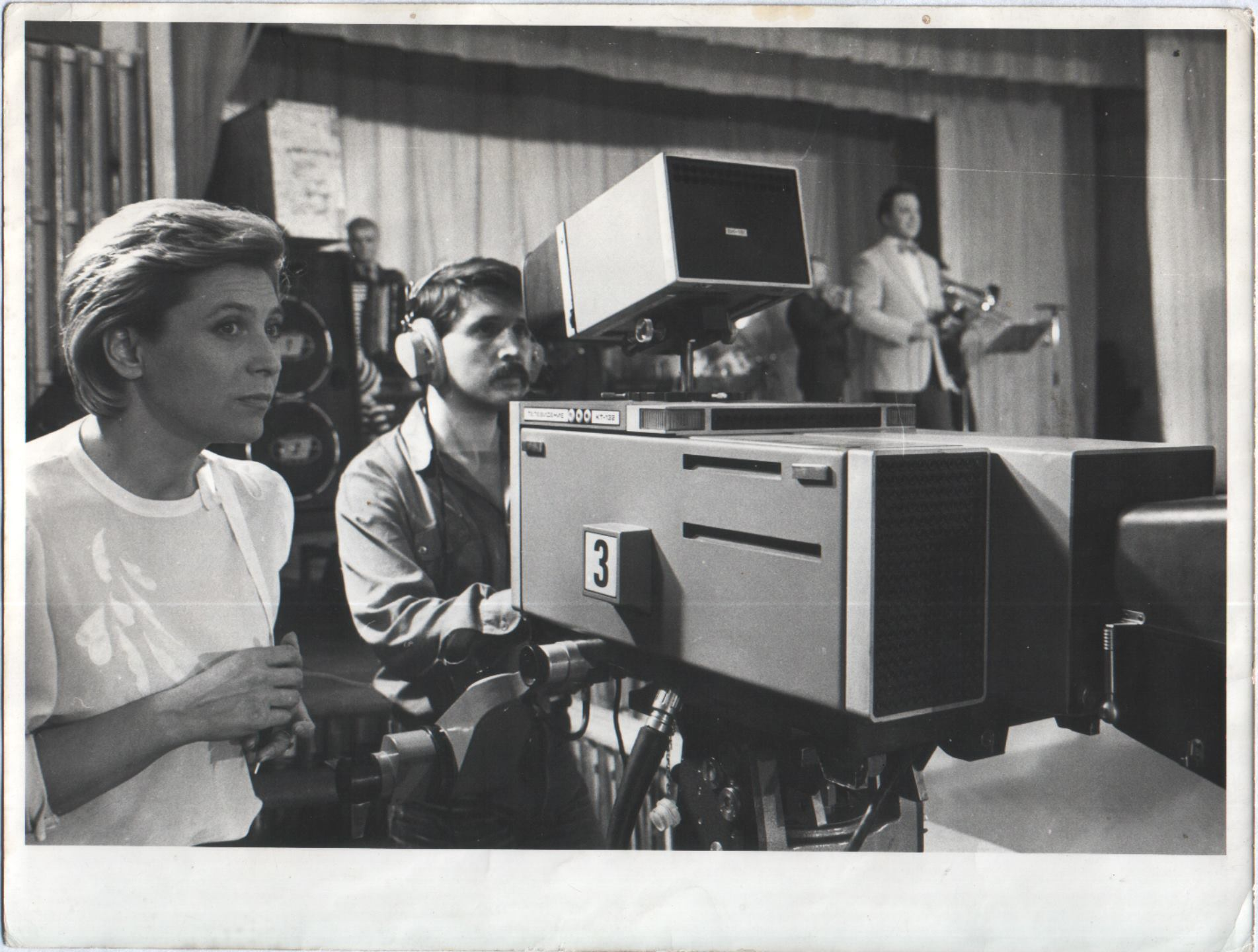
Tatiana Tsymbal (left) was a pioneering figure in Ukrainian television, arriving at the Center in 1968 and studying radio craft under Olga Danylenko

But in the early days of television, a woman’s visual appeal could matter more than her command of language, which was a sharp contrast to radio, where voice and diction were everything. On the radio, performers didn't need to buy new suits, wear makeup, dye their hair, or memorize full blocks of their scripts. Many of the first television professionals came from radio and had to adjust to being in front of a camera, but not everyone did. Novella Serapionova, even though she was the first television presenter in the history of Ukraine, eventually returned to radio, preferring the voice-focused medium where appearance was not scrutinized as harshly. She was largely forgotten by history until the 60th anniversary of Ukrainian television.

Television in Ukraine was broadcast live until 1960, when pre-broadcast recording technology was introduced.

== 1996 fire ==
On March 9, 1996, the birthday of national poet Taras Shevchenko and the day after International Women's Day, a significant fire broke out at the House of Radio. The blaze began during the night, originating on the second floor in the central radio broadcasting equipment area. Despite the fact that radio services were being transmitted continuously and a police post was stationed at the main entrance, the alert was not raised by internal staff. Instead, the first emergency call came from a resident of a nearby building. According to the duty log of the Kyiv fire brigade, the report was made at 3:35 a.m. by an individual identified by only by the surname Bezstanko. No further details about the caller were recorded. Given the strategic importance of the facility, it prompted an immediate large-scale response. Ten fire engines were dispatched with sirens activated, and emergency crews worked to bring the visible flames under control.

It soon became clear to the firefighters that several radio staff members were still inside the building, trapped on the second floor where the fire had broken out. The flames had cut off access to the central stairwell, making it impossible for them to escape on their own. A team of eleven firefighters rushed to attempt a rescue rescue. The radio staff, working the night shift, were safely evacuated through a window, unharmed, but visibly shaken.

Mykola Doroshko, the head of Kyiv’s Fire Safety Department, arrived on the scene and classified the incident as a Category Three fire: an especially dangerous level. He immediately called for reinforcements. Soon, 29 additional fire trucks were dispatched, and nearly 100 firefighters were battling the blaze. Despite their efforts, the fire could not be contained.

At the time, Oleksandr Savenko, then head of the National Television Company of Ukraine, was out of the city on a business trip related to the Eurovision Song Contest. The first deputy head, Ivan Maschenko, was contacted and arrived within 30 minutes. With the main entrance blocked by fire trucks, he accessed the building through a secondary entrance on Borys Hrinchenko Street. By then, the fire had spread from the second floor, used primarily for radio operations, to the third floor, which housed the main television studios, including that of UT-1 (now known as Suspilne). Eventually, the flames reached the fourth floor, damaging the station’s key technical and control facilities.

In an interview with BBC Ukraine, Maschenko recalled:

"My office was in the far from the scene of the wing. But there was also a pitted smell of smoke and ashes. The lights in the entire building were turned off, the phones were not working. Therefore, I went through the dark corridors and confusing passages to the epicenter. In the central part of the building, firefighters were still waiting with hydrants."

By 6:00 a.m., firefighters had finally brought the blaze under control, but by then, concern had already spread among the public. At 5:30 a.m., the national radio did not begin its usual broadcast with the Ukrainian anthem and the familiar announcement, “This is Kyiv speaking.” The silence unsettled many listeners. Memories of the 1991 Soviet coup attempt, when Swan Lake aired in place of news programs, remained fresh in people’s minds. Anxiety only grew when, by 7:00 a.m., no usual television intros or broadcasts appeared. Even abroad, there was confusion and concern, as Ukraine’s foreign radio service had gone silent.

Radio broadcasts were soon resumed from the House of Recordings on Leonid Pervomaiskyi Street. Television, however, took longer to restore. Eventually, a temporary broadcast was arranged from the newer television center on Melnykova Street, 42. By 10:00 a.m., transmissions from the damaged Khreshchatyk building resumed. The first segment shown was a live news report directly from the partially burned building.

The destruction caused by the fire resulted in a total damage was estimated at more than ten million U.S. dollars.. The television teams lost the central control room entirely, along with Studio A. This facility housed expensive, imported broadcasting technology that was completely destroyed. For Ukrainian Radio, around 50,000 magnetic tapes, many of them irreplaceable, were soaked during the firefighting efforts. These tapes made up half of the station's almost-mythical sound archive, which had been built over five decades. Among the lost materials were priceless recordings featuring iconic announcers, theater legends, and renowned singers and musicians who had visited Kyiv over the years.

Investigators determined that the fire began in the central radio broadcasting unit. It reportedly started inside a closed wooden cabinet where an electric kettle had been placed. The fire spread rapidly—first engulfing the cabinet, then igniting the wooden ceiling, which collapsed onto the radio equipment and set the entire area ablaze.

Fire investigators could not determine a cause, but entertained several hypotheses:

- Negligence may have played a role. It's possible that the staff, having celebrated International Women’s Day on March 8, were careless and left the kettle unattended.
- Another theory pointed to deliberate arson. Motives ranged from attempts to cover up financial misconduct involving imported equipment to political revenge against the station for its editorial stance.
- The date of the fire being the birthday of Taras Shevchenko added to their suspicions.
- Anonymous phone calls warning of bombs in the building had been reported more than once prior to the incident.

== House of Ukrainian Radio ==
=== Radio staff develop and handle the first television technology ===
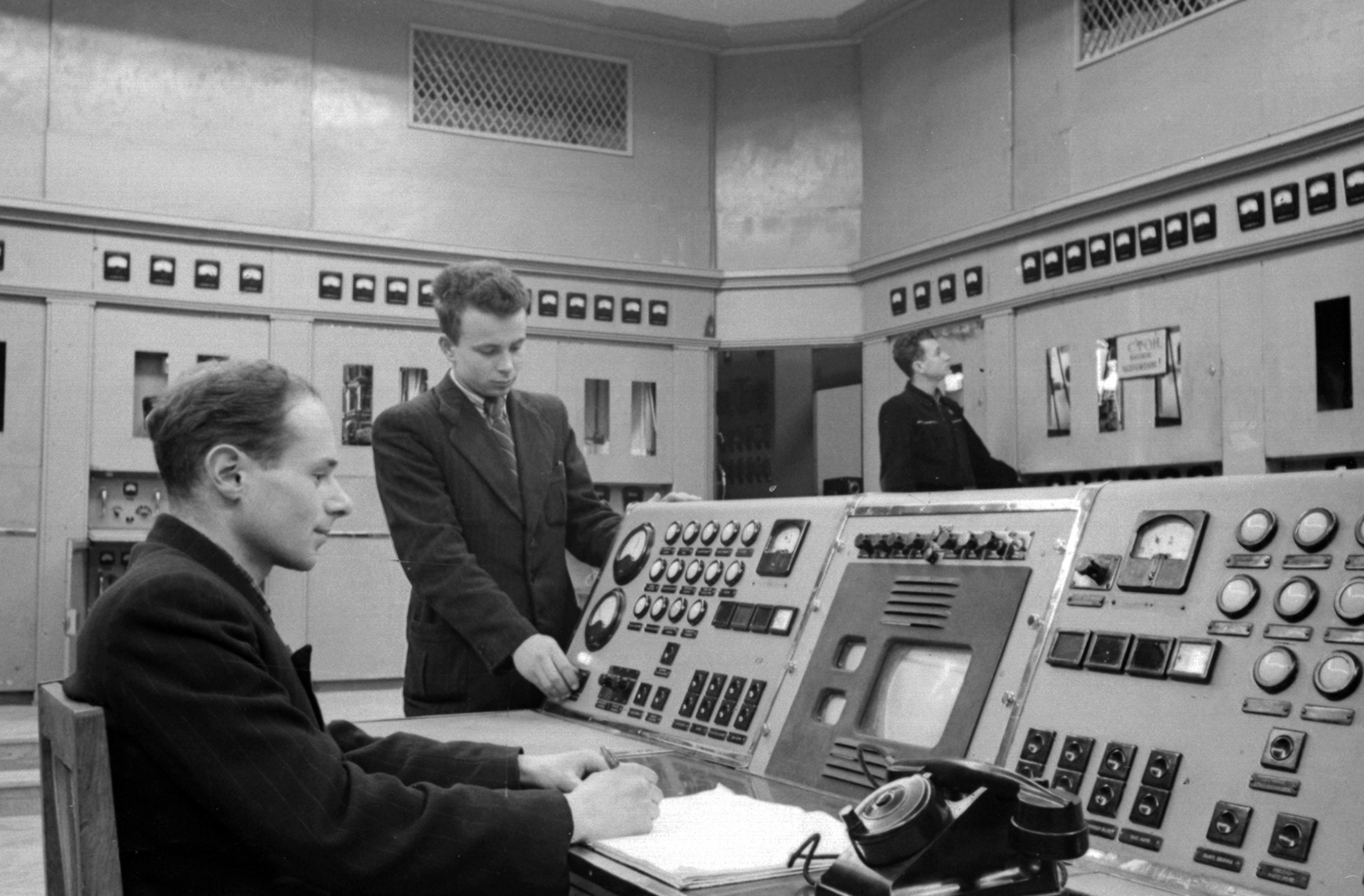
A group of operators near the control panel of the Kiev TV studio.

Ukrainian Radio, housed in the same building, was intricately linked with Ukrainian Television, a collaborative effort taking place within a shared building. As far as mission, there was no distinction between the two departments in the early days. Initially, most people could only listen to television broadcasts, as only a few technically skilled radio amateurs had the equipment capable of receiving the video signal.

Radio specialists played a crucial role in launching Ukrainian television. Since television in Ukraine emerged from the foundation of radio broadcasting, many professions originally associated solely with radio were carried over into the new medium. Some technical operations in early television were handled entirely by radio staff, not only in Kyiv but in other Ukrainian cities as well.

Some of the professions that were once essential in this period have since disappeared entirely, made obsolete by technological advances and the evolution of broadcasting. One of the now-forgotten professions in early television was that of the cable handler. This role was typically filled by technical staff from radio, who were already familiar with managing complex equipment. The cable handler’s job was to manage the heavy, thick television cable connected to the television camera, making sure it didn’t drag noisily across the floor during live movements. Another essential but now obsolete role was the film reel operator, who had to quickly and quietly swap film reels during broadcasts. These positions were often entrusted to radio technicians and engineers, who were accustomed to the pressures of live broadcasting.

At the time, there was little public understanding of what television actually was or how it differed from radio. The concept of television as a distinct medium developed gradually. Radio enthusiasts played a key role in expanding access. Using their technical know-how, they combined antennas and configured their equipment to capture signals from greater distances. As a result, television broadcasts from the Kyiv TV Center could be received not just in the city, but also in places like Zhytomyr and Rivne, up to 300 kilometers away or more.

=== Television moves to a new location, radio stays ===
In 1992, Ukrainian public television moved its headquarters to the Kyiv Television Center, while public radio remained headquartered at Khreshchatyk 26. Eventually, the Ukrainian public started calling this location the "House of Ukrainian Radio," or simply the "House of Radio."

In 2017, the radio station Voice of Kyiv, part of the Kyiv branch of the National Public Broadcasting Company of Ukraine, was relocated from its previous address at Khreshchatyk 6 to the premises of Ukrainian Radio at Khreshchatyk 26. While it functioned as a state-run station, the regional government provided significant rental subsidies, allowing it to occupy 350 square meters of space for just 1 hryvnia per year. However, after January 19, 2017, when the station became part of the public joint-stock company NPBCU, it was required to pay market-based rent, which amounted to approximately 460,000 UAH annually. This instigated the move to Khreshchatyk 26. As of July 1, 2017, Voice of Kyiv also began additional broadcasts on the UR-3 channel in three daily time blocks, totaling four hours of programming each day.

As of 2019, the House of Radio functioned as a fully modernized television and radio broadcasting complex. From this historic building, four national channels of Ukrainian Radio transmitted programming around the clock. In addition to radio, the complex also housed the Kyiv-based television station Central Channel, which was part of the National Public Television and Radio Company of Ukraine.

== Post-2022 full scale invasion ==
At the start of Russia’s full-scale invasion of Ukraine, the Kyiv Television Center (also known as "The Pencil") was among the first facilities to suffer damage. On March 1, 2022, the building was affected by missile strikes targeting the nearby Kyiv TV Tower. Later that year, in November, a decision was made to close The Pencil. As a result, radio and television teams of Suspilne were reunited, returning to work together once again in the building.
