= Khreshchatyk 26 =

Famous street address in Kyiv

- Хрещатик, 26
- Interactive map of the Khreshchatyk 26 area

General information
- Coordinates: 50.448611°N 30.521389°E
- Groundbreaking: 1798
- Completed: 1803
- Destroyed: 1941
- Replaced by the Kyiv Television and Radio Center which began construction in 1949

Khreshchatyk 26 (Ukrainian: Хрещатик, 26) is a prominent location on Khreshchatyk Street in Kyiv. It has even been called "the most famous Ukrainian street address."

In 1849, Khreshchatyk 26 housed Kyiv's central Post Office, and in the centuries that followed, it house the first Kyiv Central Telephone Exchange, the National Bank of Ukraine, and the Kyiv Polytechnic Institute. During World War II, after a series of deliberately placed Ukrainian bombs raised most of the other buildings on Khreshchatyk, the walls of this building were some of the few left standing, but the building had largely been destroyed.

In the latter half of the twentieth century, it was the location of the Kyiv Television and Radio Center, which was first opened in 1951, and was the location of the first regular non-experimental television broadcast in the country of Ukraine. In 1992, public television moved to its new headquarters at the Kyiv Television Center. Khreshchatyk 26 still houses some radio and television stations, but today is known more commonly as the House of Ukrainian Radio.

== History ==
=== The Old Kiev Fortress and the Moscow Garden ===
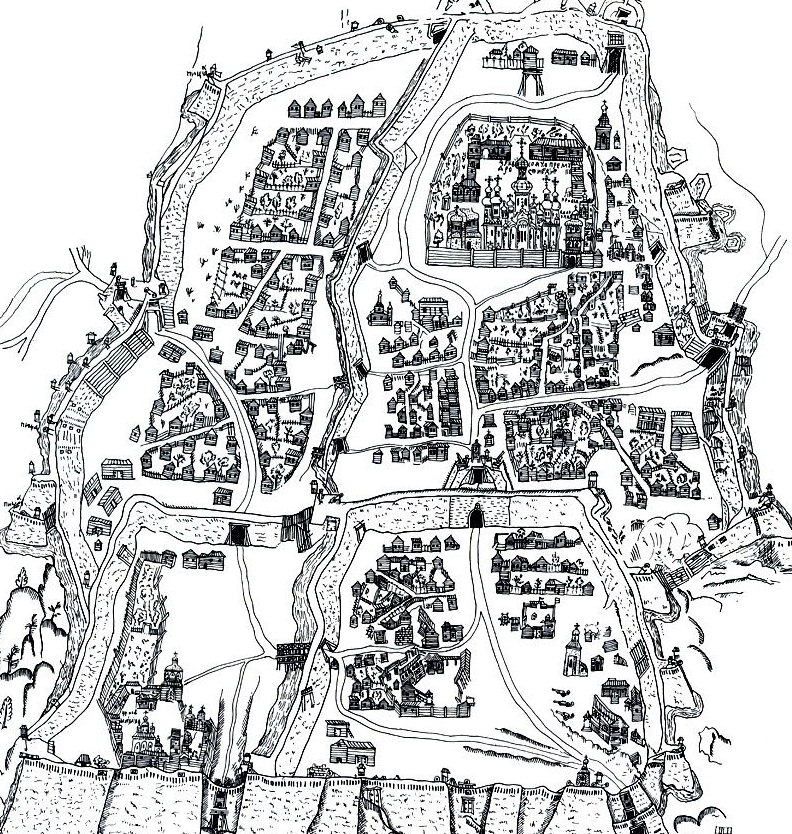
Plans of the Old Kiev Fortress from 1695

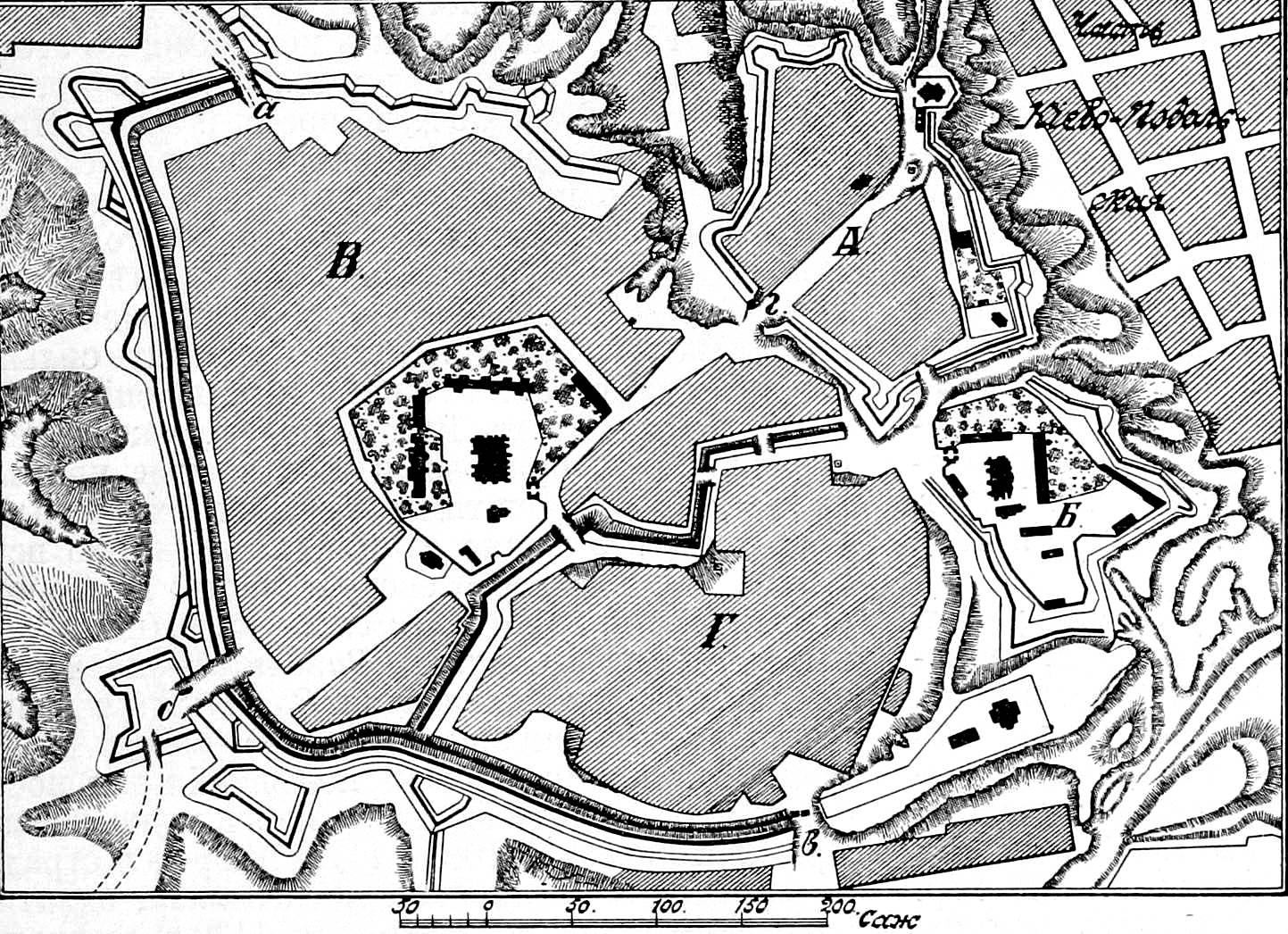
Aerial view of the old fortress from approximately 1706

The Old Kiev Fortress (known in some 17th-century Ukrainian sources as the "Moscow Garden", with the name "Starokyivska" becoming common after 1706) was a defensive complex surrounding the Upper City of "Old Kiev". It existed from 1654 until the late 18th century, constructed shortly after Kyiv's incorporation into the Tsardom of Muscovy. The fortress served as both a military outpost and the administrative seat of the Russian voivodes, with a garrison that varied from approximately 2,500 to 7,000 troops.

Its early design made use of the remnants of ancient Rus’ fortifications, specifically from the cities of Volodymyr and Yaroslava. Initially, the defenses consisted of earthen ramparts topped with wooden parapets and towers. Within the enclosed area were key administrative and military facilities: the Voivode's residence, courts, a postal station, barracks, wells, and storage buildings for arms and supplies.

Beginning in 1672, the fortifications were modernized with the help of Western European military engineers, including Patrick Gordon. Upgrades included reinforcing the ramparts, replacing wooden structures with more permanent earthworks and bastions, and building auxiliary fortifications and internal ramparts, effectively dividing the fortress into four distinct zones.

Following the construction of the Pechersk Fortress in 1706, administrative and military functions gradually shifted away from Old Kiev. Nonetheless, further repairs and enhancements continued into the mid-18th century. Under the direction of Burchard Christoph von Münnich in the 1730s and D. de Bosquet in the 1740s–50s, the fortress saw additional modernization. Notably, two brick gatehouses were built:

- The Golden Gate (1753), near the site of the medieval Kyivan Golden Gate, later dismantled in 1799;
- The Pechersk Gate (ca. 1756), removed in 1833 but symbolically reconstructed in 2001 on Independence Square.

The formal dismantling of the fortress occurred between 1797 and 1799, with the remaining earthen rampartsgradually removed during the 1830s–1870s.

=== Golovinsky Palace ===
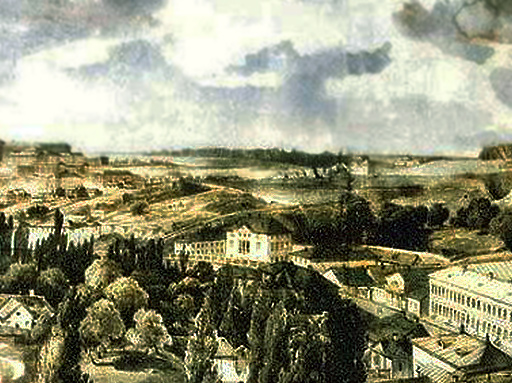
Golovinsky Palace and the surrounding area. (Painting from 1850).

At the beginning of the 19th century, Onufriy Golovynsky established his estate on the site previously occupied by the ramparts of the Old Kiev Fortress. Set back from the street's edge, he constructed a palace in the architectural styles of Classicism and Neo Empire.

Prior to the 1830s, Khreshchatyk wasn't a street, it was a rural area of rolling hills called the Khreshchatyk Valley. The true emergence of Khreshchatyk Street is traditionally dated to 1797, but even then, there was no street here. That year, a contract fair, previously held in the city of Dubno, was relocated to Kyiv and organized for the first time on the site of present-day Khreshchatyk. At the time, the area was largely undeveloped, making it well-suited for large public gatherings. It was at the intersection of Kyiv's three principal historical districts: Old Kyiv, Podil, and Pechersk.

As the city grew and the fairs were later moved closer to Bessarabka, Khreshchatyk began to undergo gradual urban development. The first significant structure erected on the street was the two-story palace belonging to Onufry Golovinsk, built in 1797 in a classical architectural style. Golovinsky Palace was not just the first significant structure, but also the first townhouse built on Khreshchatyk.

In the 1830s, following the approval of a new city plan for Kyiv, the street started being developed. This plan especially encouraged construction in the Khreshchatyk Valley, leading to rapid transformation. In 1837, the city's first theater was constructed based on the design of architect Andrey Melensky, marking a major cultural milestone for the city. That same year, a broader development plan was formulated, further accelerating Khreshchatyk's emergence as Kyiv's principal and most prestigious thoroughfare.

=== Kyiv Post Office ===
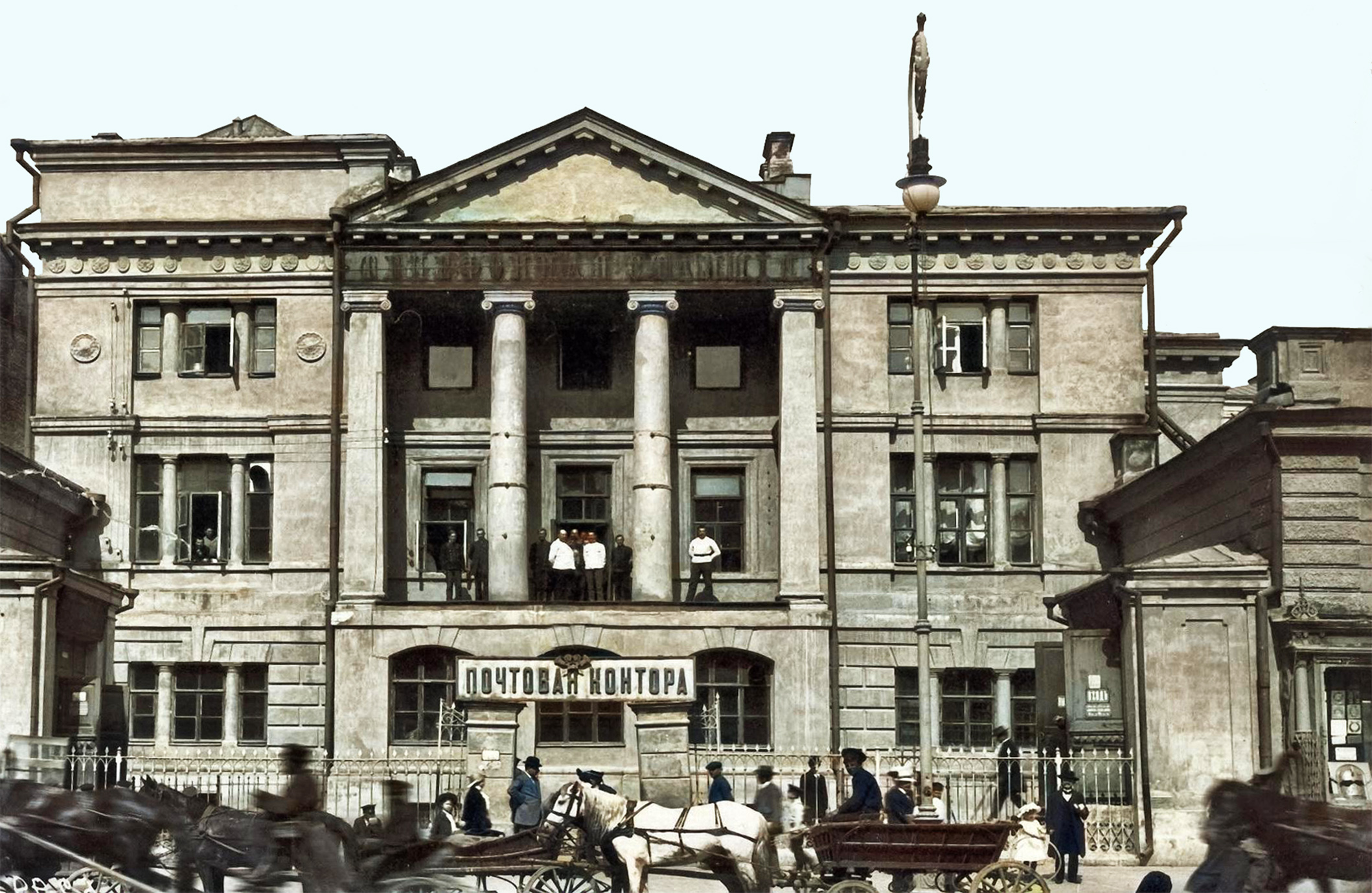
In 1849, the Kyiv Post Office moved into the location at Khreshchatyk 26. (Photograph taken 1890's)

Sometime in the 1840s, the authorities purchased Golovinsky Palace and the surrounding land from Golovinsky.

In 1848, the Kyiv Post Office moved from its former location at the intersection of Andreevskaya Street and Alexandrovskaya street to Khreshchatyk 26. At that time, the building had a height of three floors. The Post Office opened in the former manor house of the palace, with mail carriages stationed in its courtyard.

In 1873, a new wing was attached to the building.

=== Kyiv Telephone Exchange and the dismantling of Golovinsky Palace ===
On April 1, 1886, the first state telephone exchange in Kyiv was launched on the second floor of the building, serving just 60 subscribers at the time.

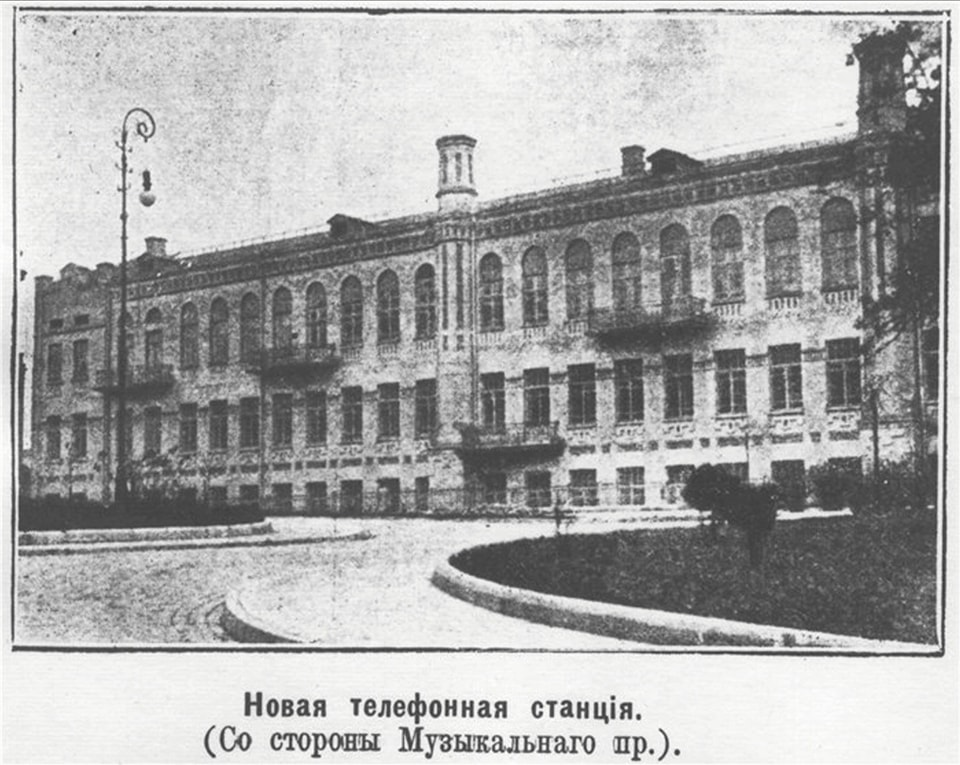
In 1886, the Kyiv Central Telephone Exchange was established at Khreshchatyk 26.

The telephone exchange was staffed exclusively by female operators, who manually connected calls by inserting plugs into a switchboard. These operators were responsible not only for establishing and monitoring connections but also for ensuring sound quality and ending calls at the appropriate time. Upon hiring, they were required to sign a confidentiality agreement, pledging to keep the content of conversations private, as early telephone users in Kyiv were typically influential or prominent individuals.

As demand for postal and telephone services increased, the existing facilities became insufficient.

In 1912, construction of a new building began under the supervision of architect Oleksandr Kobelev. The original Golovynsky Palace was dismantled, and in its place, a four-story building was erected deeper within the courtyard. This new structure housed both operational facilities and an expanded telephone exchange.

=== Soviet Union, World War II, and the mining of Khreshchatyk 26 ===
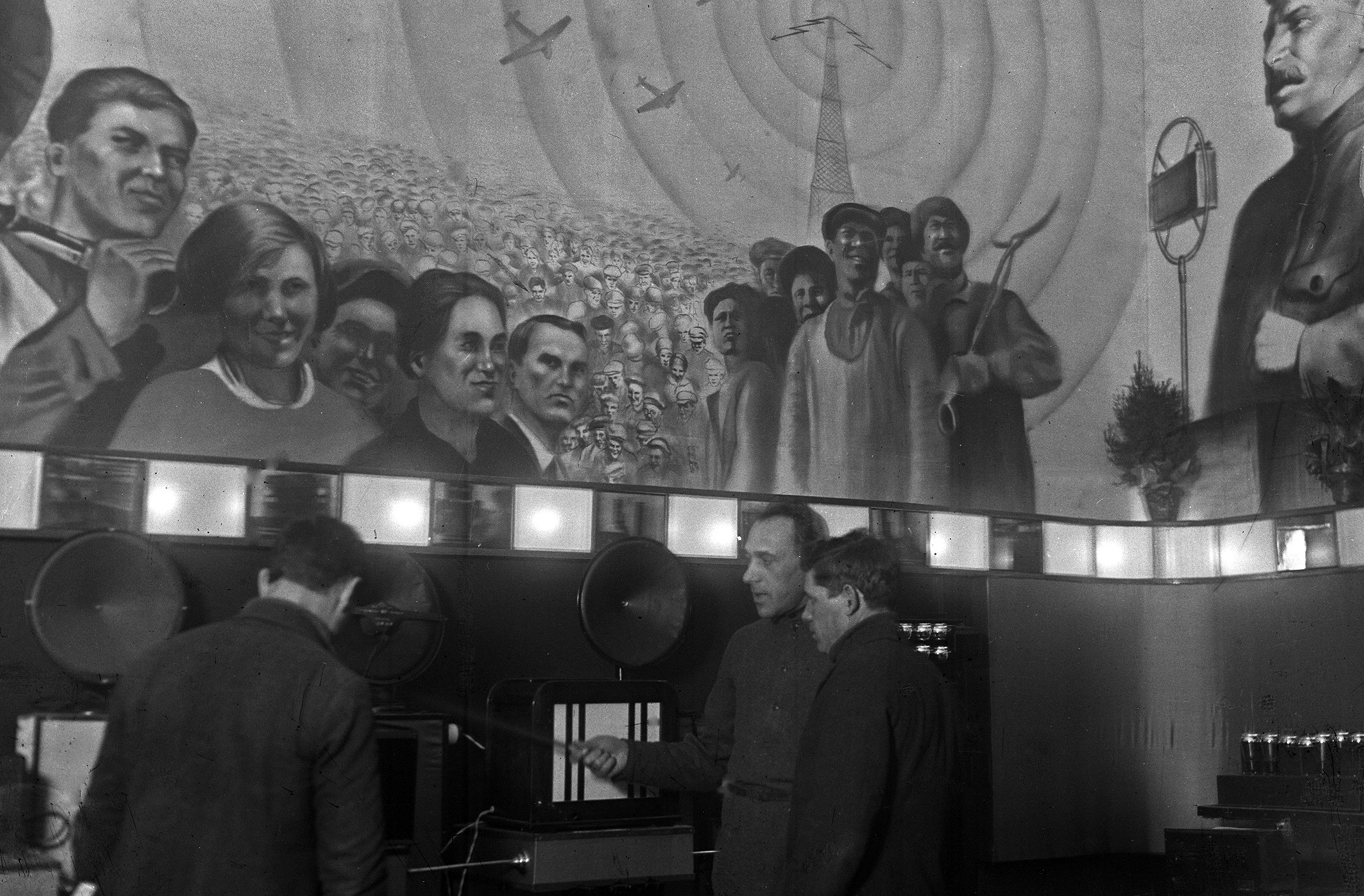
Radio Department of the Soviet Kyiv Communications Department, Palace of Communications, 1935

During the initial years of the Soviet period of Kyiv, following the Russian Revolution, the building that once housed Kyiv's telephone exchange became home to the regional communications department. Known as the Palace of Communications, it remained a central hub for postal and telecommunication services up until the German-Soviet War.

During the Battle of Kiev, as Soviet forces prepared to retreat from Kyiv in 1941, Soviet security services, acting under orders from Moscow, undertook a systematic demolition plan targeting key structures in the city center. Explosives were covertly planted in prominent buildings along Khreshchatyk, Prorizna, Instytutska, Lutheranska, and the surrounding streets. The intent was to destroy strategic locations that German troops might occupy. Basements were filled with explosives, while attics were stocked with bottles of flammable liquid—an improvised incendiary often referred to as Molotov cocktails.

To deflect public suspicion, rumors were deliberately spread suggesting that the NKVD was storing its archives in the basements of these buildings. In reality, these sites were primed for destruction. When German forces entered Kyiv, the city center was already rigged with explosives. Although the Germans were aware of possible sabotage, they underestimated the extent and thoroughness of the Soviet preparations.

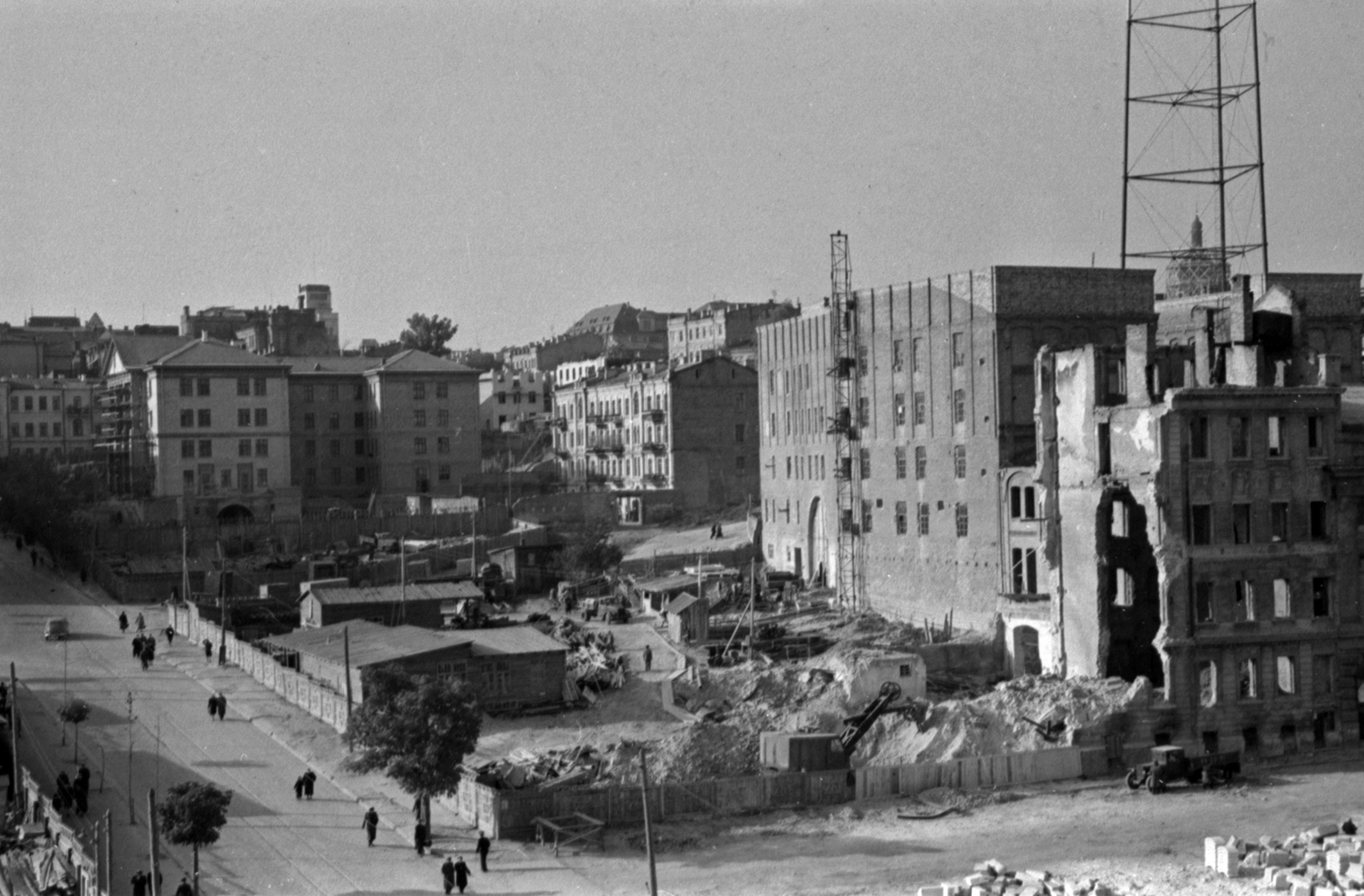
Site of the old palace when reconstruction began in 1949

The fire in central Kyiv, sparked by widespread demolition and sabotage during the German occupation, raged for nearly a week. Much of the historic city center, including Khreshchatyk, was reduced to ruins. Following the destruction, the city fell under German occupation for over two years, and was not regained by Soviet forces until the conclusion of the Second Battle of Kiev on November 6, 1943.

Upon regaining control of the city, Soviet authorities conducted a structural assessment of the war-damaged buildings. Soviet authorities assessed more than 300 destroyed buildings in Kyiv's city center. Experts concluded that approximately 200 of those could be salvaged and restored. Reconstruction efforts began almost immediately, with Khreshchatyk identified as a priority. Reconstruction efforts started with Khreshchatyk and central administrative areas. In 1944, the Soviet government imported over 7,000 captured German soldiers to help rebuild the city, and stationed them primarily at the former Syrets concentration camp.

After the debris was cleared from Khreshchatyk, it was discovered that parts of a central building's structure had survived. These remnants belonged to the former telegraph and telephone stationlocated at 26 Khreshchatyk. As a result, the site was selected for the construction of the Kyiv Television and Radio Center, which would later become home to Ukrainian Radio.

=== Kyiv Television and Radio Center ===
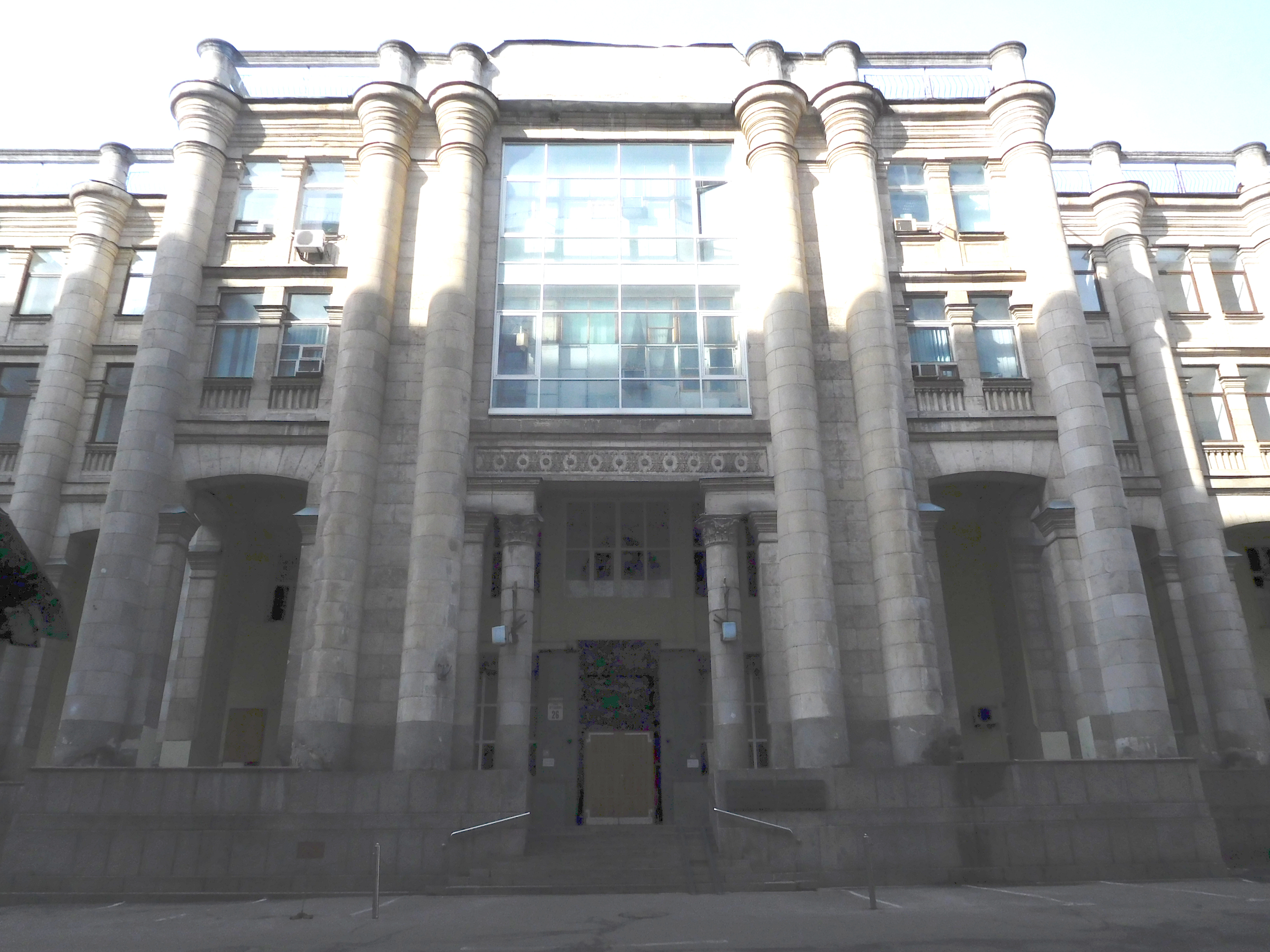
In 1952, the first regular television broadcasts were transmitted from the Kyiv Television and Radio Center

The decision to place the facility at this location was made under the direction of Nikita Khrushchev, then head of the Ukrainian SSR. In the autumn of 1945, he secured funding for the project by convincing Joseph Stalin of its importance. Joseph Stalin authorized 43 million rubles to construct the Kyiv Television and Radio Center here. However, Kyiv had to wait nearly three years before construction could proceed, as priority was given to reestablishing television services in Leningrad.

During reconstruction, the building's facade was redesigned in the Ukrainian Baroque style, in keeping with the broader architectural vision for postwar Khreshchatyk. Yet in the final redevelopment plan, the Television and Radio Center was visually obscured from the main street by a row of newly constructed ministry buildings, effectively hiding it from the view of passers-by.

In 1949, the structure underwent a major reconstruction led by architect Viktor Yelizarov. The updated design preserved the building's original spatial rhythm while incorporating a new facade in the Ukrainian Baroque style and adding risalits on both sides of the primary entrance.

In 1951, the TV and Radio center was completed, and the first regular television broadcasts followed in 1952.
