= Kyiv Television Center =

Building in Kyiv, Ukraine

- Київський телецентр
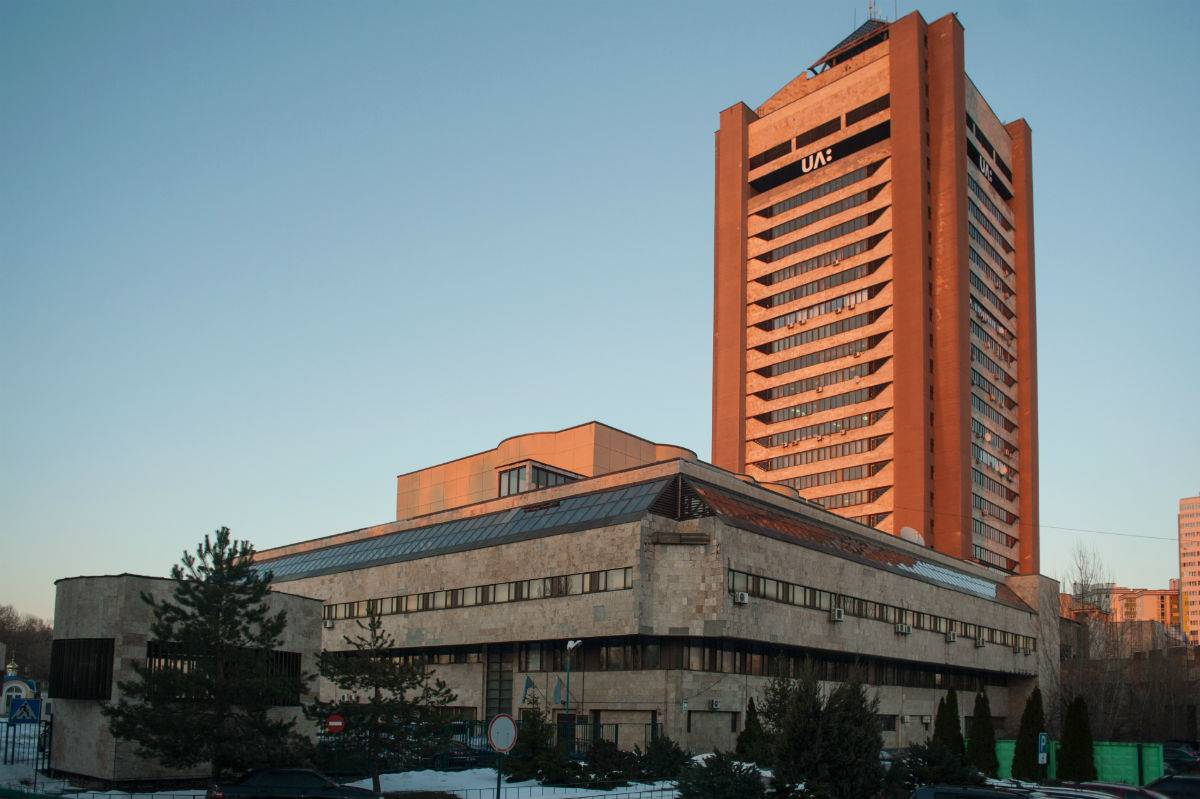
- Interactive map of the Kyiv Television Center area
- Alternative names: "The Pencil" (Олівець)

General information
- Architectural style: Ретроспективізм
- Location: 42 Yuri Illienko Street (formerly Melnikova Street), Kyiv
- Coordinates: 50.473333°N 30.459444°E
- Groundbreaking: 1983
- Opened: December 30, 1992
- Owner: National Public Broadcasting Company of Ukraine

Height
- Height: 105 meters

Technical details
- Floor count: 24

Design and construction
- Architects: Alexander Komarovsky, E. A. Safronov, A. P. Zibin, B. N. Gabriel, Yu. B. Melnychuk
- Civil engineer: M. N. Panich, M. O. Markovskaya

The Kyiv Television Center, or The Pencil, is a modernist skyscraper in Kyiv, and the current symbolic headquarters of Ukrainian public television broadcasting (it has been empty since the invasion). The inception for the building occurred sometime in the 1960s, but its construction was delayed until 1983. It was built on the site of an old Jewish cemetery, which was removed in the 1970s.

For many years, this building was one of the 6 tallest buildings in Kyiv. Shortly after the Dissolution of the Soviet Union, and the 1991 Ukrainian independence referendum, Ukrainian public television moved from its former headquarters, the Kyiv Television and Radio Center, into this building in 1992. Because the building is exceptionally difficult to heat during the winter, an urban legend sprouted that the building was designed by Cubans with Russian surnames, who grew up without having to consider the cold. This building, with its pyramid at the top, inspired several pyramid-domed buildings throughout Kyiv in the 90's. In the late 1990s, the center received a $13.5 million investment to upgrade its electronic equipment. As of 2008, it supported three television channels: 1+1, UT‑1, and TRK Era. The building serves as the headquarters of the National Television Company of Ukraine and accommodates several broadcasting channels. For more than two decades, the facility operated as a restricted-access site. This changed in 2018, when a public New Year's celebration was held on the premises, a shift toward greater openness. However, with the onset of the Russian invasion of Ukraine, the building was completely emptied of staff.

== History ==
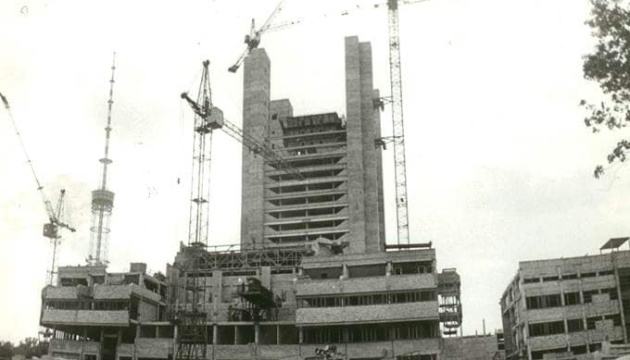
The Kyiv Television Center began construction in 1983, before the USSR dissolved, and finished in 1992, the year after Ukrainian independence.

In 1973, a new location for Kyiv's television center was selected in the Syrets district, directly across the street from the Kyiv television tower. However, as was common with large infrastructure projects in the Soviet Union, construction faced repeated delays and was ultimately completed nearly two decades later. The first television production teams moved into the building in 1993.

The Pencil was originally designed as a backup Soviet television broadcasting center, intended to maintain operations if the main facility in Moscow became inoperable, serving as the USSR's primary reserve television center. The construction of the new television center was originally conceived in the 1960s, but actual building only began in 1983. The initial phase was completed on December 30, 1992. While the original plan had placed the facility near the Zoryanyi cinema, changing urban development redirected the project to a 15-hectare lot adjacent to the regional hospital, land that included a former Jewish cemetery.

The site chosen for the complex had previously been occupied by the Lukyaniv Jewish Cemetery, which remained in place until the 1970s. Today, only a few traces of the cemetery survive, including the former cemetery office at 44 Melnykova Street and several preserved gravestones. The central walkway leading to the television center once served as the main alley of the cemetery. Over the years, the building has become the subject of various local legends, particularly regarding alleged paranormal activity in its corridors. However, such claims remain unverified and are generally regarded as folklore rather than fact.

=== Dissolution of the Soviet Union ===
Between 1991 and 1993, Ukraine began developing its first legislative framework for television and radio broadcasting. In December 1992, the draft law underwent its first reading in parliament, and by the following year, it was officially adopted. Among its most notable provisions was the creation of a national regulatory body: the National Council of Ukraine on Television and Radio Broadcasting. This body, expected to be formed in 1994, was tasked with issuing licenses to both existing and emerging broadcasters.

A key provision of the law involved anti-monopoly restrictions, stipulating that a single company could not hold more than two terrestrial television channels and three radio channels. This clause effectively placed the Ukrainian Television and Radio Broadcasting Company in a legally ambiguous position, as the entity operated two national, 27 regional, and three local channels. Parliamentary records indicate that the restriction was deliberately introduced out of concern that the Ukrainian Television and Radio Broadcasting Company could be used for political purposes, a concern stemming from its role in the political events of 1991.

Additionally, the complex relationship between regional broadcasting studios and the transmission infrastructure, namely the towers and relay centers administered by the Concern of Radio Broadcasting, Radio Communications, and Television, presented further challenges. This infrastructure, inherited from the Soviet Union, was critical for ensuring terrestrial broadcasts. At the time, there was a growing consensus that regional broadcasters should be separated and developed independently within a future public broadcasting framework.

The political landscape shifted again in July 1994 with the election of Ukraine's second president, Leonid Kuchma. His administration became associated with increased stagnation, rising corruption, and heightened media censorship. Notably, in January 1993, prior to Kuchma's presidency, during his tenure as prime minister, the Cabinet of Ministers had attempted to dissolve the Ukrainian Television and Radio Broadcasting Company and transfer its assets to the Ministry of Culture. This decision was later reversed.

In 1993, the broadcasting company underwent a change in leadership due to internal disagreements. One month after taking office as president, Kuchma dismissed Mykola Okhmakevych from the position of chairman of the Ukrainian Television and Radio Broadcasting Company. He subsequently appointed Oleksandr Savenko as chairman, who would go on to be reappointed to the position on two more occasions.

Under the brief period this building was used by Soviet government, the television center formerly maintained its own library, with an official inventory of books. However, after the Euromaidan, a review of its holdings was undertaken, it was determined that only a small number, approximately ten volumes, were suitable for public display. The remainder largely consisted of literature reflecting Soviet-era ideological narratives or works by post-Soviet political figures such as Leonid Kuchma and Serhiy Kivalov. As a result, staff members took the initiative to replenish the collection with more relevant and diverse materials, effectively creating a new internal library.

In the early 2010s, the central hall of the complex, once symbolic of state media power, had become disused and misappropriated. Alcohol was reportedly sold and consumed openly in the main lobby, which had come to resemble an informal marketplace. Parts of the building were also used as a dormitory, with tenants treating the premises as temporary or disposable, leading to its further deterioration. Efforts to remove unauthorized occupants sometimes led to physical confrontations.

=== Euromaidan ===
In 2013, law enforcement officers and personnel from the Berkut special forces surrounded the Kyiv Television Center. Three police vehicles and a bus, along with two buses and a minivan carrying Berkut officers, were observed on the premises. The security personnel were seen moving around the building in bulletproof vests, giving the impression that they had arrived suddenly, possibly in response to an emergency. The operation began around 8:00 p.m. The presence of security forces was related to preparations for a planned televised event—a national telethon scheduled for the following day. Broadcasting teams had already been summoned in connection with the event. The police also heightened security at the facility's entrance, with identity checks being conducted even for familiar staff members. The Interior Minister later said: "Due to the fact that the protesters voiced their intentions to block the TV center, the building was taken under heavy protection by police officers."

By the time the management team led by Zurab Alasania took over operations, just after the Euromaidan, the building had reached its lowest occupancy in history. This was partly due to deliberate evictions and partly the result of staffing reductions across Ukrainian public broadcasting. Many production teams and resources remained scattered across the city, and had not yet been relocated to the complex.

=== New period of openness ===
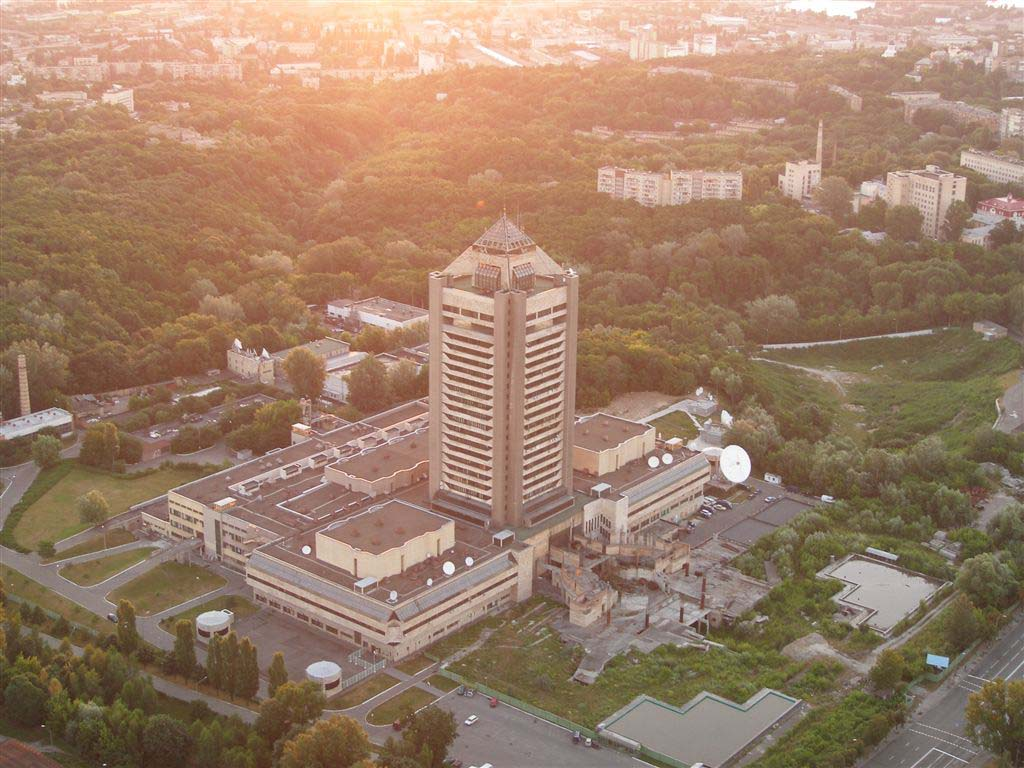
Aerial view of The Pencil.

The building was officially renamed "Pencil" in 2017 as part of a broader rebranding initiative by the National Television Company of Ukraine (NTKU), later known as Suspilne. The initiative aimed to reposition the structure as a recognizable and inviting public media space. There were discussions of repainting the facade in vibrant colors to enhance its visibility and symbolic presence in Kyiv's urban landscape.

Despite the changes, the television center's technical infrastructure was outdated. At the time, only six HD-capable cameras were in operation, and much of the equipment was considered inferior to even older-generation consumer smartphones. Plans were underway to modernize the facility and improve working conditions, including raising staff salaries and investing in new technology. Plans were also made to repurpose parts of the facility for more community-oriented functions. One of the cloakroom areas in the main hall was designated for conversion into a children's play space, recognizing that many employees often brought their children to work due to the demanding nature of broadcast production, which frequently requires weekend or irregular hours.

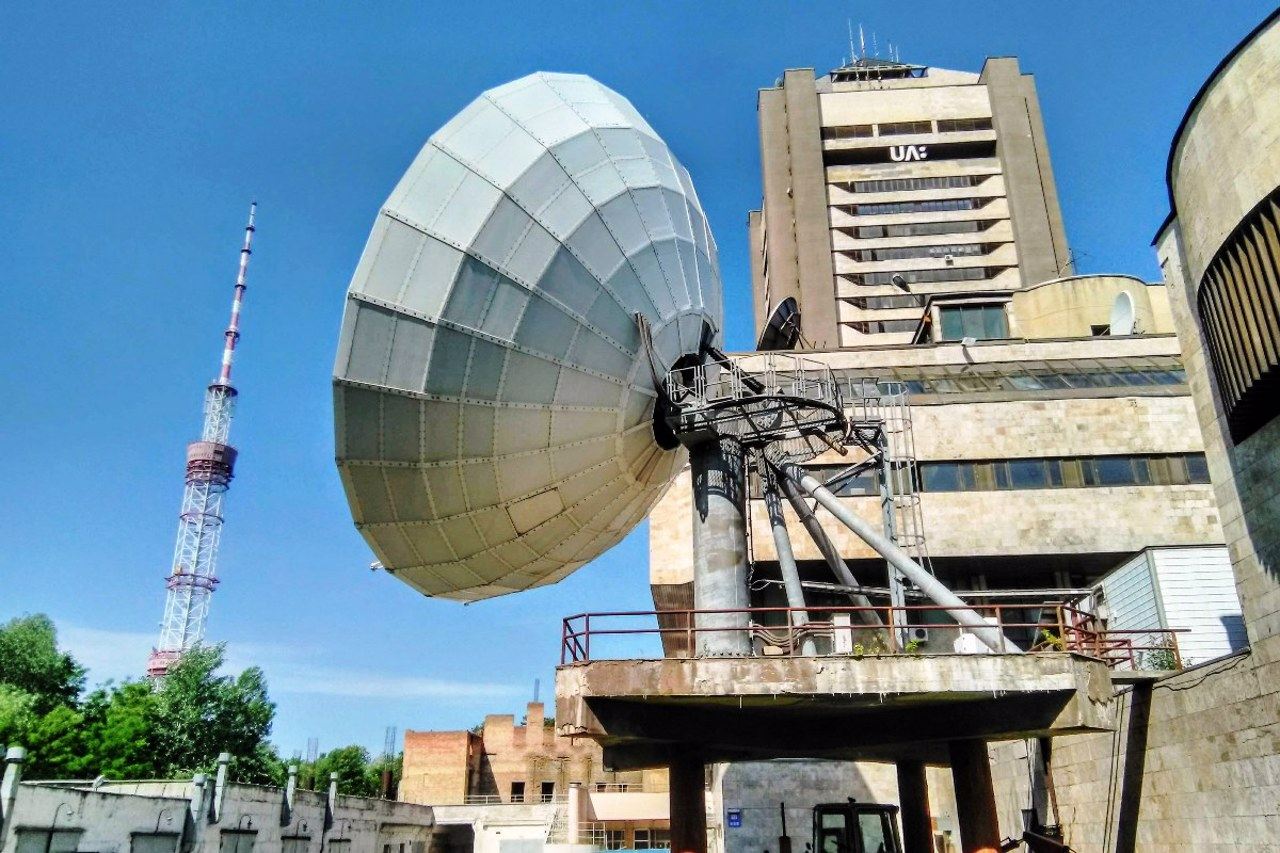
The Pencil experienced a great period of openness following a remodel in 2017.

By that time, the building had seen a significant reduction in outside tenants, with only one small retail kiosk remaining in operation. That kiosk was scheduled to cease operations by the end of the following year. In anticipation of a broader revitalization of the premises, the management opened up a number of spaces for new commercial and service-oriented uses. Potential areas within the building were earmarked for a variety of functions, including a pharmacy, cafés, pizzerias, and a postal service point. To ensure transparency and prevent favoritism in the allocation of these spaces, all proposals were managed through the Prozorro public procurement system.

On New Year's Eve of 2017, the television center opened its doors for the first time in history to host a public celebration opening the year of 2018, selling approximately 1,200 tickets. This was around the time that First National had been rebranded as UA:First. This event was the beginning of a broader transformation: the space was made accessible to the general public and began hosting regular cultural activities, such as outdoor film screenings, art exhibitions, and talks, hosted in the newly created UA:HUB, a flexible public-area lobby complete with workspaces, cafés, and event zones. The event proved a success, drawing over a thousand attendees and featuring six electronic music performers. A 3D mapping installation transformed the facade of the television center into a simulation resembling the hull of a spacecraft.

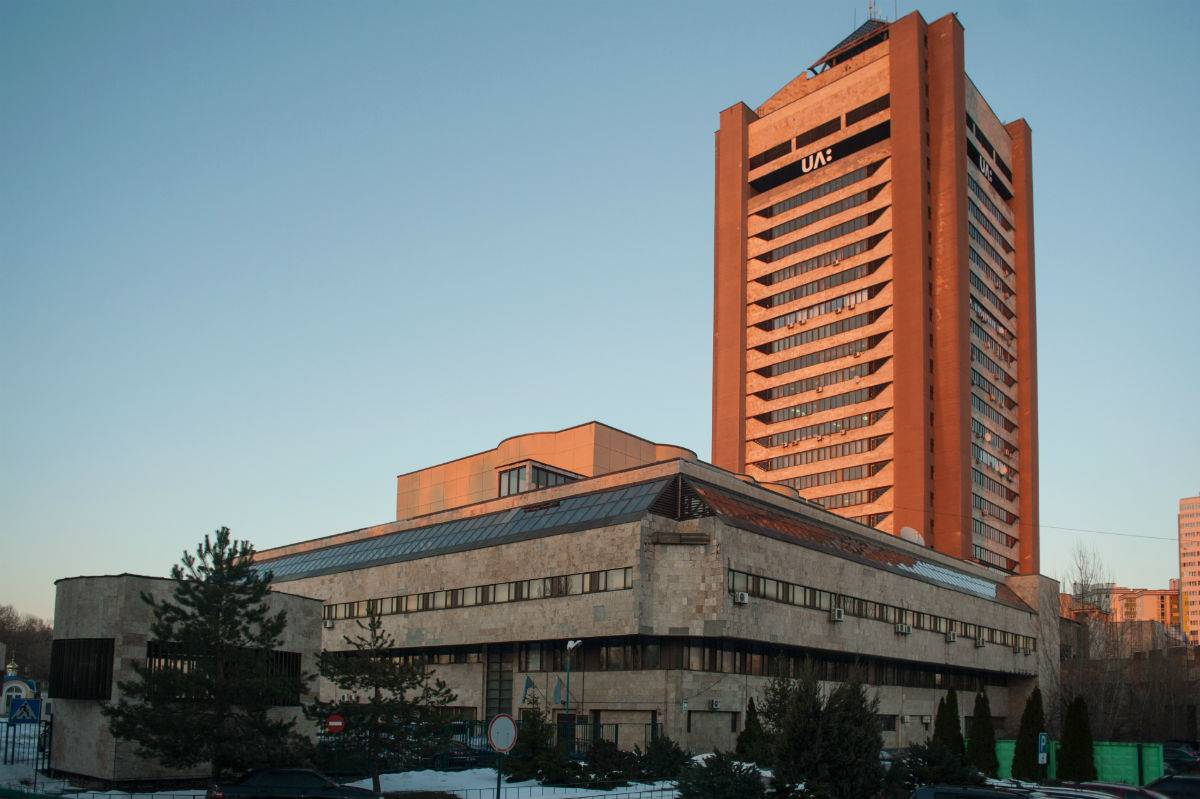
The Museum of Television was open to members of the public, prior to the Russian invasion of Ukraine.

Efforts were also made to engage staff in the party as well, using furniture left over from the Eurovision Song Contest to furnish communal areas. The staff, numbering around 1,700, included many long-serving employees accustomed to confidentiality and tradition, who were initially wary of these innovations. Their concerns about public events ranged from exposure to public scrutiny to fears of vandalism at events, fears proven unfounded when gatherings ended without incident or damage.

To promote transparency and internal cultural shifts, UA:First introduced a team of in-house vloggers producing a web series titled "So what is Suspilne?" The vloggers filmed behind-the-scenes moments, even interrupting meetings, to invite open dialogue and challenge the status quo, signaling a clear departure from old institutional habits.

In early February 2018, the television center hosted a photo exhibition showcasing historic Kyiv architecture, along with film screenings as part of the "New British Cinema" festival. Around the same time, in collaboration with the National Public Television and Radio Company of Ukraine (NPTU), the venue launched dedicated fan zones for the Winter Olympic and Paralympic Games. Within two weeks, the Olympic fan zone attracted approximately 10,000 visitors. Activities included live sports broadcasts, educational talks, skill-based workshops, and even demonstrations of curling in a scaled-down format.

=== 2022 Russian invasion ===
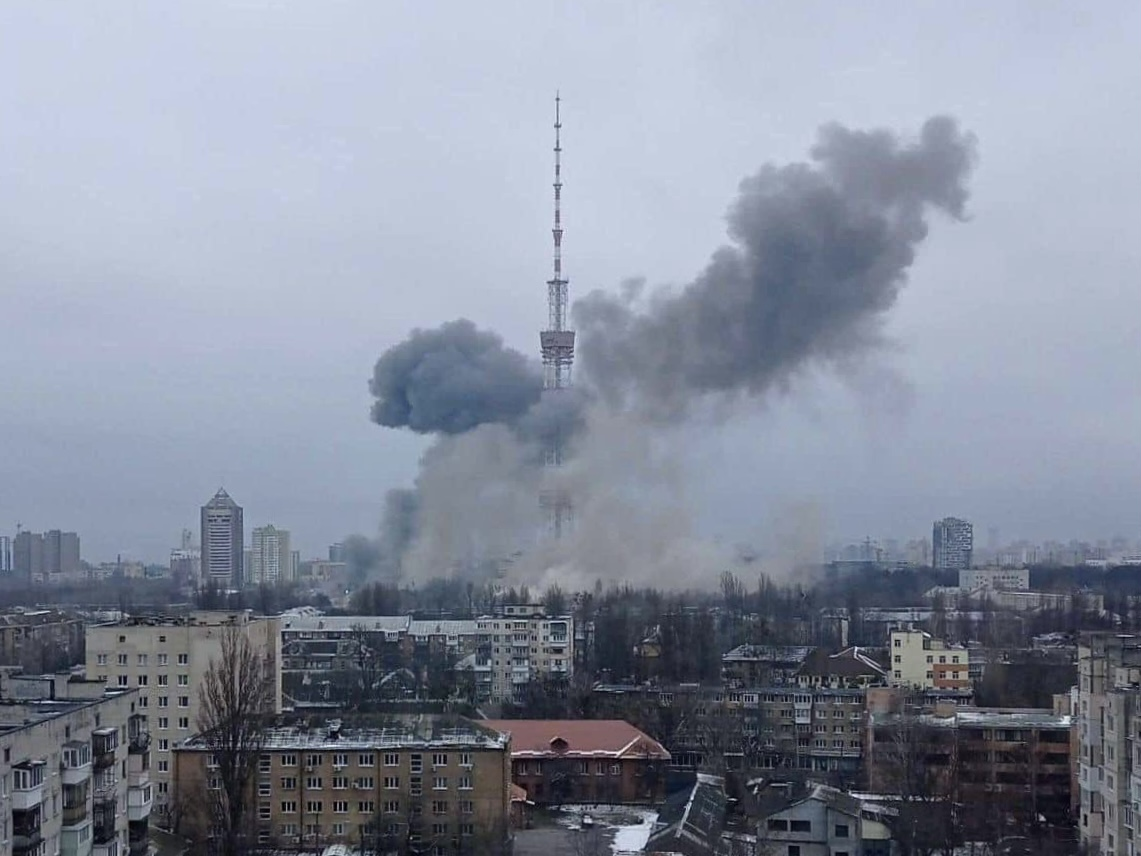
Russian bombardment of the Kyiv TV Tower. The Television Center can be seen in the center left of the frame.

On March 1, 2022, as part of the Russian invasion of Ukraine, Russian shells damaged the Kyiv TV Tower, and television crews deliberated on evacuating the TV Center, fearing the offices might be a credible target.

On March 8, 2022, the decision was then made to evacuate the Television Center, and relocate public television broadcasts to the old pre-independence TV headquarters at the Kyiv Television and Radio Center. This was primarily based on the consideration that during wartime, the elevators in the 22-story building would most likely become out of commission, and it would take too long to evacuate to the basement bomb shelters. However, conservation efforts were undertaken to ensure the building would remain usable when the danger was made all clear.

By June 2022, no one was left working in the building, and corporate management deliberated on carrying-out previously arranged renovations on the building. The center had been temporarily closed since the beginning of the full-scale war, and discussions were underway regarding its potential reconstruction. Before the invasion, there had been no plans to relocate from the facility; instead, a full renovation of all floors was intended, modeled after the Veteran Hub. Windows had already been ordered, and it was later discovered that they had been preserved in a warehouse near Kyiv and could still be retrieved.

== Architecture ==
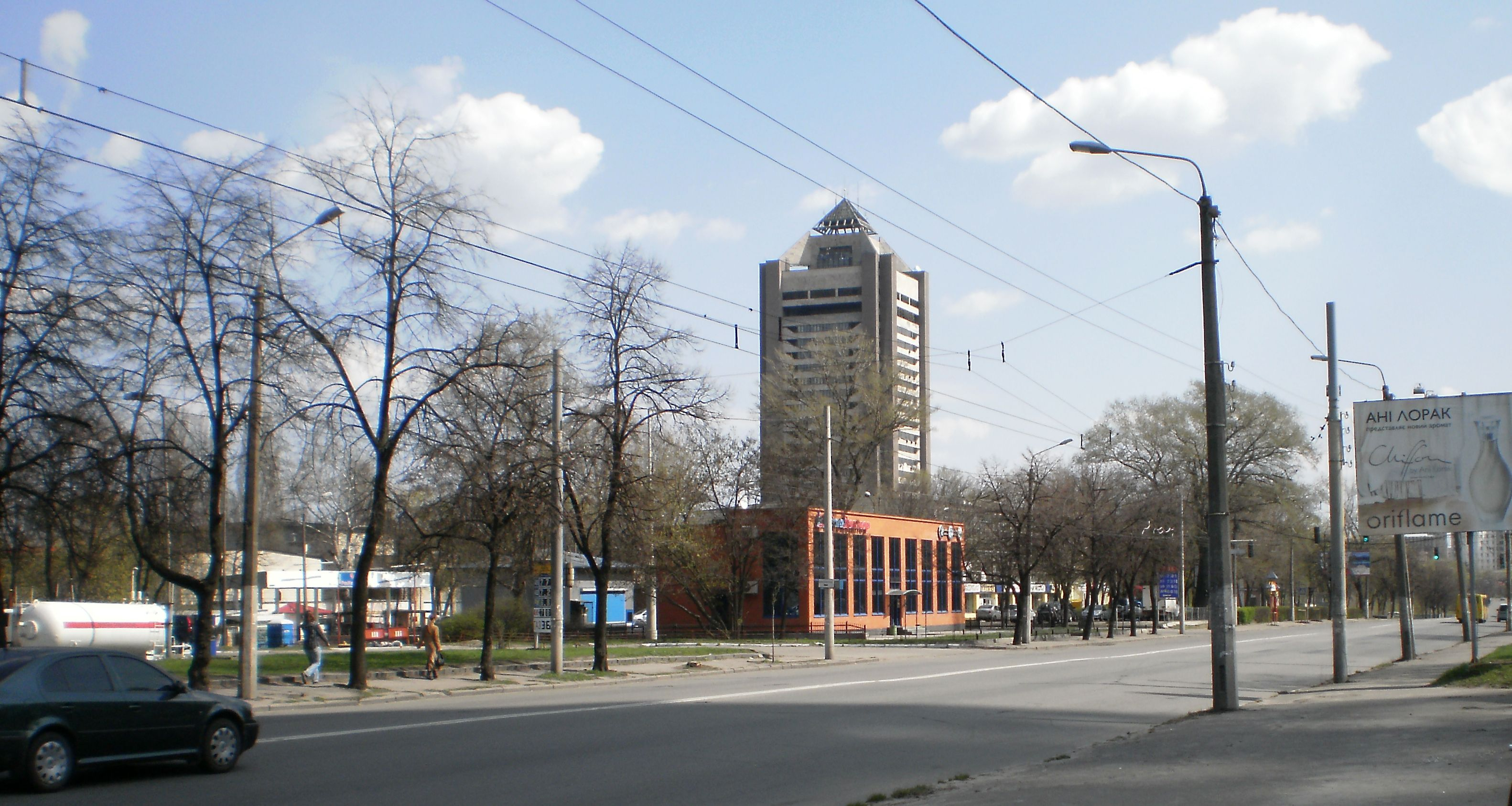
The Kyiv Television Center as seen from the street.

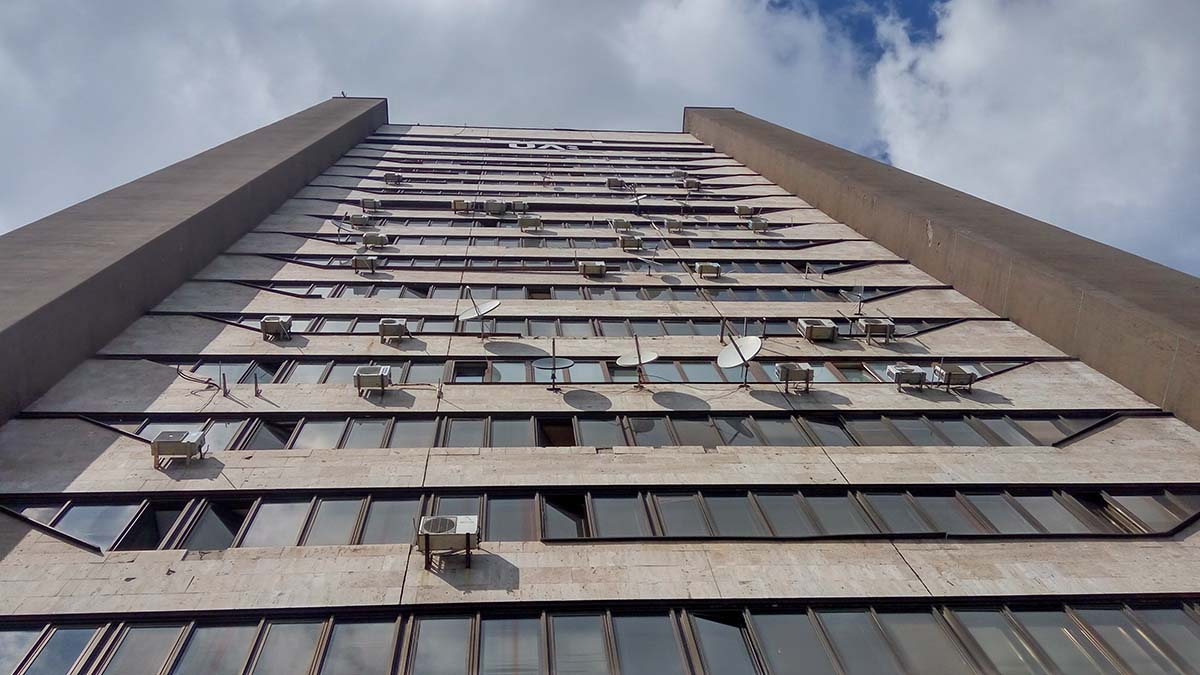
The Pencil has distinctive rows of ribbon windows.

The Pencil is one of the most prominent examples of late Soviet modernist architecture in Kyiv. Its most recognizable feature is a 20-story editorial skyscraper topped with a glass and aluminum pyramid. The tower stands above a wider base of studio buildings and is stylistically characterized by continuous ribbon windows, angular corners, and a color scheme dominated by golden-brown cladding.

The pyramid structure, which crowns the skyscraper, is illuminated at night. The distinctive pyramid is easily visible from much of the city's northern and northwestern districts. From vantage points in neighborhoods such as Kurenivka and Petrivka, the tall, narrow silhouette of the building visually dominates the skyline and, in certain perspectives, partially obscures the nearby television tower.

The Kyiv TV Center has had an impact on Kyiv's architectural landscape. Its distinctive form, particularly the pyramidal structure crowning the high-rise section, influenced subsequent architectural trends. In the 1990s, pyramidal roof elements began to appear in both public and residential buildings across the capital. Similar design features can be observed on the rooftops of the Left Bank Post Office, as well as apartment buildings on Metropolitan Andrey Sheptytsky and Zhmerynska Street.

The architectural concept extends to the building's interior. The tower appears to be elevated, with its base positioned above a seven-story-high open space. This area serves as a large lobby with wide staircases, terraces, pedestrian bridges, and internal galleries. Two central elevator shafts rise within the lobby, flanked by marble and metal finishes and embellished with mosaic artworks.

The complex was constructed using an uncommon method for Kyiv at the time. Initially, six reinforced concrete towers were built, four on the corners housing stairwells, and two central ones containing elevators. The structural spans between floors were created using 20-meter-long steel beams.

Originally, the design included a main entrance with a concert hall. However, this component of the building was never completed. Since the mid-1990s, access to the structure has been through a secondary corridor. Efforts to raise funds for the completion of the concert venue, including a televised fundraising campaign, were unsuccessful, and the unfinished entrance area remained in a state of disrepair.

Beyond its prominent above-ground structures, the complex features a substantial underground component, including a "safe haven" designed for continuity of operations during emergencies, an artifact of Cold War-era planning.
