= Shabolovka Telecenter =

Coordinates: 55.7182°N 37.6101°E

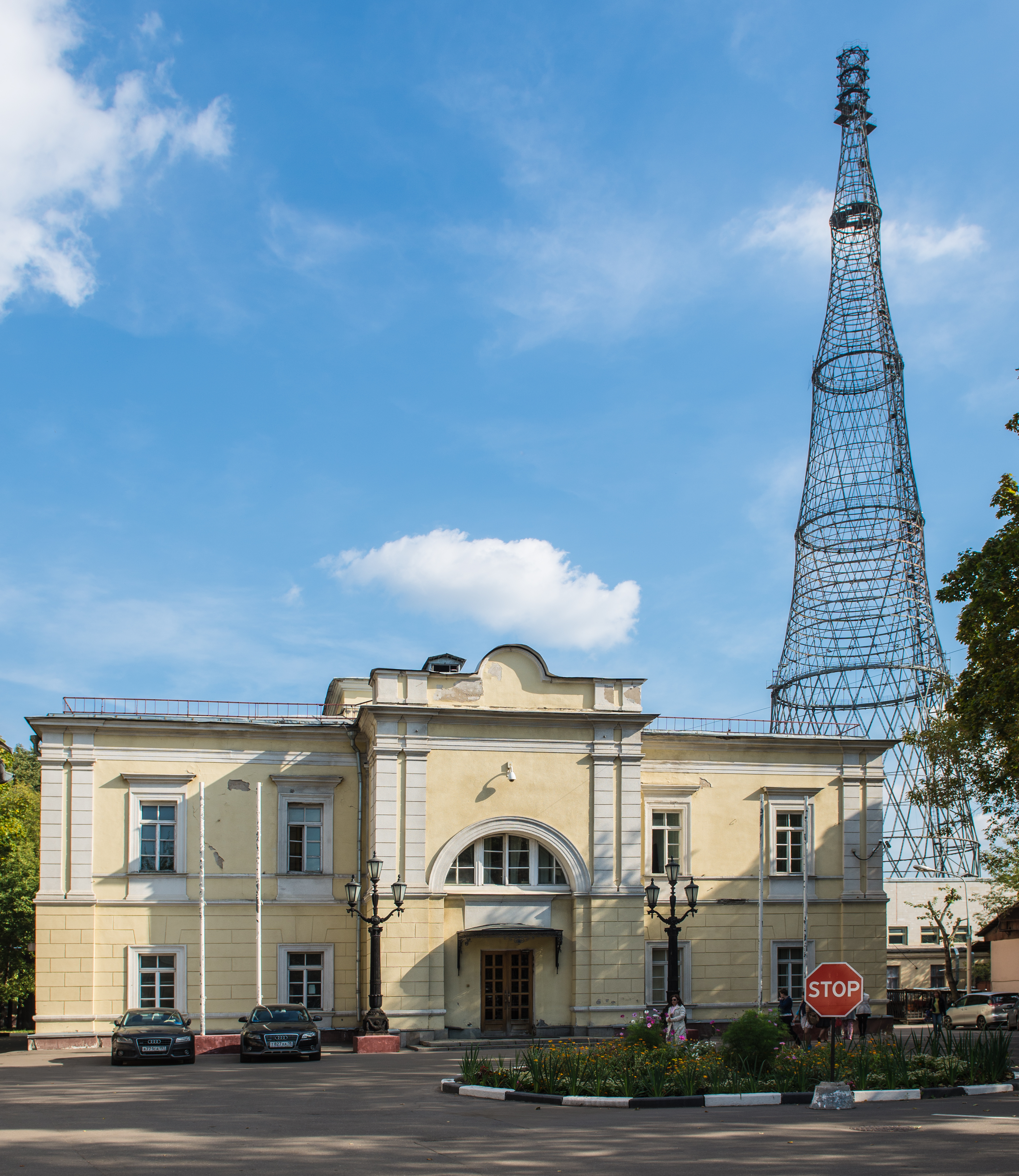
Shabolovka Telecenter and Shukhov Tower

Shabolovka Telecenter (Russian: Шаболовский телецентр) is a television and radio broadcasting center on Shabolovka Street in Moscow, at near of the Shukhov Tower. Until the opening of the Ostankino Technical Center in 1967, it was the main transmitting television center of the USSR. From the very beginning of television broadcasting in Moscow, viewers remembered the address of the television center, where bags of letters came in every day: Moscow, Shabolovka Street, 53 (the original address of the TV center).

On March 9, 1937, the TV center carried out the country's first experimental transmission of electronic television on the air. Since the end of 1937, the center began to conduct regular experimental television broadcasts on the system of electronic television.

In 1991, the technical complex on Shabolovka was transferred to All-Russia State Television and Radio Broadcasting Company (VGTRK). All VGTRK TV channels are broadcast from here, including Russia-1, Russia-K and Russia-24.
