= KVN-49 =

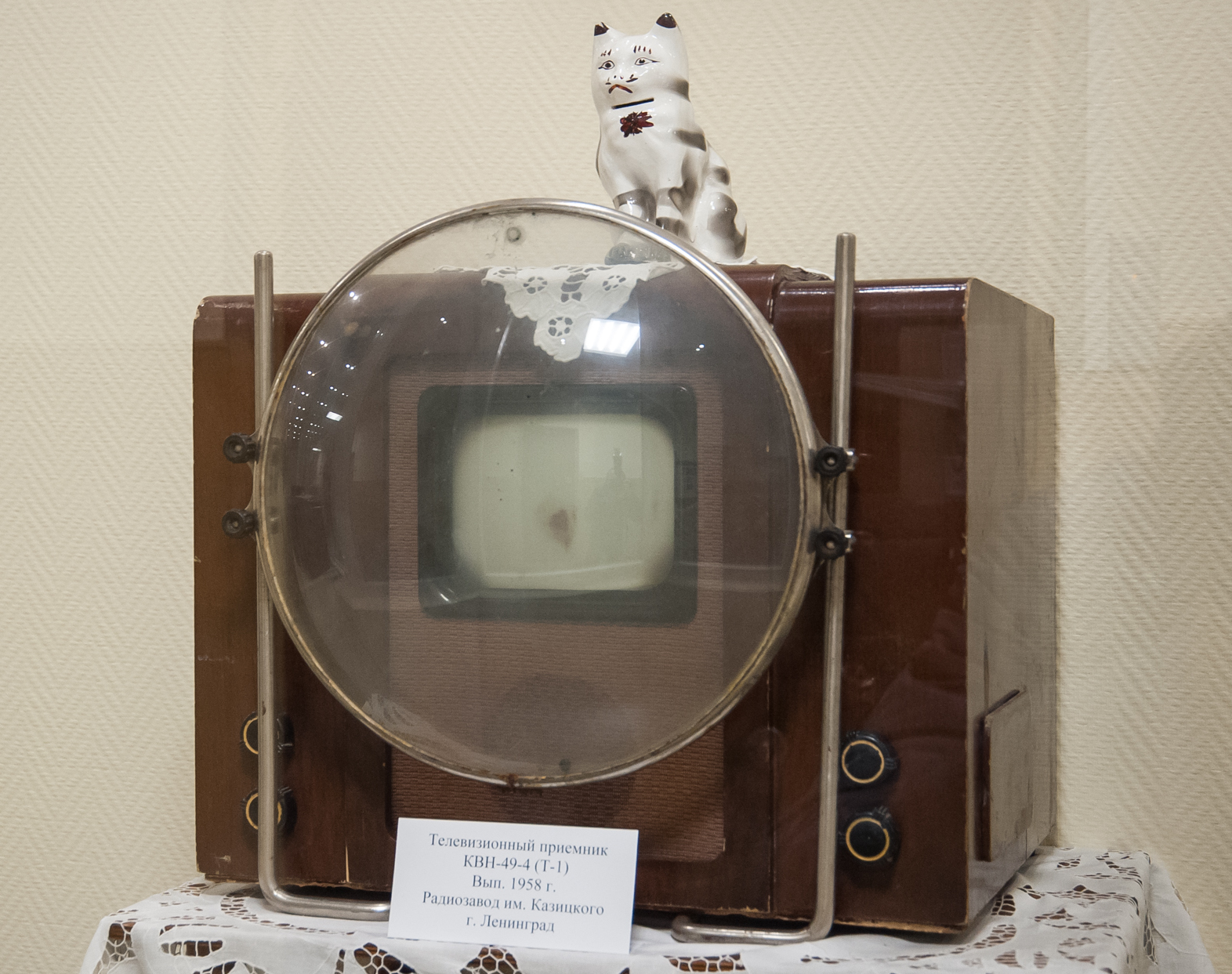
TV set KVN-49 at Mosfilm museum (Moscow)

KVN-49 (Russian: КВН-49) or Kenigson, Varshavskiy, Nikolayevskiy Mk. 1949 was a black-and-white TV set released in 1949 and on the market in the USSR until 1960, with some minor modifications. It was the first TV set ever mass-produced in the USSR.

== Specifications ==
- Television tube - 18LK1B (Russian: 18ЛК1Б) with round mirror, without an ion trap
- Ray focusing and deviation by a magnetic field, 3 coils (rows forming, framing and focusing)
- Image size - 105х140 mm
- Aspect ratio - 4:3
- Audio output - 1 W
- Additional equipment - plastic magnifying lens filled with distilled water or glycerol
- Power draw - 200 W (КВН-49-4), 216 (КВН-49-А and -Б)
- Dimensions - 380х490х400 mm
- Weight - 29 kg

== Mods ==
1. "КВН-49-1" - 1948 - 1950
2. "КВН-49-А" - 1950 - 1952
3. "КВН-49-Б" - 1952 - 1955
4. "КВН-49-4" - 1953 - 1958
5. "КВН-49-М" - 1954 - 1955
6. "КВН-49-4(А) first release" - 1955 - 1959
7. "КВН-49-4(А) second release" - 1959 - 1960

In 1962 KVN-49 production was finally stopped, and the factory which made it, the ARZ factory (Alexandrovskiy RadioZavod), began to produce a different TV set called the Record (Рекорд).

Over its history, as many as 2.5 million KVNs were produced.
