= Kyiv TV Tower =

385 m-high (1,263 ft) lattice steel tower

Kyiv Television Tower
- Київська телевежа
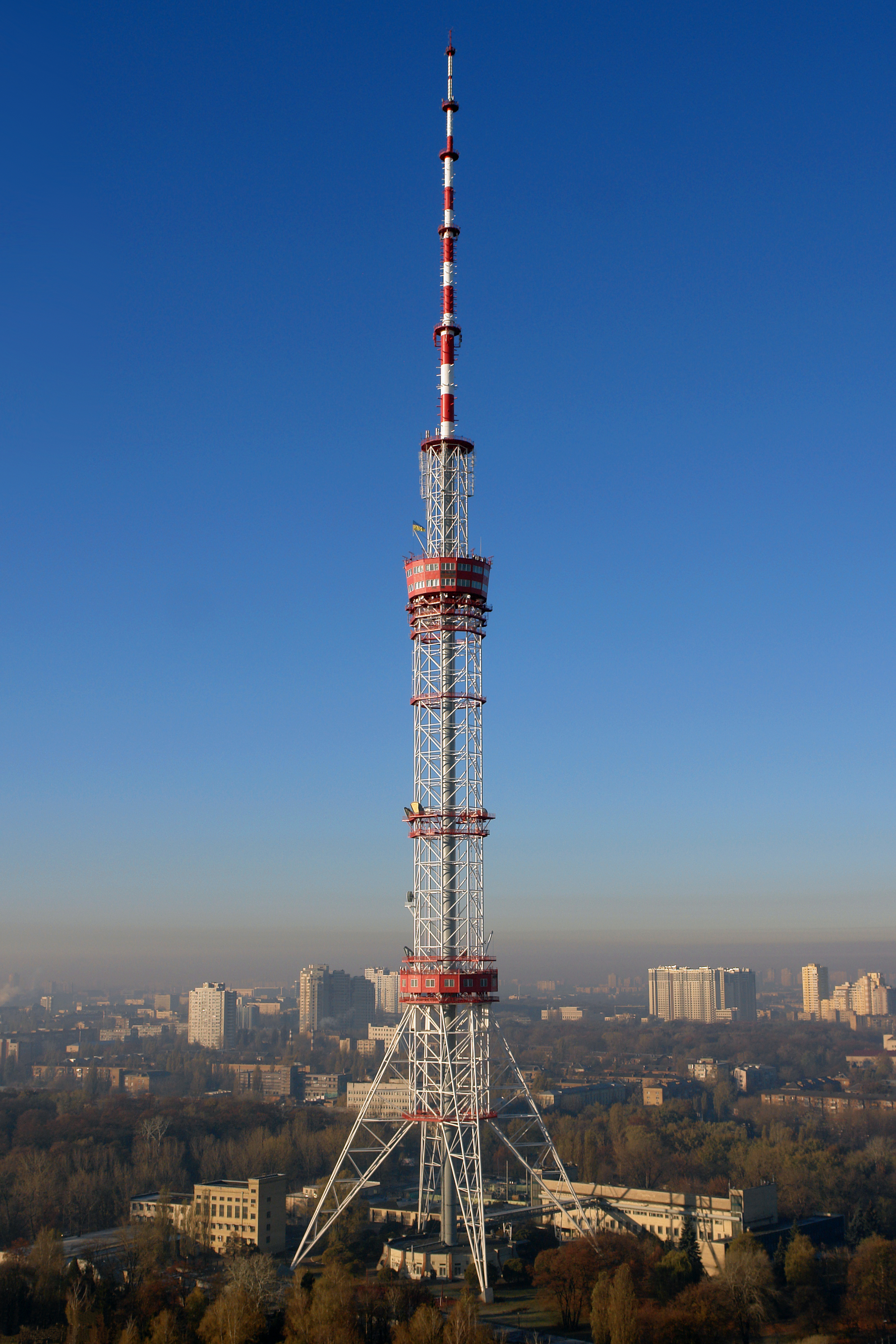
- Kyiv TV Tower in 2014

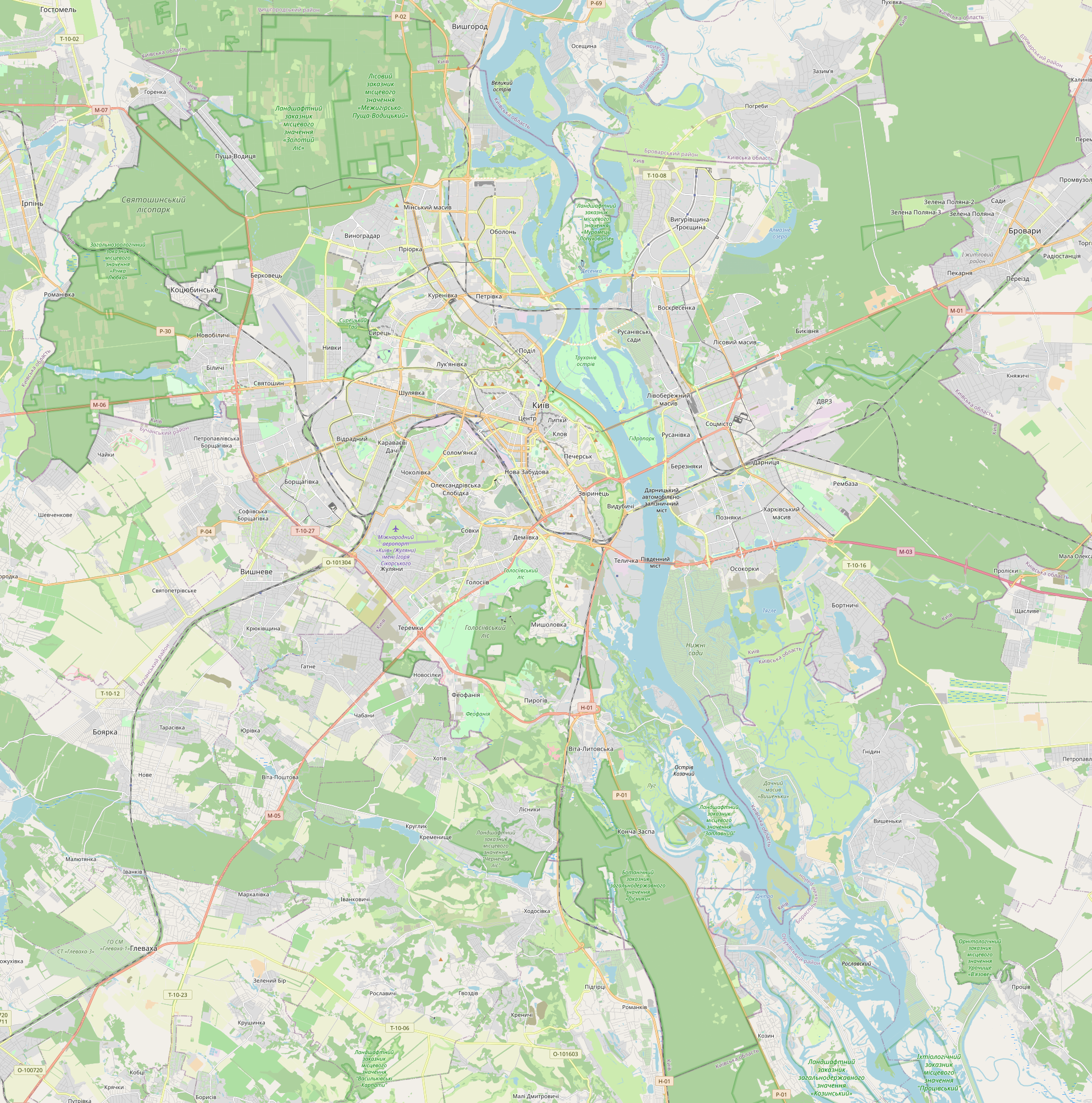
- Location within Ukraine Kyiv

General information
- Status: Completed
- Type: Steel lattice television tower
- Location: Kyiv, Ukraine
- Coordinates: 50°28′16″N 30°27′12″E
- Construction started: 1968
- Completed: 1973
- Opening: 1973, 2025
- Renovated: October 2024 - 2025
- Closed: 2022–2025

Height
- Height: 385 m (1,263 ft)

Technical details
- Lifts/elevators: 2

Design and construction
- Architect: Vitalii Shymanovskyi

The Kyiv TV Tower (Ukrainian: Київська телевежа, romanized: Kyivska televezha) is a 385 m-high (1,263 ft) lattice metal tower on Oranzhereina Street, Kyiv, Ukraine, and is the tallest structure in the country. The tower was built in 1973 while Kyiv was the capital of the Ukrainian SSR. The tower was the tallest freestanding metal structure in the world. It is used for radio and television broadcasting and is not open to the public. It is the second tallest lattice tower in the world and sixth tallest standing structure in Europe.

== History ==
The tower was first designed for Moscow, then the Soviet capital. But Moscow authorities preferred a more "solid" type of tower, which was eventually built (Ostankino Tower). Later, when Kyiv needed its own tower, the project was reintroduced. The Soviet government ordered the engineers to shorten the tower by almost 30%, so as not to be as tall as the Moscow one.

=== Location ===
The tower was built on top of the Jewish cemetery in Lukianivka. The cemetery was officially closed in 1966 and Jewish families were given six months to rebury their relatives in the Jewish areas of a new cemetery in the city. Since the relatives of the interred had been killed in the Babyn Yar massacre, most of the graves were not moved. After the headstones had been destroyed or removed, the antenna was built on top of the existing graves.

=== Construction ===
Construction began in 1968 and finished in 1973 at a cost of approximately $12 million. Made of steel pipe of various diameters and thicknesses, the structure weighs 2,700 metric tons (2,700 long tons; 3,000 short tons). The central pipe, or core, where the elevator is located, is 4 meters (13 ft) in diameter and made of pipe that is 12 mm thick. It sits on a four-legged base that is about 100 meters (330 ft) meters tall. Atop the base is an enclosed level which houses microwave transmitting and receiving equipment. At about 200 meters (660 ft) is a second enclosed level that houses television and FM transmitters, as well as a control and maintenance shop. This second level is the elevator's terminus.

The tower is unique in that no mechanical fasteners such as rivets are used in the structure: every joint, pipe, and fixture is attached by welding. It is the first all-welded tower in the world.

=== 2022 missile strike ===
Russian missile strike on 1 March 2022

On 1 March 2022, the tower was hit by a missile fired by Russian forces during the Battle of Kyiv as part of the Russian invasion of Ukraine. According to Ukrainian officials, five people were killed as a result. The dead included Yevhenii Sakun, the first journalist killed in the Russian invasion of Ukraine. Ukraine state advisor Anton Herashchenko accused the Russian army of trying to disrupt the city's communication infrastructure. According to The Kyiv Independent, Ukrainian TV channels' broadcasting was disrupted following the attack. It is unknown if the strike intended to topple the tower or if the intent was to disable its transmission and reception systems. The extent of the damage was not immediately apparent, and the tower remained standing.

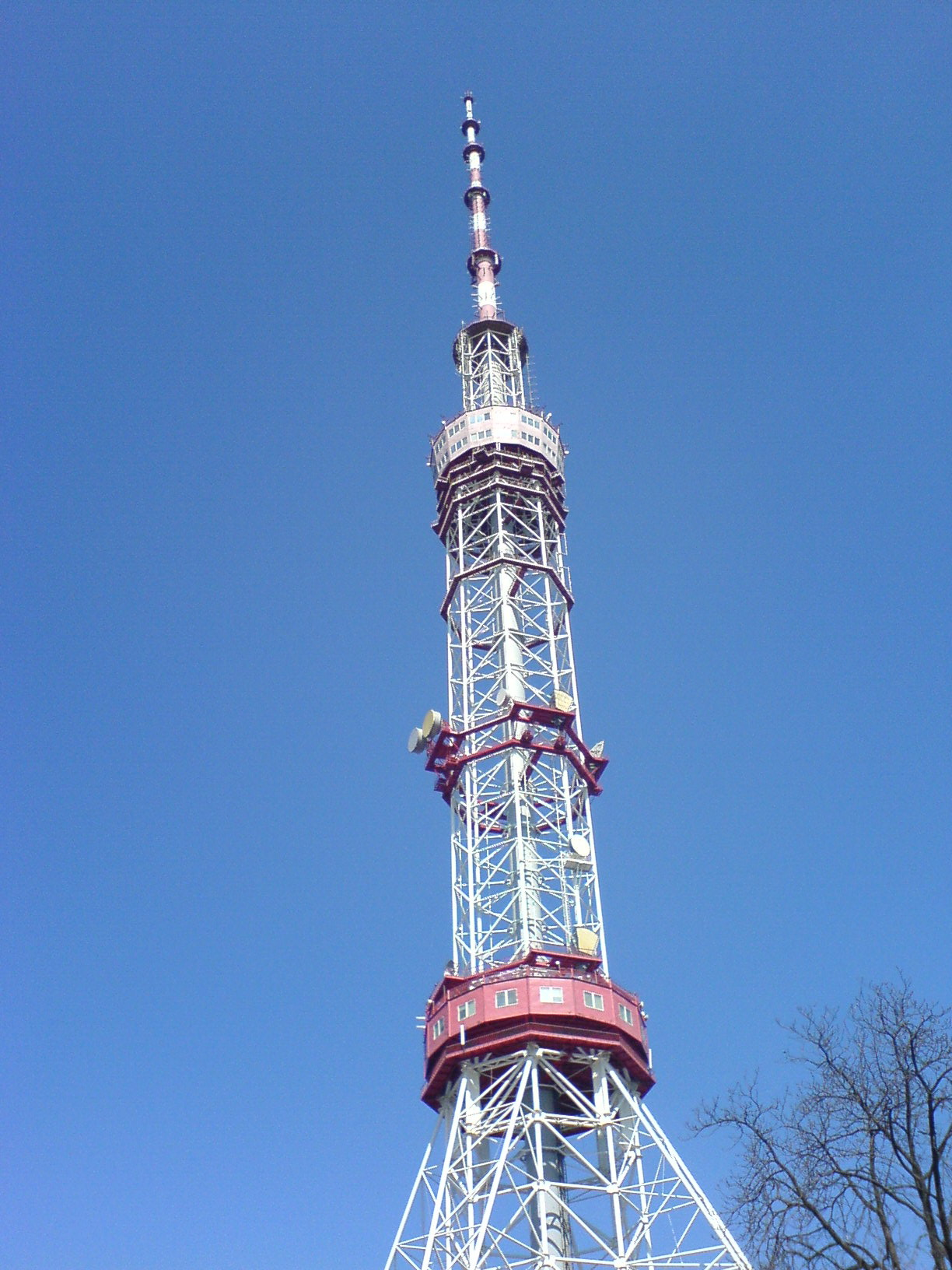
Kyiv TV Tower from ground level

The Ukrainian foreign ministry condemned the attack due to its proximity to the memorial to the Babi Yar massacres. The Babyn Yar Holocaust Memorial Center confirmed reports that a second missile had hit the nearby memorial, however there are contradicting reports.

== See also ==
- Lattice tower
- List of tallest towers in the world
- List of tallest structures in Europe
- List of tallest freestanding structures in the world
- List of tallest freestanding steel structures
- List of transmission sites

Records
Preceded by Tokyo Tower	World's tallest lattice tower 385 m (1263 ft); 1973–2010	Succeeded by Tokyo Skytree
