= Milton Berle =

American comedian and actor (1908–2002)

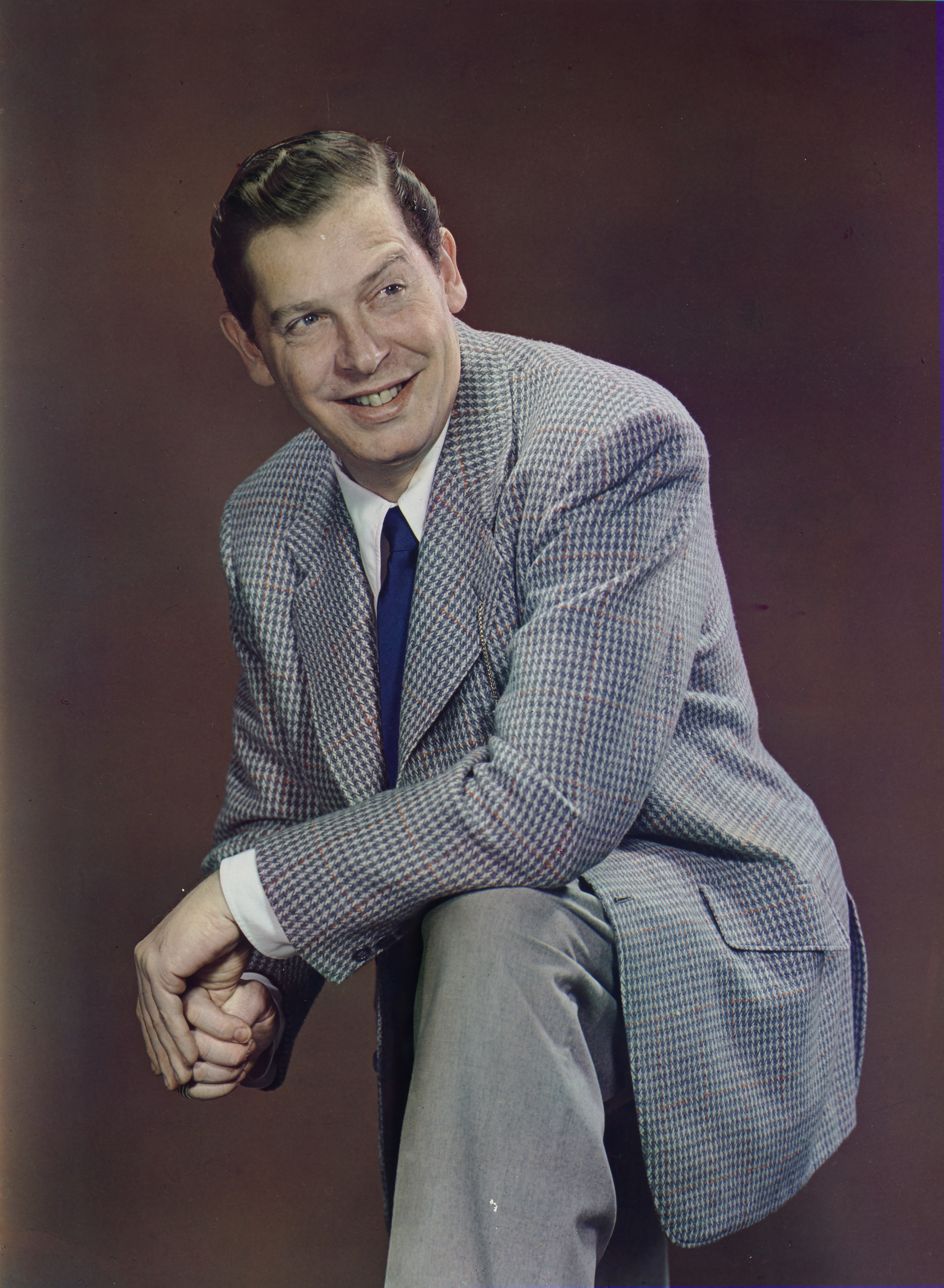
- Berle in a publicity photo, 1953
- Born: Mendel Berlinger; July 12, 1908; New York City, U.S.
- Died: March 27, 2002 (aged 93); Los Angeles, California, U.S.
- Resting place: Hillside Memorial Park Cemetery
- Other names: Mr. Television; Uncle Miltie; Mr. Tuesday Night
- Occupations: Actor; comedian
- Years active: 1913–2000
- Spouses: Joyce Mathews (m. 1941; div. 1947); (m. 1949; div. 1950); Ruth Cosgrove Rosenthal (m. 1953; died 1989); Lorna Adams (m. 1992)
- Children: 3

Milton Berle (born Mendel Berlinger; Yiddish: מענדעל בערלינגער; July 12, 1908 – March 27, 2002) was an American actor and comedian. His career as an entertainer spanned over eight decades, first in silent films and on stage as a child actor, then in radio, movies and television. As the host of NBC's Texaco Star Theatre (1948–1953), he was the first major American television star and was known to millions of viewers as "Uncle Miltie" and "Mr. Television" during the first Golden Age of Television. He was honored with two stars on the Hollywood Walk of Fame for his work in both radio and TV.

== Early life ==
Milton Berle was born into a Jewish family in a five-story walkup in the Harlem neighborhood of Manhattan. His given name was Mendel Berlinger, but he chose Milton Berle as his professional name when he was 16. His father, Moses Berlinger (1872–1938), was of German-Jewish descent and worked as a paint and varnish salesman. His mother, Sarah (Sadie) Glantz Berlinger (1877–1954), who was of Polish-Jewish ancestry, changed her name to Sandra Berle when Milton became famous. He had three older brothers. For many years, two of the brothers worked on Berle's TV production staff while Phil was a programming executive at NBC.

== Child actor ==
Berle entered show business in 1913 at the age of five when he won a children's Charlie Chaplin contest. He also worked as a child model and was "Buster Brown" for Buster Brown shoes. He appeared as a child actor in silent films. He claimed The Perils of Pauline as his first film appearance, playing the character of a young boy, although this has never been independently verified. In Milton Berle: An Autobiography, he explained that the director told him that he would portray a little boy who would be thrown from a moving train. He said, "I was scared shitless, even when he went on to tell me that Pauline would save my life. This is exactly what happened, except that at the crucial moment they threw a bundle of rags instead of me from the train. I bet there are a lot of comedians around today who are sorry about that."

By Berle's account, he continued to play child roles in other films: Bunny's Little Brother, Tess of the Storm Country, Birthright, Love's Penalty, Divorce Coupons and Ruth of the Range. Berle recalled, "There were even trips out to Hollywood—the studios paid—where I got parts in Rebecca of Sunnybrook Farm, with Mary Pickford; The Mark of Zorro, with Douglas Fairbanks, Sr.; and Tillie's Punctured Romance, with Charlie Chaplin, Mabel Normand and Marie Dressler." Berle's claim to have appeared in Tillie's Punctured Romance has been disputed by film historians including Glenn Mitchell, who in his book, The Chaplin Encyclopedia, writes that Berle's alleged role was most likely played by child actor Gordon Griffith.

In 1916, Berle enrolled in the Professional Children's School.

== Career ==
=== Vaudeville ===
Around 1920 at age 12, Berle made his stage debut in a revival of the musical comedy Florodora in Atlantic City, New Jersey, which later moved to Broadway. By the time he was 16, he was working as a master of ceremonies in vaudeville. He is also known to have played small bit parts in several silent films in the 1910s and 1920s, although his presence in some is disputed (see Filmography, below). In 1932, he starred in Earl Carrol's Vanities, a Broadway musical. By the early 1930s, he was a successful stand-up comedian, patterning himself after one of vaudeville's top comics, Ted Healy.

=== Rising star ===
In 1933, Berle was hired by producer Jack White to star in the theatrical featurette Poppin' the Cork, a topical musical comedy concerning the repealing of Prohibition. Berle also co-wrote the score for this film, which was released by Educational Pictures. Berle continued to dabble in songwriting: with Ben Oakland and Milton Drake, he wrote the title song for the RKO Radio Pictures release Li'l Abner (1940), an adaptation of Al Capp's comic strip, featuring Buster Keaton as Lonesome Polecat. Berle co-wrote a Spike Jones B-side, "Leave the Dishes in the Sink, Ma".

=== Radio ===
From 1934 to 1936, Berle appeared frequently on The Rudy Vallee Hour and attracted publicity as a regular on The Gillette Original Community Sing, a Sunday night comedy-variety program broadcast on CBS from September 6, 1936, to August 29, 1937. In 1939, he was the host of Stop Me If You've Heard This One with panelists spontaneously finishing jokes sent in by listeners.

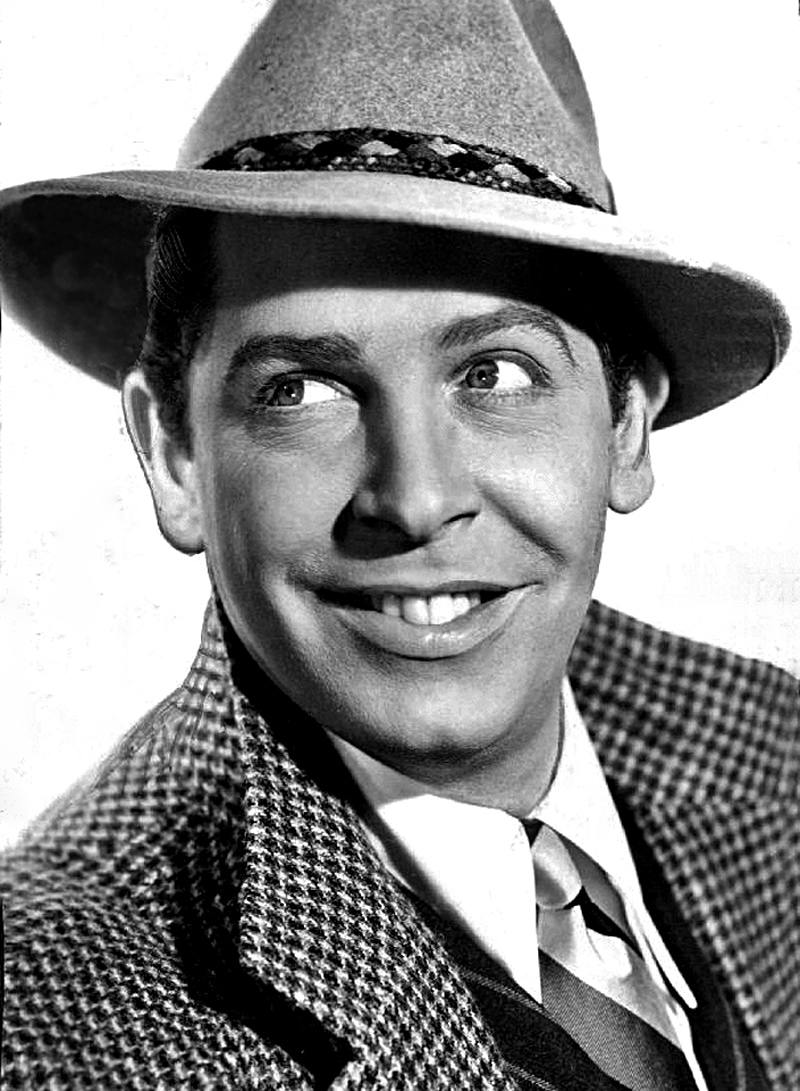
Berle in 1943

In the late 1940s, he canceled well-paying nightclub appearances to expand his radio career. Three Ring Time, a comedy-variety show sponsored by Ballantine Ale, was followed by a 1943 program sponsored by Campbell's Soups. The audience participation show Let Yourself Go (1944–1945) could best be described as "slapstick radio", with studio audience members acting out long-suppressed urges—often directed at host Berle. Kiss and Make Up on CBS in 1946 featured the problems of contestants decided by a jury from the studio audience with Berle as the judge. Berle also made guest appearances on many comedy-variety radio programs during the 1930s and 1940s.

Scripted by Nat Hiken and Aaron Ruben, The Milton Berle Show also featured Arnold Stang, later a familiar face as Berle's TV sidekick. Others in the cast were Pert Kelton, Mary Schipp, Jack Albertson, Arthur Q. Bryan, Ed Begley, Brazilian singer Dick Farney and announcer Frank Gallop. Sponsored by Philip Morris, it aired on NBC from March 11, 1947, until April 13, 1948. It ran for an additional season (with new sponsor Texaco), keeping the same format but running concurrently with Berle's better known TV series, from September 22, 1948, to June 15, 1949.

Berle later described this series as "the best radio show I ever did ... a hell of a funny variety show". It served as a springboard for Berle's emergence as television's first major star.

=== Mr. Television ===
Berle first appeared on television in 1929 in an experimental broadcast in Chicago which he hosted in front of 129 people. He would return to television 19 years later.

Berle would revive the structure and routines of his vaudeville act for his debut on commercial TV, hosting The Texaco Star Theatre on June 8, 1948, over the NBC Television Network. They did not settle on Berle as the permanent host right away; he was originally part of a rotation of hosts (Berle himself had only a four-week contract). Jack Carter was the host for August. Berle was named the permanent host that fall. Berle's highly visual style, characterized by vaudeville slapstick and outlandish costumes, proved ideal for the new medium. Berle modeled the show's structure and skits directly from his vaudeville shows and hired writer Hal Collins to revive his old routines.

Berle dominated Tuesday night television for the next several years, reaching the number one slot in the Nielsen ratings with as much as a 97% share of the viewing audience. Berle and the show each won Emmy Awards after the first season. Fewer movie tickets were sold on Tuesdays. Some theaters, restaurants, and other businesses shut down for the hour or closed for the evening so their customers would not miss Berle's antics. Berle's autobiography notes that in Detroit, "an investigation took place when the water levels took a drastic drop in the reservoirs on Tuesday nights between 9 and 9:05. It turned out that everyone waited until the end of the Texaco Star Theatre before going to the bathroom."

Television sales more than doubled after Texaco Star Theatre's debut, reaching two million in 1949. Berle's stature as the medium's first superstar earned him the sobriquet "Mr. Television". He also earned another nickname after ending a 1949 broadcast with a brief ad-libbed remark to children watching the show: "Listen to your Uncle Miltie and go to bed". Francis Craig and Kermit Goell's "Near You" became the theme song that closed Berle's TV shows.

Berle risked his newfound TV stardom at its zenith to challenge Texaco when the sponsor tried to prevent black performers from appearing on his show:

I remember clashing with the advertising agency and the sponsor over my signing the Four Step Brothers for an appearance on the show. The only thing I could figure out was that there was an objection to black performers on the show, but I couldn't even find out who was objecting. "We just don't like them," I was told, but who the hell was "we?" Because I was riding high in 1950, I sent out the word: "If they don't go on, I don't go on." At ten minutes of eight—minutes before showtime—I got permission for the Step Brothers to appear. If I broke the color-line policy or not, I don't know, but later on, I had no trouble booking Bill Robinson or Lena Horne.

Berle's mother Sadie was often in the audience for his broadcasts; she had long served as a "plant" to encourage laughter from his stage show audiences. Her unique, "piercing, roof-shaking laugh" would stand out, especially when Berle made an entrance in an outrageous costume. After feigning surprise he would "ad-lib" a response; for example: "Lady, you've got all night to make a fool of yourself. I've only got an hour!"

Berle asked NBC to switch from live broadcasts to film, which would have made possible reruns (and residual income from them); he was angered when the network refused. However, NBC consented to make a kinescope of each show. Later, Berle was offered 25% ownership of the TelePrompTer Corporation by its inventor, Irving Berlin Kahn, if he would replace cue cards with the new device on his program. He turned down the offer.

A frequent user of tranquilizers, Berle frequently endorsed Miltown on his show and became one of its leading advocates in 1950s America. Due to his promotion of the drug, Berle was dubbed "Uncle Miltown" by Time magazine.

For Berle's contribution to television, he was inducted to the Hollywood Walk of Fame in 1960.

Berle's imperious, abrasive and controlling manner on the show was the inspiration for the 1957 CBS Playhouse 90 production of "The Comedian". starring Mickey Rooney as egomanaical TV comic Sammy Hogarth, who ran his weekly show through explosive tantrums, intimidation, bullying and cruelty. Writer Ernest Lehman had been assigned to profile Berle for a magazine, and captured Berle's high-handedness so completely that the magazine declined to run it, but suggested he fictionalize it and recast it as a novella. When it was picked up for the show, Rod Serling wrote the teleplay.

John Frankenheimer directed the live production which received considerable acclaim. The cast included Edmond O'Brien, Kim Hunter and jazz singer Mel Tormé in his first dramatic role, portraying Hogarth's spineless brother Lester. While some speculated the play was based on Jackie Gleason's loud, controlling personality, Berle, aware the production echoed his own reputation, was quoted as saying, "I wasn't that bad". The episode won two Emmy Awards.

Comedian Carl Reiner cited Milton Berle as a major source of inspiration for Reiner's abrasive Alan Brady character, which he portrayed on The Dick Van Dyke Show. Reiner said about Berle, "In his early television days, he was known as a real harridan". Adding, "Not knowing what television was in those days, he'd make demands that couldn't be met".

=== TV decline ===
In 1951, NBC signed Berle to an unprecedented 30-year exclusive television contract. He would receive more than a million dollars over its term simply as a retainer, with any activities as "actor, producer, writer, or director" calling for "additional compensation."

In 1953, Texaco pulled out of sponsorship of the show but Buick picked it up, prompting a renaming as The Buick-Berle Show. The program's format was changed to include the backstage preparations for the variety show. Critics generally approved of the changes, but Berle's ratings continued to fall, and Buick pulled out after two seasons. "Berle's persona had shifted from the impetuous and aggressive style of the Texaco Star Theater days to a more cultivated but less distinctive personality, leaving many fans somehow unsatisfied."

By the time the again-renamed Milton Berle Show finished its only full season (1955–56), Berle was already becoming history—though his final season was host to two of Elvis Presley's earliest television appearances, April 3 and June 5, 1956. The final straw during that last season may have come from CBS's scheduling The Phil Silvers Show opposite Berle. Silvers was one of Berle's best friends in show business and had come to CBS's attention in an appearance on Berle's program. Bilko's creator-producer, Nat Hiken, had been one of Berle's radio writers.

Berle knew that NBC had already decided to cancel his show before Presley appeared. He later hosted the first television version of the popular radio variety series, The Kraft Music Hall from 1958 to 1959, but NBC was finding increasingly fewer showcases for its one-time superstar. By 1960, he was reduced to hosting a bowling program, Jackpot Bowling, delivering his quips and interviewing celebrities between the efforts of that week's bowling contestants.

=== Life after The Milton Berle Show ===
A poster of Berle's film Always Leave Them Laughing

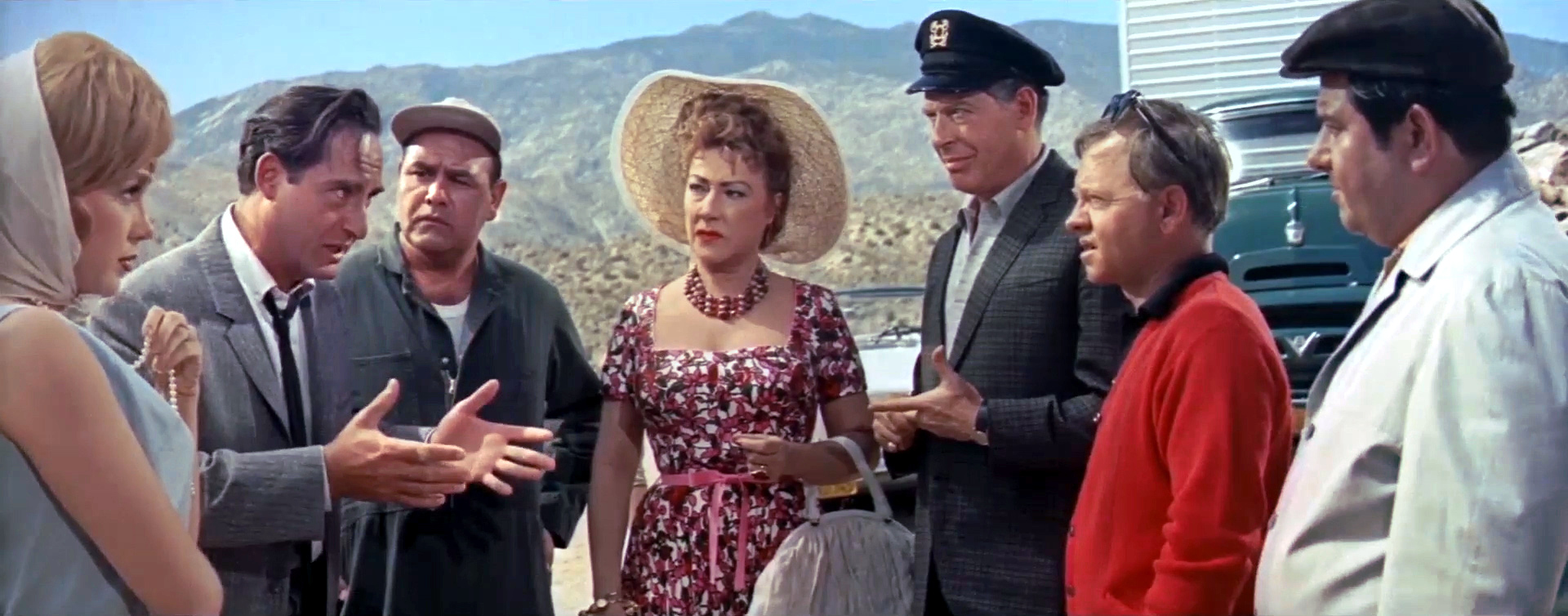
Left to right: Edie Adams, Sid Caesar, Jonathan Winters, Ethel Merman, Berle, Mickey Rooney and Buddy Hackett in It's a Mad, Mad, Mad, Mad World (1963)

In Las Vegas, Berle played to packed showrooms at Caesars Palace, the Sands, the Desert Inn, and other casino hotels. Berle had appeared at the El Rancho, the first Las Vegas Strip full service resort, starting in the late 1940s. In addition to constant club appearances, Berle performed on Broadway in Herb Gardner's The Goodbye People in 1968. He also became a commercial spokesman for the thriving Lum's restaurant chain.

He appeared in numerous films, including Always Leave Them Laughing (released in 1949, shortly after his TV debut) with Virginia Mayo and Bert Lahr; Let's Make Love with Marilyn Monroe and Yves Montand; It's a Mad, Mad, Mad, Mad World; The Loved One; The Oscar; Who's Minding the Mint?; Lepke; Woody Allen's Broadway Danny Rose; and Driving Me Crazy.

Freed in part from the obligations of his NBC contract, Berle was signed in 1966 to a new weekly variety series on ABC. Unrelated to the 1950s Texaco Star show, the new 1966 ABC series, also called The Milton Berle Show, made its debut on September 9, 1966, and ABC announced its cancellation within two months. The show failed to capture a large audience and was canceled after half a season, with the final show running on January 6, 1967.

Berle later appeared as guest villain Louie the Lilac on ABC's Batman series. Other appearances included stints on The Barbara Stanwyck Show, The Lucy Show, The Jackie Gleason Show, Get Smart, Laugh-In, The Sonny & Cher Comedy Hour, The Hollywood Palace, Ironside, F Troop, Fantasy Island, The Mod Squad, I Dream of Jeannie, CHiPs, The Muppet Show, and The Jack Benny Program.

Like his contemporary Jackie Gleason, Berle proved a solid dramatic actor and was acclaimed for several such performances, most notably his lead role in "Doyle Against the House" on The Dick Powell Show in 1961, a role for which he received an Emmy nomination. He played the part of a blind survivor of an airplane crash in Seven in Darkness, the first in ABC's Movie of the Week series. He played a dramatic role as a talent agent in The Oscar (1966) and was one of the few actors in that movie to get good notices from critics.

During this period, Berle was named to the Guinness Book of World Records for the greatest number of charity performances made by a show-business performer. Unlike the high-profile shows done by Bob Hope to entertain the troops, Berle did more shows, over a period of 50 years, on a lower-profile basis. Berle received an award for entertaining at stateside military bases in World War I as a child performer, in addition to traveling to foreign bases during World War II and the Vietnam War. The first charity telethon, for the Damon Runyon Cancer Research Foundation, was hosted by Berle in 1949. A permanent fixture at charity benefits in the Hollywood area, he was instrumental in raising millions for charitable causes.

=== Late career ===
On April 14, 1979, Berle guest-hosted NBC's Saturday Night Live. Berle's long-standing reputation for taking control of an entire television production—whether invited to do so or not—was a cause of stress on the set. He appeared skeptical about the show's satirical bent. One of the show's writers, Rosie Shuster, described the rehearsals for the Berle SNL show and the telecast as "watching a comedy train accident in slow motion on a loop." Upstaging, camera mugging, doing spit-takes, inserting old comedy bits, and climaxing the show with a maudlin performance of "September Song" complete with a pre-arranged standing ovation, something producer Lorne Michaels had never sanctioned, resulted in Berle being banned from hosting the show again. The episode was barred from being rerun until surfacing in 2003 because Michaels thought it brought down the show's reputation.

As a guest star on The Muppet Show, Berle was upstaged by the heckling theater critics Statler and Waldorf.

The Statler and Waldorf puppets were reportedly inspired by a recurring character named Sidney Spritzer, portrayed by comedian Irving Benson, who regularly heckled Berle from a theater box seat during episodes of The Milton Berle Show in the 1960s. Berle later made a cameo appearance in The Muppet Movie (1979), playing a used car salesman who trades Fozzie Bear’s 1951 Studebaker for a station wagon.

In 1974, Berle had a minor altercation with a younger actor/comedian Richard Pryor when both appeared as guests on The Mike Douglas Show. At the time, Berle was discussing the emotional fallout from an experience he had with impregnating a woman to whom he was not married, having to then decide whether or not they would keep the child. During his talk, Pryor let out a laugh, to which Berle took exception and confronted him, stating, "I wish, I wish, Richard, that I could have laughed at that time at your age when I was your age, the way you just laughed now, but I just couldn't ... I told you this nine years ago, and now I'll tell you on the air in front of millions of people: Pick your spots, baby." This prompted Pryor to mockingly quip back, "All right, sweetheart" in a Humphrey Bogart voice.

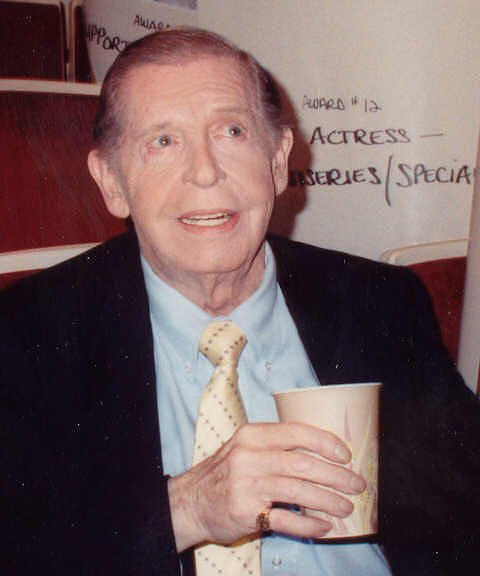
Berle at the 41st Primetime Emmy Awards in 1989

Another well-known incident of upstaging occurred during the 1982 Emmy Awards, when Berle and Martha Raye were the presenters of the Emmy for Outstanding Writing. Berle was reluctant to give up the microphone as the award's numerous recipients from Second City Television (SCTV) flooded the stage. Berle interrupted actor/writer Joe Flaherty's acceptance speech several times, with comments like, "Hurry up, we're 15 minutes over." After Flaherty made a joke about the size of the SCTV crew rivaling Hill Street Blues, Berle replied sarcastically, "That's funny." Flaherty's follow-up response of "Sorry, Uncle Miltie ... go to sleep," flustered Berle.

In 1984, Berle appeared in drag in the video for "Round and Round" by the 1980s metal band Ratt. His nephew Marshall Berle was then their manager. He also made a brief appearance in the band's "Back For More" video as a motorcyclist.

In 1985, he appeared on NBC's Amazing Stories, created by Steven Spielberg, in the episode "Fine Tunin'". In it, friendly aliens from space receive TV signals from the Earth of the 1950s and travel to Hollywood in search of their idols, Lucille Ball, Jackie Gleason, The Three Stooges, Burns and Allen, and Milton Berle. When Berle realizes the aliens are doing his old material, Uncle Miltie is thunderstruck: "Stealing from Berle? Is that even possible?" Speaking gibberish, Berle is the only person able to communicate directly with the aliens.

One of Berle's most popular performances in his later years was guest-starring in 1992 in The Fresh Prince of Bel-Air alongside Will Smith as womanizing, wise-cracking patient Max Jakey. Most of his dialogue was improvised and he shocked the studio audience by mistakenly blurting out a curse word.

He appeared in an acclaimed and Emmy-nominated turn on Beverly Hills, 90210 as an aging comedian befriended by Steve Sanders, who idolizes him, but is troubled by his bouts of senility due to Alzheimer's disease. He voiced the Prince of Darkness, the main antagonist in the Canadian animated television anthology special The Real Story of Au Clair De La Lune. He appeared in 1995 as a guest star in an episode of The Nanny as her lawyer and great uncle.

In 1994, Berle released a fitness videotape titled "Milton Berle's Low Impact/High Comedy Workout" which targeted seniors.

Berle was again on the receiving end of an onstage gibe at the 1993 MTV Video Music Awards when RuPaul responded to Berle's reference to having once worn dresses himself, during his old television days, with the quip that Berle now wore diapers. A surprised Berle replied by recycling a line he had delivered to Henny Youngman on his Hollywood Palace show in 1966: "Oh, we're going to ad lib? I'll check my brain and we'll start even."

== Offstage ==
In 1947, Milton Berle was one of the founding members of the Friars Club of Beverly Hills at the old Savoy Hotel on Sunset Boulevard. In 1961, the club moved to Beverly Hills. The Friars is a private show business club famous for its celebrity members and roasts, where a member is mocked by his club friends in good fun.

Berle avoided consuming drugs and alcohol but was an avid cigar smoker, womanizer, and gambler; primarily gambling on horse racing. His proclivity for the latter may have been responsible for Berle's never equaling the wealth of many of his contemporaries.

Although Berle "worked clean" for his entire career, excluding the Friars Club private celebrity roasts, he reportedly used profane language extensively in private.

=== Purported penis size ===
Berle was famous within show business for the rumored size of his penis. Phil Silvers once told a story about standing next to Berle at a urinal, glancing down, and quipping, "You'd better feed that thing, or it's liable to turn on you!" In the short story A Beautiful Child, Truman Capote quoted Marilyn Monroe as saying, "Christ! Everybody says Milton Berle has the biggest schlong in Hollywood."

At a memorial service for Berle at the New York Friars' Club, Freddie Roman solemnly announced, "On May 1st and May 2nd, his penis will be buried". In 2023, on episode 1478 of WTF with Marc Maron, Arnold Schwarzenegger recalled how he joked during Berle's eulogy, saying, "Look, even though the son of a bitch is dead, they still had a difficult time putting the top on his casket".

Radio shock jock Howard Stern barraged Berle with an array of penis questions during his appearances on Stern's morning talk show in 1988 and 1996. In Berle's 1988 appearance, when fielding phone calls, Stern purposely asked his producer to air only callers whose questions dealt with Berle's penis.

In his autobiography, Berle tells of a man who accosted him in a steam bath and challenged him to compare sizes, leading a bystander to remark, "Go ahead, Milton, just take out enough to win". Berle attributed this line to comedian Jackie Gleason and said, "It was maybe the funniest spontaneous line I ever heard". In the oral history Live From New York: An Uncensored History of Saturday Night Live, SNL writer Alan Zweibel describes how Berle opened his bathrobe in his dressing room to show his penis size to Zweibel, only to have cast member Gilda Radner walk into an uncomfortable scene.

== Personal life ==
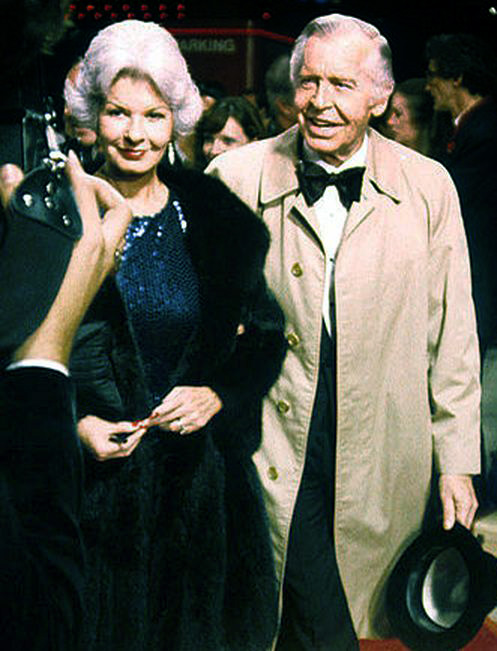
Milton Berle and Ruth Cosgrove Berle, 1979.

After twice marrying and divorcing showgirl Joyce Mathews, Berle married publicist Ruth Cosgrove (née Rosenthal) in 1953. She died of cancer in 1989. In 1989, Berle stated his mother was behind the breakup of his marriages to Mathews. He also said his mother's interference in his romantic life damaged his early relationships: "My mother never resented me going out with a girl, but if I had more than three dates with one girl, Mama found some way to break it up."

In 1992, he married a fourth time to Lorna Adams, a fashion designer 30 years his junior. He had three children, Victoria (adopted by Berle and Mathews), William (adopted by Berle and Cosgrove) and a biological son, Bob Williams, with showgirl Junior Standish (née Jean Dunne Arthur; 1925–2006). Berle had two stepdaughters from his marriage to Adams. He also had three grandchildren. Actor Ernie Kovacs died in an auto crash after leaving the 1962 baby shower for the adoption of William Berle.

Berle's autobiography contains many tales of his supposed sexual exploits. He claimed relationships with numerous famous women including Marilyn Monroe and Betty Hutton, columnist Dorothy Kilgallen, and evangelist Aimee Semple McPherson. The veracity of some of these claims has been questioned. The McPherson story, in particular, has been challenged by McPherson's biographer and her daughter, among others.

Berle was a Christian Scientist for twenty years. Oscar Levant, when queried by Jack Paar about Berle's adoption of Christian Science, quipped, "Our loss is their loss."

Berle was a Democrat who endorsed Lyndon B. Johnson in the 1964 United States presidential election.

== Final role and death ==
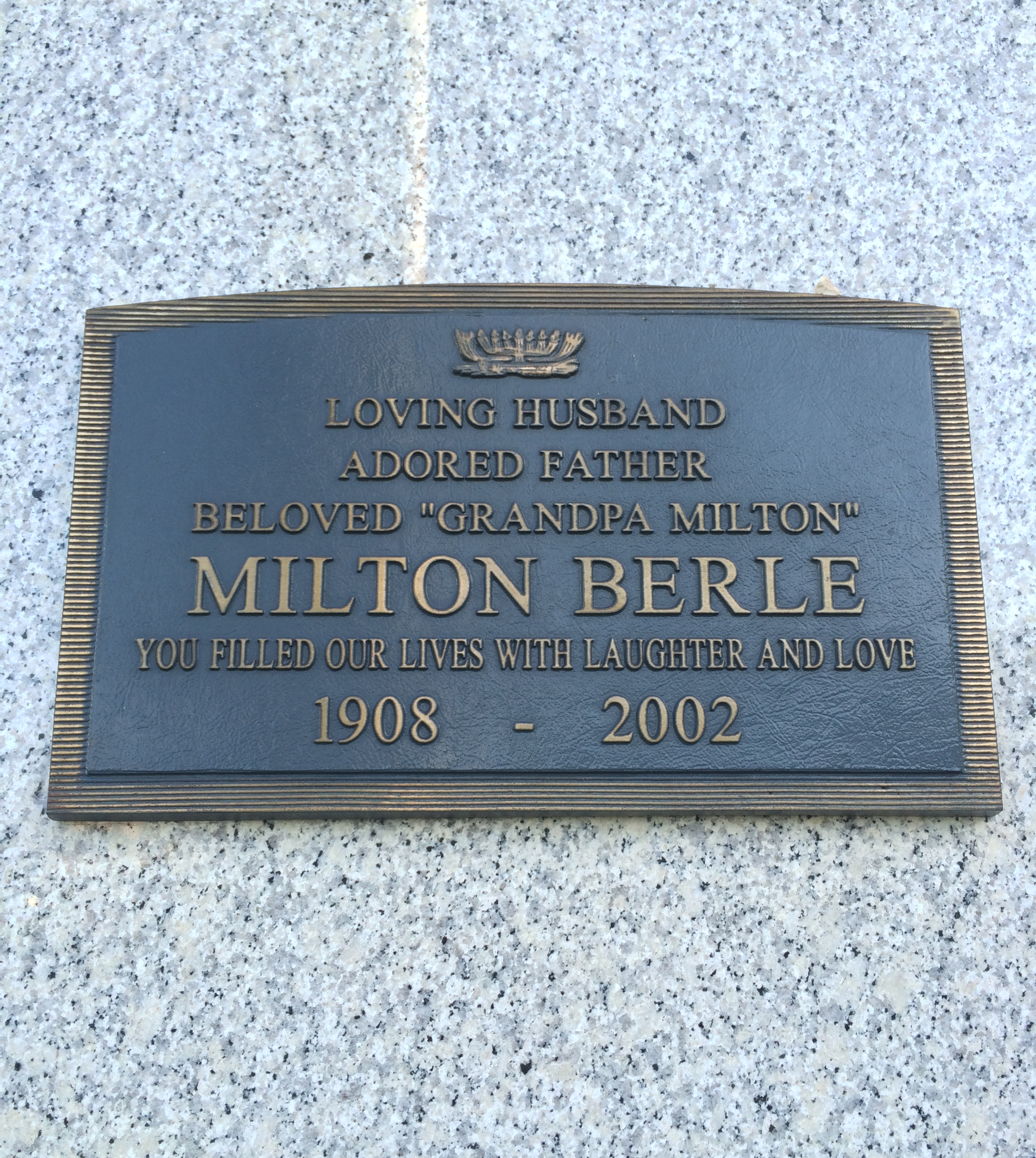
The crypt of Milton Berle, at Hillside Memorial Park

Berle guest-starred as Uncle Leo in the Kenan & Kel special "Two Heads Are Better than None", which premiered in 2000. This would be his last acting role.

In April 2001, Berle announced that a malignant tumor had been found in his colon, but he had declined surgery. Berle's wife said the tumor was growing so slowly that it would take 10 to 12 years to affect him in any significant or life-threatening way. One year after the announcement, on March 27, 2002, Berle died in Los Angeles from colon cancer. He died on the same day as Dudley Moore and Billy Wilder.

Berle reportedly left arrangements to be buried with his second wife, Ruth, at Mount Sinai Memorial Park Cemetery in Burbank, but his body was cremated and interred at Hillside Memorial Park Cemetery in Culver City. Warren Cowan, Berle's publicist, told The New York Times, "I only know he told me he bought plots at Hillside, and it was his idea." Many celebrities attended his funeral. In addition to his third wife, Lorna Adams, Berle was survived by his three children and extended family.

== Honors and awards ==
- Berle won the Emmy for Most Outstanding Kinescoped Personality in 1950, the same year his show, the Texaco Star Theater, won the Emmy for Best Kinescope Show. He was twice nominated for Emmys for his acting, in 1962 and 1995. In 1979, Berle was awarded a special Emmy Award, titled "Mr. Television."
- The Hollywood Walk of Fame, on February 8, 1960, inducted Berle with two stars, for television and radio.
- Berle was in the first group of inductees into the Television Hall of Fame in 1984.
- On December 5, 2007, California Governor Arnold Schwarzenegger and First Lady Maria Shriver inducted Berle into the California Hall of Fame, located at The California Museum for History, Women and the Arts.

== Broadway ==
- Earl Carroll's Vanities of 1932 (1932) – revue – in the roles of "Mortimer" in the sketch "Mourning Becomes Impossible", "Joe Miller, Jr." in "What Price Jokes", "Frank" in "Two Sailors", "Paul" in "The Cabinet of Doctor X", the "Announcer" in "Studio W.M.C.A." the "Defendant" in "Trial by Jury" and "Milton" in "The Bar Relief"
- Saluta (1934) – musical – co-lyricist and performer cast in the role of "'Windy' Walker"
- See My Lawyer (1939) – play – performer cast in the role of "Arthur Lee"
- Ziegfeld Follies of 1943 (1943) – revue – performer in the role of "Cecil" in Counter Attack, "J. Pierswift Armour" in The Merchant of Venison, "Perry Johnson" in Loves-A-Poppin, "Escamillio" in Carmen in Zoot, "Charlie Grant" Mr Grant Goes To Washington, "'The Micromaniac' Singer" and "'Hold That Smile' Dancer"
- I'll Take the High Road (1943) – play – co-producer
- Seventeen (1951) – musical – co-producer
- The Goodbye People (1968) – performer cast in the role of "Max Silverman"

== Selected filmography ==
- 1914: The Perils of Pauline (credit disputed)
- 1915: Fanchon the Cricket, Bit Role (uncredited)
- 1917: Rebecca of Sunnybrook Farm, Bit Part (uncredited)
- 1920: Birthright
- 1920: The Mark of Zorro as Boy (uncredited)
- 1921: Little Lord Fauntleroy as Boy (uncredited)
- 1922: Tess of the Storm Country, Bit Role (uncredited)
- 1923: Ruth of the Range, Bit Role (uncredited)
- 1933: Poppin' the Cork as Elmer Brown
- 1937: New Faces of 1937 as Wallington Wedge
- 1938: Radio City Revels as Teddy Jordan
- 1940: Li'l Abner (title song with Ben Oakland and Milton Drake)
- 1941: Tall, Dark and Handsome as Frosty Welch
- 1941: The Great American Broadcast as Radio Announcer (scenes deleted)
- 1941: Sun Valley Serenade as Nifty Allen
- 1941: Rise and Shine as Seabiscuit
- 1942: A Gentleman at Heart as Lucky Cullen
- 1942: Whispering Ghosts as H.H. Van Buren
- 1942: Over My Dead Body as Jason Cordry
- 1943: Margin for Error as Moe Finkelstein
- 1949: Always Leave Them Laughing as Kipling 'Kip' Cooper
- 1959: Lucy-Desi Comedy Hour "Milton Berle Hides Out at The Ricardos'" as himself
- 1960: The Bellboy as himself / Bellboy (uncredited)
- 1960: Let's Make Love as himself (uncredited)
- 1961: The Ladies Man as himself (scenes deleted)
- 1963: It's a Mad, Mad, Mad, Mad World as J. Russell Finch
- 1965: The Loved One as Mr. Kenton
- 1966: The Oscar as Kappy Kapstetter
- 1966: Don't Worry, We'll Think of a Title as Bookstore Customer with Rope (uncredited)
- 1967: The Happening as Fred
- 1967: Who's Minding the Mint? as Luther Burton
- 1967: The Big Valley (Season 3, Episode 3, A Flock of Trouble) as Josiah Freeman
- 1967: Batman (Season 3, Episode 7, "Louie the Lilac") as Louie the Lilac
- 1968: Where Angels Go, Trouble Follows as The Movie Director: The 'In' Group
- 1968: For Singles Only as Mr Parker
- 1969: Can Heironymus Merkin Ever Forget Mercy Humppe and Find True Happiness? as Goodtime Eddie Filth
- 1969: Seven in Darkness as Sam Fuller
- 1971: That Girl (Season 5, Episode 15, Those Friars) as himself
- 1972: Evil Roy Slade as Harry Fern
- 1972: Journey Back to Oz as The Cowardly Lion (voice)
- 1975: Lepke as Mr. Meyer
- 1976: Won Ton Ton, the Dog Who Saved Hollywood as Blind Man
- 1976: Let's Make a Deal (playing for a home viewer)
- 1978: Hey, Abbott! as himself (voice)
- 1979: The Muppet Movie as Mad Man Mooney
- 1980: CHiPs as himself
- 1981: General Hospital as Micky Miller
- 1981: The Fall Guy
- 1983: Cracking Up as Ms. Sultry
- 1984: Broadway Danny Rose as himself
- 1984: The 1st TV Academy Hall of Fame as himself/winner
- 1984: Music Video with Ratt & Milton Berle, "Round and Round"
- 1985: Pee-wee's Big Adventure as himself (uncredited)
- 1985: Amazing Stories as himself
- 1988: Side by Side as Abe Mercer
- 1989: Going Overboard as himself (uncredited)
- 1991: Trabbi Goes to Hollywood as Hotel Clerk
- 1991: Shakes the Clown as Male Clown Barfly (uncredited)
- 1992: The Fresh Prince of Bel-Air as Max Jakey
- 1992: The Real Story of Au Clair De La Lune as The Prince of Darkness (voice)
- 1993: Matlock "The Last Laugh" as Harvey Chase
- 1995: Beverly Hills, 90210 as Saul Howard
- 1995: The Nanny as Uncle Manny
- 1995: Roseanne as Transvestite at Wedding (uncredited)
- 1995: The 4th of July Parade as Ice Cream Man
- 1996: Due South as Shelley Litvak
- 1996: Storybook as Illuzor
- 1996: Sister, Sister (TV Series) The Volunteers as Edgar Boggs
- 2000: Kenan & Kel as Uncle Leo (final film role)
