= Topal =

Topal may refer to:

- Topal (surname), a surname of Turkish origin
- Topal, Astrakhan Oblast, Russia
- Topal, a Turkish Cypriot folk dance

== See also ==
- Topol (disambiguation)
- Topal Osman
