= Topolski =

Topolski (feminine: Topolska, plural: Topolscy) is a Polish surname. It may refer to:

- Carol Topolski (born 1949), an English novelist
- Daniel Topolski (1945–2015), an author, former rower and rowing coach, and broadcaster on BBC Radio
- Feliks Topolski (1907–1989), a Polish-British expressionist painter
- Jerzy Topolski (1928–1998), a Polish historian
- Joshua Topolsky (born 1977, Pittsburgh), an American technology journalist, co-founder and editor-in-chief of technology news network The Verge, and a US music producer and drummer under the stage name Joshua Ryan.
- Robb Topolski, an American computer networking expert
- Konrad Topolski, physicist, notes collector and body builder

== See also ==
- Topol (disambiguation)
- Topolski Century
