= Topol (surname) =

Topol is a surname. Common in Central (Czech Republic, Poland) and Eastern Europe (Ukraine, and Russia), it originated as a place-related name for "someone who lived by a poplar tree". It is also found among Ashkenazic Jewish people speaking Eastern Yiddish and likewise refers to the poplar tree, having been borrowed from a Slavic language (Proto-Slavic *topolь). Related surnames include Topiol, Topolansky, Topoliansky, Topolski (common in Poland), and Topolsky.

Notable people who share this surname include:

- Brad Topol (born c. 1971), American computer scientist
- Chaim Topol (1935–2023), Israeli actor, often billed mononymously as Topol
- Edward Topol (born 1938), Russian writer
- Eric Topol (born 1954), American cardiologist
- Filip Topol (1965–2013), Czech singer and songwriter
- Jáchym Topol (born 1962), Czech poet
- Josef Topol (1935–2015), Czech playwright
- Sergei Topol (born 1985), Russian ice hockey player
- Sidney Topol (1924–2022), American innovator and entrepreneur
