= Leonard Tow =

American businessman and philanthropist (1928–2025)

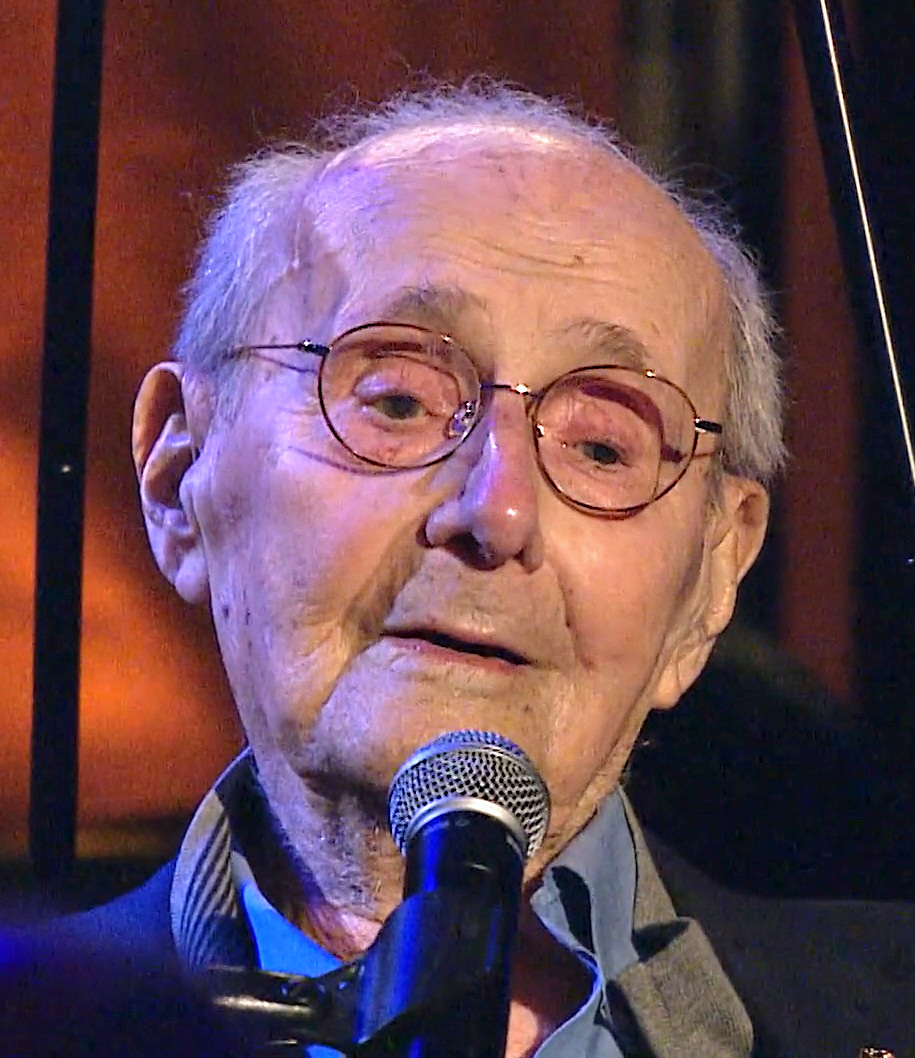
- Tow in 2024
- Born: May 30, 1928; New York City, U.S.
- Died: August 10, 2025 (aged 97); New Canaan, Connecticut, U.S.
- Education: Brooklyn College (BA); Columbia University (PhD)
- Occupations: businessman, philanthropist
- Known for: CEO and Chairman of Citizens Communications
- Spouse: Claire Schneider (m. 1952; died 2014)
- Children: 3
- Awards: Carnegie Medal of Philanthropy (2019)

Leonard Tow (May 30, 1928 – August 10, 2025) was an American businessman and philanthropist. He was the chairman and CEO of Citizens Communications (now Frontier Communications) and chairman of Electric Lightwave. He also co-founded Century Communications, which was sold to Adelphia Communications Corporation for $5.2 billion in 1999 and became part of Cablevision.

== Background ==
Tow was born in Brooklyn on May 30, 1928, the son of Jewish immigrants from Russia. He received his B.A. from Brooklyn College and Ph.D. from Columbia University in economic geography.

== Career ==
Tow began his career as an instructor at Columbia Business School before leaving for the private sector. Tow worked for Touche Ross & Company and then became an assistant to Irving B. Kahn and eventually becoming SVP of TelePrompTer Corporation. He left TelePrompTer to found his own telecommunications company, Century Communications, which grew to become the nation’s fifth-largest cable television company at the time of its sale in 1999. He was also elected as chairman and CEO of Citizens Communications, serving in those positions from 1989 to 2004 and was a director of Adelphia Communications Corporation.

Having retired from the cable industry, Tow began to focus on philanthropic activities through the Tow Foundation, which was founded in 1988. The foundation focuses on improving medical care and research, helping disadvantaged youths and reforming the juvenile justice system, as well as funding cultural institutions and the performing arts programs at higher education institutions in the tri-state New York Metropolitan area. Tow took a particular interest in the arts and was an avid theatergoer: his daughter, Emily, said that "Some weeks he'd see three or four plays, from a basement in the Lower East Side to the fanciest Broadway production", and continued attending plays until the final weeks of his life.

Tow supported higher education institutions such as Bard College, Barnard College, Brooklyn College, Columbia University, City University of New York, John Jay College of Criminal Justice, University at Buffalo, University of New Haven, and Wesleyan University, as well as medical institutions such as Memorial Sloan Kettering Cancer Center, Hospital for Special Surgery, and the New York Genome Center.

In 2012, Tow and his wife signed The Giving Pledge, a public commitment to give away 50% of their wealth or more during their lifetimes or upon their death. Tow was a longtime member of the Forbes 400.

Tow was a recipient of the Carnegie Medal of Philanthropy in 2019.

== Personal life and death ==
In 1952, Tow married Claire Schneider (1929–2014), whom he met in college, and was a co-founder of Century Communications. She died in 2014 from Lou Gehrig's disease. The couple had three children. Their son, Andrew, is the owner of The Withers, a winery based in Sonoma County, California. Their daughter, Emily Tow Jackson, is the President of the Tow Foundation and has served as a trustee of Barnard College, from which she graduated in 1988.

Tow died at his home in New Canaan, Connecticut, on August 10, 2025, at the age of 97.
