= Topal (surname) =

- Pronunciation: Turkish: [ˈtopaɫ]

Origin
- Origin: Turkish

Other names
- Variant form: Topaloğlu (English: son of Topal)

Topal is a Turkish word meaning "lame" and may refer to:

== Surnames of contemporary people ==
- Hakan Topal (born 1972), Turkish-American artist
- Mehmet Topal (born 1986), Turkish football player
- Mehmet Can Topal, Turkish judoka with Down syndrome
- Murat Topal (born 1976), Turkish-Austrian futsal player
- Stepan Topal (1938–2018), Gagauz politician from Moldova who served as Governor of Gagauzia from 1990 to 1995
- Turan Topal, Turkish Christian convert, who went on trial in 2006 for crimes against "Turkishness" and Islam

== Epithets of historical Ottoman people ==
- Topal Osman Agha, a colonel of the late Ottoman Empire and early Republic of Turkey
- Darendeli Topal İzzet Mehmed Pasha, a Grand Vizier and Kapudan Pasha of the Ottoman Empire
- Topal Osman Pasha, a Grand Vizier in the Ottoman Empire
- Topal Recep Pasha, a Grand Vizier in the Ottoman Empire
- Topal Sulayman Pasha, an Ottoman ruler of Damascus
- Topal Yusuf Pasha, an Ottoman ruler of Damascus

== Epithets of historical Bosnian rulers ==
- Topal Hasan-paša, a ruler of Bosnia
- Gazi Topal Husein-paša, a ruler of Bosnia
- Šerif Topal Osman-paša, a ruler of Bosnia

== See also ==
- Topol (surname), a Polish/Russian/Jewish surname of different lineage than those of Turkish origin
