= Luther Simjian =

American-Armenian inventor

Luther George Simjian
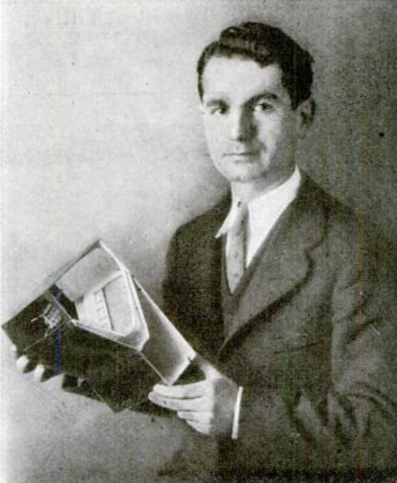
- Simjian holding his self-photographing camera in 1929
- Born: January 28, 1905; Aintab, Ottoman Empire (now Gaziantep, Turkey)
- Died: October 23, 1997 (aged 92); Fort Lauderdale, Florida, U.S.
- Citizenship: United States
- Occupations: Professional inventor; entrepreneur

Luther George Simjian (January 28, 1905 – October 23, 1997) was an Armenian-American inventor and entrepreneur. A prolific and professional inventor, he held over 200 patents, mostly related to optics and electronics. His most significant inventions were a pioneering flight simulator, arguably the first ATM and improvement to the teleprompter.

== Early life ==
Simjian was born in Aintab, Ottoman Empire to Armenian parents on January 28, 1905. (Note: "An obituary on Sunday about Luther G. Simjian [...] referred imprecisely to his nationality. While he was born in Turkey, he was of Armenian descent.") His father, George, was an insurance broker working for an Austrian company. His mother, Josephine (née Zaharian) died when he was only a few months old. His father later remarried and he had two half-sisters. Simjian lived in Aintab until the age of nine. In 1915, during the Armenian genocide, the Simjian family fled to Aleppo, Syria, only to return to Aintab in 1920. His stepmother and half-sisters were killed in Marash. Simjian fled to Beirut, then to France and eventually to the United States by the end of 1920. He first settled in New Haven, Connecticut, living with an uncle. He found a job coloring photographs. He graduated from the Booth Preparatory School in New Haven.

== Yale and early inventions ==
Simjian began working as a technician at the Yale School of Medicine in a work-study position at the photography lab. While initially having been inclined to pursue medical education, he eventually decided to pursue photography. In his position of a medical photographer, Simjian "took pictures of specimens, made lantern slides for doctors, and showed the slides for class lectures." In 1928 Simjian founded and became the first director of the photography department at the Yale School of Medicine, which he headed until 1934. After resigning from Yale, he moved to New York City and took courses at Columbia University "that he felt would be useful in the promotion of his inventions, focusing on business education, writing, and international banking."

=== Self-photographing and self-focusing camera ===
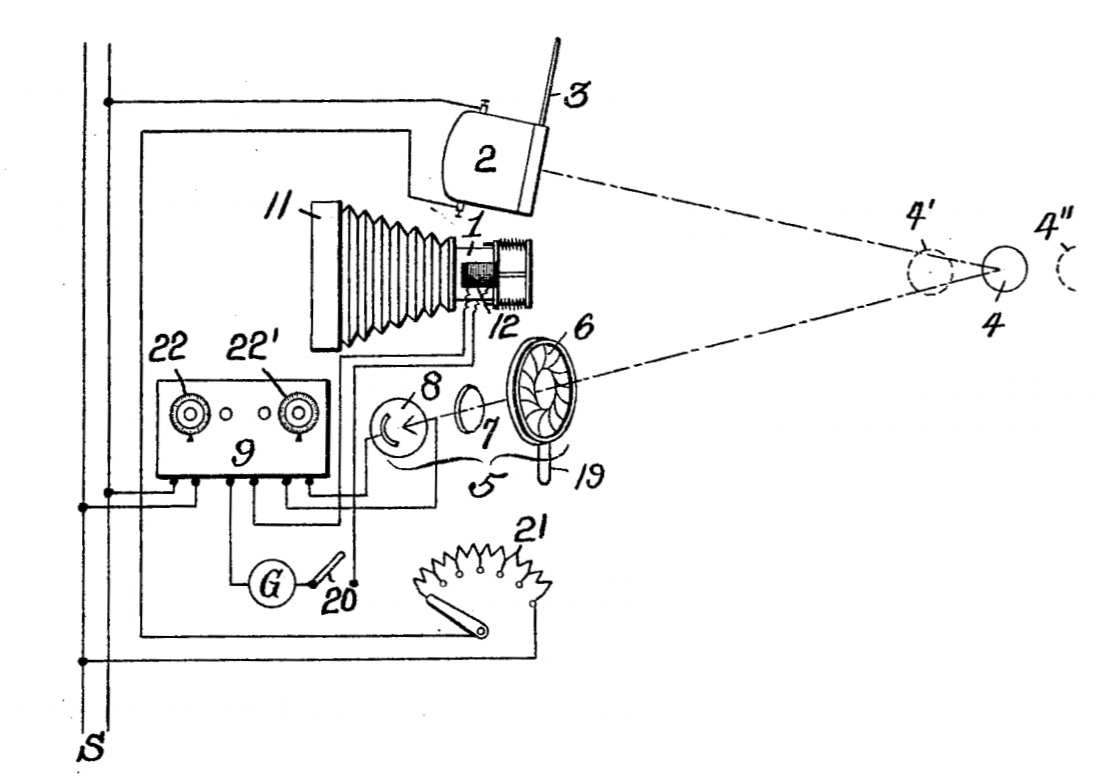
Simjian's "Self-focusing camera" (1931)

Simjian's interest in portrait photography led to him inventing a self-photographing camera (PhotoReflex). He was inspired to invent it from his unhappiness with the repetitive nature of yearbook portraits. In 1929 he applied for patent for the "Pose-reflecting system for photographic apparatus." It was covered early on by the Popular Science magazine in 1929. It allowed the "subject to look into a mirror and see the framed pose the camera would take." To manufacture the new product, Simjian collaborated with Sperry Gyroscope to set up PhotoReflex, a company named after the camera itself. In 1931 the camera was introduced at the Wanamaker's department store in New York City contained within a portrait cabinet. Within the booth, people could see the "reflexive production of images of the self in real time." It was widely covered in the press at the time.

The self-photographing camera led to the invention of the autofocus (self-focusing) camera by Simjian. He applied for patent in June 1931 and was granted one for the "Self-focusing camera" in July 1932. It "changed the whole photography industry," but he did not "receive much money for his autofocusing invention, but he did get publicity. He eventually sold the rights to the PhotoReflex camera and name but reserved the rights to use the technology for non-photographic applications."

=== Color X-ray ===
In June 1934 he was granted a patent for a color X-ray machine. He had applied for it in March 1932. He had "conceived the idea at Yale while trying to improve the quality of lecture slides. He decided to apply the new technology of television to X-ray images. Scanning was done in three separate colors, each of which could be enhanced as necessary, and the three scans could then be recombined to form a colored image. The separate scans could also be sent through a wire to another location for analysis. This transformed the field of X-ray technology." This was reported by Time Magazine and The Literary Digest in July 1934.

Simjian thereafter traveled to Europe and established a laboratory in London and Miroflex, a company to produce the PhotoReflex camera. However, his plans were disrupted by World War II as the focus of production shifted from commercial to military.

== Reflectone and flight simulator ==
In 1939 Simjian founded Reflectone Corporation (later renamed to Reflectone Electronics, Inc.) in Stamford, Connecticut, to develop and manufacture his inventions. He served as president and chairman of Reflectone until he sold the company to Universal Match Corporation in 1961. Under his leadership, the company achieved "significant commercial success."

One of the first inventions in Reflectone was a rotating chair with a movable mirror to be used for women when applying cosmetics. "The user could sit in front of a vanity mirror, rotate on this chair and continue to see the back of her head while keeping both hands free." The chair was marketed as Reflectone Mirror Chair and was a "small commercial success." Also during his time at Reflectone, Simjian invented a method to develop a photo "immediately while still preserving the negative."

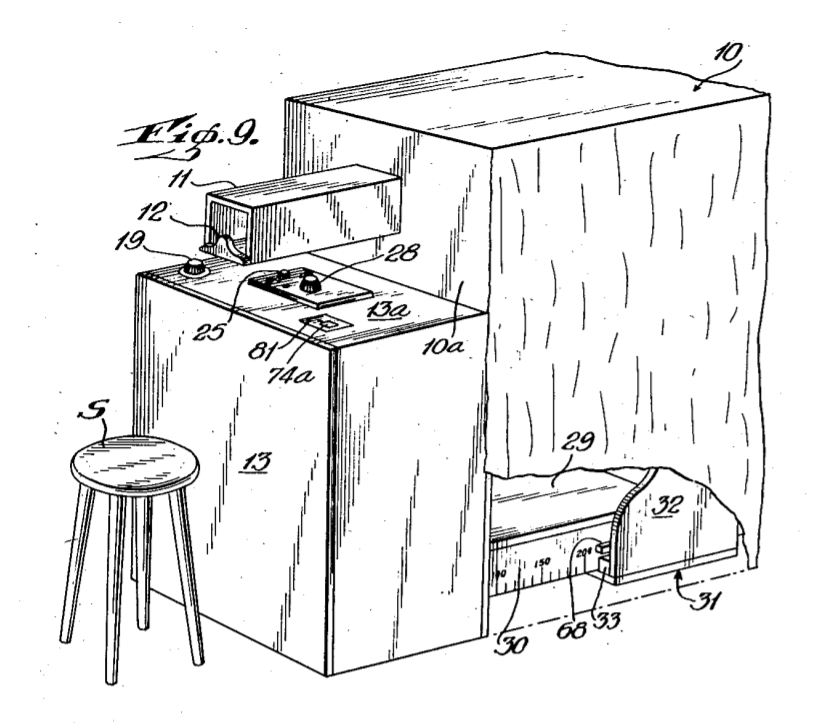
Simjian's "Training apparatus" (1943)

During World War II, Simjian invented a training apparatus for aviators. It was the "first flight simulator of its kind." He filed for patent in February 1943 and was granted a patent for it in January 1946. It was a "mechanism used for training aviators in identifying aircraft or ships, in determining the speed of movement of aircraft, direction of movement, and other related factors that are important in combat flying." "He designed the three-dimensional device using synchronized mirrors similar to those on his PhotoReflex camera and mirror chair, an airplane model, and controlled lighting. By remotely changing the speed and angles of the model plane while the pilot or gunner watched through a sight, the instructor could produce the effect of flight, thus training the student to identify an enemy aircraft and judge its motion."

During the war, Reflectone sold over 2,000 of these devices to the U.S. military. The company grew exponentially to manufacture the orders for this trainer with the number of employees rising from three to over 100 and to 250 by 1950. The War Department credited the device "with having contributed to the success of the air war." Simjian considered it his "most significant invention of the era because of the many lives it saved." He received a citation from Admiral Bill Halsey saying his device had saved thousands American servicemen's lives.

Reflectone moved its operations to Tampa, Florida, in 1980 and was sold to BAE Systems (British Aerospace) for $90 million in 1997, and renamed BAE Systems Flight Simulation and Training. As of 1997 the company still made "full-flight simulators for commercial and military aircraft." In 2001 BAE Systems sold the subsidiary to CAE Inc. (Canadian Aviation Electronics) for $80 million.

== Later inventions ==
After Reflectone, Simjian founded General Research Inc. and Command Automation Inc., the latter was a research and development lab in Fort Lauderdale, Florida. His later inventions were increasingly diverse and eclectic. He noted: "One thing I discovered about myself in the early days of my life is that I can't stick with just one idea for too long." Between 1956 and 1963, he received some 75 patents, making it his most prolific period.

=== Teleprompter ===
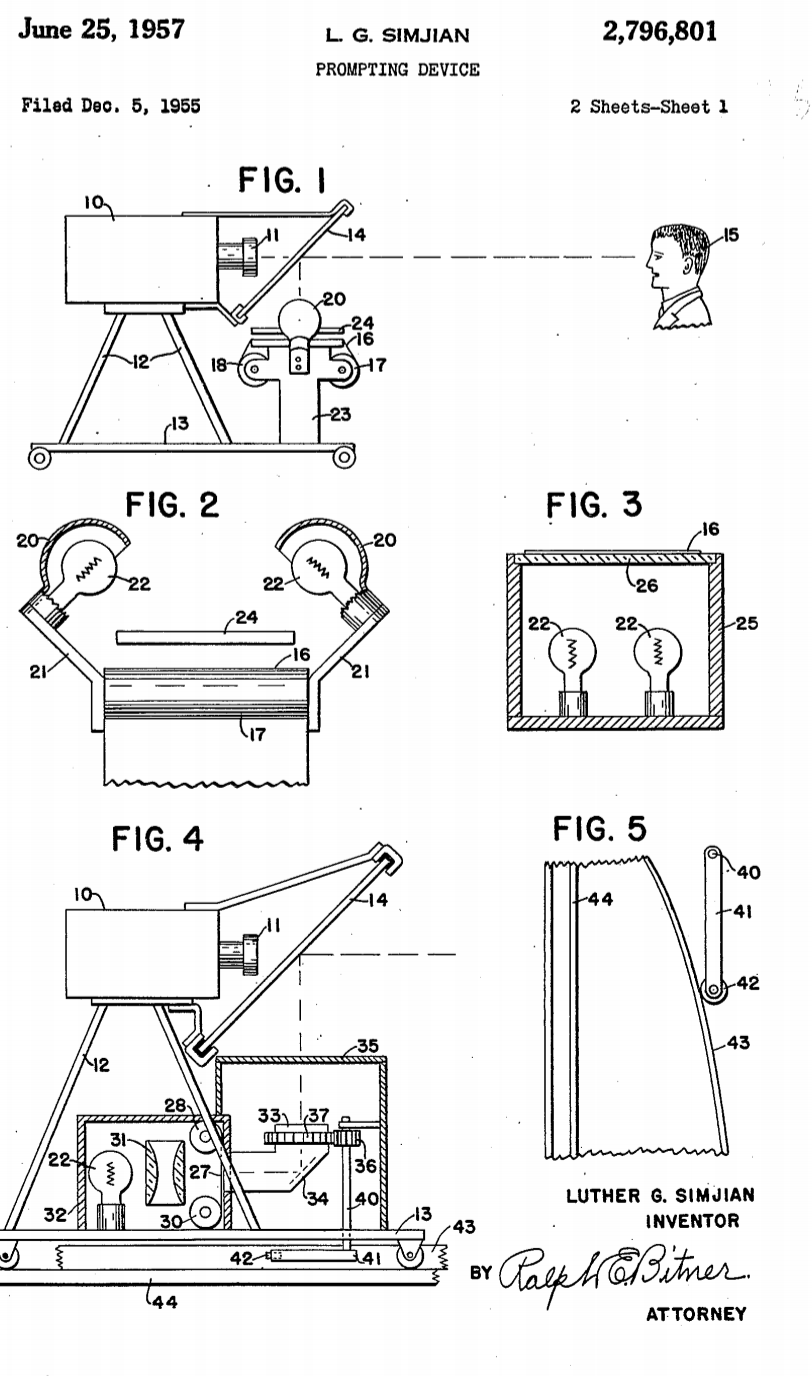
Simjian's "Prompting device" (1955)

Simjian held a patent on the teleprompter. However, he is not its sole inventor. Its invention is usually credited to Hubert Schlafly, an engineer working with CBS and Fred Barton, an actor, who developed a mechanical cueing device in the 1950s. Simjian and Jess Oppenheimer, the creator and producer of the classic sitcom I Love Lucy, improved it and replaced it with an optical teleprompter. Hayward wrote that the advantage of the optical teleprompter proposed by Simjian and Oppenheimer was "its ability to break down the division between the viewer and person on camera by allowing for direct eye contact on the part of the presenter with the camera aperture." The prompting device was applied for patent in 1955 and it was granted in 1957. Hayward argues that:

In this way, Simjian's contribution must be interpreted as more than simply a contribution to the technological infrastructure of television, but a material shift in those techniques which structure norms about how to present oneself while on screen as natural and comfortable before physically absent audiences.

=== Bankograph (ATM) ===
Simjian invented what has been described as a precursor of the automated teller machine (ATM). For this, Simjian is often considered the inventor of the ATM (Note: According to Bátiz-Lazo and Reid, it is James Goodfellow who holds the "first and perhaps most compelling claim to the original innovation," which was filed in 1966. It was Goodfellow's invention that "clearly had a profound influence on the industry as a whole.") or that he first introduced the concept. The entry on Simjian in the American National Biography noted that he is "sometimes referred to as the 'father of the ATM' because he introduced the idea behind these now-ubiquitous machines." According to history.com, "Many experts believe that the first automated banking machine was the creation" of Simjian. According to Konheim, Simjian "came up with the idea of creating a 'hole-in-the wall machine' that would allow customers to make financial transactions." Hayward notes that Simjian's role in the invention of the ATM is disputed, however, he is recognized as the "inventor of a photomechanical automated banking terminal," popularly known as the Bankograph.

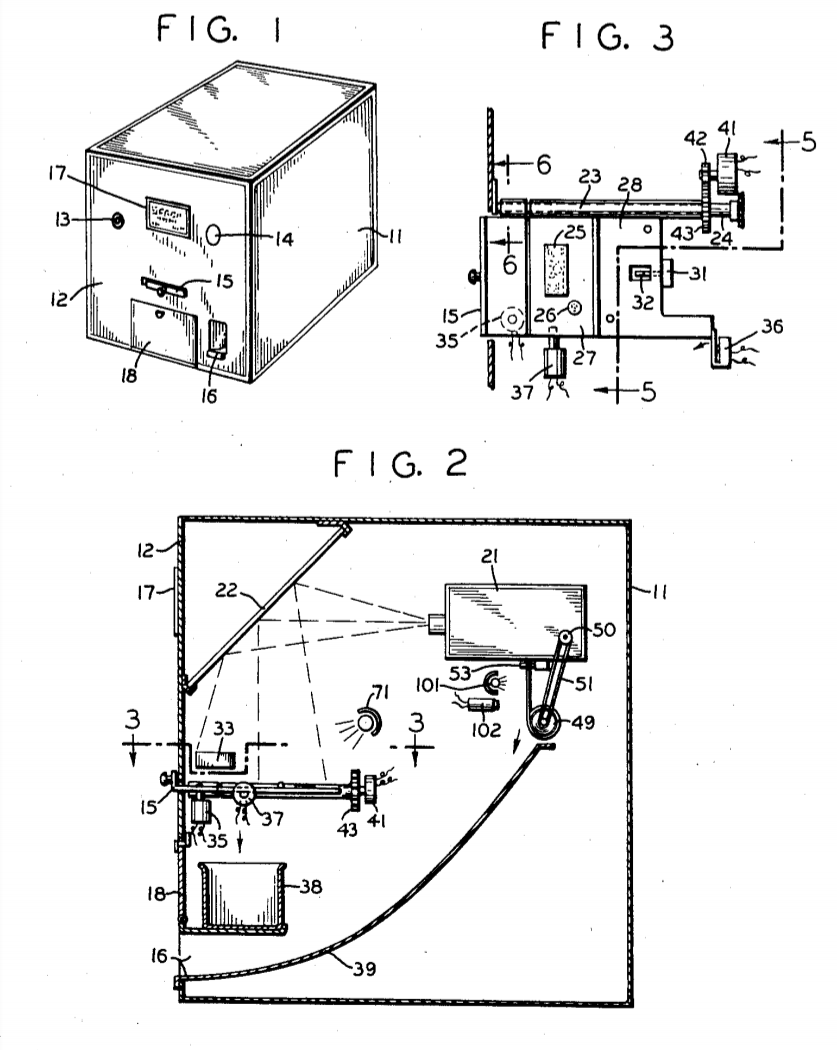
Simjian's "Subscriber controlled apparatus" (1959)

Simjian was granted over 20 patents for the Bankograph. His "Apparatus for collecting an article for deposit" (filed in 1958) was granted in late March 1960. It was covered by the New York Times, which described it as a "robot bank teller that gives the depositor a picture of the money he puts in. There can never be any question as to the number and bills to be credited to his account." Simjian filed for a patent for "Subscriber controlled apparatus" in 1959. In 1960 Simjian filed for patent a device that incorporated an ATM photographing the deposited check.

Described as "less than a full-function ATM," the Bankograph was an automatic deposit machine that accepted cash and check deposits at all times. A camera inside the machine took snapshots of the deposits, copies of which were given to the customers as receipts. He introduced it to the wider public in 1961, when it was placed in a few City Bank of New York bank lobbies for six months. The company discontinued its use due to limited appeal. Simjian wrote in his autobiography: "It seems the only people who were using the machines were a small number of prostitutes and gamblers who didn't want to deal with tellers face to face. And the bank said there were not enough of them to make the deal lucrative." Hayward argues that the Bankograph was ultimately a failure "because of its evasion of established norms of visuality associated with banking at the time." Konheim described it as "perhaps the first ATM" and "an early and not-very-successful prototype of an ATM." The New York Times wrote in 1998 that it was his most famous invention and "the basis for the now-ubiquitous A.T.M., from which he never made a penny."

The authors of a 2009 study in the journal Marketing Science credited Simjian with the first concept (1957), the first patent (1957), and the first prototype (1960) of the ATM, which they listed as a radical innovation, but credited De La Rue Instruments with mico-commercialization, the first sale of an innovation (1967), and Docutel with macro-commercialization, the first year a firm sells the innovation to a broad market (1969).

=== Other ===
Simjian's other inventions included an indoor computerized golf practice range (1960s), an exercise bicycle that massages the rider (1973), a golf training aid to improve putting (1981), a remotely accessed automatic postage meter (1981) that was purchased by Pitney Bowes, a meat tenderizing method, golf balls, cooking devices, the use of ultrasound as an anticounterfeiting device, an athletic shoe, and a bandage. He also revisited and improved some of his earlier inventions. His eyesight declined significantly in his last years. However, he still made inventions with his last patent being granted several months before his death, in March 1997.

== Personal life and death ==
Simjian spoke Arabic and French, and English with a "thick accent". His interests included golf, backgammon, Mark Twain's works, porcelains, and Middle Eastern food.

Simjian became a naturalized U.S. citizen in 1929, nine years after his arrival.

He married Gladys (née Cannon) in April 1936. They had met at a party in New York's Greenwich Village in 1935. They had two children: Maryjo Garre and Ronald Simjian.

Simjian died aged 92 on October 23, 1997, at his beachfront apartment in Fort Lauderdale, Florida.

== Legacy and recognition ==
The American National Biography describes him as a "pioneer in photographic and optical inventions."

Simjian avoided publicity and never became a public figure. He was "so private few people would recognize his name," wrote Ardy Friedberg in the Sun-Sentinel in 1997. Simjian self-published Portions of an Autobiography in 1997 just before his death. During his seven-decade long career as a professional inventor, Simjian received over 200 American and foreign patents. After his death, he was compared to Thomas Edison. Times Union wrote on his death: "Simjian was Jeffersonian, Edisonian, da Vincian — take your pick. His motley inventions enriched life and gave jobs to untold thousands."

Friedberg described his life as "a bona fide American success story". His long-time patent agent, Ervin Steinberg, noted that Simjian was "one of the most prolific inventors of [the 20th] century." Hayward argued that his "career as an inventor highlights the extent to which the optical retains significance in the contemporary era."

=== Awards ===
- The Award of Appreciation from the State of Florida, 1961
- In June 1963 the Science Digest magazine named Simjian Inventor of the Month.
- In 1978 Simjian received the Eli Whitney Award by the Connecticut Patent Law Association (currently the Connecticut Intellectual Property Law Association, CIPLA) "in recognition of significant contribution to law or science."
- In 2019 Simjian was inducted into the Florida Inventors Hall of Fame. His "numerous inventions [...] have advanced technology throughout Florida theme parks." For that occasion, he was named by Rep. Gus Bilirakis (R-FL) on House floor on July 24, 2019.
