= Topaloğlu =

Topaloğlu is a Turkish surname, meaning son (-oğlu) of Topal. Notable people with the surname include:

- Ali Topaloğlu (born 1998), Turkish track and field athlete
- Caner Topaloğlu (born 1985), Turkish basketball player
- Perihan Topaloğlu (born 1987), Turkish female handball player
- Yeliz Topaloğlu (born 1978), Turkish female football referee
- Cihan Topaloğlu (born 1992), Turkish footballer
