= Sidney Topol =

American innovator and entrepreneur (1924–2022)

- Born: December 28, 1924; Boston, Massachusetts, U.S.
- Died: March 30, 2022 (aged 97); Longboat Key, Florida, U.S.
- Education: University of Massachusetts
- Occupations: Chairman and CEO of Scientific Atlanta

Sidney Topol (December 28, 1924 – March 30, 2022) was an American innovator and entrepreneur. He was a contributor to several key developments in the telecommunications industries in the latter half of the twentieth century. He was a graduate of the University of Massachusetts Amherst (1947) and an engineer and executive at Raytheon and later Scientific Atlanta. Topol's expertise in microwave systems led to the development of the first effective portable television relay links, allowing broadcasts from even remote areas.

His foray into satellite technologies in the 1960s provided the foundation for building the emerging cable television industry, permitting the transmission of transoceanic television broadcasts. Topol also played a pivotal role in the development of international telecommunications trade policies and the promotion of high-definition television (HDTV), a technology that enhances video images by using digital, instead of analog, encoding techniques. After retiring in the early 1990s, Topol continued to engage in philanthropic work, contributing to the educational and cultural life in Boston and Atlanta.

== Early life and education ==
Topol was born in Boston, Massachusetts, on December 28, 1924, to Polish immigrant parents. He graduated from the Boston Latin School in 1941. In 1943, after two years as a student at the University of Massachusetts, he joined the Army Air Corps, where he was trained as a radar specialist. After the war, Topol completed an undergraduate degree in physics at the University of Massachusetts, trained briefly at the Naval Research Laboratory in Washington, D.C., and then enrolled in a master's program at the University of California, Berkeley.

== Career ==
Topol began his career at the Raytheon Company. In 1960, he became general manager of Selenia Telecommunications, a Raytheon joint venture in Rome. In 1965, he returned to the U.S. to head Raytheon's communications division. At Raytheon, Topol was involved in the development and installation of 100-foot (30 m) earth stations, which opened the traffic between cable and satellites, and allowed live overseas television coverage to be viewed in the United States.

In 1971, Topol became president of Scientific Atlanta, a small Georgia technology company. He served as its president from 1971 to 1983, CEO from 1975 to 1987, and chairman of the board from 1978 to 1990. During his tenure, the company grew in sales from $16 million to more than $600 million. With his background in physics and satellites, Topol led Scientific Atlanta, together with Hubert Schlafly of TelePrompTer, in the development of the first portable satellite receiver for cable television broadcast. The first public demonstration of the technology took place in 1973, when Speaker of the House Carl Albert was able to speak at a cable television convention in Anaheim, California, from his congressional office in Washington, D.C.

In 1987, while serving as director and chairman of the board of Scientific Atlanta, Topol became chairman of the Advanced Television Systems Committee of the Electronic Industries Association. As chairman, he became a champion of HDTV. Topol's confidence that HDTV would literally change the face of television placed him before Congress and in White House briefing sessions to testify on its behalf.

== Legacy ==
Topol was elected to the Cable Hall of Fame in 2001 for his significant contributions to the cable industry. As a visionary in the field of telecommunications, Topol not only realized that the future of TV was in satellite communications, but also predicted the ultimate merging of cable, Internet and personal computers.

After retiring from Scientific Atlanta in 1990, Topol maintained involvement in business projects and community organizations. Topol sat on the boards of WGBH-TV and Americans for Peace Now.

Sidney Topol's professional papers (Sidney Topol Papers) are housed at the W.E.B. Du Bois Library at the University of Massachusetts. They include letters, clippings, photographs, oral histories, and engineering notebooks.

He died on March 30, 2022, at the age of 97.
