= Brad Topol =

American computer scientist (born c.1971)

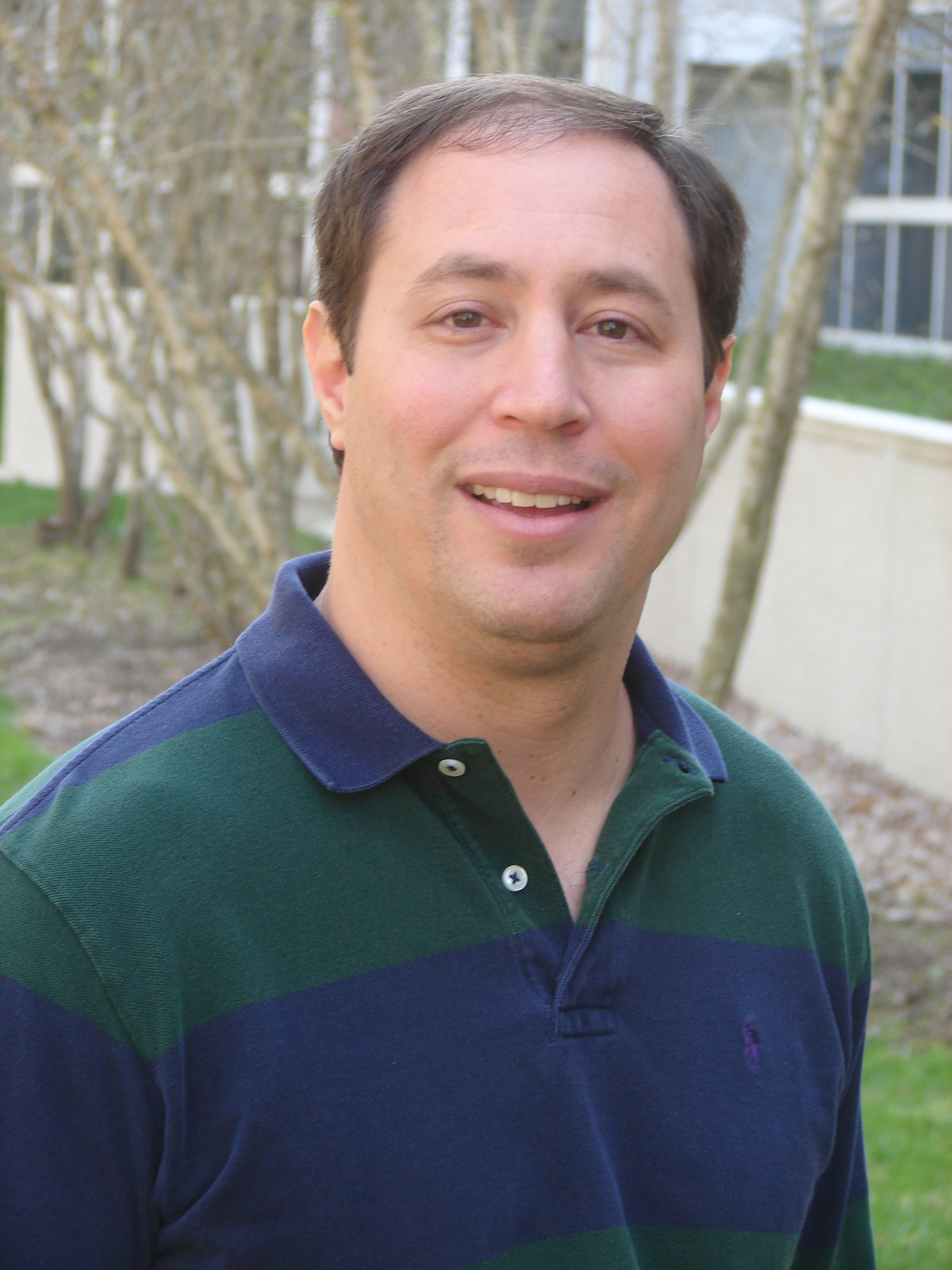
- Topol in 2011
- Born: c. 1971
- Education: BS/M.S in Mathematics/Computer Science; Ph.D in Computer Science
- Alma mater: Emory University; Georgia Institute of Technology
- Occupation: computer scientist

Brad B. Topol (born c. 1971) is a computer scientist best known as a former member of the OpenStack Foundation Board of Directors and is also an OpenStack core contributor to Keystone-Specs, Pycadf, and Heat-Translator, and a member of the OpenStack speaker bureau. Topol has a history of open-source software contributions, including Kubernetes.

== History ==
In 1993, Topol earned a dual BS/MS in Mathematics/Computer Science from Emory University. In 1998, he earned a PhD in Computer Science from Georgia Institute of Technology. Topol’s research focused on robust state sharing for wide-area distributed applications. Topol joined IBM and worked to create products from IBM Research innovations, such as transcoding technology. He later became an IBM Distinguished Engineering working on product serviceability.

== OpenStack and Kubernetes ==
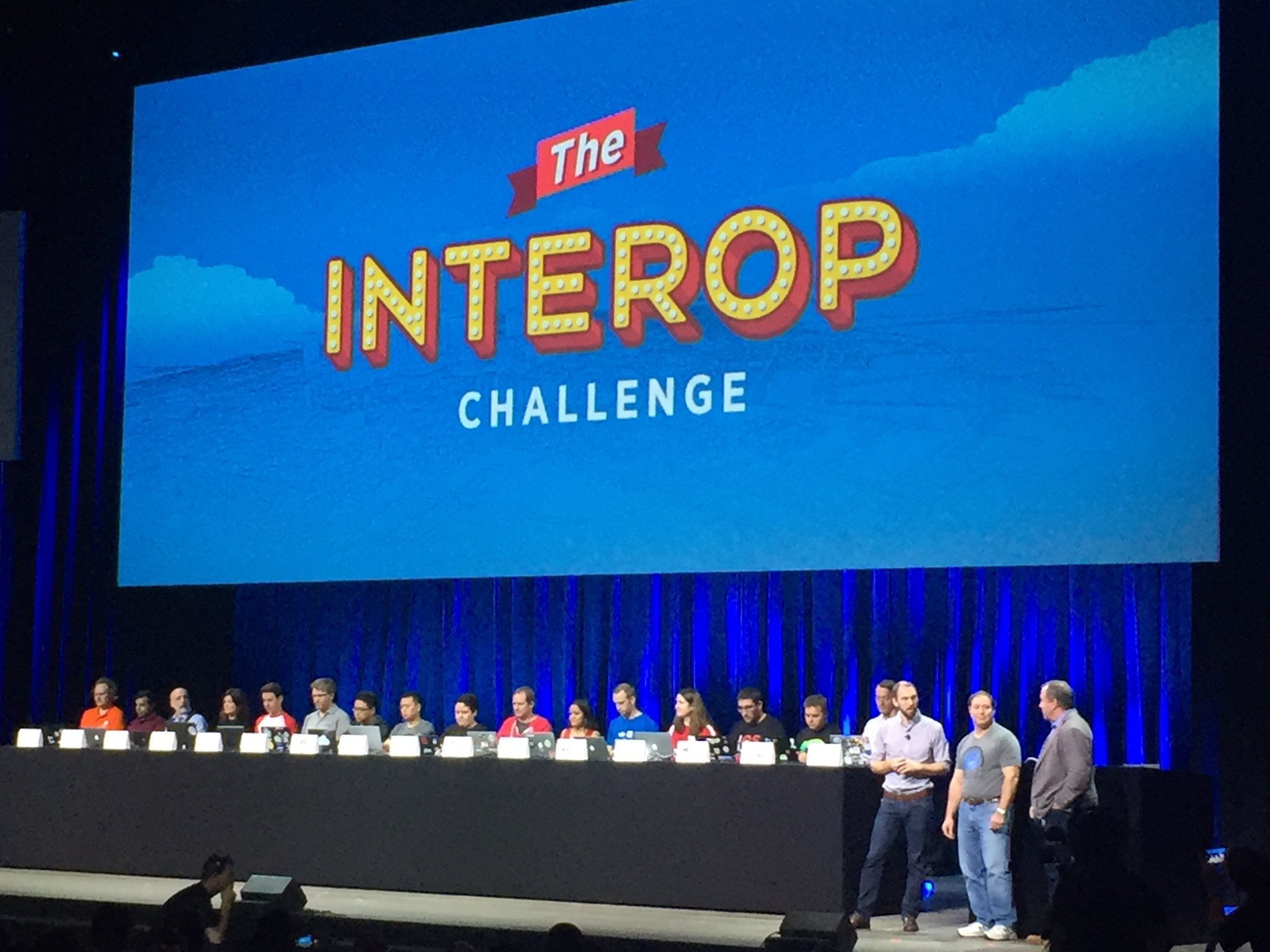
photo from the OpenStack Interop Challenge

Topol first gained eminence in the OpenStack community through his work on security. He is project lead for the OpenStack Interoperability Challenge effort. Topol is also a Kubernetes contributor and serves as a member of the Kubernetes Conformance Workgroup. He is a frequent keynoter and presenter at conferences.

== Mentoring ==
Topol is frequently interviewed about open-source software and community topics, especially for his advice on developing technical eminence. Topol has mentored others as they learn Git, Python and how to contribute to open source communities, and he advises, “Be a humble doer. Don't be arrogant, be someone who makes it real; be a doer, not a talker.”

== Publications ==
- Michael Elder, Jake Kitchener, and Brad Topol (2021) “Hybrid Cloud Apps with OpenShift and Kubernetes: Delivering Highly Available Applications and Services“, “O’Reilly Media”
- Michael Elder, Jake Kitchener, and Brad Topol (2019) “Kubernetes in the Enterprise“, “O’Reilly Media”
- Steve Martinelli, Henry Nash, and Brad Topol (2015) “Identity, Authentication, and Access Management in OpenStack: Implementing and Deploying Keystone”, “O’Reilly Media”
- Brad Topol, Mustaque Ahamad, John T. Stasko, “Robust State Sharing for Wide Area Distributed Applications”, Proceedings of the 18th International Conference on Distributed Computing Systems (ICDCS 98), pp. 554–561, "Georgia Tech"
- B. Topol, J. Stasko, and V. S. Sunderam (1998), “PVaniM: A Tool for Visualization in Network Computing Environments”, “Concurrency: Practice and Experience”, Vol. 10, No. 14, pp. 1197–1222.
- B. Topol, J. Stasko, and V. S. Sunderam (1997), “The Dual Timestamping Methodology for Visualizing Distributed Applications”, “Proc. Iasted Intl. Conference on Parallel and Distributed Systems”, Barcelona, Spain, pp. 81–86.
