= Feliks Topolski =

Polish-British artist (1907–1989)

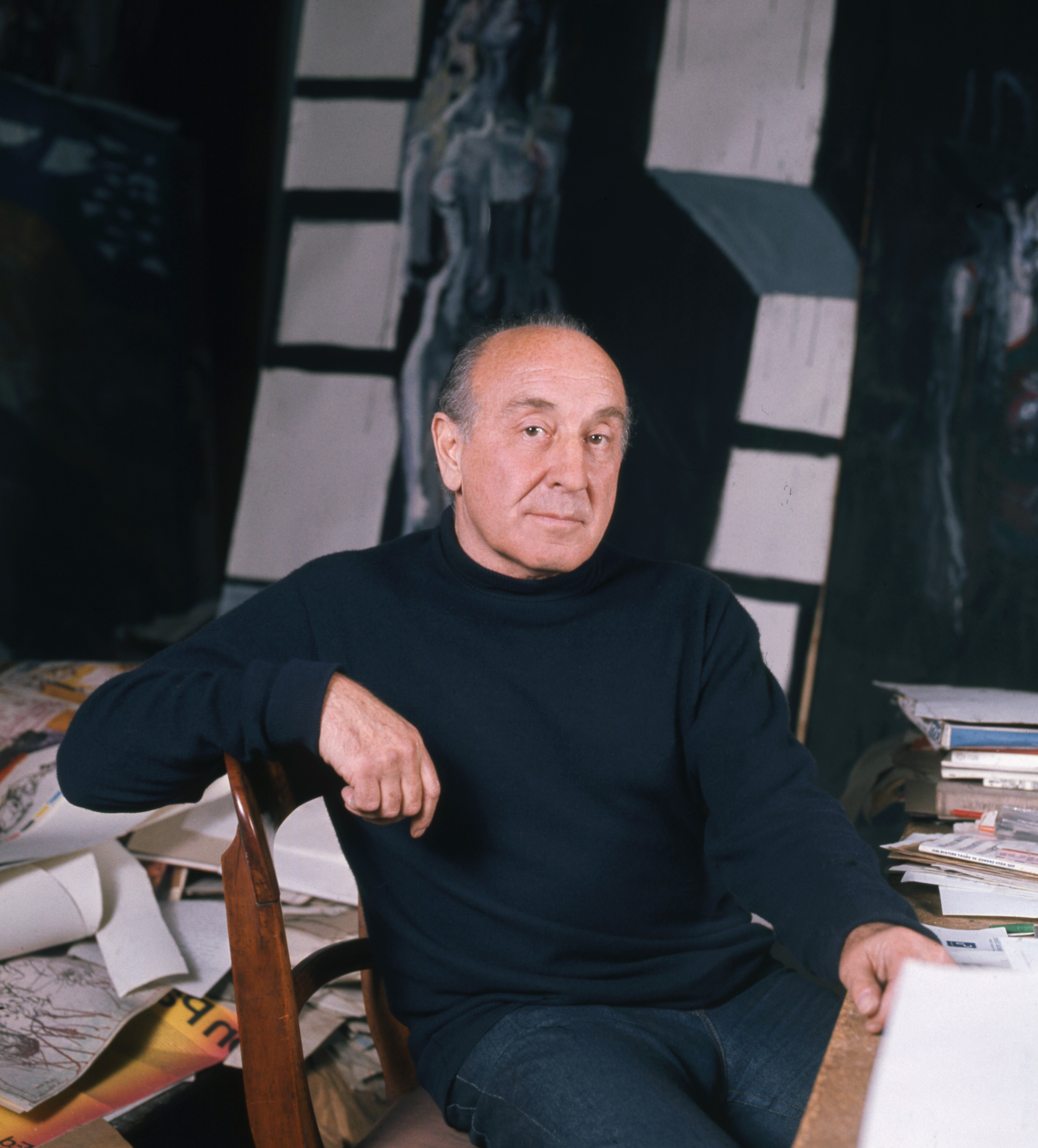
- Topolski photographed in 1973 by Allan Warren
- Born: 14 August 1907; Warsaw, Poland
- Died: 24 August 1989 (aged 82)
- Education: Academy of Fine Arts in Warsaw
- Known for: Painting

Feliks Topolski (14 August 1907 – 24 August 1989) was a Polish expressionist painter and draughtsman working primarily in the United Kingdom.

== Biography ==
Feliks Topolski was born on 14 August 1907 in Warsaw, Poland. He studied in the Academy of Fine Arts in Warsaw, and trained as an artillery officer. Later he studied and worked in Italy and France, and eventually he moved to Britain in 1935 after being commissioned to record King George V's silver jubilee. He opened a studio near Waterloo station, which later became an exhibition and then a café-bar featuring his art. He married twice, first to Marian Everall and then Caryl J. Stanley. In 1939 the George Bernard Shaw plays In Good King Charles's Golden Days and Geneva were published with illustrations by Topolski, bringing his work to a wider audience in the United Kingdom.

Topolski in his studio c. 1986 – snapshot by R. A. Redburn

Piccadilly Circus, 1973, Tate Gallery

During the Second World War, Topolski became an official war artist and painted scenes of the Battle of Britain and other battles. In 1941, he travelled to Russia alongside the men of 151 Wing RAF on board RMS Llanstephan Castle, which was sailing to the port Arkhangelsk as part of Operation Benedict, a mission to provide air support in defence of the port of Murmansk. He was travelling as an accredited War Artist for both Polish and British governments. He was also under contract to Picture Post magazine, which published many of his drawings after his return. At the Phillips & Powis – later Miles Aircraft – factory at Woodley Aerodrome near Reading, Berkshire, he produced a series of more than 40 sketches of wartime aircraft workers, including chief test pilot 'Tommy' Rose, and factory scenes, particularly the assembly line for the Miles Master.

After the war he made a celebrated painting about the first meeting of the United Nations. In 1947, he gained British citizenship. His work was also part of the painting event in the art competition at the 1948 Summer Olympics.

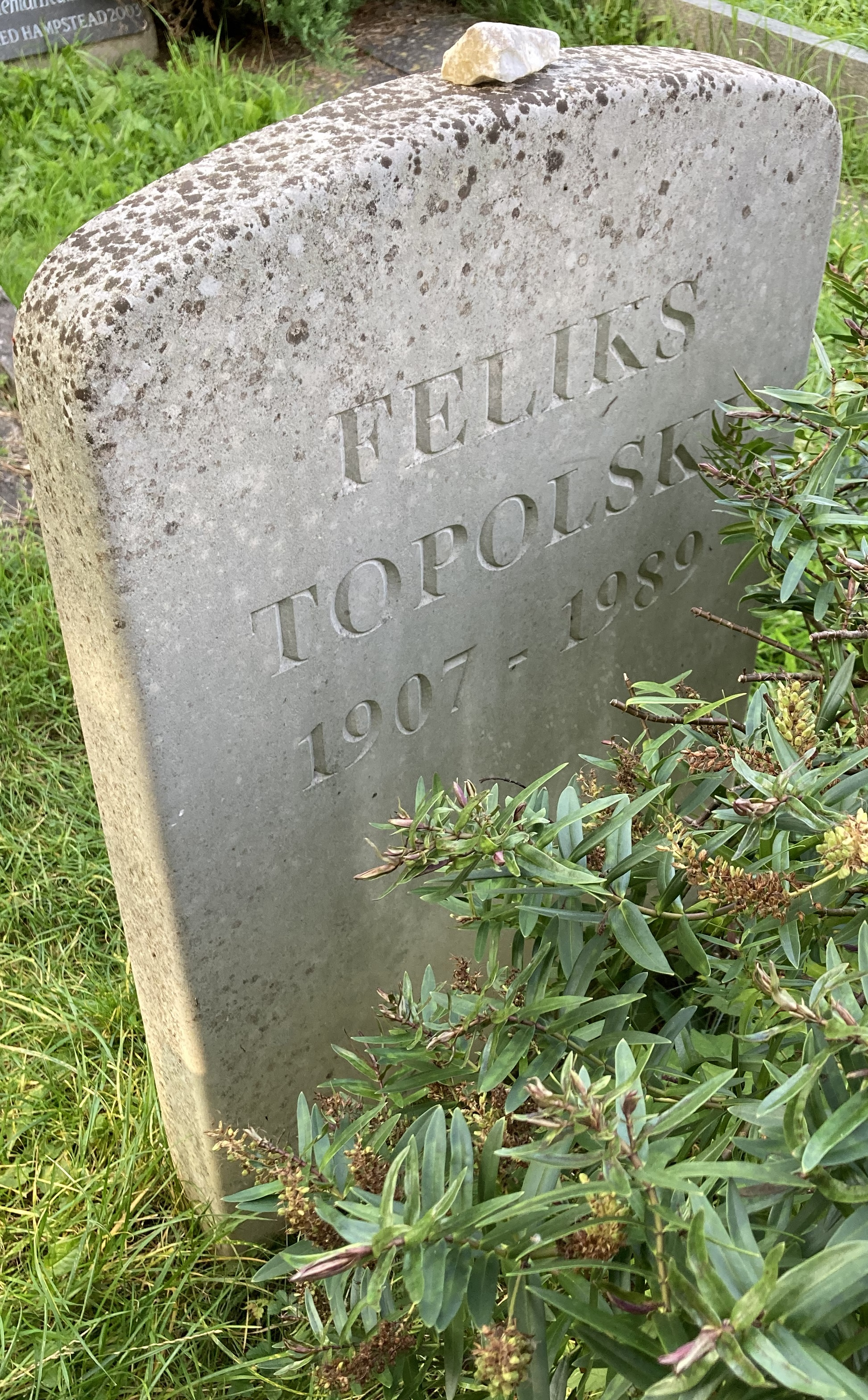
Grave of Feliks Topolski in Highgate Cemetery

Topolski's experiences were initially captured in pencil and ink drawings. These were the first stage of his prolific Chronicles, which appeared fortnightly from 1953 to 1979, interrupted only to accommodate his exploratory investigations across the globe. The Chronicles communicated his art and observations to a wider audience. They were independently published, without advertisements or subsidies. Since his death, Topolski's Chronicles have retained respect as a pictorial and political record spanning nearly 30 years of world history. The Chronicles contain 3,000 drawings, and were exhibited in New York City, Moscow, Cologne, Hamburg, Hawaii, Tel Aviv and serialised in the United States, Poland, Italy, Denmark and Switzerland. Joyce Cary wrote, it is "the most brilliant record we have of the contemporary scene as seized by a contemporary mind."

In 1951, Topolski was provided with a studio under one of the arches of Hungerford Bridge, where he worked consistently until his death in 1989. He was commissioned to produce a 60 feet (18 m) by 20 feet (6.1 m) mural under the arch over Belvedere Road for the Festival of Britain, unknowingly painting only two arches away from his eventual studio. Offered to him by David Eccles, the windows from the dismantled annex to Westminster Abbey were repurposed to fit Topolski's studio at the time of Queen Elizabeth II's coronation in 1953. Over the years the studio became a central feature of the South Bank, hosting countless people at his 'Open Studio' Fridays from 3 pm, with an open door to whomsoever wished to pop their head in. Now the Studio functions as an archive and exhibition space operated by Topolski Memoir, the charity set up to preserve the artist's legacy.

Topolski was provided with three further arches in 1975 by the Greater London Council, where he painted his epic 600 feet (180 m) long, 12–20 feet (3.7–6.1 m) high Memoir of the Century. Telling his broad-ranging experience of the 20th century, he painted the work from 1975 until his death, writing that he hoped to die working on it, with a brush in his hand. It remained open until 2006 in its original state, working with students but, due to its poor condition, underwent a £3,000,000 conservation and renovation program, funded by the Heritage Lottery Fund, private donations and several other grant bodies, and raised by the artist's son, Daniel Topolski. Reopened by the Duke of Edinburgh in 2009, the Memoir only ran for a year due to commercial pressures and was converted into the Topolski Bar and Café, where some of Topolski's work can still be seen.

In 1959, Prince Philip, Duke of Edinburgh, commissioned Topolski to create a mural depicting the coronation of Queen Elizabeth II. The mural contains 14 friezes divided into two narratives; one narrative, entitled In The Streets shows various processions to Westminster Abbey, while the second, entitled In The Abbey, depicts the procession out of the Abbey after the coronation.

Topolski painted portraits of contemporaries, including the authors H. G. Wells, Graham Greene, John Mortimer and Evelyn Waugh, and politicians Harold Macmillan and Aneurin Bevan, He also painted murals, contributed to BBC programmes, such as the caricatures of guests used in Face to Face and designed theatrical sets. Between 1975 and his death he worked on a 600 feet (180 m) mural in a studio in railway arches near London's South Bank, depicting events and people of the 20th century. It opened to the public as a free permanent exhibition called Topolski Century. In 2014 it was re-opened as the Topolski Bar and Café, featuring his art.

In 1989 he was elected a senior Royal Academician as a draughtsman.

Topolski died in London on 24 August 1989 at the age of 82. He is buried in Highgate Cemetery, north London.

He had a daughter, Theresa, and a son, Daniel, a rower who captained and coached Oxford in the Boat Race.

== Books illustrated ==
- Bernard Shaw, Geneva, London: Constable & Co. Ltd, 1939.
- Britain in Peace and War. London: Methuen, 1941.
- Bernard Shaw, Pygmalion, Harmondsworth: Penguin, 1941.
- Russia in War: London, summer 1941; Russia-bound convoy; a British cruiser; Iceland. London: Methuen, 1942.
- Jozef H. Retinger, Conrad and his contemporaries, New York: Roy Publishers, 1943.
- Three Continents, 1944–45: England, Mediterranean convoy, Egypt, East Africa, Palestine, Lebanon, Syria, Iraq, India, Burma front, China, Italian campaign, Germany defeated. London: Methuen, 1946.
- Face to Face, 1964.
- Richard J. Whalen, A City Destroying Itself: An Angry View of New York, New York: William Morrow and Co., 1965.
- Tony Palmer, The Trials of Oz London, Blond and Briggs, 1971.

== See also ==
- Topolski Century, mural artwork on South Bank, London, UK
