= Hubert Schlafly =

American television pioneer

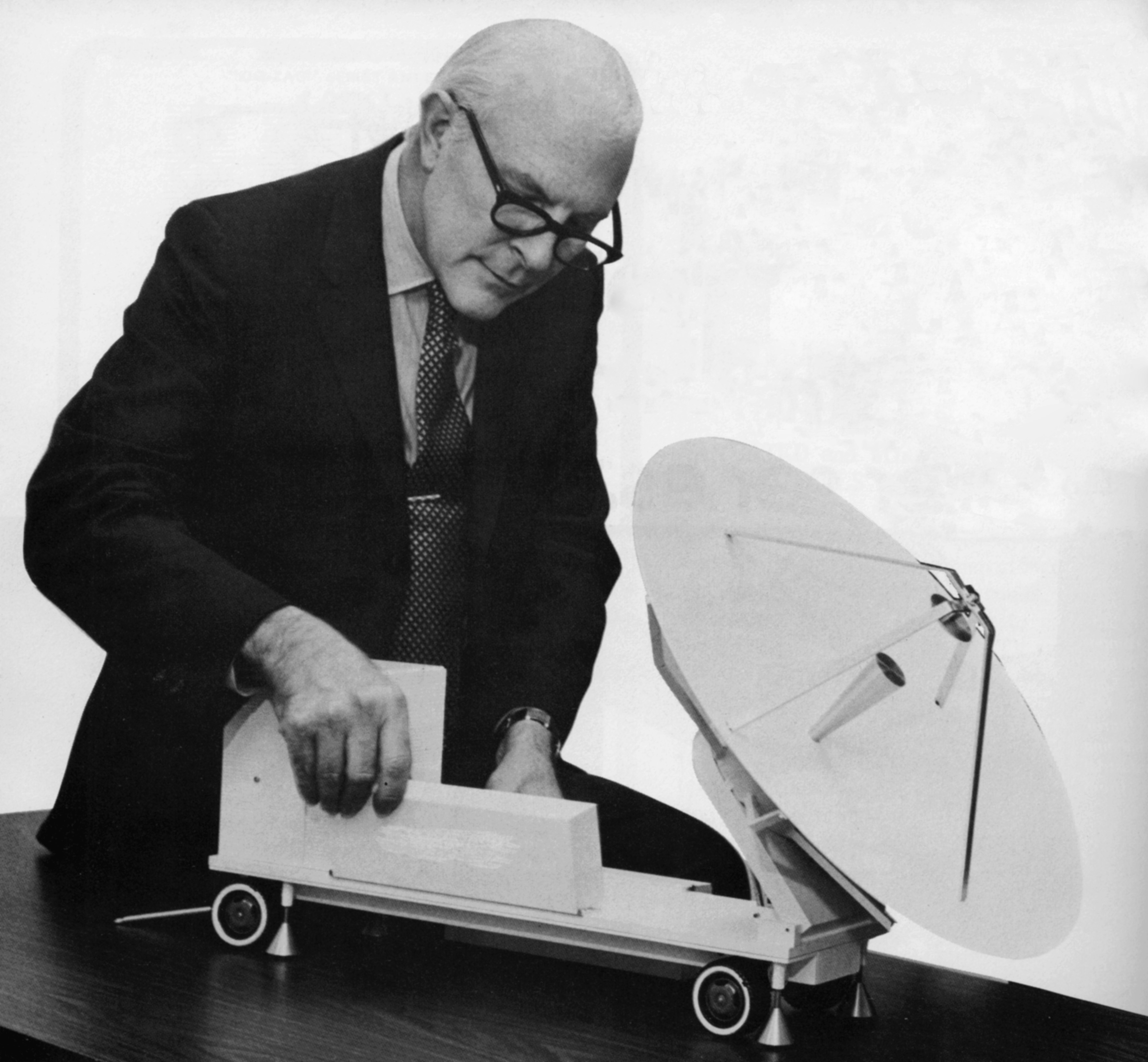
Schlafly with a model of the portable earth station he designed for the first satellite transmission of a cable television signal

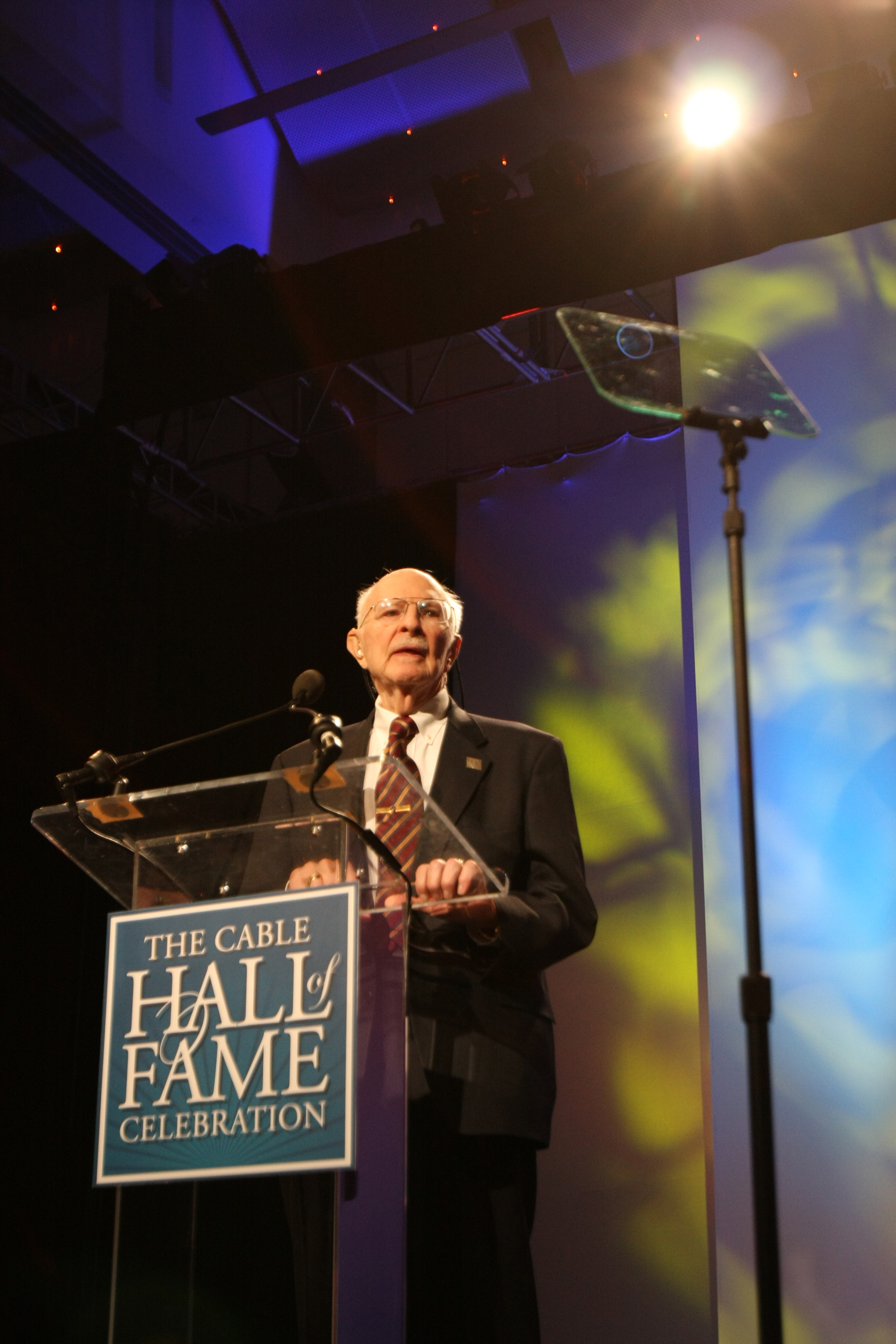
Schlafly using a teleprompter at Cable Hall of Fame induction

Hubert Joseph Schlafly Jr. (August 14, 1919 – April 20, 2011) was an American electrical engineer who co-invented the teleprompter. Schlafly is also credited with spearheading the movement towards satellite television within the industry.

Schlafly was born in St. Louis, Missouri, on August 14, 1919. He often moved as a child as his father moved around as a wildcatter. He graduated from St. Louis University High School and later earned a bachelor's degree in electrical engineering from the University of Notre Dame in 1941.

During the 1950s, Schlafly invented the teleprompter, which scrolls text to on-camera talent, in order to help a soap opera actor who could not remember their lines. Schlafly unveiled the teleprompter on the set of the CBS soap opera, The First Hundred Years, in 1950.

Schlafly and Irving B. Kahn also co-founded the TelePrompTer Corporation, which grew to become the largest cable television provider in the United States by 1973. They later sold the company to Westinghouse.

In addition to the teleprompter, Schlafly is also credited with helping to promote the broadcasting of television signals via a satellite feed. Schlafly and Sidney Topol, who worked for Scientific Atlanta, jointly constructed a portable satellite receiver to obtain satellite signals specifically for television. He first demonstrated the satellite television technology in 1973, when Speaker of the House Carl Albert was able to speak at a cable television convention in Anaheim, California, from his congressional office in Washington D.C. Schlafly later called the Albert speech via a satellite feed as his greatest contribution to the cable industry.

In a 1956 article in Amazing Stories Magazine he predicted for the turn of the century:

Systematic information storage will be in a form instantly available for response to remote inquiries. The refinements of solid state electronics will permit devices of considerable complication to be packaged in amazingly small volumes having low power requirements and exhibiting great resistance to mechanical damage. Communications, both personal and group communications will be highly refined without the encumbrance of any wires to or between terminal devices."

In 2008, Schlafly was inducted into the Cable Hall of Fame. His speech at the induction ceremony marked the first time that Schlafly used the teleprompter, which he had invented approximately fifty years before. Schlafly was also honored with two Emmy Awards for his contributions to cable television technology.

Schlafly died at a hospital in Stamford, Connecticut, on April 20, 2011, at the age of 91. His wife, Leona Martin Schlafly, predeceased him in 2003 after fifty-nine years of marriage.
