= Bar Topolski =

Bar and site of a mural by Feliks Topolski

Coordinates: 51.5048°N 0.1157°W

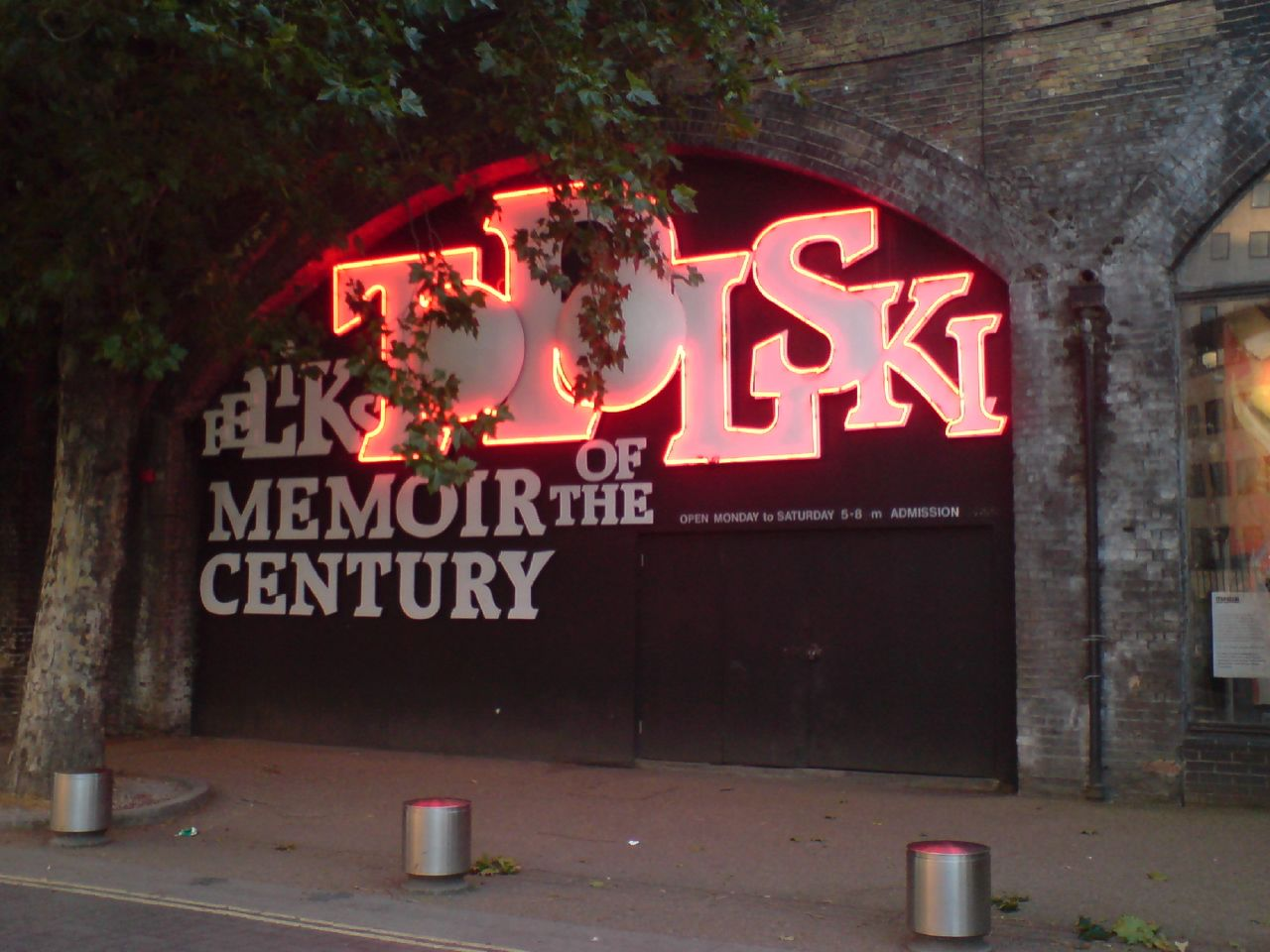
Topolski Century in 2006

Bar Topolski (previously known as the Topolski Century and Memoir of the 20th Century) is a bar and cafe in the Hungerford Bridge arches on the South Bank in London, England. Previously a gallery, it presented a large artwork by Feliks Topolski (1907–1989). In 2013, as a result of low visitor numbers and rising rents, the gallery became a bar, with some of the artwork remaining on display and the remainder being moved to a private studio.

The work was started in 1975 and opened by Prince Philip, Duke of Edinburgh in 1984. It presents a panoramic view of key events and people in the 20th century. This installation forms a mural that is 600 feet (180 m) long and 12–20 feet (4–6 m) high. The artist worked on the panels from 1975 until his death.
