= TelePrompTer Corporation =

1950-1981 American media company

- Industry: Television
- Predecessor: H & B American Corporation
- Founded: 1950; 76 years ago
- Founder: Irving B. Kahn; Fred Barton, Jr. Hubert Schlafly
- Defunct: 1981
- Fate: Merged into Westinghouse Broadcasting
- Successor: Westinghouse Broadcasting
- Subsidiaries: Filmation

TelePrompTer Corporation was an American media company that existed from approximately 1950 until 1981. The company was named for its eponymous primary product, a display device invented by Hubert Schlafly which scrolls text to people on video or giving speeches, replacing cue cards or scripts. Branded as the "TelePrompTer", the name has become a genericized trademark as "teleprompter".

== History ==
The company started around 1950 by businessman Irving B. Kahn; Fred Barton, Jr., a Broadway theatre actor; and Schlafly, an electrical engineer. Schlafly had invented the teleprompter in order to help a soap opera actor who could not remember his lines. He unveiled the device on the set of the CBS soap opera The First Hundred Years in 1950. Initially, public relations personnel handled the teleprompters.

TelePrompTer sold its eponymous business in the 1960s and invested in cable and satellite broadcast services. Schlafly went on to develop microwave video transmission services with Hughes Aircraft Company. Kahn was convicted in federal court in 1971 and imprisoned for 20 months for trying to bribe members of the Johnstown, Pennsylvania city council to award his company a local cable franchise. He was also convicted of perjury. Kahn had stepped down as chairman of TelePrompTer several months before his conviction. Kahn maintained, before and after his 20-month prison term, that the issue was extortion by the officials and not bribery by the company.

In 1969, TelePrompTer acquired the Filmation animation studio from its founders, Lou Scheimer, Hal Sutherland and Norm Prescott. Scheimer continued as an executive producer for the company until its dissolution.

TelePrompTer merged with H & B American Corporation in 1970, creating the nation's largest cable company at the time.

TelePrompTer grew to become the largest cable television provider in the United States by 1973. The company was later sold to Westinghouse, merging the cable operations into Westinghouse Broadcasting. After the merger, TelePrompTer's cable systems were renamed Group W Cable, with the broadcasting division renamed "Westinghouse Broadcasting and Cable". The Filmation studios were also part of the deal. Westinghouse sold its cable operations in 1986 to Houston Industries, which became Paragon Cable; 25% was sold to Comcast.

In 1989, Westinghouse sold Filmation to Paravision International, an investment consortium led by the French cosmetics company L'Oréal. Before that sale was complete, Westinghouse shuttered the film studio on February 3, 1989, which left L'Oréal with only the Filmation library.

Charter Communications owns and operates the cable systems previously run by TelePrompTer, with the exception of some owned and operated by Comcast.

== See also ==
- Teleprompter Corp. v. Columbia Broadcasting (1974)
- Loretto v. Teleprompter Manhattan CATV Corp. (1982)
