= Topol =

Topol may refer to:

== Missiles ==
- RT-2PM Topol, a Russian intercontinental ballistic missile in service from 1985
- RT-2PM2 Topol-M, a Russian intercontinental ballistic missile in service from 1997

== People ==
- Topol (surname)
- Chaim Topol (1935-2023), Israeli actor known mononymously as Topol

== Places ==
- Topol, Bloke, Slovenia, a settlement
- Topol pri Begunjah, Slovenia, a village formerly named simply Topol
- Topol pri Medvodah, Slovenia, a settlement formerly named Topol

== Other ==
- Topol Show, a Czech web talk show hosted by former Czech Prime Minister Mirek Topolánek

== See also ==
- Topal (disambiguation)
- Topo (disambiguation)
- Topola (disambiguation)
