= Topal, Astrakhan Oblast =

Topal Топал
- Settlement
- Location within Astrakhan Oblast Location within Russia
- Coordinates: 46°54′N 47°53′E
- Country: Russia
- Region: Astrakhan Oblast
- District: Krasnoyarsky District
- Time zone: UTC+4:00

Topal (Russian: Топал) is a rural locality (a settlement) in Akhtubinsky Selsoviet, Krasnoyarsky District, Astrakhan Oblast, Russia. The population was 456 as of 2010. The settlement has three streets.

== Geography ==
Topal is located on the Akhtuba River, 65 km northwest of Krasny Yar (the district's administrative centre) by road. Dosang is the nearest rural locality.
