= Mehmet Can Topal =

Turkish judoka

Mehmet Can Topal is a Turkish world silver medalist judoka with Down syndrome. He competes in the T21 disability category.
