= Irving B. Kahn =

American businessman (1917–1994)

Irving Berlin Kahn (September 30, 1917– January 22, 1994) was an American media proprietor. He was a founder of TelePrompTer Corporation and an early proponent and developer of cable television.

== Life and work ==
Irving Berlin Kahn was born in 1917 in Newark, New Jersey. He was the nephew of his namesake, popular composer Irving Berlin, and graduated from the University of Alabama, where he was a drum major.

Kahn's first job was as a public relations agent for Twentieth Century-Fox where he pioneered radio advertising for movies. After serving as a lieutenant in the United States Army Air Corps during World War II, he returned to his job and by 1950 was the vice president in charge of Fox's new radio and television subsidiary, TCF Television Productions, Inc.

With colleagues from Fox Radio, Fred Barton, Jr., a Broadway theatre actor, and Hubert Schlafly, an electrical engineer, he founded TelePrompTer Corporation which, in the 1950s, invented the teleprompter, which scrolls text to on-camera talent, in order to help a soap opera actor who could not remember his lines. Hubert Schlafly unveiled the teleprompter on the set of the CBS soap opera, The First Hundred Years, in 1950. PR men handled the teleprompters. Schlafly invented the idea of actors in soap operas reading their lines by prompters, not scripts as they had been.

TelePrompTer itself sold its eponymous business in the 1960s and invested in cable and satellite broadcast services.

Kahn was a visionary who had optimistically predicted in the 1960s that cable would provide 85 percent of all television reception by the end of the 1970s.

He was convicted in 1971 and federally imprisoned for 20 months for trying to bribe members of the Johnstown, Pennsylvania city council to award his company a local cable franchise. He was also convicted of perjury. Mr. Kahn had stepped down as chairman of TelePrompTer several months before his conviction. He maintained, before and after his 20-month prison term, that the issue was extortion by the officials and not bribery by Teleprompter.

In 1974, Kahn was involved in a case that went before the Supreme Court of the United States, regarding the application of search and seizure laws on wiretaps.

Soon after being released from federal prison, Kahn started a new cable television venture in 1974 when he bought a 55-franchise cable system in southern New Jersey. He later moved to West Palm Beach, Florida, and Mamaroneck, New York.

He sold his company in 1981 to the New York Times (NYT) for $82.7 million. Kahn become a consultant for NYT and was paid six $4 million installments to work with them; he also agreed not to compete with them.

== Death ==
Irving Berlin Kahn died in Boston, Massachusetts. He was survived by his wife of 45 years, Elizabeth Heslin Kahn, his two daughters, Ruth (a painter and director of an arts center in Queens, NY) and Jean, of New York, and his sister, Mildred, of West Palm Beach, Florida.
