= The First Hundred Years =

Television series

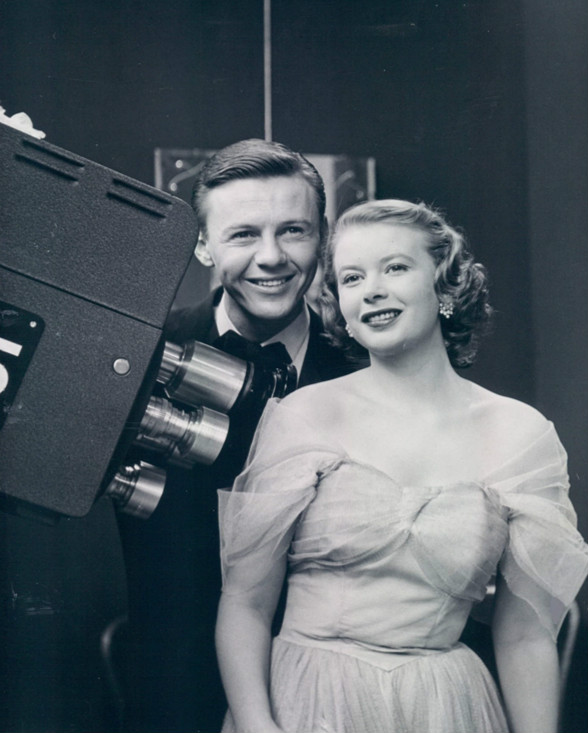
Jimmy Lydon and Olive Stacey as newlyweds Chris and Connie, 1951

The First Hundred Years is the first ongoing television soap opera in the United States that began as a daytime serial, airing on CBS from December 4, 1950 until June 27, 1952.

A previous daytime drama on NBC, These Are My Children, aired in 1949 but only lasted one month, and NBC's Hawkins Falls began in June 1950 as a primetime soap and didn't move to daytime until April 1951.

The show began with the wedding of Chris Thayer and Connie Martin, which lasted for the first week of episodes. The couple settled down in a huge, unkept white elephant mansion, a present from Connie's father.

The series did not succeed due to very low viewership, as few American households had television sets, and fewer still watched during the afternoon.

The series was replaced with the television version of Guiding Light, which would prove to be much more successful, airing for 57 years (72 years total when its 15-year run on radio is taken into account).

== Cast ==
- Chris Thayer - Jimmy Lydon
- Connie Thayer - Olive Stacey, Anne Sargent (later)
- Mr. Thayer (Chris's father) - Dan Tobin
- Mrs. Thayer (Chris's mother) - Valerie Cossart
- Mr. Martin (Connie's father) - Robert Armstrong
- Mrs. Martin (Connie's mother) - Nana Bryant
- Margie (Connie's sister) - Nancy Malone

== Background ==
The First Hundred Years was an ABC radio program in 1949, described as a "new angle domestic situation comedy". Sam Edwards and Barbara Eiler portrayed Chris and Connie Thayer. The supporting cast included Bea Benaderet, Joseph Kearns, Myra Marsh, and Earle Ross. The announcer was Owen James.

A television episode, "The First Hundred Years", was broadcast on The Silver Theatre on CBS on May 1, 1950, starring Barbara Whiting, William Frawley, Lydon, and Allene Roberts. The Bigelow Theatre broadcast it on March 11, 1951. The trade publication Billboard reported that CBS won "the network battle for the highly important Procter & Gamble daytime television billings" and that Benton & Bowles advertising agency won "a three-way scramble" for the account.

Another trade publication, Ross Reports on Television Programming, commented, "only an advertiser of the stature of Procter & Gamble could afford to experiment with a medium as expensive as television.... and "The First Hundred Years" is an experiment — can the success of the soap opera in radio can be paralleled in television?"

== See also ==
- Hubert Schlafly, invented the Teleprompter for this series

== Production ==
The First Hundred Years was sponsored by Procter & Gamble and was broadcast at 2:30 p.m. Eastern Time Monday through Friday. Jean Holloway was the writer. Hoyt Allen was the producer, and Bud Gammon was the director. Cy Harrice was the announcer, and Clark Morgan played the organ. The cast worked seven or eight hours per day to prepare each episode. Thirty people worked on the show in addition to the regular members of the cast.

The program originated from WCBS-TV. CBS converted much of its Liederkranz Hall studios for shooting the series with "three permanent sets involving living rooms, kitchens, and other rooms for each of the three families." Outdoor settings were filmed in Long Island and Westchester, and "the illusion of an outdoors setting" was created by using rear projection. Cameras were positioned in the center of the studio, with no stage and no audience.

== Critical response ==
CBS promoted the program prior to its debut as depicting "the ludicrous aspects of young married life", with an emphasis on "hilarious comedy", but Jack Gould wrote in The New York Times, "On the first show, however, the comedy lines were pretty strained and the element of farce largely pushed aside in favor of routine emotion." He also noted that Tobin and Cossart appeared too young to be Chris's parents, looking more like his brother and sister.

Radio Television Mirror's April 1951 issue reported that once the Thayers returned from their honeymoon, "there hasn't been a dull moment since — for the audience or for the hard-working cast."
