= Nikolayev (surname) =

Nikolayev, also spelled Nikolaev (Russian: Николаев), or Nikolayeva/Nikolaeva (feminine; Николаева), is a Russian patronymic surname derived from the male given name Nikolay and literally means Nikolay's. It may refer to:

- Aleksey Nikolayev (disambiguation)
- Alexander Fedorovich Nikolayev, Soviet Air Force officer, test pilot and Hero of the Soviet Union
- Alexander Nikolayev, Red Army officer and Hero of the Soviet Union
- Andrian Nikolayev, Soviet cosmonaut
- Aysen Nikolayev, Russian politician of Yakut ethnicity, Head of the Sakha Republic
- Gennady Nikolayev (1936–2013), Soviet swimmer
- Igor Nikolayev, Russian pop singer and composer
- Konstantin Nikolaev, Russian billionaire, Russian investor in American Ethane & financial supporter of Maria Butina
- Leonid Nikolaev, Russian communist, the assassin of Sergei Kirov
- Leonid Vladimirovich Nikolayev, Russian pianist, composer, and pedagogue
- Mikhail Nikolayev, Russian politician and deputy of the State Duma
- Mikhail Arkhipovich Nikolayev, Soviet sergeant and posthumous Hero of the Soviet Union
- Mikhail Vasilyevich Nikolayev, Soviet army officer and Hero of the Soviet Union
- Nikita Nikolayev, Russian association football player
- Nikolay Nikolaev — several people
- Oleg Nikolayev, several people
- Olga Nikolaeva, Russian volleyball player
- Sergei Nikolayev (disambiguation)
- Tatiana Nikolayeva, Russian pianist
- Vadim Nikolaev, Russian politician
- Victoria Nikolaeva, Russian politician
- Viktor Arsenievich Nikolaev (1893–1960), Russian and Soviet geologist
- Vladimir Nikolayev (disambiguation), several people
- Yelena Nikolayeva (disambiguation), several people
- Yevgeni Nikolayev, Soviet army officer and Hero of the Soviet Union
- Yuri Nikolaev (1948–2025), Soviet and Russian TV and radio host, and actor
