= Elena Nikolaeva =

Elena Nikolaeva, Olena Nikolaeva, or Yelena Nikolayeva (Russian: Елена Николаева) (Ukrainian: Олена Ніколаєва) may refer to:

- Olena Nikolaeva (1926–2009), Ukrainian television presenter and film producer
- Elena Nikolaeva (journalist) (born 1985), Russian journalist
- Elena Nikolaeva (actress) (born 1983), Russian actress
- Elena Nikolaeva (poet) (1936–2011), Soviet and Russian poet and translator
- Elena Nikolaeva (politician) (born 1969), Russian politician and businesswoman
- Yelena Nikolayeva (racewalker) (born 1966), Russian racewalker
- Elena Nikolaeva (film director) (born 1955), Russian film director
