= Novela Serpionova =

First television presenter in Ukraine

- Новела Серпіонова
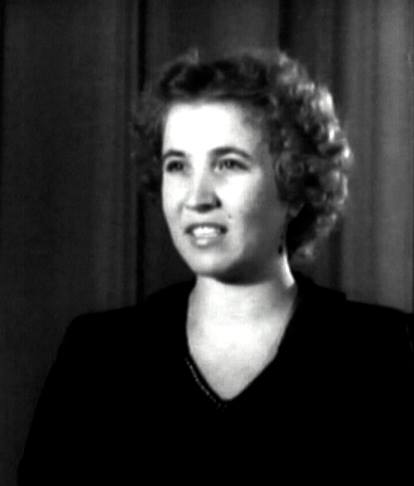
- Born: ?
- Died: June 28, 1982
- Occupation: Radio announcer
- Known for: The first television presenter in the history of Ukraine

Novela Serpionova was a Ukrainian radio announcer who became the very first television presenter in the history of television in Ukraine. She joined the team of Ukrainian Television (UT) at the Kyiv Television and Radio Center in 1951, but returned to radio (in the same building but on a different floor) just a year later. As a result, she was largely forgotten by the Ukrainian population, who largely remembered Olga Danylenko and Olena Nikolaeva as the first presenters.

At the time, expectations for television announcers were exceptionally high. Unlike today's presenters, who benefit from teleprompters, earpieces, and other on-air aids, early announcers had to memorize long texts and deliver them live without assistance. Serpionova explained that ine reason she returned to radio was that, unlike television, radio performers were not required to memorize a full block of text for a short segment, instead, they could simply read from the script placed in front of them.

Strict rules governed on-screen appearance. Announcers were required to wear formal attire—only jackets and long skirts were permitted; trousers were strictly prohibited, as were exposed necklines or bare arms. These dress codes had to be followed even under challenging conditions. The intense lighting used in early studios often pushed the temperature as high as 40 degrees Celsius, making live broadcasts physically demanding as well as mentally rigorous.
