= Recording Studio of the United States House of Representatives =

Facility of the United States Congress

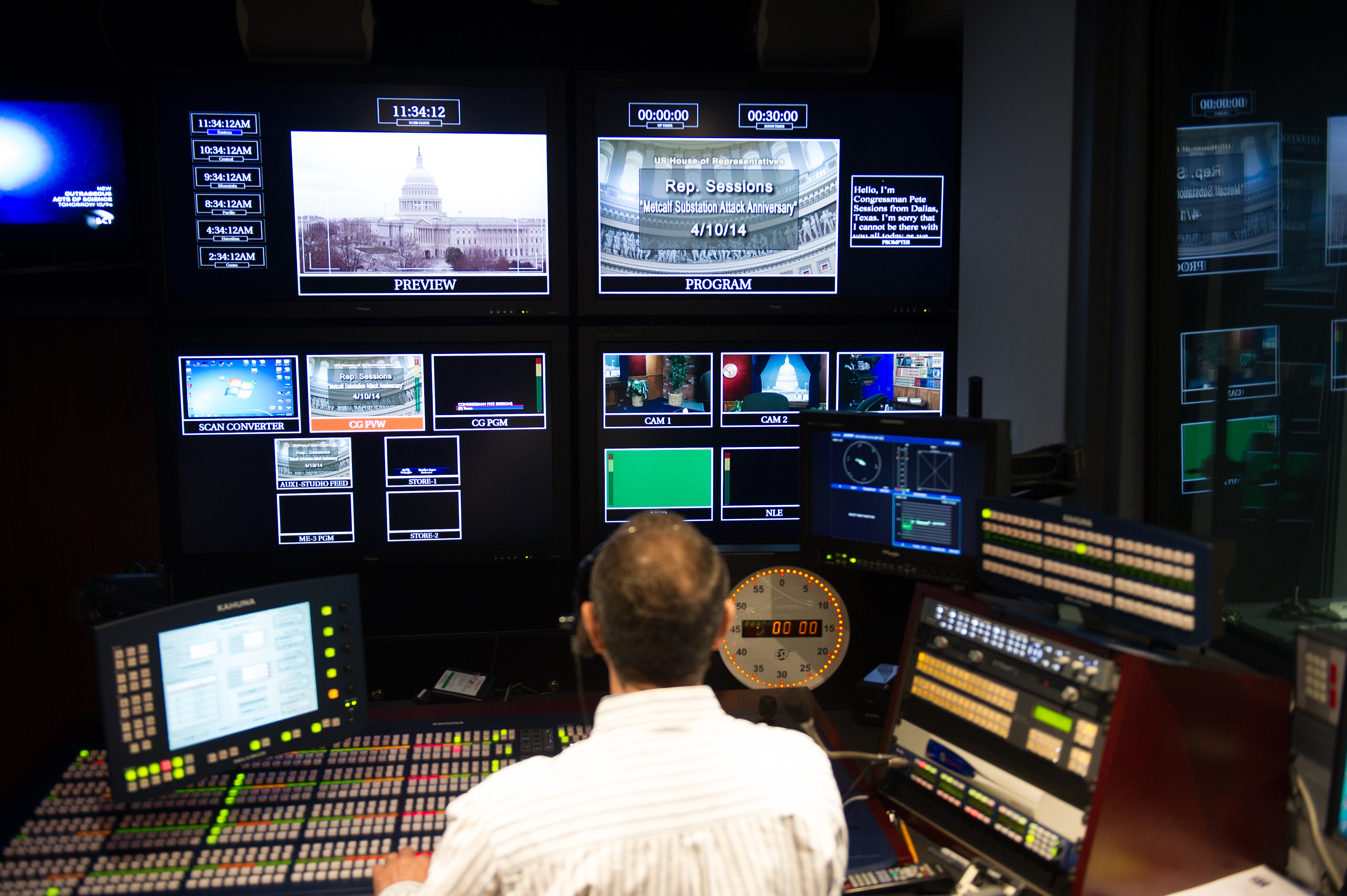
An employee of the House Recording Studio prepares for a video shoot by a House Member.

The House Recording Studio provides radio and television recording services to members, committees, and officers of the United States House of Representatives. The studio's purpose is to provide a convenient way for members to convey information to their constituents, the media, and the general public.

The studio was established by the authority of 2 U.S.C. § 123b and consists of two radio studios, two television studios, and tape duplication facilities. The services provided include basic recording services, live or recorded satellite transmissions, telephone recordings, preparation of teleprompter scripts, transcription of recorded material, post-production services, and television makeup. The studio staff also provide program production and technical assistance. Each time a member uses the recording studio, the member’s official account is charged for the services provided.

== History ==
Prior to the establishment of the House Recording Studio, television cameras were only occasionally allowed into the Chamber of the House of Representatives for special events such as the State of the Union and for speeches by visiting foreign dignitaries. The first time that a full House session was publicly televised was on March 19, 1979, with Rep. Al Gore being the first House Member to give a live televised speech during a session of the Congress.

Shortly after, the House approved the permanent establishment of its own TV and broadcasting system, starting with the installation of six cameras in the Chamber and a dedicated studio space in the United States Capitol basement.
