= Interrotron =

Device for conducting video interviews

The Interrotron is a device invented by filmmaker Errol Morris for conducting video interviews, allowing interviewers and subjects to make eye contact with each other while looking directly at the camera lens. This is achieved through a modified teleprompter setup, with the interviewer's face displayed on a monitor in front of the camera lens and the subject's face on a similar setup facing the interviewer, facilitating a more natural conversation.

== Development ==
Morris developed the Interrotron to improve the interview process in documentary filmmaking. The name "Interrotron" was coined by Morris's wife, Julia Sheehan, combining the concepts of "interview" and "terror," aiming to reduce the interviewee's discomfort. This setup allows for a more intimate and engaging interview, where subjects often reveal more about themselves or their stories.

Morris's invention has significantly impacted the style and approach of documentary interviews. Critics and filmmakers alike have noted the device's effectiveness in establishing a unique connection between the subject and the viewer.

== Technical aspects ==
The Interrotron utilizes beam splitter glass and a monitor setup, allowing direct eye contact and reducing the interviewee's anxiety. This technique is not only beneficial for the production quality but also allows the device to be used as a teleprompter by displaying text instead of the interviewer's face.

== Reception ==
The Interrotron has been praised for its ability to create a more personal and engaging interview experience, though some argue it can lead to an overly stylized portrayal of the subject. Its use has influenced documentary filmmaking beyond Morris' work.
