= Sergei Nikolayev =

Sergei Nikolayev may refer to:

- Sergei Nikolayev (footballer) (born 1978), Russian football player
- Sergei Nikolayev (ice hockey) (born 1972), Russian ice hockey player
- Sergey Nikolaev (cyclist) (born 1988), Russian cyclist
- Sergey Nikolayev (shot putter) (born 1966), Russian shot putter
- Sergei Nikolaev (linguist) (born 1954), Russian linguist
