= Olga Danylenko =

Ukrainian television news personality (died 1970)

- Ольга Прохорівна Даниленко
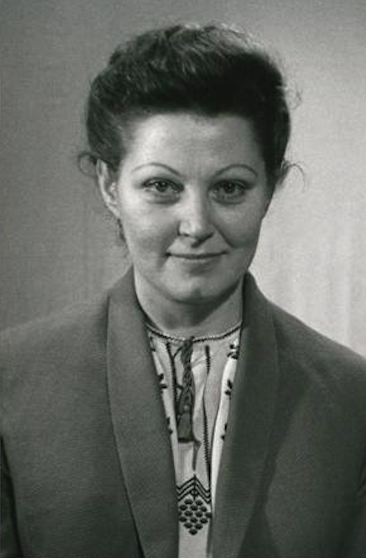
- Born: October 23, 1923; Pereiaslav, Poltava Governorate, Ukrainian Soviet Socialist Republic, USSR
- Died: January 1, 1970 (Aged 46); Kyiv, Ukrainian Soviet Socialist Republic, USSR
- Known for: The first television news presenter in Ukraine

Olga Prokhorivna Danylenko was one of the first three television presenters in the history of Ukraine, sharing the title with Novela Serpionova and Olena Nikolaeva, and a foundational figure in the development of Ukrainian television broadcasting. She effectively inaugurated televised programming in the country during the early years of state television, beginning around the mid-1950s. Because of her heavy Ukrainian accent, she was later joined by Olena Nikolaeva, a trained actress who had perfect Russian diction. Together, the pair created the standards of Ukrainian television news in the early days of television, and trained a generation of journalists that lived through the dissolution of the USSR.

The Soviet historian Volodymyr Sappak once wrote of Danylenko:

"The beautiful Ukrainian woman seemed to have stepped out of a holiday poster, Olga Danylenko. She was considered a screen standard, an object of love and admiration to all Ukrainians."

== Career in television ==
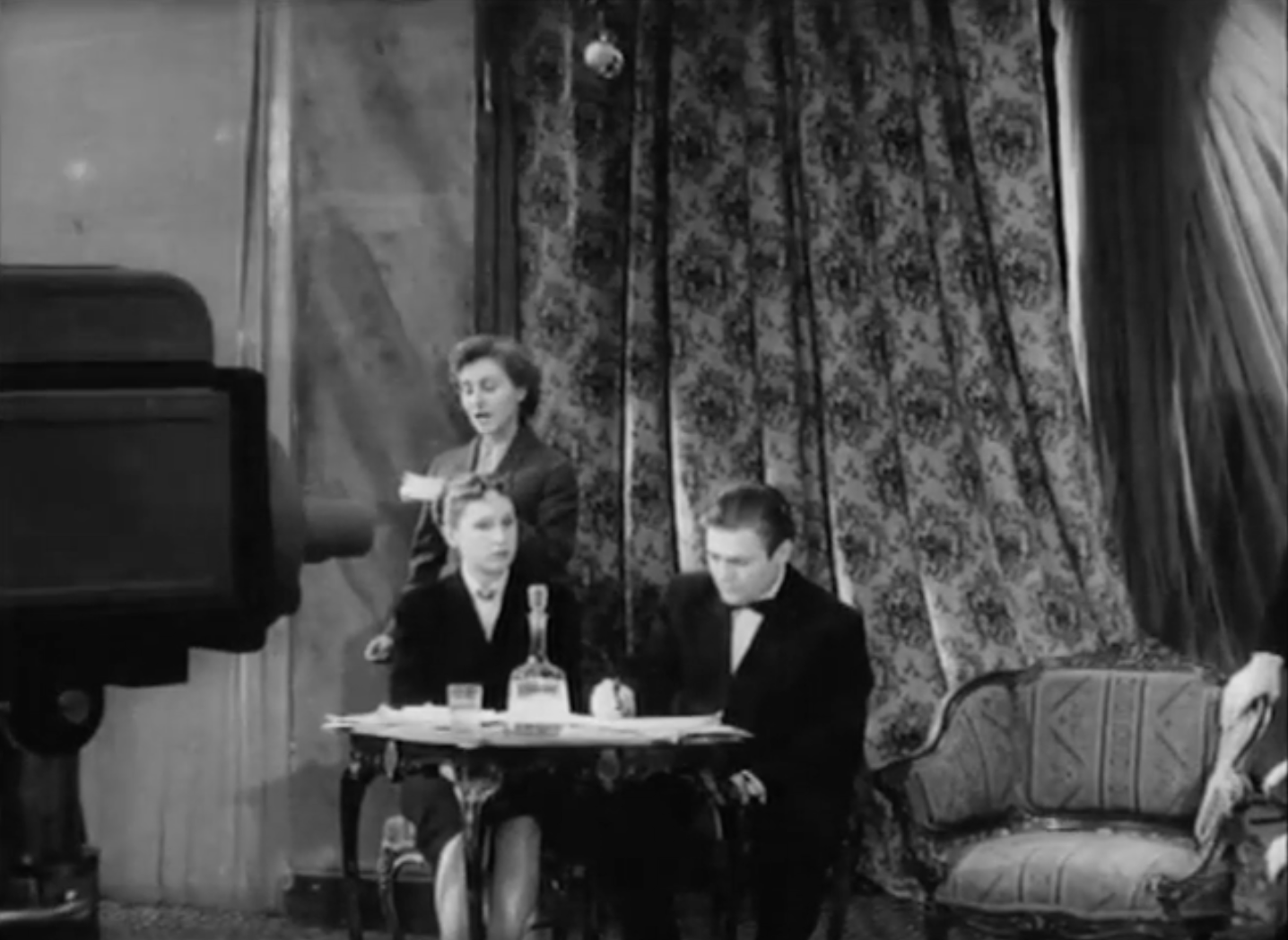
In 1952, Olga Danylenko (standing) and Olena Nikolaeva (seated left) practice their lines before one of the first broadcasts in Ukrainian television history. Just outside of the frame is Novela Serpionova.

In 1952, the first regular television broadcast in the history of Ukraine occurred on the airwaves of UA:1 at the Kyiv Television and Radio Center, more commonly referred to by its street address, Khreshchatyk 26, located on Khreshchatyk Street in Kyiv. The three women involved in the first news broadcasts on Ukrainian television in that year were Olga Danylenko, Olena Nikolaeva, and Novela Serpionova.

The title of "first broadcaster in Ukraine" has been in dispute between Danylenko and Novella for some time, but historians generally agree that Nikolaeva was the third to arrive at the station. Novella is technically the first television broadcaster in the history of Ukraine, because she presided over the filming of a live concert that was performed in Khreshchatyk 26, but this was not a news segment. In 1952, the first two women performed screen tests: Novella's screen test was first, Danylenko's screen test was second. Nikolaeva's screen test would not be performed until 1953, when Serpionova decided to return to her work in radio. The women stood in front of the camera and said:

"Good evening, fellow viewers! We are starting the television broadcast of the Kyiv Television Center. We are presenting a text table and music for tuning television radio receivers."

Construction of the TV Center at Khreshchatyk 26 had begun only in 1949, at the insistence of Nikita Khrushchev, who at that time was the economic leader of Ukraine. Joseph Stalin had authorized 43 million rubles to complete the structure – but since all contact with American TV companies had ceased shortly after the beginning of the Cold War (including the company that had won the contract to construct the Moscow TV Center), a Russian immigrant and electronics engineer named Vladimir Zvorykin had to design everything in the building himself. Danylenko's original broadcasts were conducted using many of Zvorykin's inventions. These broadcasts were largely viewed on KVN-49's, where by 1951, there were 661 in the city of Kyiv. In 1956, the first television news broadcast occurred, hosted by Danylenko and Nikolaeva. Three years later, in 1959, video footage appeared in newscasts. At that time, the news program was called Television Newsreel. Danylenko hosted this show.

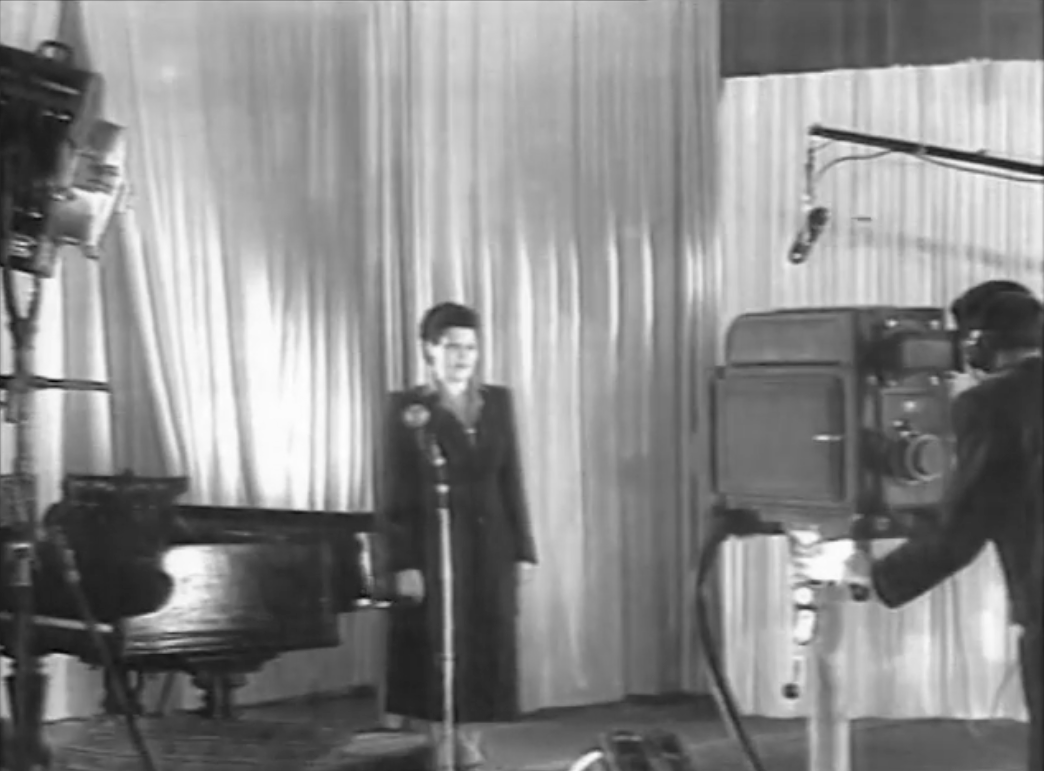
Olga Danylenko performs the first television news broadcast from Kyiv Television and Radio Center in 1956.

Danylenko was known by her audience and her coworkers for her professionalism and dedication, and was greatly respected by her Ukrainian audience. However, due to her accented Russian, she was not considered by the Soviet bosses to be suitable enough for live broadcasts relayed to Moscow. Roughly a year into her career, in 1953, this limitation led to the inclusion of Olena Nikolaeva as Danylenko's co-host, who was selected for her clear Russian diction and training as an actress. Despite this division of labor, Danylenko maintained a central role in news presentation and state-oriented programming.

Danylenko and Nikolaeva are widely recognized as the first faces of Ukrainian television, being the only two women on television for several years. They worked exclusively in live broadcast formats, as video recording technology had not yet been introduced. Their public visibility was high—both were frequently recognized on the street and received significant quantities of viewer correspondence. Their level of national popularity was unprecedented and remains a benchmark in the history of Ukrainian broadcast media.

Throughout her career, Danylenko worked under difficult technical conditions. Early television production required high-intensity lighting for the analog cameras, often raising studio temperatures above 30°C. This made working conditions physically demanding, particularly for Danylenko, who was required by the Soviet bosses to wear formal jackets to maintain a professional on-screen appearance. Her duties often included reading political news and conducting live interviews with party officials, roles that required both composure and adherence to strict editorial guidelines. Over time, the visual expectations for television changed, and a shift toward younger on-screen personalities occurred.

== Move back to radio and death ==
Danylenko's co-host, Olena Nikolaeva, demanded of station management to go back to her life in the theatre. Her Soviet bosses declined the request, because they preferred her on-screen presence over Danylenko. However, the Soviet bosses privately told Nikolaeva in a conversation: "Danylenko is old, but she acts like a horny teenager, heaving her big breasts about when she talks." This was despite the fact that Nikolaeva was only three years younger than Danylenko. Soon after this conversation, Nikolaeva found a reason to leave the station. She never spoke about why she left the station in 1966, but her daughter also later revealed that she had formed a relationship with a cameraman at the station (whom she later married), and this caused a scandal. She left to join Ukrtelefim, and Danylenko stayed on the air at UA:1.

Danylenko was eventually dismissed from her role on television due to such "age-related image" policies. The superiors wanted someone who looked younger on the screen. Danylenko's departure from broadcasting was not accompanied by public recognition or institutional honors. She briefly worked in radio following her television career but died of a Pulmonary edema not long afterward. Reports from contemporaries suggest that she experienced emotional distress following her departure from television and withdrew from public life. "Television was her life," one of her colleagues said. Despite her critical role in the formation of Ukrainian television, she did not receive formal accolades such as state awards, commendations, or material benefits.

Danylenko did not marry or have children.

== See also ==
- Television in Ukraine
