= Autocue =

UK-based manufacturer of teleprompter systems

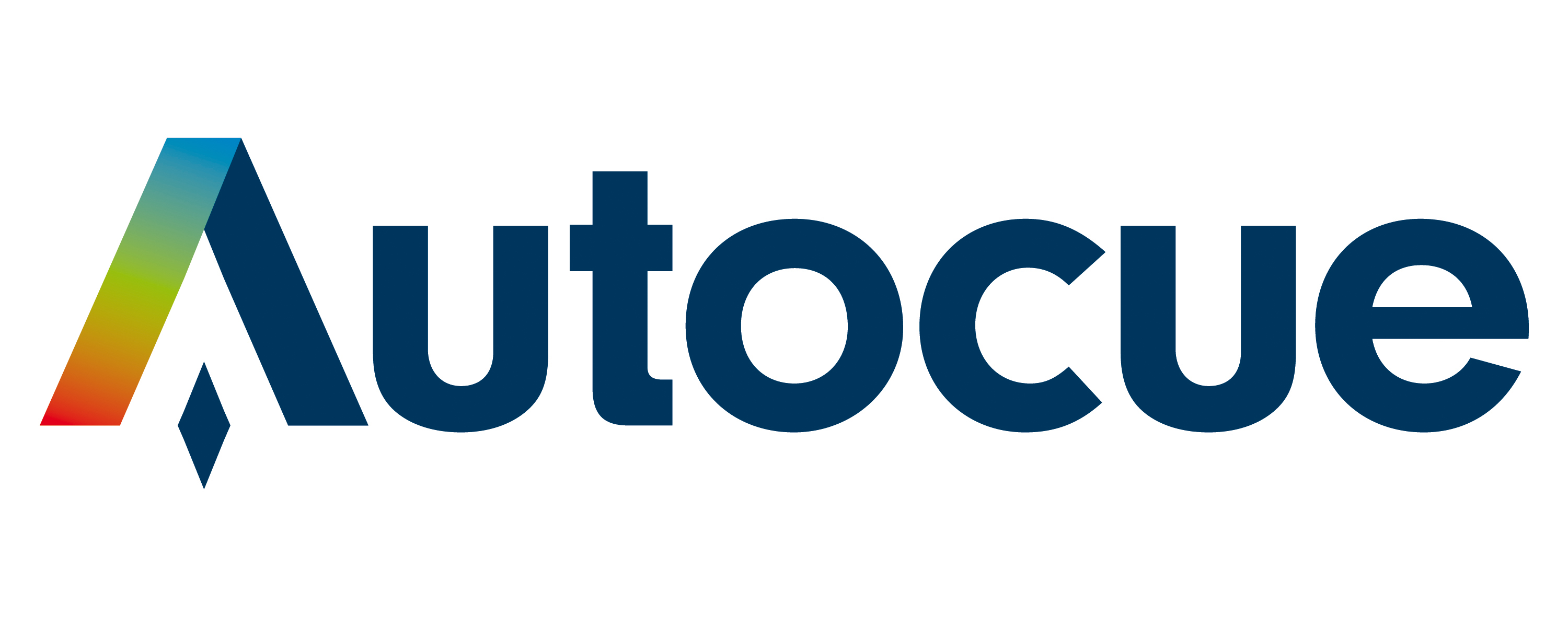
Autocue logo

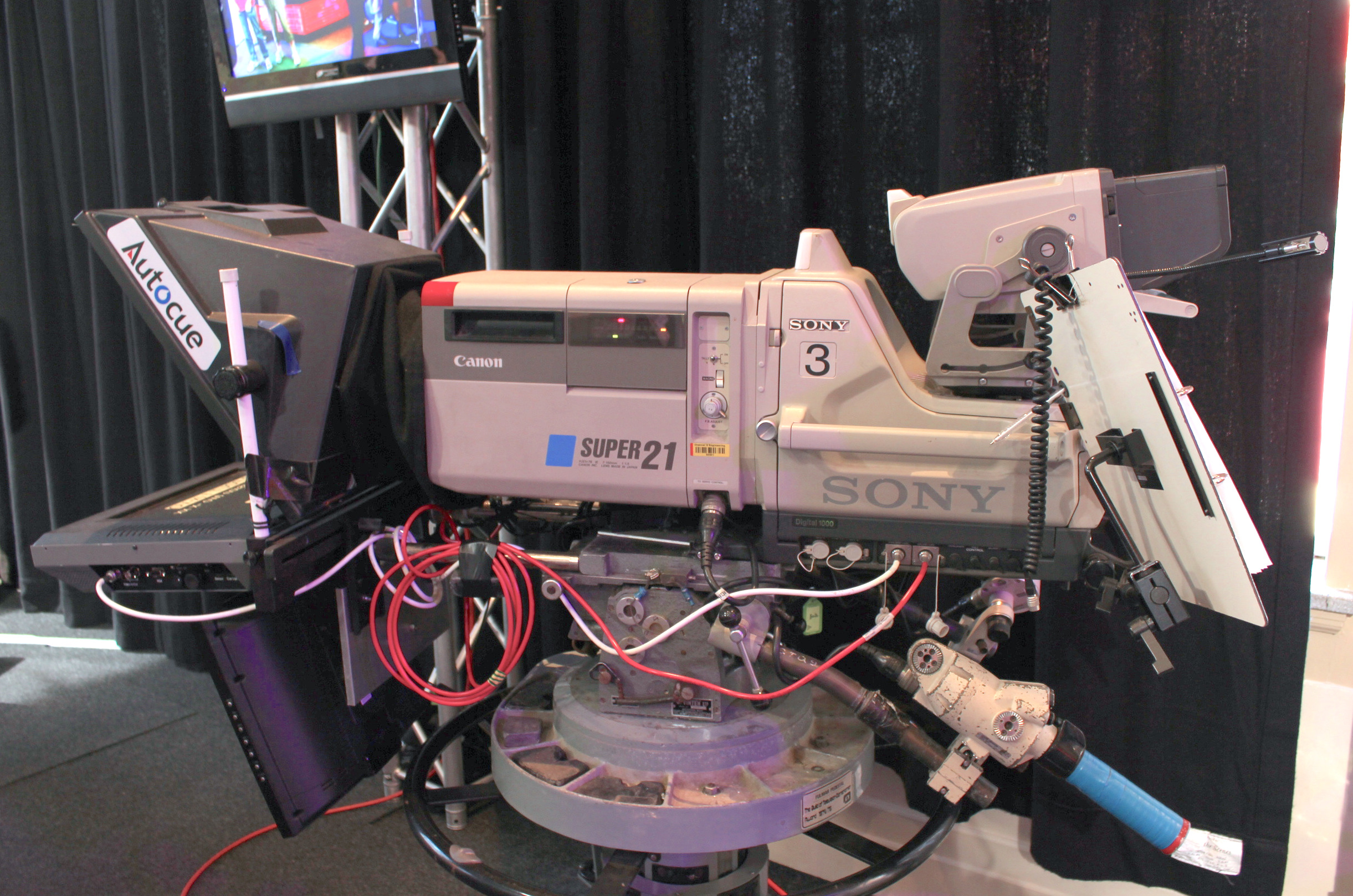
Studio camera with Autocue teleprompter

Autocue is a UK-based manufacturer of teleprompter systems. The company was founded in 1955 and licensed its first on-camera teleprompter, based on a patent by Jess Oppenheimer, in 1962. Its products are used by journalists, presenters, politicians and video production staff in almost every country in the world. In Dutch, "autocue" became a genericized trademark as there is no Dutch word for teleprompter.

== History of Autocue and teleprompting ==
=== Prompting begins on paper ===
Prompting began with Jess Oppenheimer, a writer, producer and director on the TV show I Love Lucy in the early 1950s. To solve the problem of the actors forgetting their lines, he developed the teleprompter system. Oppenheimer took out a patent on the system. He licensed the patent to the teleprompting company Autocue in 1955. Meanwhile, a separate entity, QTV, was established in the US. Both companies started by renting teleprompting equipment to studios and these were the first "on-camera" teleprompters in the world.

Oppenheimer's paper-roll system survived until 1969 when Autocue introduced the first closed-circuit prompter. This used a closed-circuit camera system to screen a live video of a scrolling paper script, and display the image on a monitor attached to the front of the camera. The use of a two-way mirror system allowed the script image to be reflected onto a sheet of glass in front of the camera lens, meaning that the presenters were able to read their lines straight from the script while looking directly into the camera. The mirror system meant that the image of the script was not visible to the main camera lens, and indeed this is still the way that most teleprompting systems operate. QTV followed shortly afterwards with similar technology. In the 1970s both companies started selling hardware in addition to maintaining their rental operations.

In 1984, QTV acquired Autocue and retained the two brands in their respective regions. The following year, the newly formed Autocue Group released a computer-driven prompting system, ScriptNet. At the same time the first newsroom computer systems were beginning to appear in television stations.

=== Prompting enters the digital era ===
Autocue and QTV were also interested in digital prompting, leading to the development of their own scriptwriting and running order package. This package is used by many newsrooms, conferences, sitcoms, major drama productions, and more. This system worked on an early version of Microsoft Windows, and was named WinCue.

In 1994, the Autocue Group created the first flatscreen prompters.

The ability to receive, index and process stories from news agency wires was an early addition. Another requirement was the ability to control multiple playout devices, such as videotape machines and character generators, from a central running order. The Autocue Group accordingly developed its own automation system, as applicable to programme playout as to news. This was followed by the ability to handle media as well as words. Following a project with CNN, a wireless tablet PC-based system to effect and share script changes using ‘digital ink’ was added.

In 1998, a newsroom application company, DCM, based in Charlotte, North Carolina, was acquired to complement the existing newsroom product range.

Autocue have since introduced an IP-based prompting system, QMaster/QBox, which allows prompting over a network over any distance.
