= Olena Nikolaeva =

Ukrainian television presenter in the 1950's

- Олена Петрівна Ніколаєва
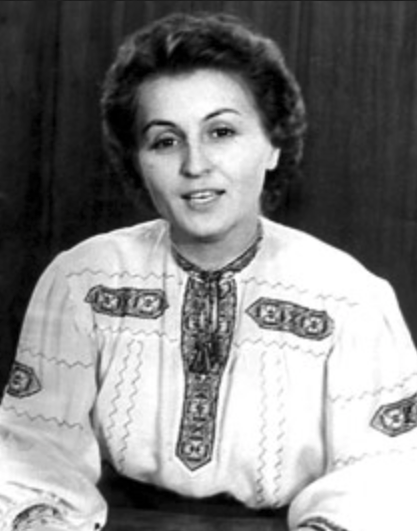
- Born: July 21, 1926; Kharkiv Oblast, Ukrainian Soviet Socialist Republic, USSR
- Died: 2009 (aged 82–83); Kyiv, Ukraine
- Known for: One of the first television presenters in Ukraine

Olena Petrivna Nikolaeva was a trained actress who became one of the first three television presenters in the history of Ukraine, coming third in succession after Novela Serpionova and Olga Danylenko. She was a pioneering figure in the history of Ukrainian television broadcasting, training many of the presenters that would come after her. Alongside Olga Danylenko, she formed the foundational voice and face of Ukrainian television in its earliest decades. After her career in television, Nikolaeva moved into to the film production industry.

== Career in theatre ==
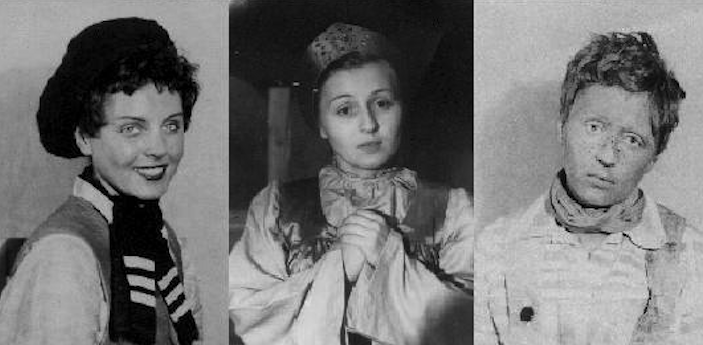
Before her entry into television, Nikolaeva was an actress at the Kyiv Youth Theatre.

Olena Nikolaeva began her professional career as a dramatic actor after graduating from a theatre institute in Kyiv. She was initially assigned to the Kyiv Youth Theatre (TYUG), where she performed travesty roles, portraying a variety of characters such as boys, girls, and comedic animals in children's productions.

Following her first husband's reassignment to the Chernihiv Theater, Nikolaeva relocated and worked there as well. Upon their return to Kyiv, she discovered that employment opportunities at her previous theater were limited, with many roles reportedly taken by individuals with connections to high-ranking officials. Faced with limited options in theater, Nikolaeva was advised by the director of TYUG to apply for a position at the newly established Kyiv Television Center, known more commonly as Khreshchatyk 26, potentially as an assistant director.

== Career in television ==
Construction of the Kyiv Television and Radio Center at Khreshchatyk 26 had begun only in 1949, at the insistence of Nikita Khrushchev, who at that time was the economic leader of Ukraine. Joseph Stalin had authorized 43 million rubles to complete the structure – but since all contact with American TV companies had ceased shortly after the beginning of the Cold War (including the company that had won the contract to construct the Moscow TV Center), a Russian immigrant and electronics engineer named Vladimir Zvorykin had to design everything in the building himself. Nikolaeva's original broadcasts were conducted using many of Zvorykin's inventions. These broadcasts were largely viewed on KVN-49's, where by 1951, there were 661 in the city of Kyiv.

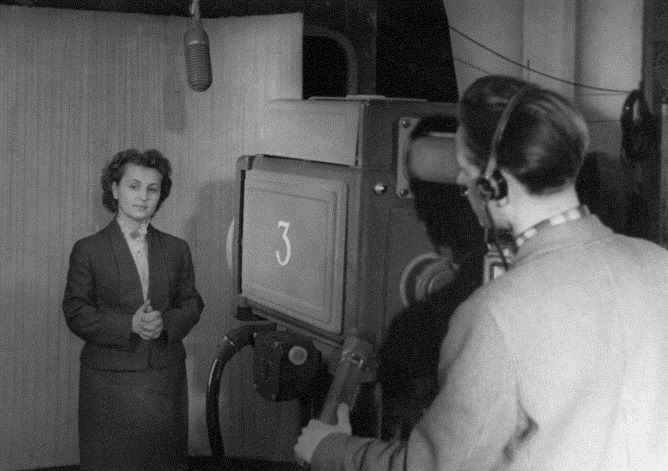
Olena Nikolaeva during one of the first television broadcasts in Ukraine, at Khreshchatyk 26.

During her interview, however, she was unexpectedly evaluated for the role of television presenter, a position she initially dismissed. Despite being told she was unsuitable by one administrator, she was soon noticed by director Mykola Petrovych Paschin, who insisted she was a good fit for the role and appointed her on the spot. She actually tried turning down the position, but station management and her Soviet bosses insisted: "You work for us now." Although Nikolaeva accepted the position, she later expressed regret over leaving the theater, describing her work in television as unsatisfying compared to her aspirations as a stage actress. Nevertheless, she went on to become one of the two inaugural announcers at UA:1 alongside Olga Danylenko.

Nikolaeva had been brought in to co-host alongside Danylenko because Danylenko spoke Russian with a heavy Ukrainian accent, and the Soviet bosses at that time did not believe that this was suitable for broadcasts that were relayed back to Moscow. Nikolaeva, therefore, who was a trained actress with perfect Russian diction was thought more suitable for the broadcasts.

Nikolaeva made her on-screen debut in 1953, replacing Novela Serpionova, who had gone back to work in radio that year, and worked closely with Olga Danylenko for 13 years. The two announcers became household names and were among the most recognizable public figures of their era. The journalist Iryina Kononeko from the Kyiv Daily News wrote that around this time: "there was a tendency that television announcers should be holier than the Pope."

Ukrainian television was still in its formative years and all broadcasts were conducted live, due to the absence of recording technology. During this period, live broadcasting was the norm, and announcers were required to memorize extensive texts, as teleprompters and cueing technologies hadn't been invented yet. Mistakes or improvisation were discouraged, though occasional word substitutions occurred. In contrast to the technical aids used by modern presenters, Nikolaeva and her peers worked under demanding, high-pressure conditions. Novela Serpionova stated that the reason for her returning to radio was partially because radio performers did not have to memorize a full block of text for a short segment, and a performer could simply read off of a paper in front of them. Nikolaeva's early role involved a variety of tasks, including reading announcements, introducing performances, including those by opera singer Yelyzaveta Chavdar, and hosting concerts. In the 1960s, she also began delivering television news.

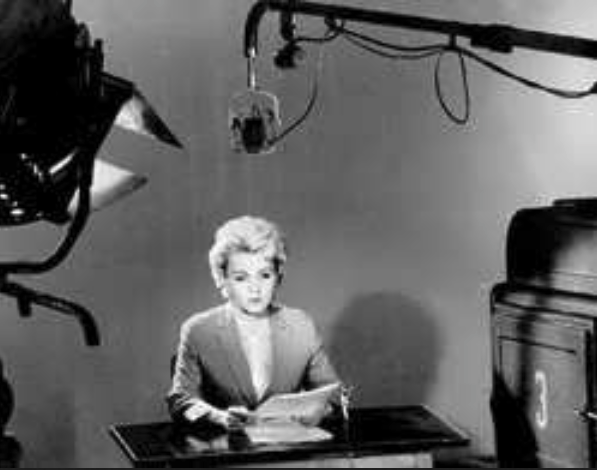
During the later part of her television career, Nikolaeva was known as blonde-haired, and her appearance contrasted with her Olga Danylenko, who wore black hair.

At the start of her career as a television announcer, her monthly salary was only 55 rubles, despite the high public visibility and expectations associated with the role. Announcers were expected to maintain a polished on-screen appearance, but were provided with minimal institutional support for clothing, hair, or makeup. Because of to the lack of support, Nikolaeva frequently had to negotiate with the Rosa Luxemburg Garment Factory to provide clothing and pushed for institutional help with styling. Eventually, announcers were permitted to have their hair professionally styled before broadcasts at the Cheremshyna hair salon. She directly confronted the Soviet Ukrainian Culture Minister Nikolai Skachko, questioning whether he could live on such a low wage while meeting the demands placed on announcers. Following this, their salary was slightly increased to 75 rubles, and later set at 125 rubles, though support remained limited.

Due to intense studio lighting required for early television cameras, working conditions in the studio were physically demanding, with temperatures often exceeding 30 °C. Despite this, Nikolaeva was still expected to appear composed and professional on screen. Nikolaeva and her colleagues had to be resourceful. She wore a limited wardrobe, consisting of a few Ukrainian embroidered blouses, a shirt with a guipure-trimmed collar, and a dark jacket. To vary her look, she creatively modified a plastic collar, adding flowers and adjusting its shape and positioning. She also styled her hair into a braid wrapped around her head, later cutting it and dyeing it blonde to visually differentiate herself from her colleague, Olga Danylenko, who also wore a braid.

The announcers prepared for broadcasts in inadequate physical conditions. Initially, they waited in poorly ventilated rooms or control areas with no windows. It was not until 1960 that dedicated facilities for announcers were introduced, improving the basic working environment.

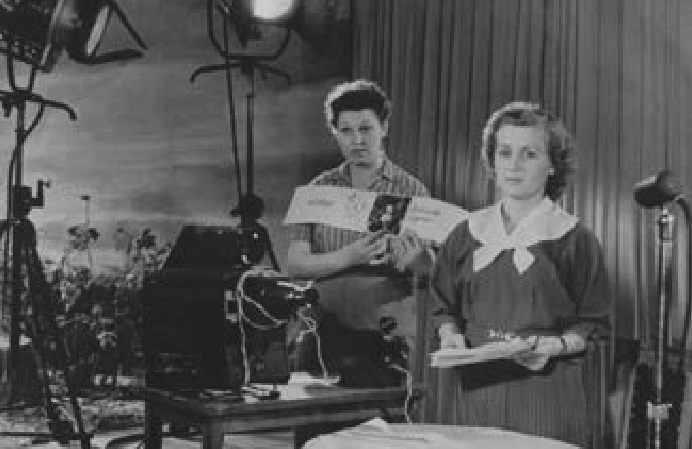
Olga Danylenko (left) and Olena Nikolaeva (right) had to completely memorize their lines before broadcasts.

Nikolaeva often appeared on-air wearing traditional Ukrainian vyshyvanka, which became a distinctive feature of her television persona. These garments were hand-embroidered by her grandmother and included a small selection of blue, white, and orange-toned shirts. Her appearance played a dual role—serving as a visual anchor for viewers adjusting television receivers in the pre-test pattern era and reinforcing national cultural imagery.

In 1966, Nikolaeva's departure from broadcasting was precipitated by a conflict within the television station. According to her daughter, she was forced to choose between her role as a television announcer and her marriage to a television cameraman, Arkady Derbyanyan. She chose to preserve the marriage, eventually leaving the station. The marriage lasted about a decade before ending in divorce.

Her co-host, Danylenko, was thought by her Soviet superiors to be too old to be on the television anymore, and was forced to return to radio. Danylenko died in 1970.

== Career as a film producer ==
After leaving her position as a television presenter, Nikolaeva began working as an assistant director at Ukrtelefilm, the Soviet state film studio responsible for television productions in the Ukrainian SSR. There, she participated in a range of productions, including television films and concert recordings.

The same year that Nikolaeva went to Urktelefilm, Volodymyr Shcherbytsky assumed the post of First Secretary of the Communist Party of Ukraine. Nikolaeva was tasked with assisting during the filming of one of his public addresses due to her background in broadcasting, which made her a trusted figure. While preparing Shcherbytsky for his televised appearance, he recognized Nikolaeva and initially struggled to place her. After being reminded of her previous work on television, he reportedly expressed surprise and admiration, lamenting her absence from the screen. He issued a direct order that she return to television immediately, even instructing his deputy to ensure compliance. However, due to prior filming obligations in Sevastopol, Nikolaeva could not fulfill the request. This incident occurred during a filming session overseen by Volodymyr Bortko, the Soviet and later Russian film director known for works such as The Heart of a Dog and The Master and Margarita.

During the preparation of a remake of the film Natalka-Poltavka, Nikolaeva played a decisive role in casting the lead role. Upon seeing a young actress, Nataliya Sumska, then newly employed at the Ivan Franko National Academic Drama Theater, Nikolaeva strongly advocated for her selection as the title character. Despite the director Rodion Yefymenko having chosen a different actress, Nikolaeva insisted on casting Sumska, reportedly declaring that she would leave the production team if her recommendation was not accepted. Her insistence ultimately led to Sumska securing the role.

Nikolaeva also worked on a televised concert featuring popular Yugoslav singer Đorđe Marjanović. After the filming, during a celebratory dinner, a waiter made an unusual request for Marjanović to become the godfather of his child. The singer agreed, on the condition that Nikolaeva would become the child's godmother. The two thus became "Kum and Kuma," (godparents). Marjanović subsequently invited Nikolaeva to visit Yugoslavia multiple times, though she never made the trip.

When Nikolaeva experienced difficulties regaining a telephone line after an apartment exchange, She sent a written request to the Central Committee in Shcherbytsky's name shortly before the Chernobyl nuclear disaster occurred in April 1986. Despite the national crisis, her issue was resolved, and she was notified within a month that a telephone line would be installed.

Despite her pioneering contributions, she, like many early Ukrainian broadcasters, did not receive significant official recognition—no formal awards, pensions, or honors.
