= Aleksey Nikolaev =

Alexey Nikolaev or Aleksey Nikolaev may refer to:

- Alexey Nikolaev (archer) (born 1987), Russian archer
- Aleksey Nikolaev (footballer, born 1979), Russian-Uzbekistan footballer for FK Samarqand-Dinamo
- Aleksei Nikolaev (referee) (born 1971), Russian football referee
- Alexey Grigoryevich Nikolayev, Soviet Army officer and Hero of the Soviet Union
- Aleksei Nikolayev (footballer, born 1985), Russian footballer for FC Torpedo Armavir
- Aleksey Nikolaev (wrestler), Belarusian freestyle wrestler
