= Elena Nikolaeva (journalist) =

Russian journalist

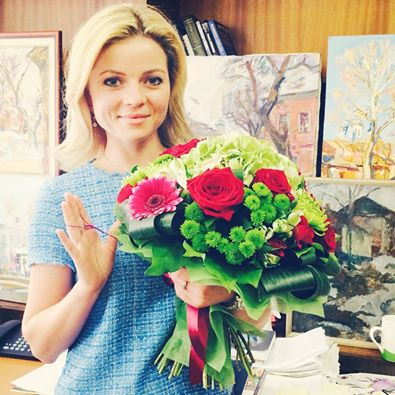
- Born: 25 December 1985 (age 40); Tashkent, Uzbek SSR, Soviet Union
- Occupation: Journalist

Elena Sergeevna Nikolaeva (Russian: Елена Сергеевна Николаева, born 25 December 1985 in Tashkent) is a Russian journalist. She has also performed episodic roles in several films. Having graduated from the Gubkin Russian State University of Oil and Gas, she worked as television presenter on Expert TV (2010–2013) and RBC TV (2013–2014). In September 2014, she moved on to Moscow 24.
