= Nikolay Nikolaev =

Nikolay Nikolaev or Nikolay Nikolayev may refer to:

- Nikolay Nikolaev (politician) (born 1970), Russian politician
- Nikolay Nikolaev (footballer, born 1992), Bulgarian footballer
- Nikolay Nikolaev (footballer, born 1997), Bulgarian footballer
