= Sergei Nikolayev (footballer) =

Russian footballer

Personal information
- Full name: Sergei Nikolayevich Nikolayev
- Date of birth: 24 September 1978 (age 48)
- Height: 1.65 m (5 ft 5 in)
- Position: Forward

Senior career*
Years	Team	Apps	(Gls)
1994–1995	FC Dynamo-GAI Nizhny Novgorod		
1995	FC Torpedo-Viktoriya Nizhny Novgorod (amateur)		
1995–1997	FC Lokomotiv Nizhny Novgorod	1	(0)
1996–1997	→ FC Lokomotiv-d Nizhny Novgorod (loans)	27	(0)
2005	FC Lokomotiv Lukoyanov		
- * Club domestic league appearances and goals

Sergei Nikolayevich Nikolayev (Russian: Сергей Николаевич Николаев; born 24 September 1978) is a former Russian football player.
