= Oleg Nikolayev =

Oleg Nikolayev may refer to:

- Oleg Nikolayev (boxer) (born 1968), Soviet boxer
- Oleg Nikolayev (footballer) (born 1998), Russian footballer
- Oleg Nikolayev (politician) (born 1969), Russian statesman, politician, and economist
