= Vladimir Nikolayev =

Vladimir Nikolayev may refer to:

- Vladimir Nikolayev (architect) (1847–1911), Russian Empire architect, City Architect of Kiev
- Vladimir Nikolayev (politician) (born 1973), Russian politician, city mayor of Vladivostok (2004–2007)
- Vladimir Nikolayev (murderer) (born 1959), Russian murderer
