= Elena Nikolaeva (poet) =

- Born: Velikiye Luki, Soviet Union
- Died: 30 June 2011 (aged 75); Petrozavodsk, Russia
- Education: Petrozavodsk State University
- Occupations: Poet, translator

Elena Mikhaylovna Nikolaeva (Russian: Елена Михайловна Николаева; 1936–2011) was a Soviet and Russian poet and translator. An alumnus of Petrozavodsk State University, she was a member of the Union of Soviet Writers.

== Awards ==
- Honoured Cultural Worker of the USSR
