= Teleprompter =

Display device that provides visual cues to a speaker

Schematic representation: (1) Video camera; (2) Shroud; (3) Video monitor; (4) Clear glass or beam splitter; (5) Image from subject; (6) Image from video monitor

A teleprompter, also known as an autocue, is a display device that prompts the person speaking with an electronic visual text of a speech or script.

Using a teleprompter is similar to using cue cards. The screen is in front of, and usually below, the lens of a professional video camera, and the words on the screen are reflected to the eyes of the presenter using a sheet of clear glass or other beam splitter, so that they are read by looking directly at the lens position, but are not imaged by the lens. Light from the performer passes through the front side of the glass into the lens, while a shroud surrounding the lens and the back side of the glass prevents unwanted light from entering the lens. Optically, this works in a very similar way to the Pepper's ghost illusion from classic theatre: an image viewable from one angle but not another.

Because the speaker can look straight at the lens while reading the script, the teleprompter creates the illusion that the speaker has memorized the speech or is speaking spontaneously, looking directly into the camera lens. Notes or cue cards, on the other hand, require the presenter to look at them instead of at the lens, which can cause the speaker to appear distracted, depending on the degree of deflection from the natural line of sight to the camera lens, and how long the speaker needs to glance away to glean the next speaking point; speakers who can internalize a full sentence or paragraph in a single short glance timed to natural breaks in the spoken cadence will create only a small or negligible impression of distraction.

The original TelePrompTer package was leased, not sold. The package consisted of four remote-controlled electronically synchronized script machines that are controlled by an operator from a fixed-position master control unit. Each unit was powered by a self-synchronizing motor which keeps the rollers that hold the script moving together at speeds up to 50 words a minute. The synchronized units allow the actor to refer to any of the teleprompter units and be sure that the arrow pointing to the line of text on each machine is pointing to the same place.

Considerable research went into the development of the first TelePrompTers. The Underwood Typewriter Company built special typewriters to type text 1 inch high, in four copies. The Standard Registry Business Firm Company developed special yellow paper, carbons, and ink that ensured maximum legibility of all four copies. The sprocketed paper could be spliced, allowing for last-minute deletions, corrections, and additions.

The technology has continued to develop, including the following iterations:

- first mechanical paper roll teleprompters — used by television presenters and speakers at U.S. political conventions in 1952
- dual glass teleprompters — used by TV presenters and for U.S. conventions in 1964
- computer-based rolls of 1982 and the four-prompter system for U.S. conventions — added a large off-stage confidence monitor and inset lectern monitor in 1996
- replacement of glass teleprompters at U.K. political conferences by several large off-stage confidence monitors in 2006.

TelePrompTer in the US and Autocue in Commonwealth and some European countries were originally trade names but have become genericized trademarks used for any such display device.

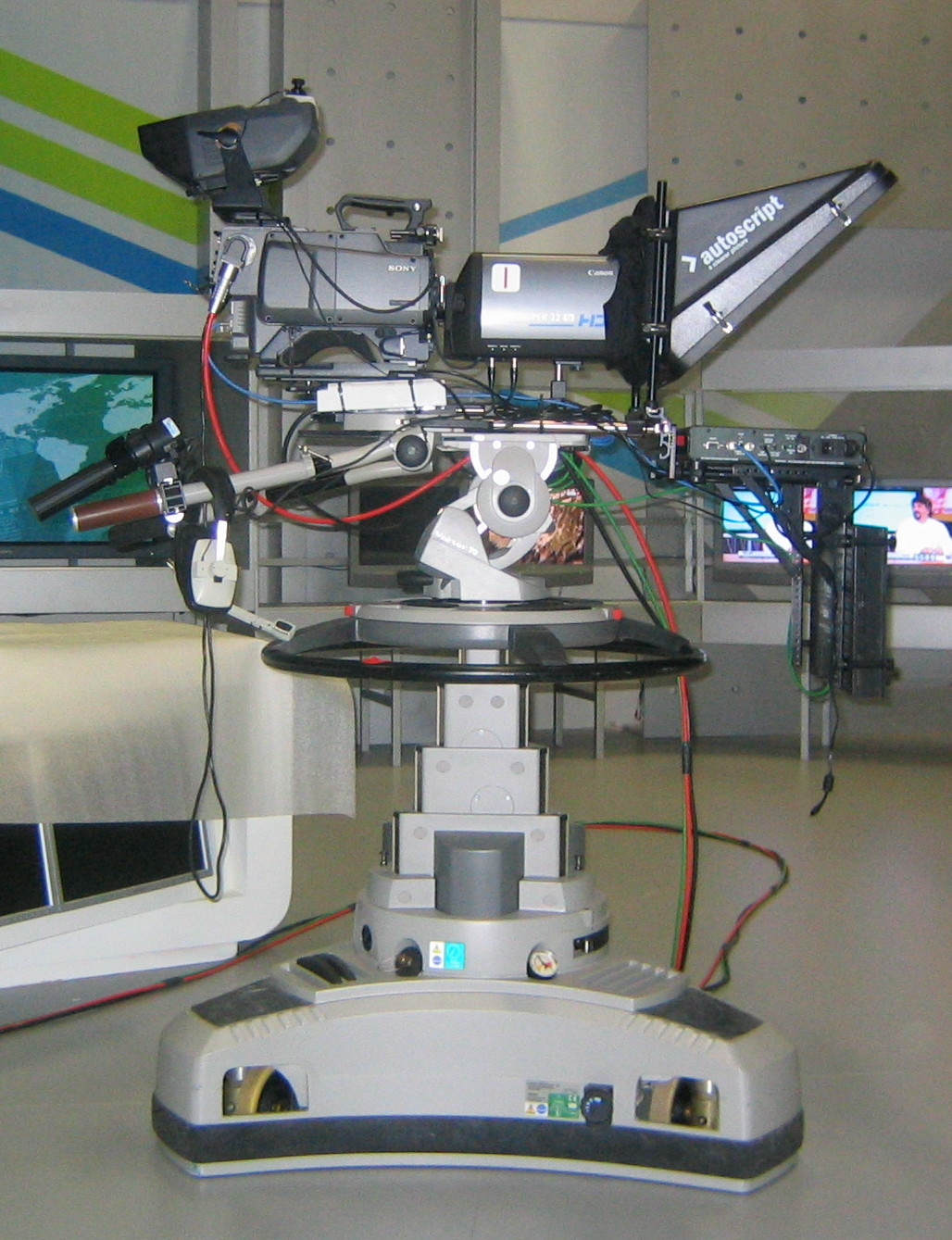
TV camera with lens and a teleprompter on a pedestal

== History ==
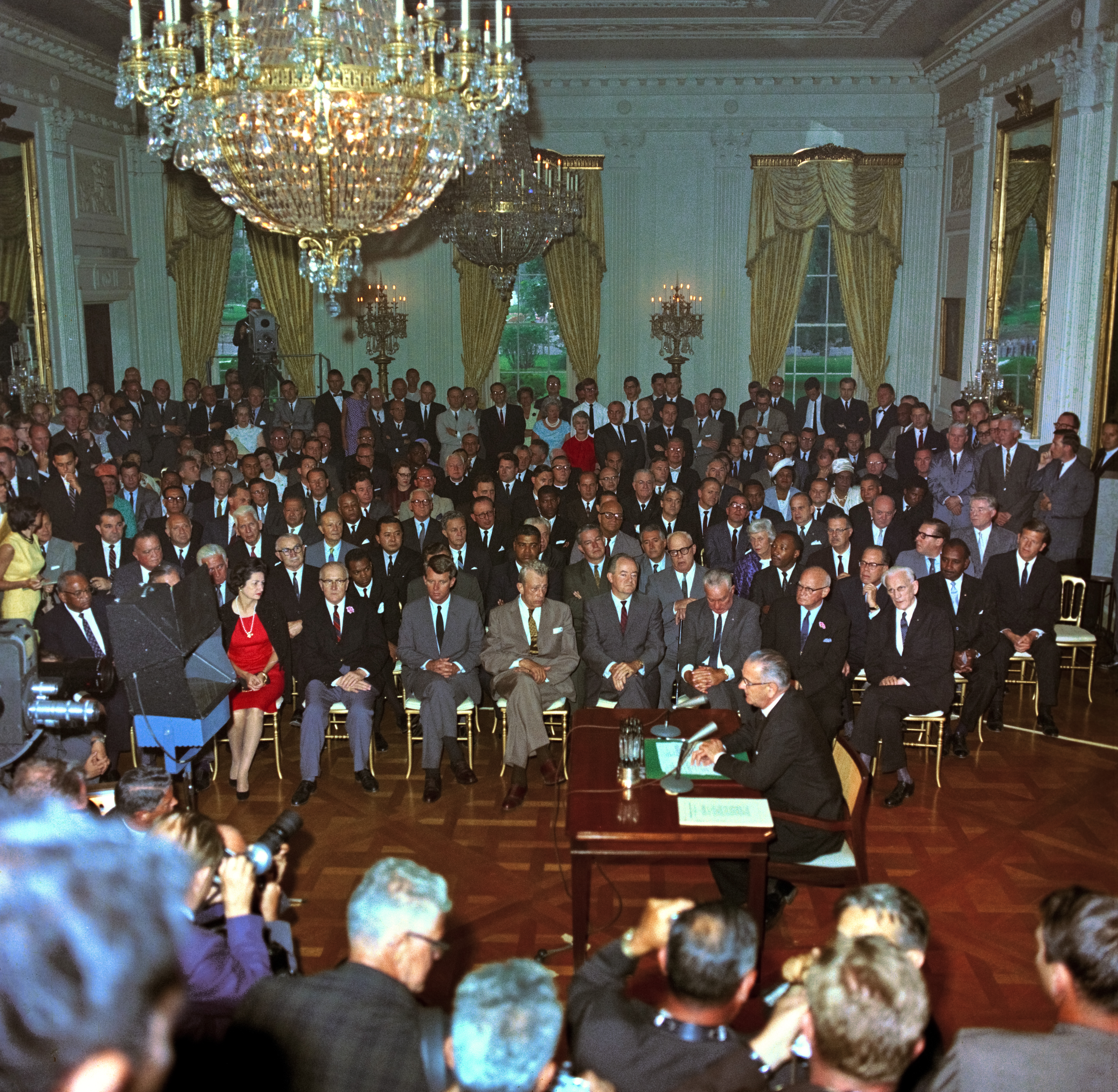
U.S. President Lyndon B. Johnson uses a teleprompter while announcing the Civil Rights Act of 1964.

The TelePrompTer Corporation was founded in the 1950s by Fred Barton Jr., Hubert Schlafly and Irving Berlin Kahn. Barton was an actor who suggested the concept of the teleprompter as a means of assisting television performers who had to memorize large amounts of material in a short time. Schlafly built the first teleprompter in 1950. It was simply a mechanical device, operated by a hidden technician, located near the camera. The script, in inch-high letters, was printed by a special electric typewriter on a paper scroll, which was advanced as the performer read, and the machines rented for the then-considerable sum of $30 per hour.

The teleprompter was used for the first time on December 4, 1950, in filming the CBS soap The First Hundred Years. It was used by Lucille Ball and Desi Arnaz in 1953 to read commercials on-camera. Jess Oppenheimer, who created I Love Lucy and served for its first five years as its producer and head writer, developed the first "in-the-lens" prompter and was awarded U.S. patents for its creation. His system uses a mirror to reflect a script onto a piece of glass placed in front of the camera lens, thus allowing the reader to look directly into the camera.

The producers of Dragnet estimated the use of teleprompters cut the show's production time by as much as 50% Arthur Godfrey, Raymond Massey, Cedric Hardwicke, and Helen Hayes were early users of the technology.

The technology soon became a staple of television news and is the primary system used by newscasters today.

In 1952 former President Herbert Hoover used a Schlafly-designed speech teleprompter to address the 1952 Republican National Convention in Chicago. U.S. Governor Paul A. Dever spoke at the 1952 Democratic National Convention, also held in Chicago, using a mechanical-roll teleprompter on a long pole held by a TV technician in the convention audience, while the 1952 Republican National Convention used a smaller teleprompter placed in front of the speaker's rostrum. Mechanical prompters were still being used as late as 1992.

In the early years of teleprompter use by politicians, some saw the device as cheating. in 1955, Richard L. Neuberger, a Democratic Senator from Oregon, proposed legislation that if a politician used a teleprompter the use of the device had to be noted in the speech.

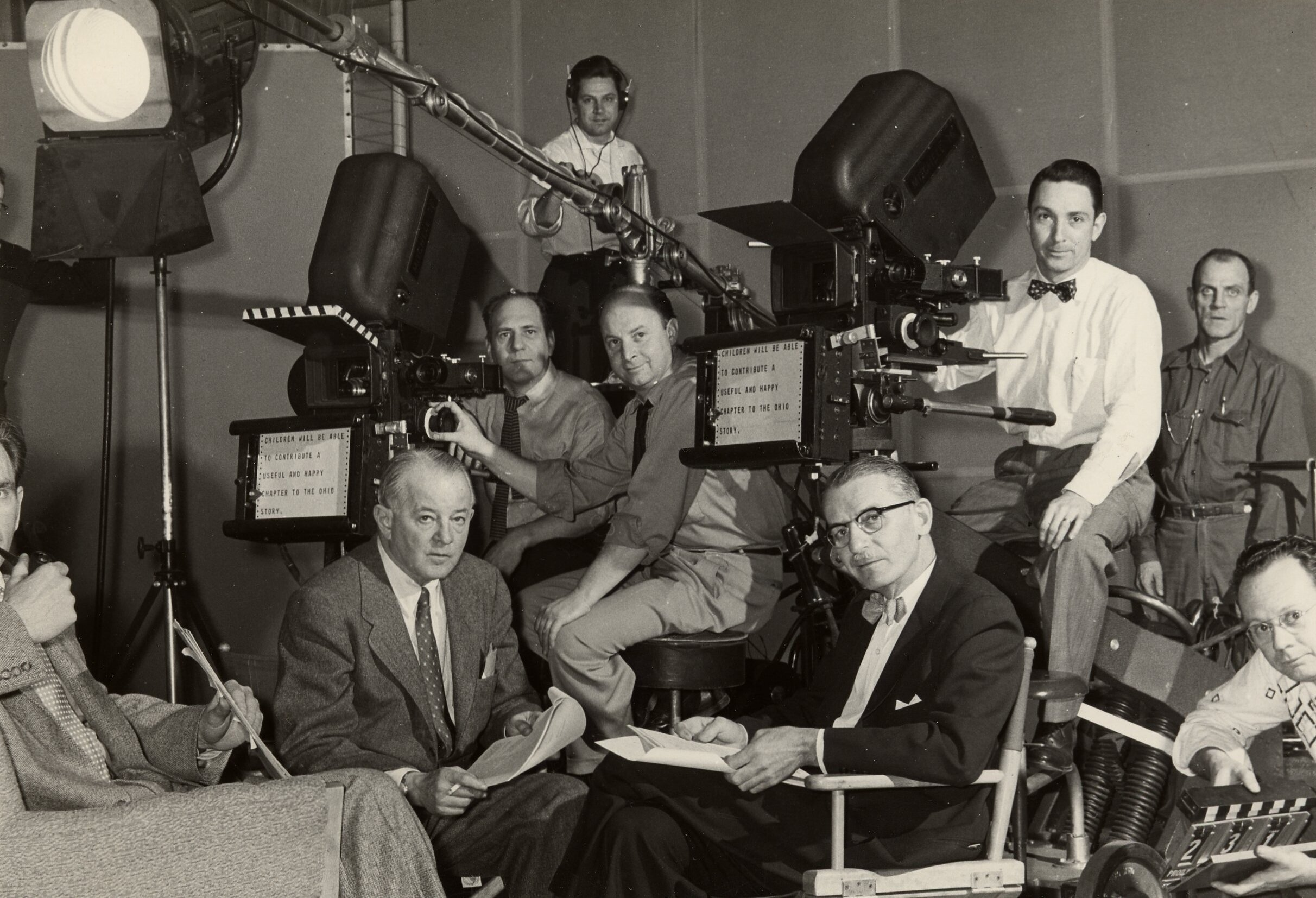
Cinécraft Productions used teleprompters extensively in their filmed made for television programs.

The new technology saw quick adoption in the sponsored film industry where cutting production costs made the difference between a film that made money and one that lost money. Cinécraft Productions was the first to advertise the availability of three-camera synchronized filming with a teleprompter when in 1954 they began to advertise their use of the new technology in Business Screen, a magazine dedicated to the sponsored film industry. Cinécraft used the technique to film the 1953–1960 weekly television series The Ohio Story. Cinécraft also used the technique for executive desk talks in the 1950s and 1960s.

On January 4, 1954, Dwight Eisenhower was the first President to use a teleprompter for a State of the Union address.

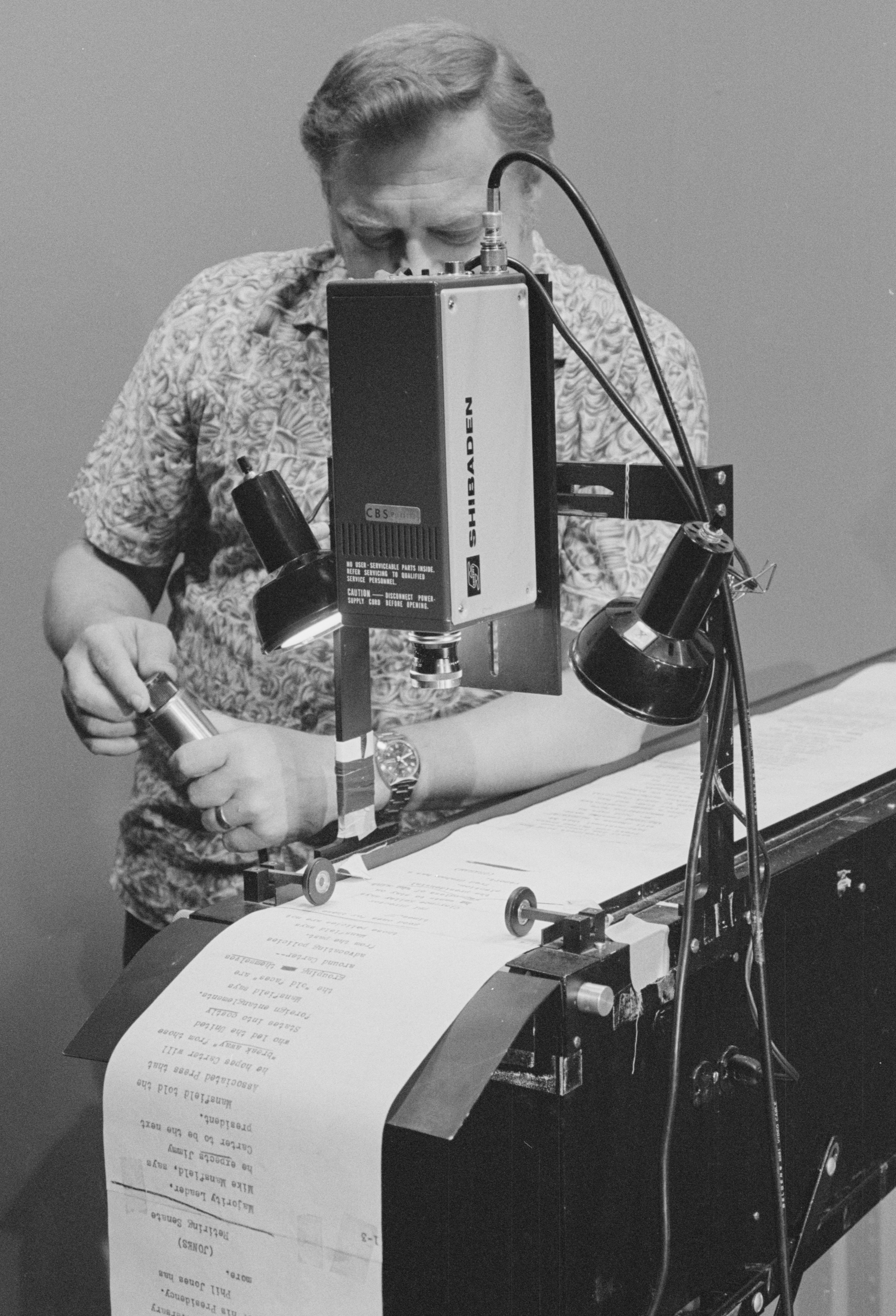
Man preparing teleprompter text for WCCO-TV in 1976

The first personal computer-based teleprompter, CompuPrompt, appeared in 1982. It was invented and marketed by Courtney M. Goodin and Laurence B. Abrams in Los Angeles, California. The custom software and specially-redesigned camera hardware ran on the Atari 800 computer, which featured smooth hardware-assisted scrolling. Their company later became ProPrompt, Inc., still in business as of 2021. Paper-based teleprompting companies Electronic Script Prompting, QTV, and Telescript followed suit and developed their own software several years later when computers powerful enough to scroll text smoothly became available. In January 2010 Compu=Prompt received a Technology and Engineering Emmy Award for "Pioneering Development in Electronic Prompting".

== Etymology ==
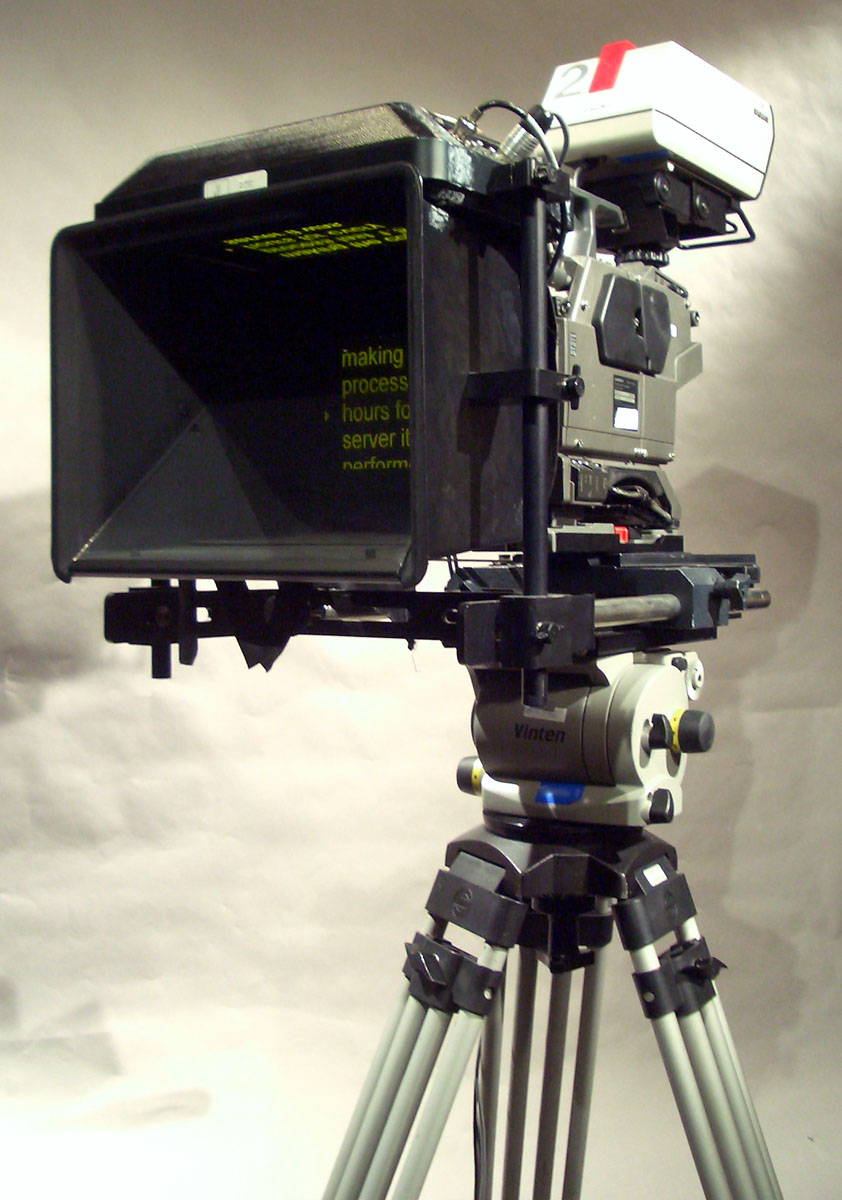
A teleprompter displaying text

The word "TelePrompTer", with internal capitalization, originated as a trade name used by the TelePrompTer Corporation, which first developed the device in the 1950s. The word "teleprompter", with no capitalization, has become a genericized trademark, because it is used to refer to similar systems manufactured by many different companies. Some other common terms for this type of device are:

- Autocue, the trademark of Autocue Group Ltd, most commonly used in Commonwealth countries
- Autoscript is used to brand the devices in the United States
- cueing device
- electronic speech notes
- idiot board (slang)
- prompter

== Modern design ==
=== Television ===
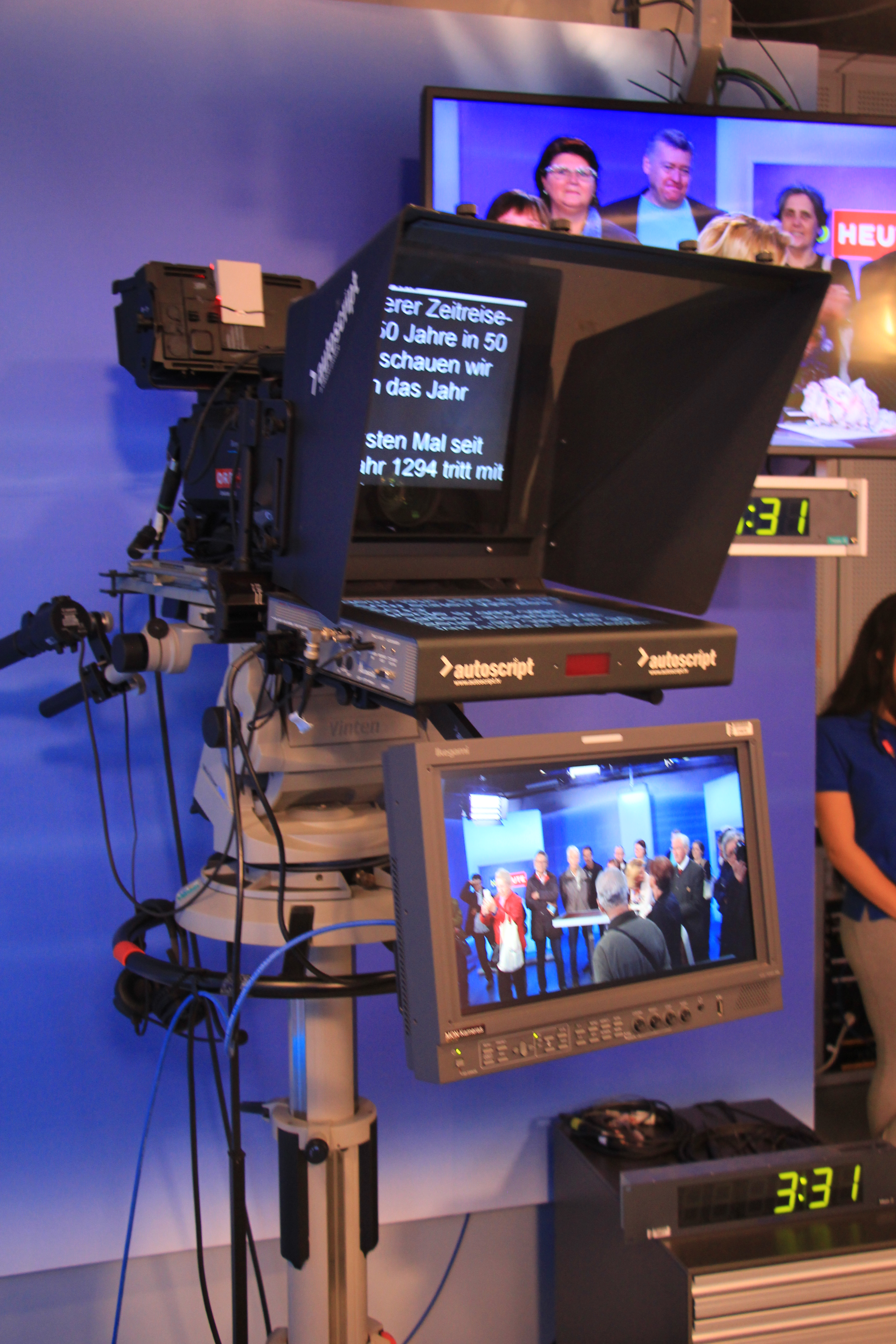
Studio camera with Autoscript teleprompter

Modern teleprompters for news programs consist of a personal computer, connected to video monitors on each professional video camera. In certain systems, the PC connects to a separate display device to offer greater flexibility in setup, distances, and cabling. The monitors are often black-and-white and have the scanning reversed to compensate for the reflection of the mirror. A peripheral device attached has a knob that can be turned to speed up, slow down, or even reverse the scrolling of the text. The text is usually displayed in white letters on a black background for the best readability, while cues are in inverse video (black on white). Difficult words (mainly international names) are spelled out phonetically, as are other particulars like "Nine-eleven" (to specify that the event 9/11 should not be pronounced "nine-one-one", for example).

With the development of teleprompter software applications, many different disciplines are now using teleprompters.

=== Presidential (or glass) teleprompters ===
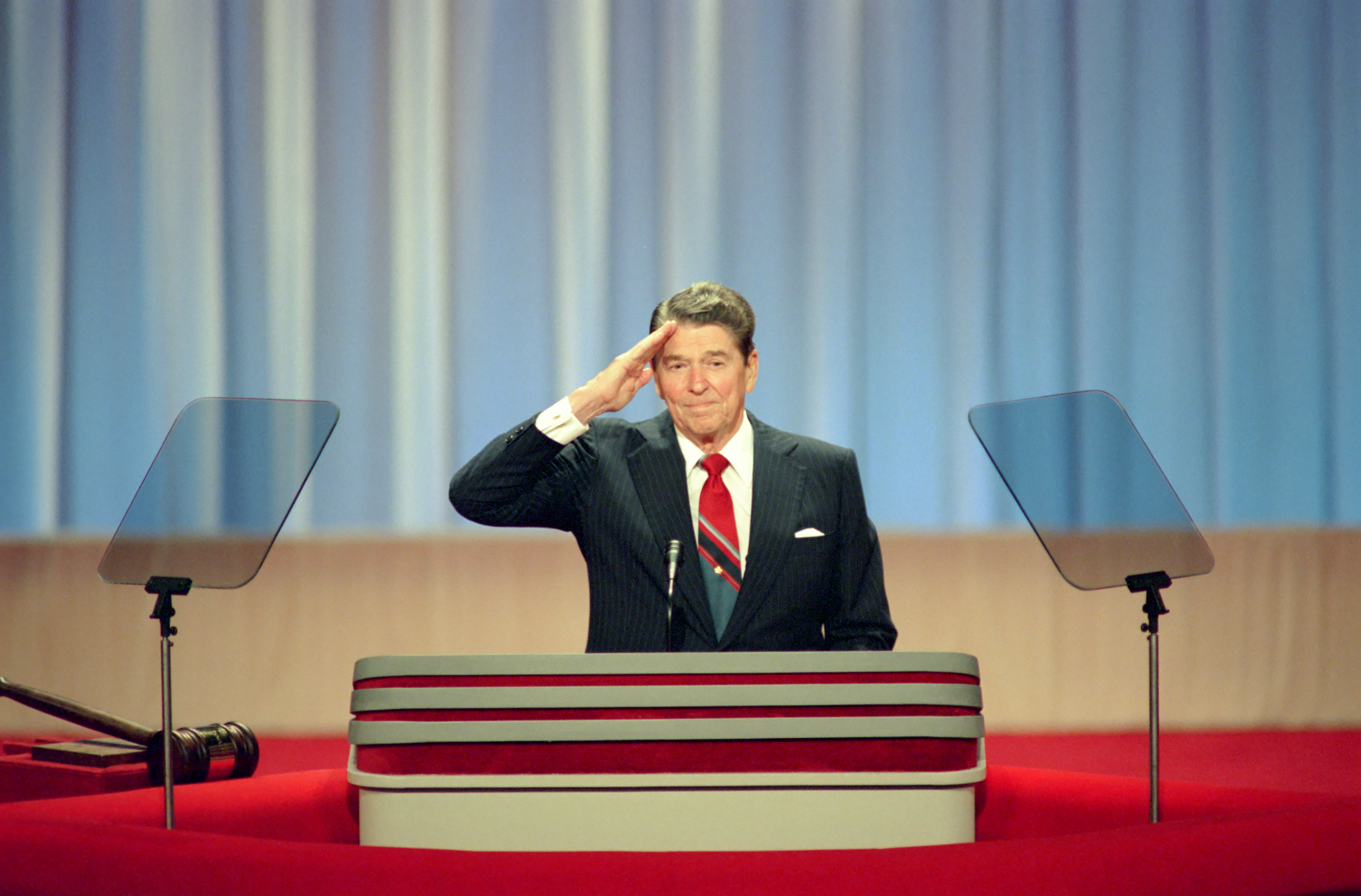
President Ronald Reagan between two reflective teleprompters in the Louisiana Superdome during the 1988 Republican National Convention

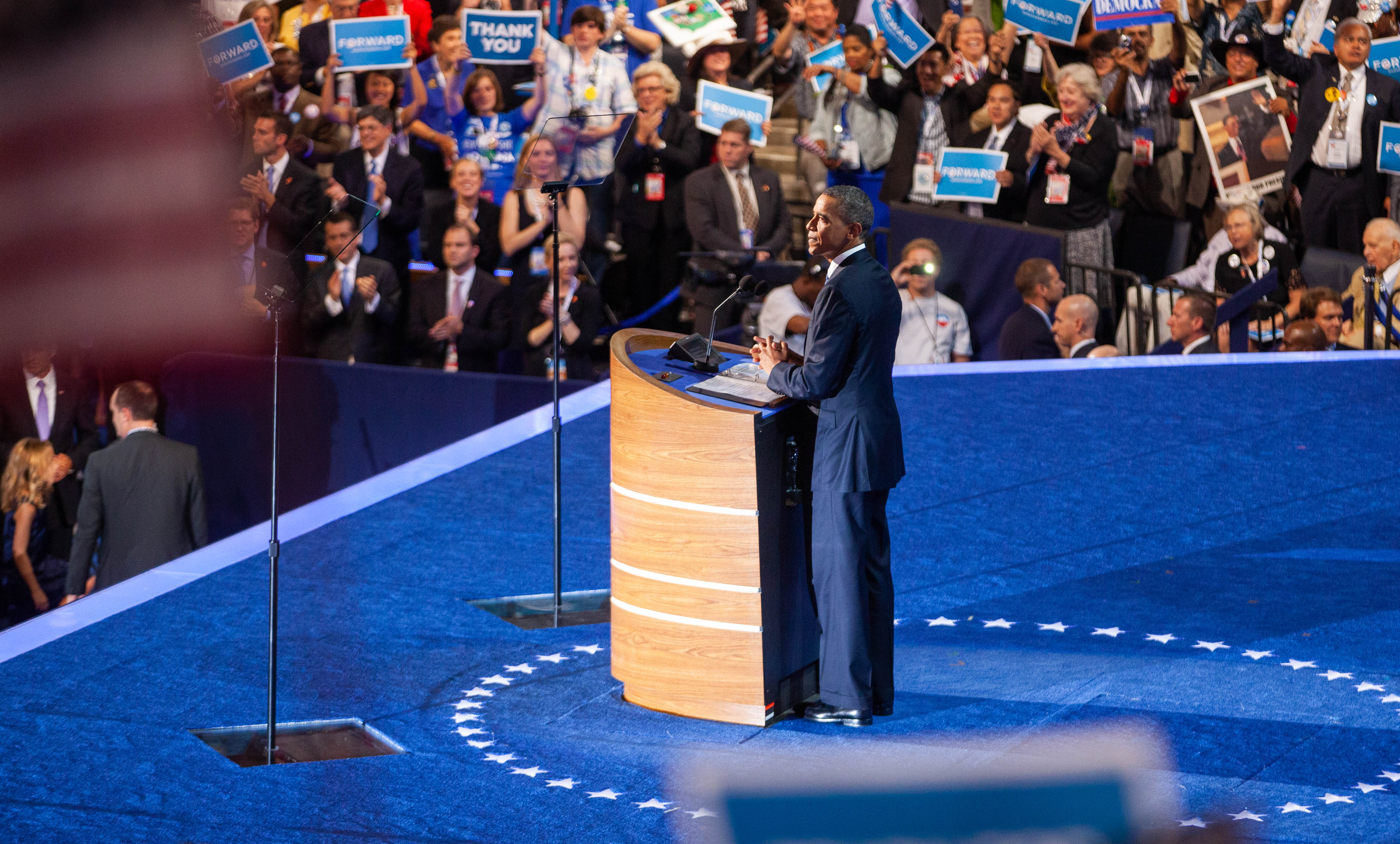
President Barack Obama in 2012, behind two teleprompters, whose monitors are embedded in the floor of the stage. Teleprompters were an issue in the 2012 United States presidential election as Republicans criticized Obama for using teleprompters.

Glass teleprompters were first used at the 1956 Democratic National Convention. The inventor of the teleprompter, Hubert Schlafly, explained that he wanted to create a less obtrusive teleprompting system than the ones used at the time. He said, "We developed a 'one-way mirror' device we called the Speech View system... The prompter, hidden in the base, reflected the text on the glass to the speaker while the audience looked through the glass without being aware of the text. Two such prompters, one on the right and one on the left of the speaker allowed him to switch from one to the other and appear to address the entire audience".

Schlafly's company then created a speaker's lectern that included two synchronized glass teleprompters and a range of technological innovations including air conditioning and an adjustable-height speaker's platform. The success of the system led the company to develop a new model for use on TV cameras, with the glass placed directly in front of the lens. The camera "looked through the glass; the performer looked directly at the TV audience and was able to read the text word for word. This device now has worldwide use".

Typically, a screen on either side of the speaker shows mirrored text from upward-facing floor monitors at the base of a stand supporting a one-way mirror at the top, angled down towards the screen. The speaker sees the text on the screen reflected in the mirror, while the audience sees what looks like a sheet of tinted glass on each side of the speaker.

Schlafly's glass teleprompters were also used for the 1956 Republican National Convention, and at both parties' conventions from then on. In 1964, glass teleprompters were used by Robert F. Kennedy, at the time the Attorney General, who served in both the Kennedy and early Johnson Administrations (1961–1964), to deliver his convention speech.

=== Confidence monitors ===
In 1996, for the first time, speakers at the Democratic National Convention, held at the United Center in Chicago, Illinois, used a four-teleprompter system: as can be seen at another convention in image (A), the first three prompters are placed to the left, right and in front of the speaker, the latter embedded within the speaker's lectern, enabling the speaker to look down at the lectern without losing their place in the text of the speech; while in image (B), the fourth prompter is a large confidence monitor located immediately below the lenses of the TV broadcast cameras, at a distance of several meters/yards from the speaker.

This modification to the traditional two-teleprompter set-up continues to be in use at both the Democratic and Republican parties' national conventions: the two glass teleprompters on either side of the speaker's lectern create the illusion that the speaker is looking directly at the audience in the hall, the monitor embedded in the lectern, together with the fourth, much larger teleprompter screen, known as a "confidence monitor", placed immediately below the broadcast TV cameras which are located some distance away from the convention stage on a specially-constructed broadcasting gantry. This placement of the center prompter creates the illusion that the speaker is periodically looking straight into the camera lens and thereby appears to directly address the TV audience watching the televised Convention coverage.

In 2006, speakers at the Liberal Democrat Conference, held at the Brighton Centre in Brighton, UK, also used a three-screen system (but this time consisting entirely of large off-stage confidence monitors mounted on poles—which are often described outside North America, together with glass teleprompters, as "autocues"), where the skill required for those using it, according to the Liberal Democrats' former leader, Menzies Campbell (2006–2008), is to move their gaze seamlessly from one screen to the other: left, center (near the broadcast TV cameras), right and then back again.

As well as helping the speaker to appear to sometimes directly address the TV audience during his or her speech, this system allows the speaker—in another case cited, the party's then-new leader, Nick Clegg (2008–2015)—to abandon the podium lectern and roam the stage, speaking with apparent spontaneity but in fact constantly assisted by three large autocue screens placed throughout the conference hall. Ironically, this use of the system was adopted by Clegg to counter the oratorical success of another party leader, David Cameron (later to become British Prime Minister), who bestrode stages while speaking seemingly off-the-cuff, having memorized key parts of his speech.

This use of multiple off-stage confidence monitors also dispenses with the need for glass teleprompters to be present on the conference stage, thereby reducing "stage clutter", and removing the inevitable restrictions on the speaker's movement and field of vision imposed by on-stage glass prompters. The disadvantage of such a system is that the provision of "giant teleprompters" becomes essential to maintaining the illusion of speaking with apparent spontaneity.

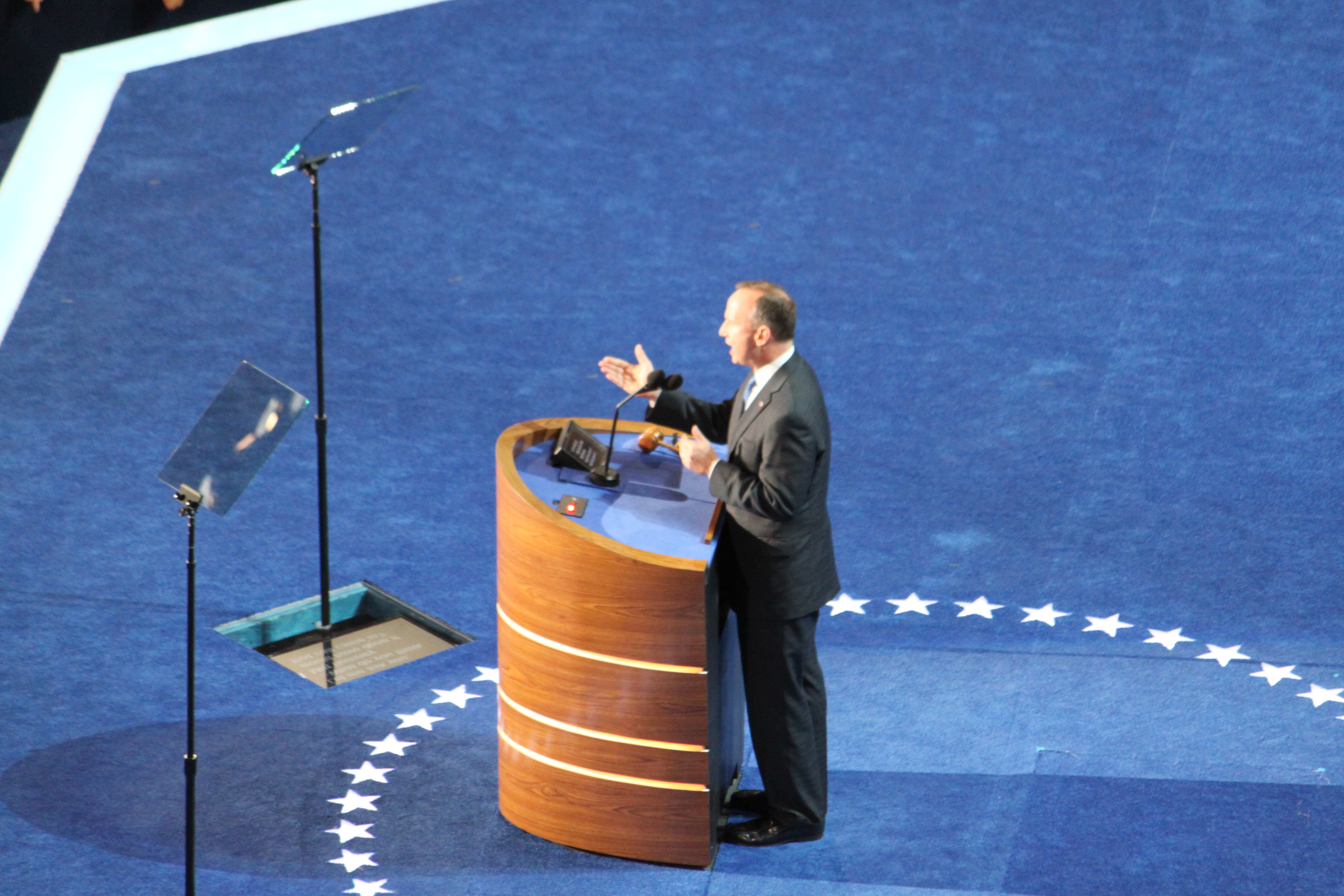
(A) The first three teleprompters: A monitor screen partly embedded in the lectern's desktop displays the scrolling text of the speech in synchrony with two screens embedded in the podium floor. They are on either side of the speaker, reflected by the angled glass teleprompters above them.

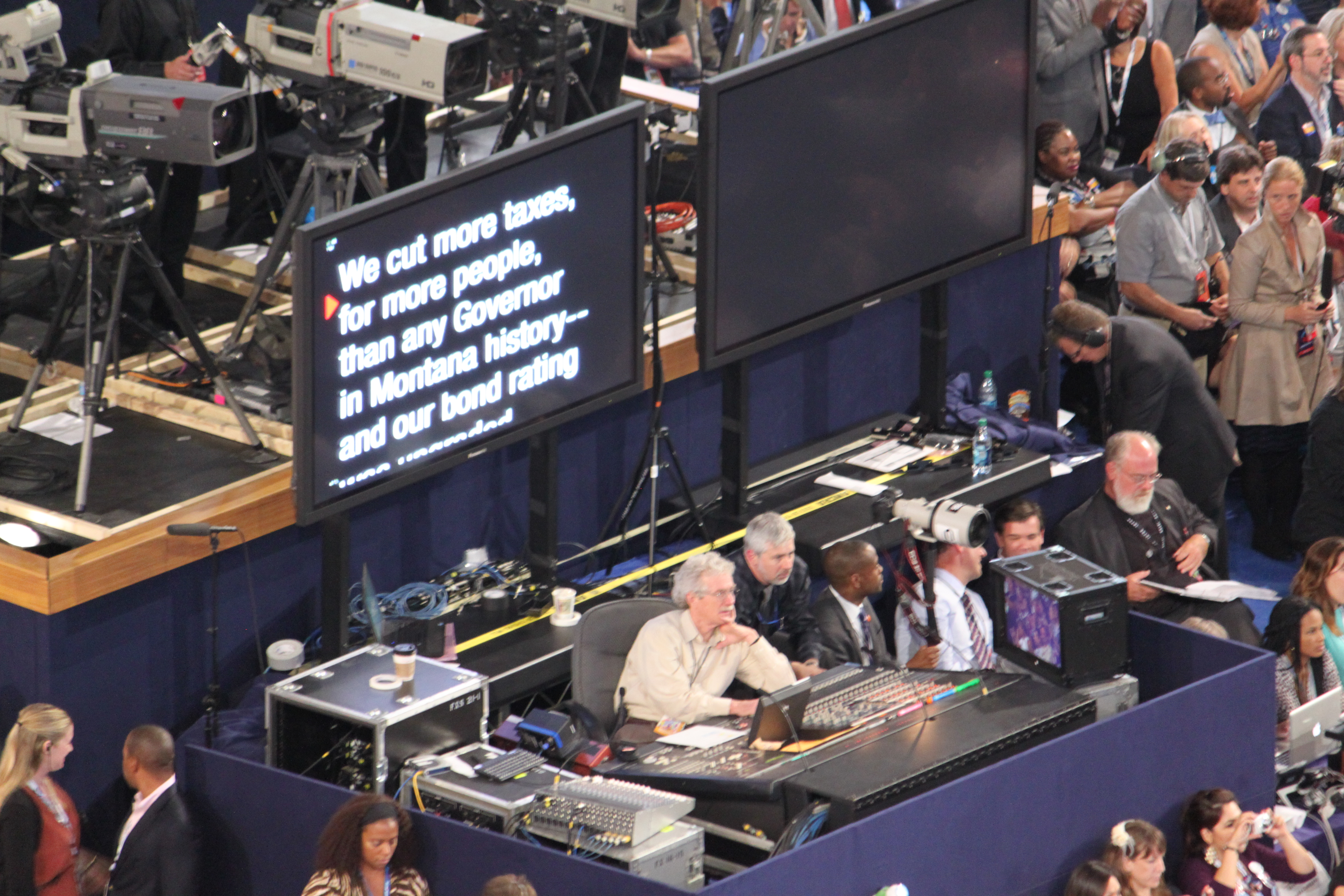
(B) The fourth teleprompter: A large confidence monitor displays the scrolling text of the speech immediately below the lenses of the broadcast TV cameras, several meters/feet away from the speaker.

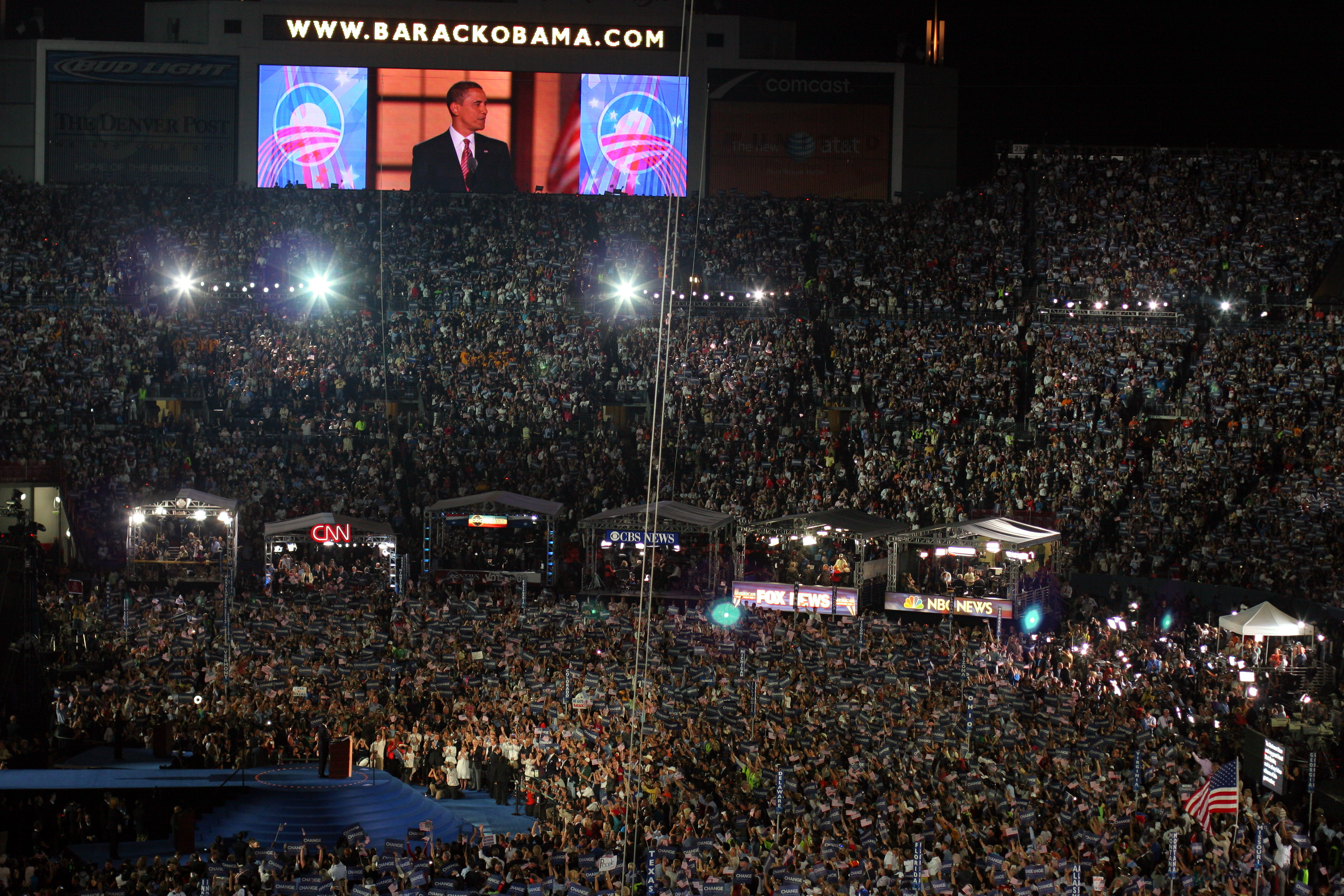
(C) The above-described four-teleprompter set-up in use at the 2008 Democratic National Convention in Denver, Colorado, USA (The large confidence monitor under the TV cameras is near the bottom far right of this frame.).

== Gallery ==
Various types of modern teleprompter:

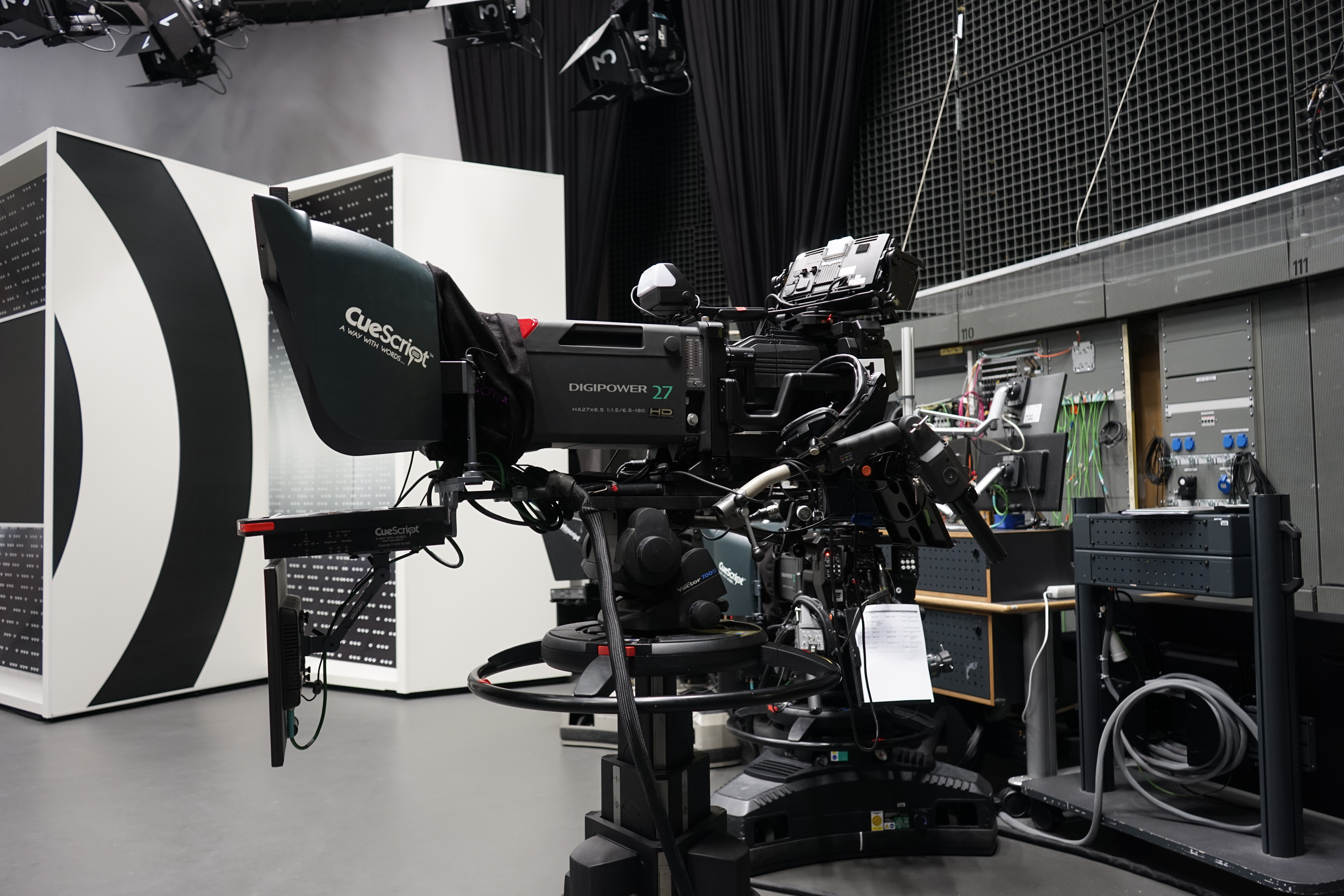
TV camera at ZDF in the nano studio

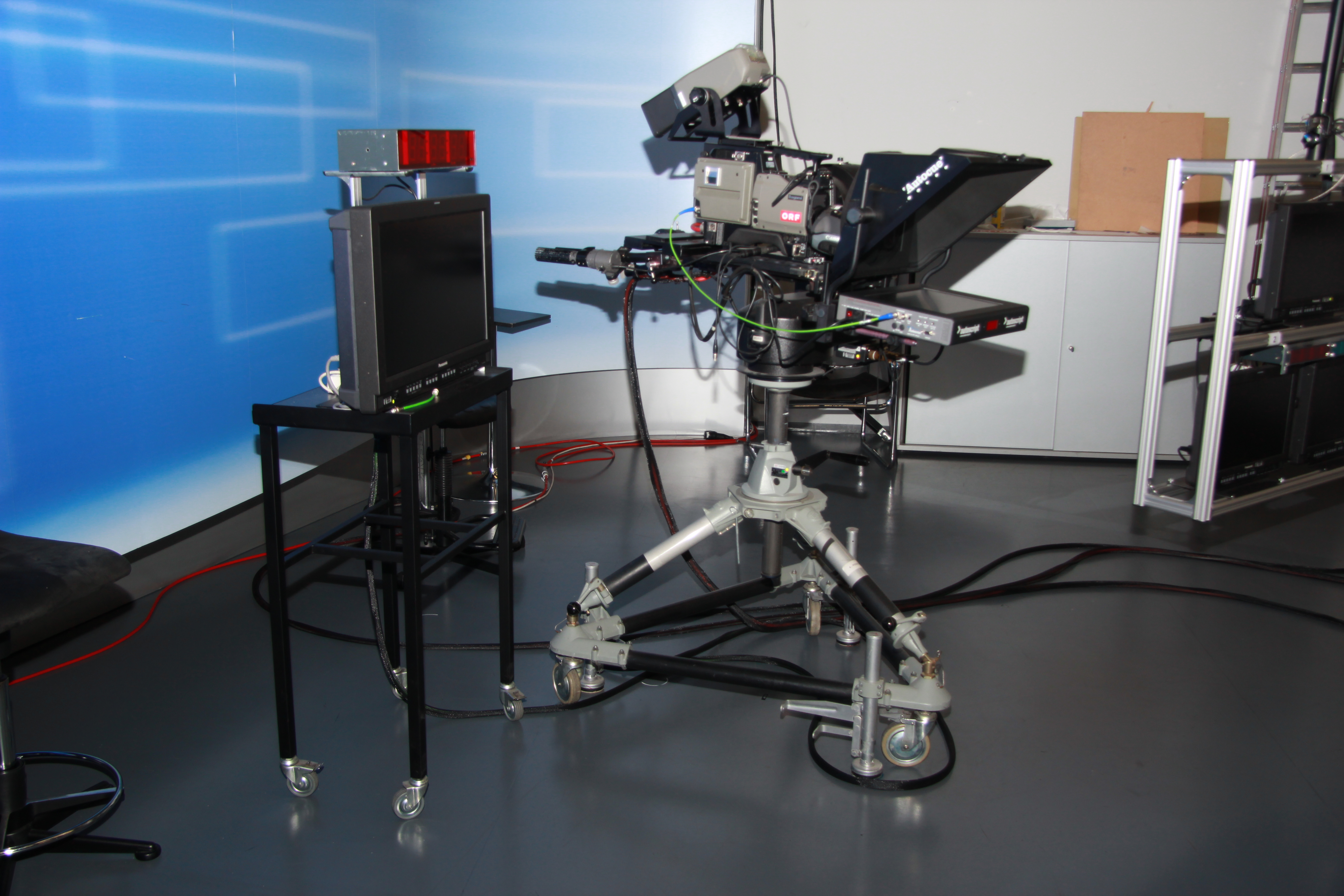
ORF broadcasting studio of Salzburg Today (Bundesland Heute)

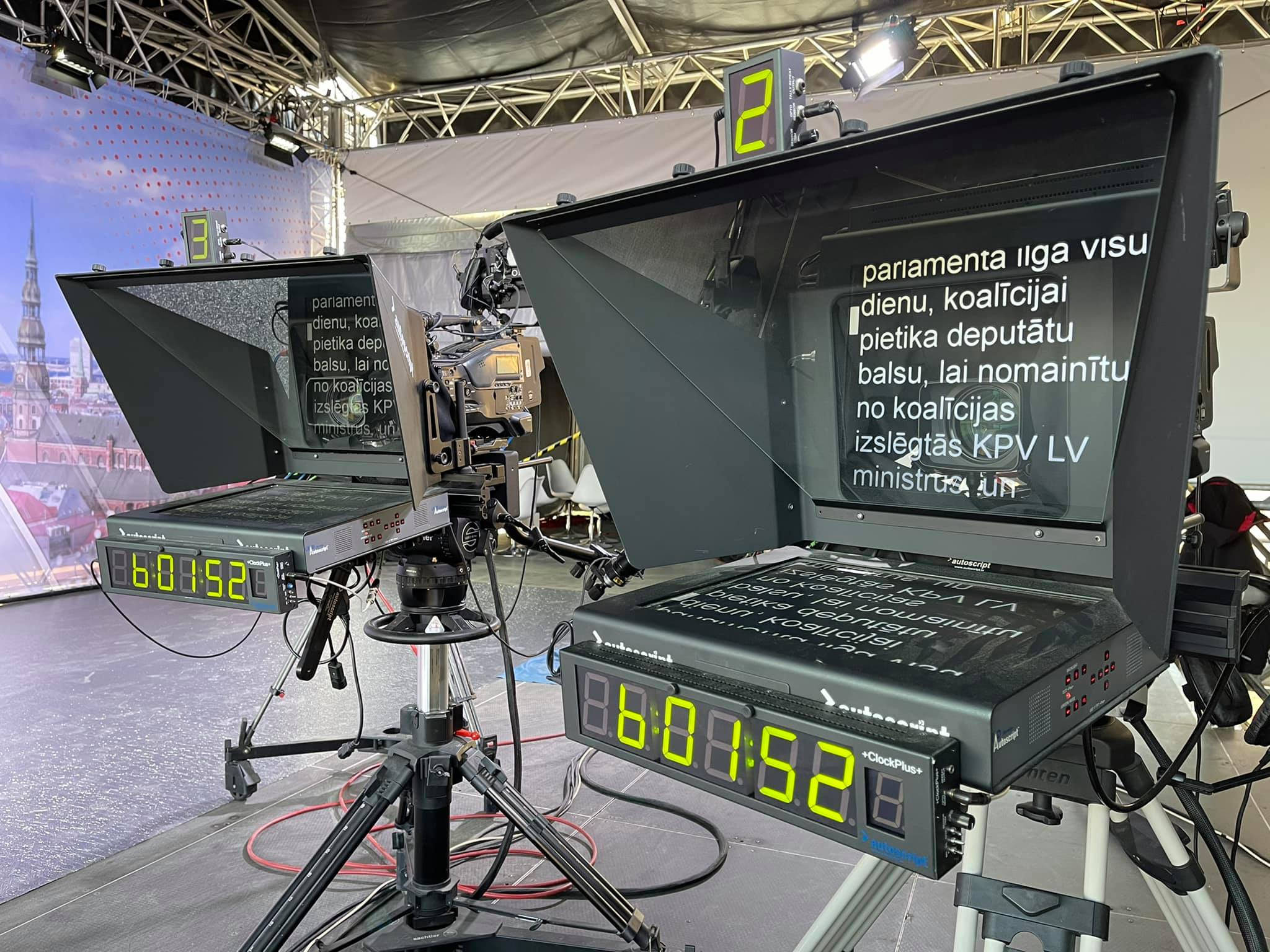
Two teleprompters at Latvian Television

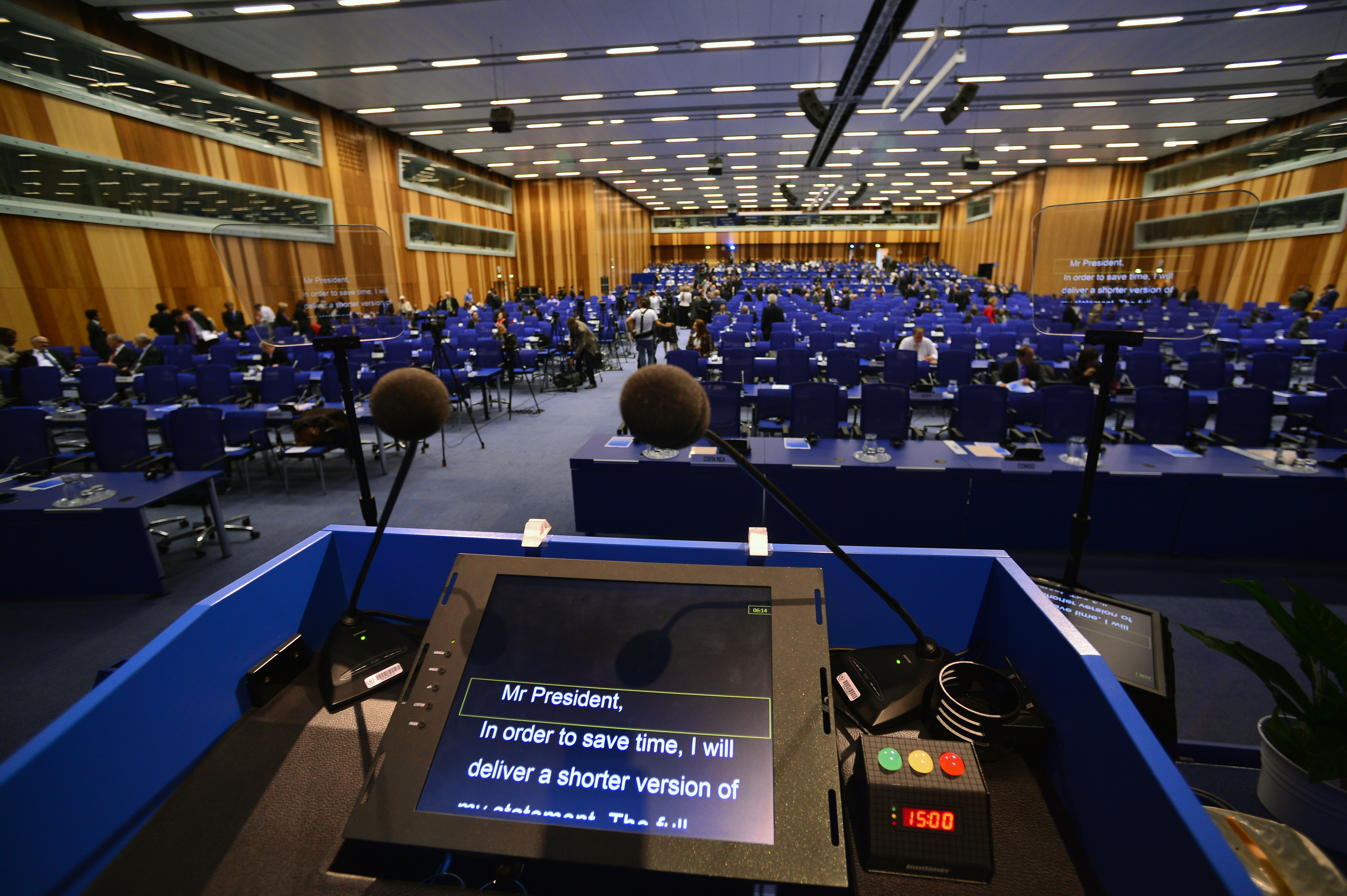
Teleprompter glass on left and right from speaker's point of view

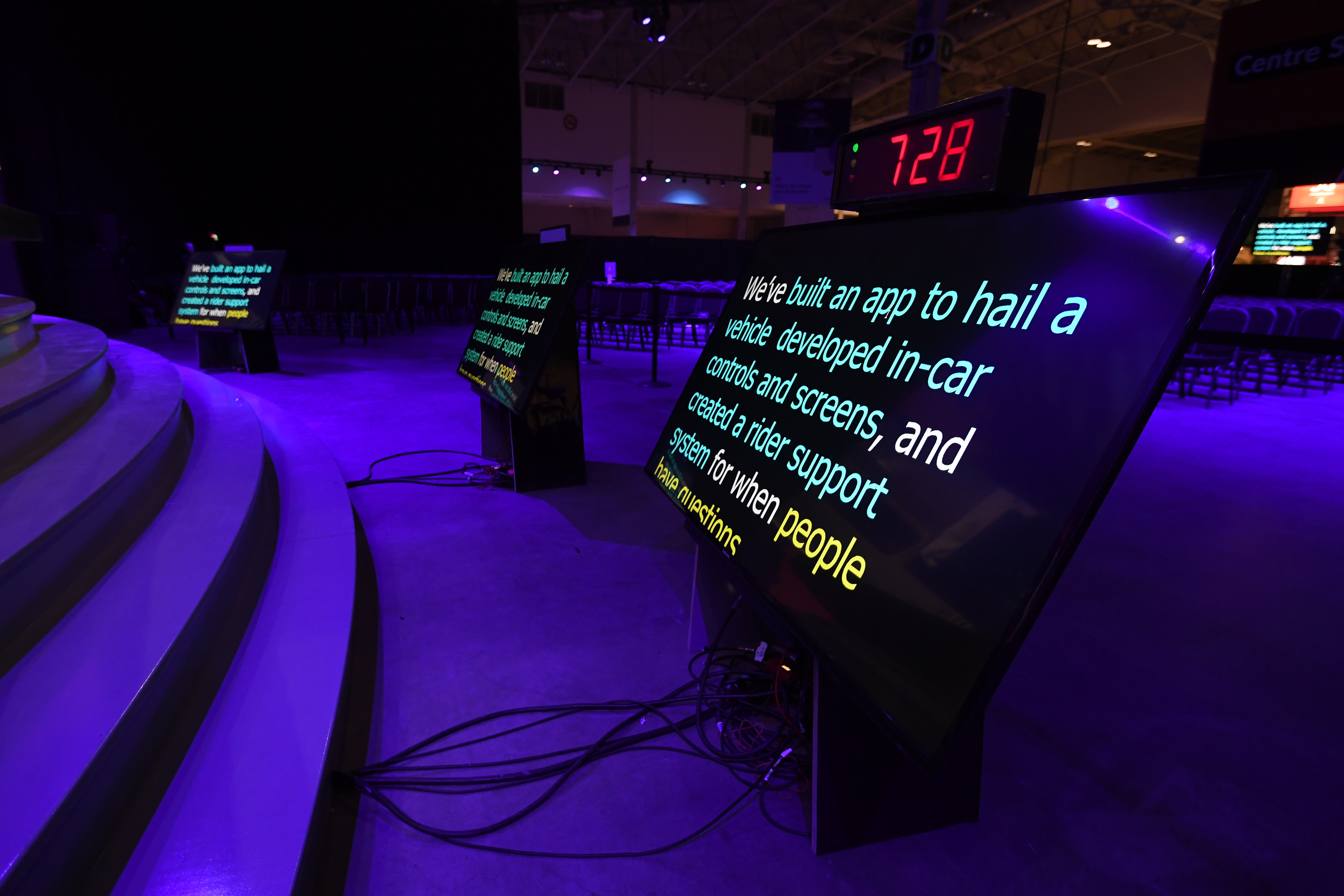
Three teleprompters near a stage

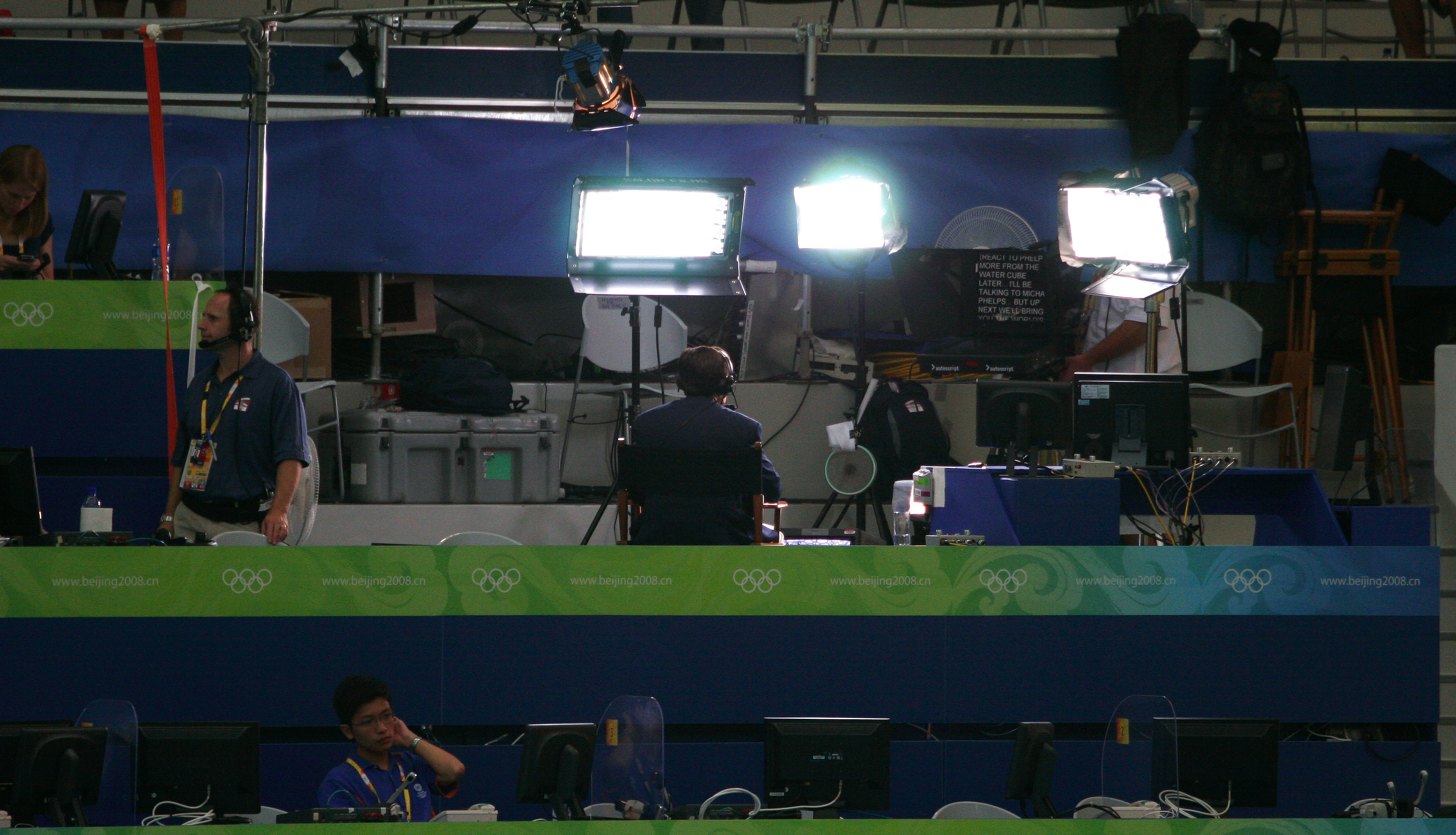
Teleprompter used during NBC Sports coverage of 2008 Olympics

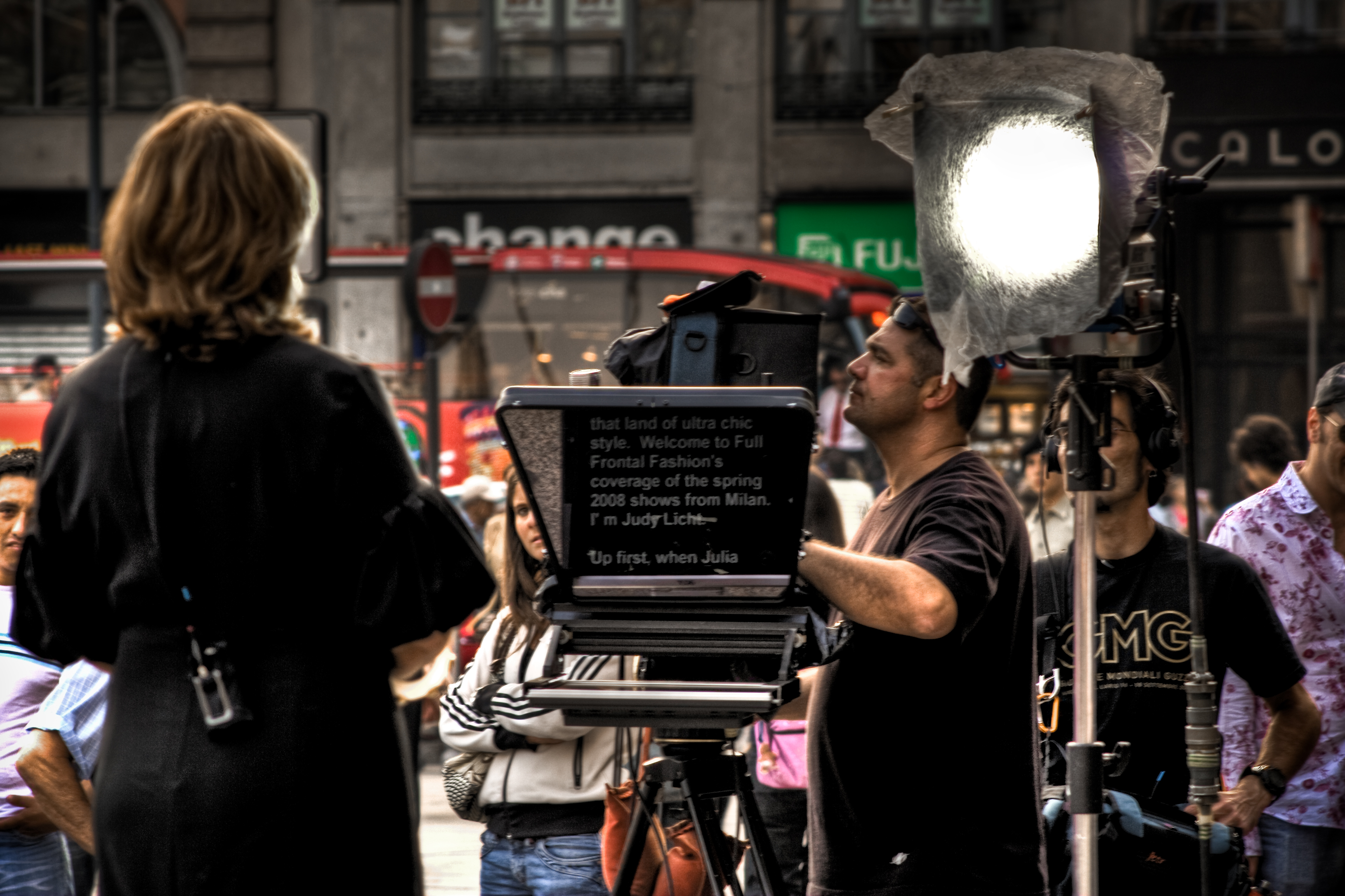
Teleprompter in use

== See also ==
- Cue card
- Interrotron, a similar device displaying a live image of an interviewer or interviewee instead of text, allowing both to look straight at the camera
