= List of Heroes of the Soviet Union (N) =

The Hero of the Soviet Union was the highest distinction of the Soviet Union. It was awarded 12,775 times. Due to the large size of the list, it has been broken up into multiple pages.

- Vali Nabievich Nabiev (ru)
- Pyotr Porfirievich Naboychenko (ru)
- Ivan Savelyevich Naborsky (ru)
- Mikhail Alekseevich Navrotsky (ru)
- Mikhail Karpovich Navrotsky (ru)
- Epifan Ivanovich Nagaev (ru)
- Nikolai Anisimovich Nagibin
- Dmitry Vasilyevich Nagirnyak (ru)
- Semyon Markovich Nagnibeda (ru)
- Pimen Nikolaevich Nagovitsin (ru)
- Viktor Sergeyevich Nagorny (ru)
- Mikahil Petrovich Nagorny (ru)
- Martiros Karapetovich Nagulyan (ru)
- Daylyagay Siraevich Nagumanov (ru)
- Pyotr Filippovich Nadezhdin (ru)
- Fyodor Alekseevich Nadezhdin (ru)
- Gerasim Martemyanovich Nadezhdin (ru)
- Ivan Petrovich Nadyon (ru)
- Georgy Mefodievich Nadtocheev (ru)
- Ivan Ivanovich Nadtochy (ru)
- Mikhail Ivanovich Naduty (ru)
- Aleksandr Konstantinovich Nazarenko (ru)
- Vladimir Afanasyevich Nazarenko (ru)
- Dmitry Pavlovich Nazarenko (ru)
- Nikolai Nikolaevich Nazarenko (ru)
- Pavel Ivanovich Nazarenko (ru)
- Pyotr Danilovich Nazarenko (ru)
- Yakov Isaevich Nazarenko (ru)
- Vladimir Zakharovich Nazarkin (ru)
- Aleksandr Aleksandrovich Nazarov
- Aleksandr Maksimovich Nazarov (ru)
- Aleksandr Petrovich Nazarov (ru)
- Aleksey Prokopevich Nazarov (ru)
- Aleksey Timofeevich Nazarov (ru)
- Ivan Mikhailovich Nazarov (ru)
- Ilya Semyonovich Nazarov (ru)
- Konstantin Aleksandrovich Nazarov (ru)
- Tuychi Nazarov (ru)
- Klavdiya Ivanovna Nazarova
- Georgy Andreevich Nazarev (ru)
- Konstantin Savelevich Nazimov (ru)
- Nikolai Ignatevich Nazimov (ru)
- Ivan Grigorievich Nazimok (ru)
- Ivan Ilyich Nazin (ru)
- Vasily Mikhailovich Naydenko (ru)
- Grigory Artyomovich Naydenko (ru)
- Ivan Antonovich Naydenko (ru)
- Nikolai Alekseevich Naydenov
- Grigory Nikolaevich Naydin (ru)
- Aleksandr Georgievich Nakonechikov (ru)
- Anatoly Gavrilovich Nakonechny (ru)
- Ján Nálepka
- Vladimir Georgievich Nalivaiko (ru)
- Grigory Sergeyevich Nalimov (ru)
- Sergey Venediktovich Nalimov (ru)
- Vladimir Vardenovich Naneyshvili (ru)
- Boris Stanislavovich Narbut (ru)
- Mikhail Nikolaevich Nargan (ru)
- Vladimir Aleksandrovich Narzhimsky (ru)
- Deonisy Silvestrovich Narutsky (ru)
- Gafar Nazarovich Nasardinov (ru)
- Gamal Abdel Nasser
- Ivan Moiseevich Natarov (ru)
- Viktor Petrovich Naumenko (ru)
- Ivan Afansyevich Naumenko (ru)
- Stepan Ivanovich Naumenko
- Yuri Andreevich Naumenko (ru)
- Aleksey Fyodorovich Naumov
- Vasily Mikhailovich Naumov (ru)
- Vasily Nikolaevich Naumov (ru)
- Georgy Vasilyevich Naumov (ru)
- Ilya Yegorovich Naumov (ru)
- Kondraty Ivanovich Naumov (ru)
- Mikhail Ivanovich Naumov (ru)
- Nikolai Aleksandrovich Naumov (ru)
- Pyotr Izotovich Naumov (ru)
- Nikolai Kuzmich Naumchik (ru)
- Inayat Nauruzbaev (ru)
- Khamit Akhmetovich Neatbakov (ru)
- Nikolai Grigorievich Nevgodovsky (ru)
- Aleksandr Vasilyevich Nevdakhin (ru)
- Vladimir Lavrentyevich Neverov (ru)
- Andrey Ivanovich Nevzgodov (ru)
- Georgy Terentyevich Nevkipely (ru)
- Nikolai Timofeevich Nevpryaga (ru)
- Nikolai Arsentevich Nevsky (ru)
- Aleksey Ignatevich Negoda (ru)
- Vasily Ivanovich Nedbaev (ru)
- Anatoly Konstantinovich Nedbaylo
- Ivan Makarovich Nedvizhay (ru)
- Mitrofan Ivanovich Nedelin
- Iosif Markovich Nedzvetsky (ru)
- Leonid Vasilyevich Nedogibchenko (ru)
- Viktor Leontevich Nedogovorov (ru)
- Konstantin Iosifovich Nedorubov (ru)
- Veniamin Georgievich Nedoshivin (ru)
- Pavel Gurevich Nezhivenko (ru)
- Ivan Lukich Nezhigay (ru)
- Valentin Stepan Nezhnov (ru)
- Kuzma Pavlovich Nezdoly (ru)
- Aleksey Tarasovich Neznakin (ru)
- Valentin Leonidovich Neklyudov (ru)
- Aleksandr Stepanovich Nekrasov (ru)
- Andrey Akimovich Nekrasov (ru)
- Vasily Aleksandrovich Nekrasov (ru)
- Vladimir Petrovich Nekrasov (ru)
- Dmitry Fyodorovich Nekrasov (ru)
- Ivan Mikhailovich Nekrasov (ru)
- Leopold Borisovich Nekrasov (ru)
- Nikolai Vasilyevich Nekrasov (ru)
- Fyodor Gavrilovich Nelidov (ru)
- Ivan Yakovlevich Nelyubin (ru)
- Yakov Nikolaevich Nelyubin (ru)
- Vasily Grigorievich Nelyubov (ru)
- Stepan Alekseevich Nemenko (ru)
- Nikolai Nikolaevich Nemirovsky (ru)
- Aleksey Vladimirovich Nemkov
- Ivan Andreevich Nemkov (ru)
- Ivan Fyodorovich Nemkov (ru)
- Akim Andreevich Nemtinov (ru)
- Ivan Konstantinovich Nemudry (ru)
- Ivan Spiridonovich Nemtsev (ru)
- Semyon Ivanovich Nemtsev (ru)
- Samson Mikhailovich Nemchenok (ru)
- Vladimir Ivanovich Nemchikov (ru)
- Aleksandr Mikhailovich Nemchinov (ru)
- Ivan Nikolaevich Nemchinov (ru)
- Mikhail Antonovich Nemchinov (ru)
- Mikhail Grigorievich Nepomnyashy (ru)
- Ilya Kirillovich Nepochatykh (ru)
- Ivan Borisovich Nepochelovich (ru)
- Pavel Markovich Nepryakhin (ru)
- Vladimir Ivanovich Nesvetaylov (ru)
- Timofey Yegorovich Nesgovorov (ru)
- Grigory Ivanovich Nesmashny (ru)
- Grigory Karpovich Nesterenko (ru)
- Daniil Potapovich Nesterenko (ru)
- Dmitry Akimovich Nesterenko (ru)
- Ivan Maksimovich Nesterenko (ru)
- Pavel Antonovich Nesterenko (ru)
- Fyodor Grigorievich Nesterenko (ru)
- Vladimir Fyodorovich Nesterov (sergeant) (ru)
- Vladimir Fyodorovich Nesterov (general) (ru)
- Ivan Naumovich Nesterov (ru)
- Ivan Nesterovich Nesterov (ru)
- Ivan Firsovich Nesterov (ru)
- Igor Konstantinovich Nesterov (ru)
- Pyotr Andreevich Nesterov (ru)
- Sergey Yegorovich Nesterov (ru)
- Stepan Kuzmich Nesterov (ru)
- Pavel Vladimirovich Nesterovich (ru)
- Nikolai Semyonovich Nesterovsky (ru)
- Vasily Ulyanovich Netyosov (ru)
- Erdenbek Netkaliev (ru)
- Vasily Gavrilovich Netreba (ru)
- Yakov Nikolaevich Neumoev (ru)
- Vladimir Andreevich Neupokoev (ru)
- Stepan Andreevich Neustroev
- Ivan Pavlovich Neustruev (ru)
- Anatoly Ivanovich Nefyodov (ru)
- Vasily Fyodorovich Nefyodov (ru)
- Vladimir Andreevich Nefyodov (ru)
- Pyotr Prokhorovich Nefyodov (ru)
- Mikhail Konstantinovich Nekhaev (ru)
- Stepan Yakovlevich Nekhaenko (ru)
- Daut Eredzhibovich Nekhay (ru)
- Arsenty Alekseevich Nechaev (ru)
- Vasily Grigorievich Nechaev (ru)
- Viktor Nikolaevich Nechaev (ru)
- Vyacheslav Filippovich Nechaev (ru)
- Ivan Pavlovich Nechaev (ru)
- Mikhail Yefimovich Nechaev (ru)
- Stepan Afanasyevich Nechay (ru)
- Vasily Ivanovich Nechval (ru)
- Ivan Ivanovich Nechipurenko (ru)
- Nikolai Gavrilovich Nechipurenko (ru)
- Sergey Vasilyevich Nechipurenko (ru)
- Nikolai Zakharovich Neshkov (ru)
- Vasily Ivanovich Nibylitsa (ru)
- Gafiyat Yarmukhametovich Nigmatullin (ru)
- Filipp Trofimovich Nizhurin (ru)
- Aleksandr Mikhailovich Nikandrov (ru)
- Vasily Nikandrovich Nikandrov (ru)
- Anna Alekseevna Nikandrova
- Mikhail Ivanovich Nikanorov (ru)
- Semyon Ivanovich Nikin (ru)
- Vasily Lavrentyevich Nikitenko (ru)
- Grigory Yevseevich Nikitenko (ru)
- Nikolai Mikhailovich Nikitenko (ru)
- Aleksandr Aleksandrovich Nikitin (ru)
- Aleksandr Semyonovich Nikitin (ru)
- Aleksey Ivanovich Nikitin (ru)
- Arseny Pavlovich Nikitin (ru)
- Vasily Afansaievich Nikitin (ru)
- Vasily Varfolomeevich Nikitin (ru)
- Vasily Yegorovich Nikitin (ru)
- Vasily Mikhailovich Nikitin (ru)
- Viktor Petrovich Nikitin (ru)
- Ivan Moiseevich Nikitin (ru)
- Ivan Nikitich Nikitin (ru)
- Mikhail Yegorovich Nikitin (ru)
- Mikhail Fyodorovich Nikitin (ru)
- Nikolai Aleksandrovich Nikitin (ru)
- Nikolai Alekseevich Nikitin (ru)
- Nikolai Nikitich Nikitin (ru)
- Stepan Andreevich Nikitin (ru)
- Fyodor Prokofievich Nikitin (ru)
- Fyodor Fyodorovich Nikitin (ru)
- Aleksey Timofeevich Nikitkin (ru)
- Ivan Moiseevich Nikitchenko (ru)
- Nikita Vasilyevich Nikitchenko (ru)
- Aleksey Fyodorovich Nikiforov (ru)
- Vladimir Ivanovich Nikiforov (ru)
- Ivan Yakovlevich Nikiforov (ru)
- Konstantin Stepanovich Nikiforov (ru)
- Pyotr Pavlovich Nikiforov (ru)
- Stepan Nikiforovich Nikiforov (ru)
- Mikhail Dmitrievich Nikishin (ru)
- Vladimir Vladimirovich Nikishov (ru)
- Nikolai Tarasovich Nikovsky (ru)
- Aleksandr Petrovich Nikolaev
- Alexander Fyodorovich Nikolaev (ru)
- Aleksey Grigorevich Nikolaev (ru)
- Aleksey Mikhailovich Nikolaev (ru)
- Andriyan Grigorievich Nikolaev
- Vasily Nikolaevich Nikolaev (ru)
- Vasily Semyonovich Nikolaev (ru)
- Vladimir Nikolaevich Nikolaev (ru)
- Vladimir Romanovich Nikolaev (ru)
- Georgy Georgievich Nikolaev (ru)
- Dmitry Semyonovich Nikolaev (ru)
- Yevgeny Dmitrievich Nikolayev
- Ivan Aleksandrovich Nikolaev (ru)
- Ivan Nikolaevich Nikolaev (ru)
- Ivan Stefanovich Nikolaev (ru)
- Mikhail Arkhipovich Nikolaev (ru)
- Mikhail Vasilyevich Nikolaev (ru)
- Nikolai Ivanovich Nikolaev (ru)
- Nikolai Mikhailovich Nikolaev (ru)
- Sergey Grigorievich Nikolaev (ru)
- Aleksandr Nikolaevich Nikolaenko (ru)
- Vladimir Mironovich Nikolaenko (ru)
- Yevgeny Makarovich Nikolaenko (ru)
- Ivan Dementevich Nikolaenko (ru)
- Nikolai Mefodievich Nikolaenko (ru)
- Pyotr Ivanovich Nikolaenko (ru)
- Roman Stepanovich Nikolaenko (ru)
- Aleksandr Ignatyevich Nikolaenkov (ru)
- Igor Dmitrievich Nikolaenkov (ru)
- Pavel Fyodorovich Nikolenko (ru)
- Stepan Mikhailovich Nikolenko (ru)
- Nikolai Sergeyevich Nikolsky (ru)
- Nikolai Leontyevich Nikolchuk (ru)
- Timofey Ivanovich Nikonenko (ru)
- Yakov Tikhonovich Nikonenko (ru)
- Aleksey Vasilyevich Nikonov (ru)
- Andrey Grigorievich Nikonov (ru)
- Yevgeny Aleksandrovich Nikonov
- Ivan Yakovlevich Nikonov (ru)
- Konstantin Pavlovich Nikonov (ru)
- Nikolai Andreevich Nikonov (ru)
- Nikolai Pavlovich Nikonov (ru)
- Yakov Vasilyevich Nikonov (ru)
- Pyotr Mikhailovich Nikonorov (ru)
- Dmitry Yegorovich Nikulin (ru)
- Yegor Iosifovich Nikulin (ru)
- Pavel Yefimovich Nikulin (ru)
- Pyotr Ivanovich Nikulin (ru)
- Yevdokiya Andreyevna Nikulina
- Ivan Konstantinovich Nikulnikov (ru)
- Sergey Fyodorovich Nilovsky (ru)
- Yefim Maksimovich Nikhaev (ru)
- Aleksey Petrovich Nichepurenko (ru)
- Tachmamed Niyazmamedov (ru)
- Vasily Lukich Novak (ru)
- Terenty Fyodorovich Novak (ru)
- Nikolai Petrovich Novak (ru)
- Aleksandr Aleksandrovich Novikov
- Aleksandr Alekseevich Novikov (ru)
- Aleksandr Vasilyevich Novikov (ru)
- Aleksandr Yevdokimovich Novikov (ru)
- Aleksandr Kirillovich Novikov (ru)
- Aleksey Ivanovich Novikov (ru)
- Andrey Vladimirovich Novikov (ru)
- Boris Alekseevich Novikov (ru)
- Vasily Vasilyevich Novikov (ru)
- Vasily Zakharovich Novikov (ru)
- Vasily Ivanovich Novikov (ru)
- Vasily Korneevich Novikov (ru)
- Vasily Mikhailovich Novikov (ru)
- Vasily Sergeevich Novikov (ru)
- Viktor Alekseevich Novikov (ru)
- Vladimir Stepanovich Novikov (ru)
- Gennady Ivanovich Novikov (ru)
- Dmitry Nikolaevich Novikov (ru)
- Yegor Pavlovich Novikov (ru)
- Yefim Vasilyevich Novikov (ru)
- Ivan Vasilyevich Novikov (ru)
- Ivan Mironovich Novikov (ru)
- Konstantin Afanasyevich Novikov
- Kuzma Ivanovich Novikov (ru)
- Mikhail Vasilyevich Novikov (ru)
- Nikolai Aleksandrovich Novikov (general) (ru)
- Nikolai Aleksandrovich Novikov (captain) (ru)
- Nikolai Mikhailovich Novikov (sergeant) (ru)
- Nikolai Mikhailovich Novikov (colonel) (ru)
- Nikolai Nikitovich Novikov (ru)
- Nikolai Stepanovich Novikov (ru)
- Pyotr Sergeyevich Novikov (ru)
- Sergey Trofimovich Novikov (ru)
- Spiridon Danilovich Novikov (ru)
- Stepan Yegorovich Novikov (ru)
- Tit Parfyonovich Novikov (ru)
- Yevgeny Gavrilovich Novitsky (ru)
- Nikolai Mikhailovich Novitsky (ru)
- Aleksandr Stepanovich Novichkov (ru)
- Stepan Matveevich Novichkov
- Pavel Fyodorovich Novodran (ru)
- Ivan Ivanovich Novoshyonov (ru)
- Vasily Filippovich Novozhilov (ru)
- Ivan Vasilyevich Novozhilov (ru)
- Lavrenty Ivanovich Novozhilov (ru)
- Nikolai Vyacheslavich Novozhilov (ru)
- Roman Ivanovich Novopashin (ru)
- Luzma Vasilyevich Novosyolov (ru)
- Lukyan Yevgenyevich Novoseltsev (ru)
- Mikhail Georgievich Novoseltsev (ru)
- Mikhail Ivanovich Novoseltsev (ru)
- Leonid Leonidovich Novospassky (ru)
- Mikhail Stepanovich Novokhatko (ru)
- Mitrofan Petrovich Nogo (ru)
- Stepan Zakharovich Nozhka (ru)
- Boris Diominovich Nominas (ru)
- Pyotr Mikhailovich Noritsyn (ru)
- Ivan Andreevich Norkin (ru)
- Vyacheslav Aleksandrovich Norseev (ru)
- Vasily Ivanovich Nortenko (ru)
- Mikhail Matveevich Noryshev (ru)
- Yevdokiya Ivanovna Nosal
- Aleksey Mikhailovich Noskov (ru)
- Grigory Matveevich Noskov (ru)
- Nikolai Ivanovich Noskov (ru)
- Nikolai Mikhailovich Noskov (ru)
- Aleksandr Andreevich Nosov (ru)
- Aleksandr Mikhailovich Nosov (ru)
- Ivan Stepanovich Nosov (ru)
- Savely Vasilyevich Nosov(ru)
- Aleksandr Zakharovich Nosovets (ru)
- Nikolai Vasilyevich Nosulya (ru)
- Boran Nsanbaev (ru)
- Nadzhib Nugmanovich Nugaev (ru)
- Nikolai Ilyich Nushdov (ru)
- Khanpasha Nuradilov
- Kazbek Beysenovich Nurshanov (ru)
- Talip Latipovich Nurkaev (ru)
- Zholdybay Nurlybaev (ru)
- Sagadat Kozhakhmetovich Nurmagambetov
- Prim Nurmanov (ru)
- Satym Nurmetov (ru)
- Plis Kolgeldievich Nurpeisov (ru)
- Zhepasbay Nursitov (ru)
- Gennady Matveevich Nyrkov (ru)
- Mikhail Aleksandrovich Nyukhtikov (ru)
