= Nosov =

Nosov (Russian: Носов, from нос meaning nose) is a Russian masculine surname, its feminine counterpart is Nosova. Notable people with the surname include:

- Aleksandr Nosov (born 1995), Russian football forward
- Maksim Nosov (born 1976), Russian football player
- Nikolay Nosov (1908–1976), Soviet children's literature writer
- Tamara Nosova (1927–2007), Russian actress
- Victor Nosov (disambiguation)
  - Viktor Nosov (pilot) (1923–1945), Soviet World War II hero
  - Viktor Nosov (footballer), Soviet footballer and coach from Ukraine
- Vitaly Nosov (born 1968), Russian basketball player
- Yevgeni Nosov (writer) (1925–2002), Russian writer
- Yuliya Pechonkina (born Nosova in 1978), Russian sprinter
