= Aleksey Naumov =

Aleksey Naumov may refer to:

- Aleksey Naumov (footballer)
- Aleksey Naumov (officer)
