= Victor Nosov =

Viktor Nosov may refer to:

- Viktor Nosov (pilot) (1923–1945), Soviet war hero of World War II
- Viktor Nosov (footballer) (1940–2008), Ukrainian Soviet footballer and coach

== See also ==
- Nosov
