= Vasily Banykin =

Russian revolutionary (1888–1918)

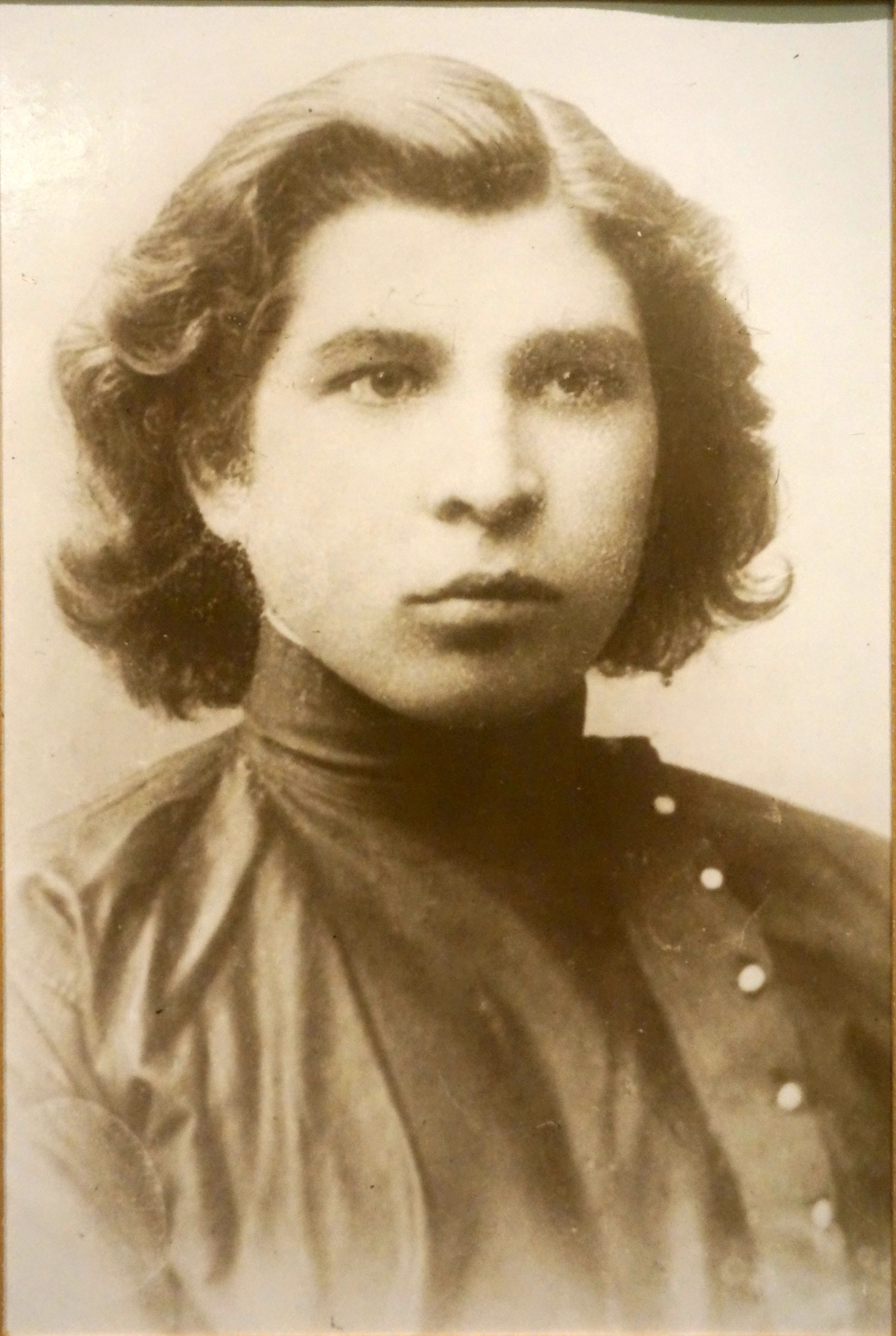
Banykin as a young medical student (1907)

Vasily Vasilevich Banykin (Russian: Василий Васильевич Баныкин; 11 February [O.S. 30 January] 1888 – 15 June 1918) was a Russian revolutionary. He was one of the founders of Soviet power in the city of Tolyatti (then called Stavropol-on-the-Volga). He was the First Chairman of the executive committee of that city (equivalent to mayor). He was killed when Stavropol was falling to the Czech Legion during the Russian Civil War.

== Early life and medical career ==
Banykin was born on 11 February [O.S. 30 January] 1888 in the village of Bektyashka in the Sengileyevsky Uyezd of the Simbirsk Governorate of the Russian Empire (now Sengileyevsky District, Ulyanovsk Oblast, Russia).

Banykin's father was an unskilled laborer, and his parents hoped for him to become a saddle maker, but he decided to become a doctor. In 1904 Banykin was graduated from the Stavropol city secondary school with good to excellent marks. From 1904 to 1908 he studied at medical school in Samara, on a scholarship provided by the Stavropol zemstvo (local government).

From 1908 to 1910 Banykin worked as a medical assistant during an epidemic in Bugulminsky District and later in Hryaschёvke in Stavropol District where he helped fight a cholera epidemic, for which he was given an award by the Stavropol zemstvo.

In 1910 Banykin enrolled in the medical school at the University of Tartu, but only studied for four semesters, as his father died and he was left without means. He applied to the Stavropol zemstvo for a subsidy, on the grounds that he had fought skillfully against the Stavropol cholera epidemic, asking for a stipend of 180 rubles to be repaid after he began practicing medicine. However, his application was rejected because he had only served in Stavropol for one year.

Banykin then returned to Stavropol, where he was employed as a medical assistant in the district hospital, where he worked until 1917.

== Political rise ==
Even before the Russian Revolutions of 1917 Banykin had become a member of the Socialist Revolutionary Party (SR Party). After the split of the party, Banykin adhered to the "Left SR", the more radical and pro-Bolshevik wing.

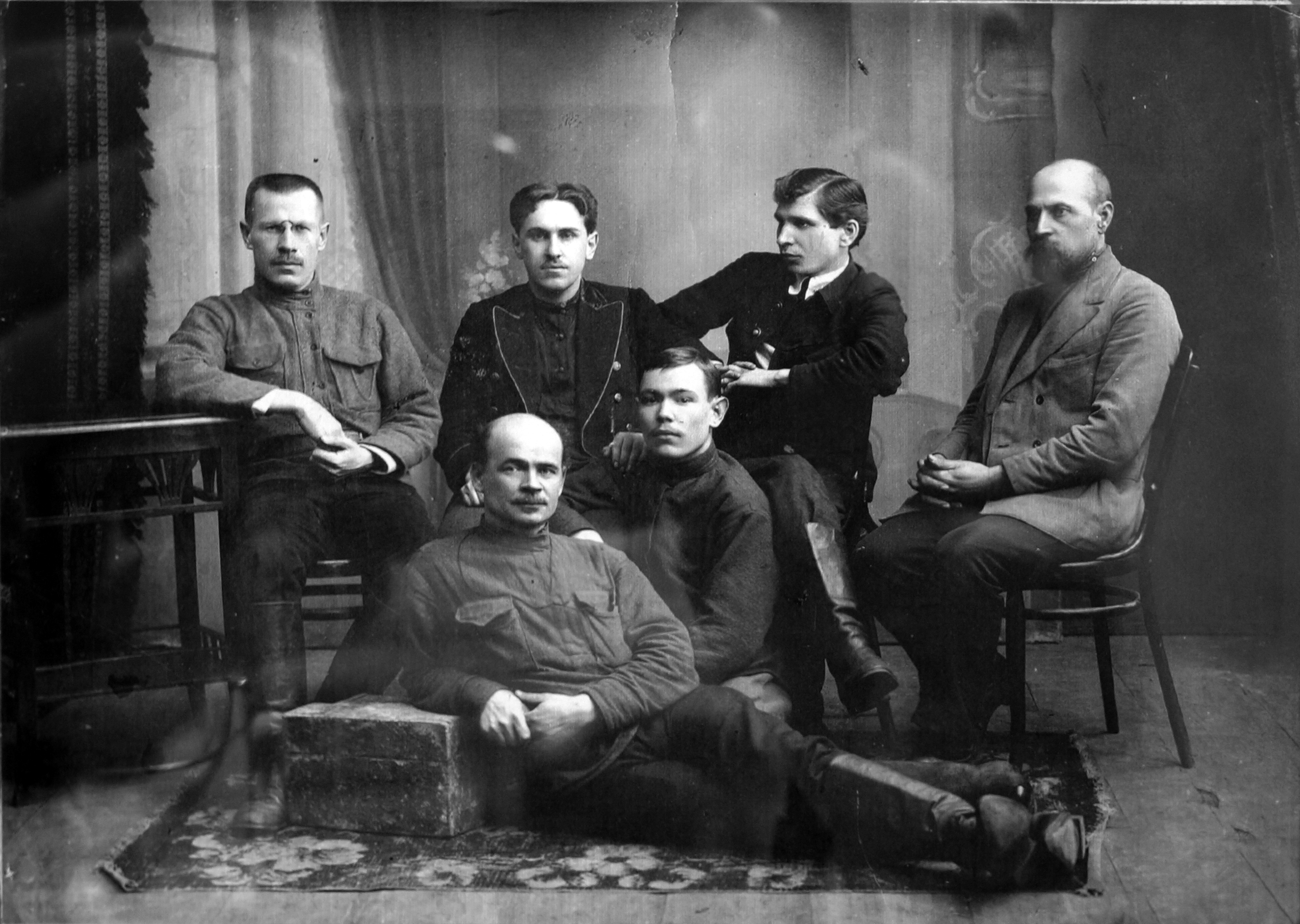
Stavropol District Executive Committee, 1918; Banykin is second from the right

On 5 May 1917 Banykin became First Chairman of the City Council of Stavropol. He actively promoted the Left SR program (land declared national property, urban merchants assessed with high taxes, sharp criticism of the Treaty of Brest-Litovsk). From the very beginning of his term in office, the city introduced the eight hour workday, and spent the money seized from merchants on the creation of kindergartens in the villages of the district and to build a playground in Stavropol as well as hospitals and schools.

Largely due to Banykin's influence, the November 1917 elections to the Russian Constituent Assembly saw a result of 86,131 votes for the Socialist Revolutionary Party against 3,983 for the Bolshevik Party.

Banykin's main achievement was the formation of an entirely new apparatus of power. He achieved unification of purpose of the City Council and with the Council of Peasant Deputies. He participated in the chartering of the first worker's cooperatives in the district. While he used political force to some ends – dissolving the city zemstvo duma (council) and some parish soviets (township assemblies) – under his administration there were no shootings and no political arrests.

On 6 March 1918 Banykin was elected chairman of the executive committee of the Stavropol District, thus becoming the administrative and political chief of an area containing almost a quarter of a million people.

== Death ==
After the Revolt of the Czechoslovak Legion, anti-revolutionary Legion troops advanced on Stavropol, and Banykin supervised the evacuation of the populace and removal of state property and valuables. Banykin's family was evacuated to Sengiley on the ship Hope (Russian: Надежда) where they were to hide with relatives.

However, Banykin himself did not make the evacuation as he was shot dead on 15 June 1918; the exact circumstances are disputed. A few days later Banykin was buried along with others killed that day. Two weeks later, his family had him reburied in a private grave.

Banykin's wife Barbara returned to Stavropol after learning of her husband's death. She was arrested and imprisoned until the capture of the city by the 5th (Kursk) Regiment of the 24th (Simbirsk) Division of the Red Army on 6 October 1918. After Soviet power was thus restored, an investigation of Banykin's murder was immediately started, which investigation lasted until March 1919.

== Disputed versions of Banykin's death ==
Eyewitnesses were interviewed. Their testimony indicated that the killer was a local resident, Mikhail Krasnov, who after the restoration of Soviet power had gone to Siberia, where he lived on forged documents under the name of Žilcov. In 1927 he had been arrested for the murder of Banykin and was imprisoned and then exiled. According to eyewitnesses, Banykin's corpse was abused by a merchant, Shishkin, driving a water cart twice over the body and by having its eyes poked out with a cane.

All this has led to the emergence of a number of different legends and versions concerning the details of the death of Banykin. Soviet propaganda portrayed Banykin as a brave fighting Communist, who fell in the thick of the battle, in the detachment covering the evacuation of public treasures and Communist families.

According to another version, Banykin was not involved in any fighting. The local Tolyatti historian Alexander Turaev wrote in the 1960s that Banykin just went out of town and on the outskirts was shot dead by a "local White Guard".

A third version, described in a book by Tolyatti journalist Sergey Melnik, is that Banykin's death was an accident. Referring to the recollections of eyewitnesses, Melnik concludes that Banykin was accidentally shot dead by a security guard of a warehouse of the district consumer's union, without intention and without any political motivation.

In 1934, in the Stavropol town council (Note: Stavropol had lost city status in 1924.) received a statement from Theodosia Evgrafovna Sokolova, widow of Stavropol Executive Committee Chairman A. M. Sokolov, who had died in 1918 on the "train of death". Theodosia Sokolova accused Banykin of having been in league with the counter-revolutionary Volunteer Army. Sokolova maintained that this had not come out earlier only because Banykin had been killed, and demanded that Banykin Red Guards street be renamed.

== Personal life and family ==
In 1909 Vasily Banykin married teacher Varvara Ivanovna. In 1910 they had a daughter (Varvara), in 1912 a son (Nikolai), and in 1915 a son (Vasily) who died in 1921.

After the death of her husband, in 1921–1922 Varvara Banykina lived in Stavropol with her daughter. During the famine she repeatedly appealed for help to the executive committee, and was allocated food and shoes for her daughter. Varvara Banykina remarried to a Bolshevik named Yakushev, and died in 1924.

Banykin's nephew Victor Banykin (1916-1986) was a writer and author of many books. His niece Anna Agureeva worked as a teacher at a school in the village of Lower Sancheleevo.

== Memorialization ==
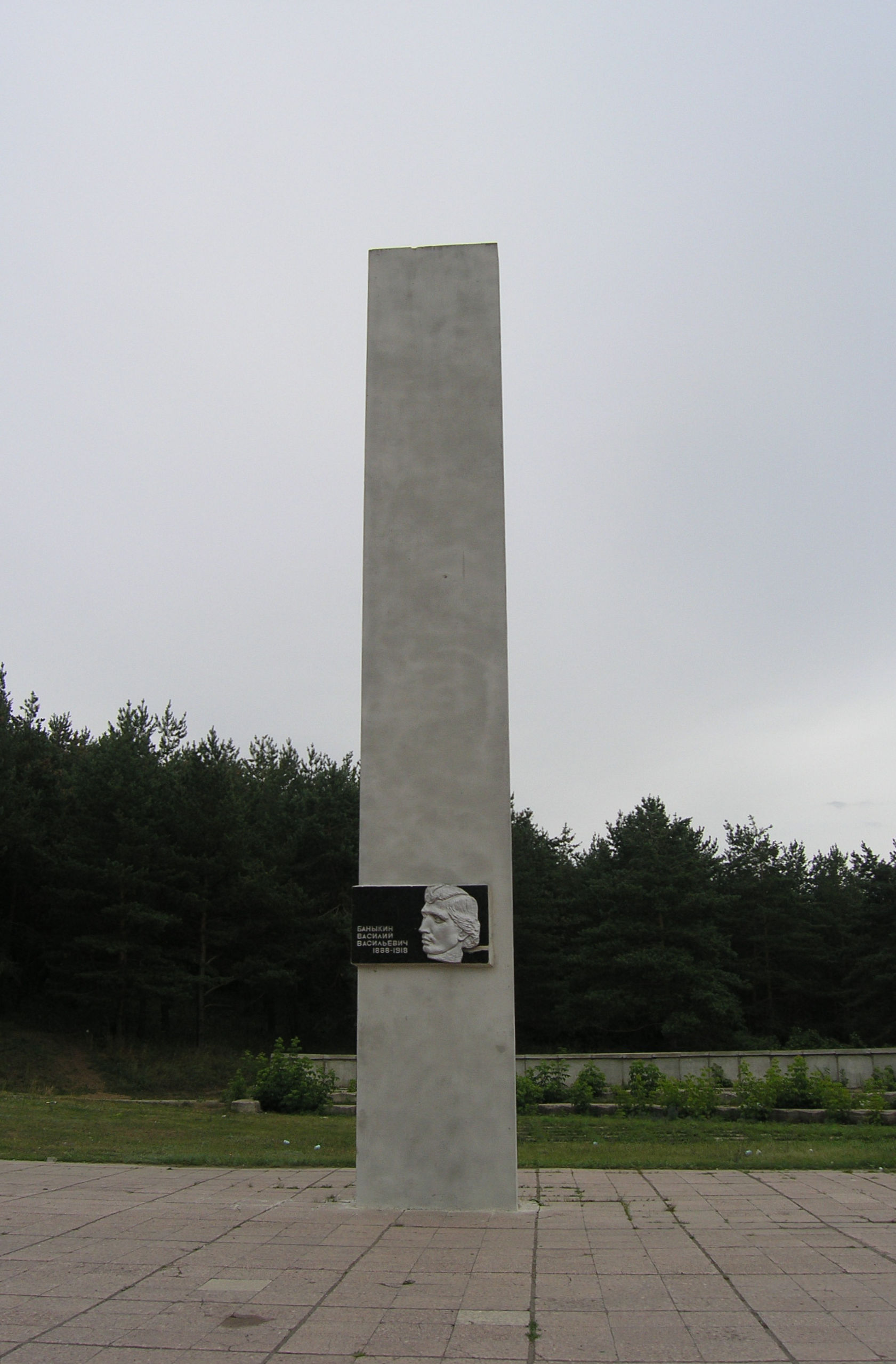
Memorial stele honoring Banykin

Banykin died when the Left SRs were still in coalition with the Bolsheviks, and therefore could not be declared an enemy of the people. Instead, he was declared by the Soviets to have been an active Bolshevik, not just a prominent public figure but a prominent member of the Communist Party. References to Banykin as a Bolshevik appeared in newspapers and books. Only after 1980 did documents surface showing that Banykin was never a Communist.

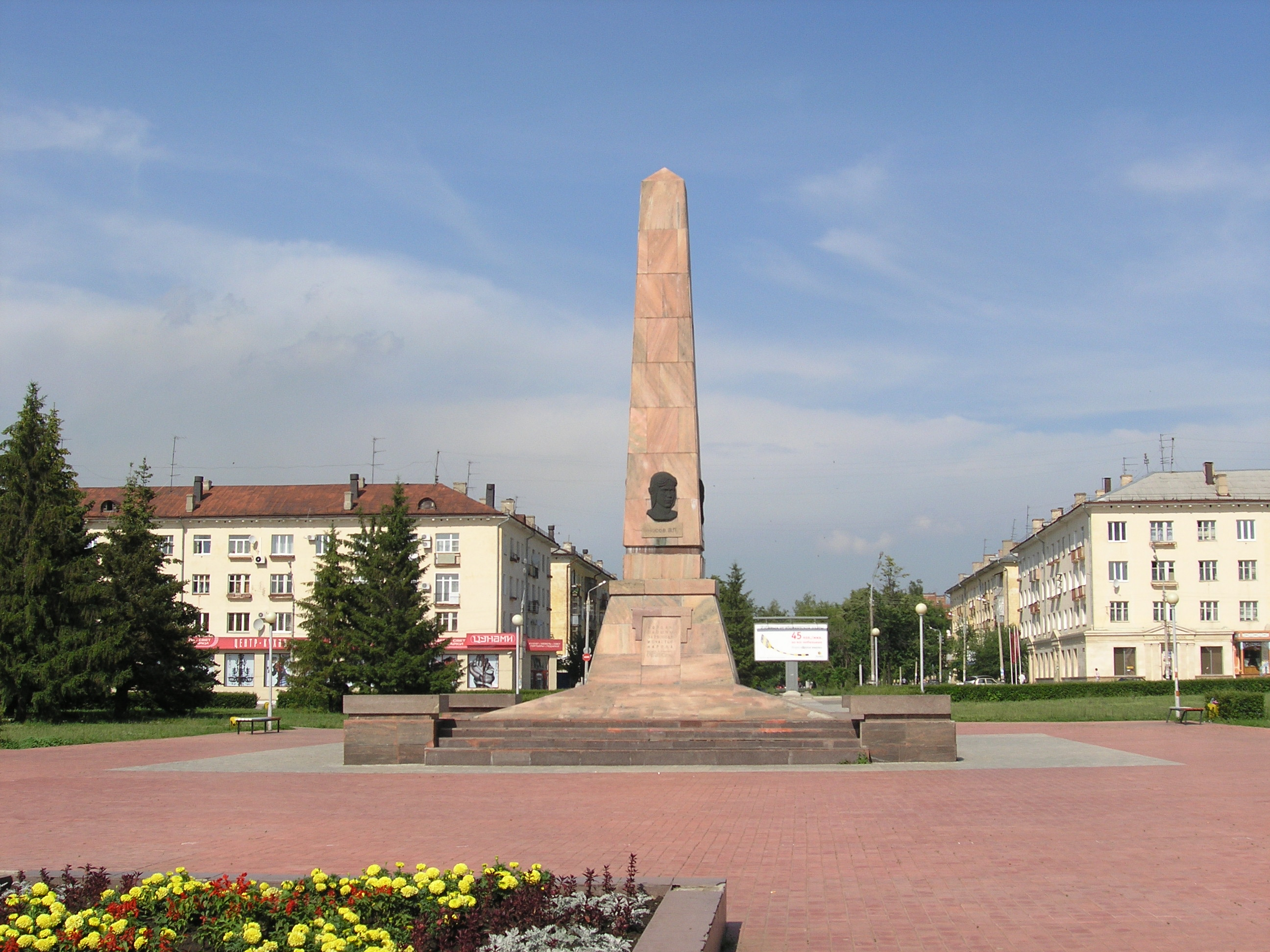
Tolyatti's Obelisk of Glory where Banykin is memorialized

Banykin is one of the four martyrs immortalized on one of the faces of the Obelisk of Glory in Liberty Square in Tolyatti. The other three are a soldier, a sailor, and an airman of World War II.

Also in honor of Banykin there is a plaque on the house where he lived, and a memorial stele on Banykin's grave, in a memorial complex on the banks of the Volga.

A street was named after him in Stavropol; when Stavropol was submerged and relocated to the present Tolyatti, a small street in a residential sector was named for him. By decree number 647/31 of the executive committee of the Council of People's Deputies of Tolyatti on 1 November 1967, he was described as one "who fell at the hands of the enemy in the line of duty" and given a more important street as a namesake. In the same resolution City Clinical Hospital Number 2 of Togliatti was named for Banykin.

One of the training ships of the Tolyatti Young Sailors Club was named Vasily Banykin.
