= Mariya Batrakova =

Maria Stepanovna Batrakova
- Мария Степановна Батракова
- Born: 21 November 1922; Unimer, Novgorod Governorate, RSFSR
- Died: 16 June 1997 (age 74); Saint Petersburg, Russia
- Military career
- Allegiance: Soviet Union
- Branch: Red Army
- Service years: 1939–1945
- Rank: Lieutenant
- Conflicts: World War II
- Awards: Hero of the Soviet Union

Mariya Stepanova Demidova née Batrakova (Russian: Мария Степановна Батракова; 21 November 1922 – 16 June 1997) was a political instructor in the Red Army during World War II. Wounded many times in the war, she was awarded the title Hero of the Soviet Union in 1944 for rallying fellow soldiers to make "Not one step back!"

== Early life ==
Batrakova was born on 21 November 1922 to a working-class Russian family in Petrograd, where she graduated from secondary school and a two-year Red Cross nursing course shortly before leaving art college to volunteer in the Red Army during the Winter War; during the war she served as a medic in the 18th Infantry Division and was stationed in the Karelian isthmus. After the end of the war with Finland she briefly returned to art school.

== World War II ==
Upon the German invasion of the Soviet Union she returned to active duty in the army and was immediately deployed to the warfront as a medic in the 118th Infantry Regiment. Initially she fought on the Northern and Karelian fronts to defend Karelia before sustaining an injury in February 1942 that forced her to remain hospitalized until May. The next month she returned to the front as a medic in the 117th Guards Artillery Regiment, with which she remained until August 1943.

Having then become a Komsomol organizer in the 463rd Infantry Regiment, she went on to rally soldiers to move forward and lead by personal example during battle; during the Donbas offensive, she joined a submachine gunner company attached to an advancing tank unit for a landing operation. After three of their tanks as well as their commander were taken out, leading to the submachine gunners to cease advancing, she jumped atop one of the unusable tanks and rallied the soldiers to continue onward, and they eventually expelled the Germans from their trenches. During the Melitopol offensive, her battalion was supposed to cross the Molochnaya river on 30 September 1943; several soldiers hesitated to enter the filthy water and approach enemy fire, but she urged them to advance with her. When the company commander was killed after falling into an anti-tank ditch, Batrakova continued fighting until reinforcements arrived five days later. In that battle the battalion endured 53 infantry attacks and 18 air attacks, but sustained severe casualties, leaving Batrakova among the wounded survivors. On one occasion when morale was especially low after an air attack she stood up in front of the group and yelled out "Not one step back" to discourage giving up. Despite being wounded twice in the fighting she did not leave the battlefield until reinforcements arrived, and even then she returned to active duty after only three days in the hospital. For her bravery and leadership in that battle she was nominated for the title Hero of the Soviet Union on 27 October 1943, and subsequently she was awarded the title on 19 March 1944 by decree of the Supreme Soviet.

Later on during the Lvov-Sandomierz offensive, she sustained a severe concussion that left her speech impaired for a while; she was transferred away from the warfront after the injury. In November 1944 she married an artillery officer by the name of Aleksandr Demidov, and subsequently took his surname. From July to September 1944 she worked in the Komsomol political division of the Leningrad Air Defense Army, and then worked as the assistant chief of the 22nd Karelian district political department until February 1945. That year she was demobilized due to her poor health, caused by numerous wounds sustained in the war. Throughout the war, she was deployed on the Northwest, Stalingrad, 4th Ukrainian, and 1st Ukrainian fronts, seeing combat in the battles for Bereznegovatoye–Snigirevka, Demyan, Lvov-Sandomierz, Melitopol, Nikopol-Krivoy Rog, Odessa, Rostov, and Stalingrad.

== Later life ==
After the end of the war she and her husband settled in Sestroretsk. An invalid due to her injuries in the war, she never achieved her dream of becoming a doctor. Eventually after her health improved somewhat she became a shopkeeper at a local factory in June 1947. However, she did not remain there for very long, leaving in January 1948 shortly before giving birth to her first son Nikolai. Two years later she had another son, Vladimir. Eventually in August 1966 she became a locksmith, but soon went back to working as a factory shopkeeper before retiring in September 1972. She lived for the remainder of her life in Leningrad, where she died on 16 June 1997 and was buried in the Volkovskoye Lutheran cemetery.

== Awards ==
- Hero of the Soviet Union
- Order of Lenin
- Order of the Red Star
- Order of the Patriotic War 1st class
- Medal "For Courage"
- campaign and jubilee medals

== See also ==
- List of female Heroes of the Soviet Union
- Anna Nikandrova
