= Obelisk of Glory (Tolyatti) =

Monument in Tolyatti, Russia

Coordinates: 53°30′48.5″N 49°24′34″E

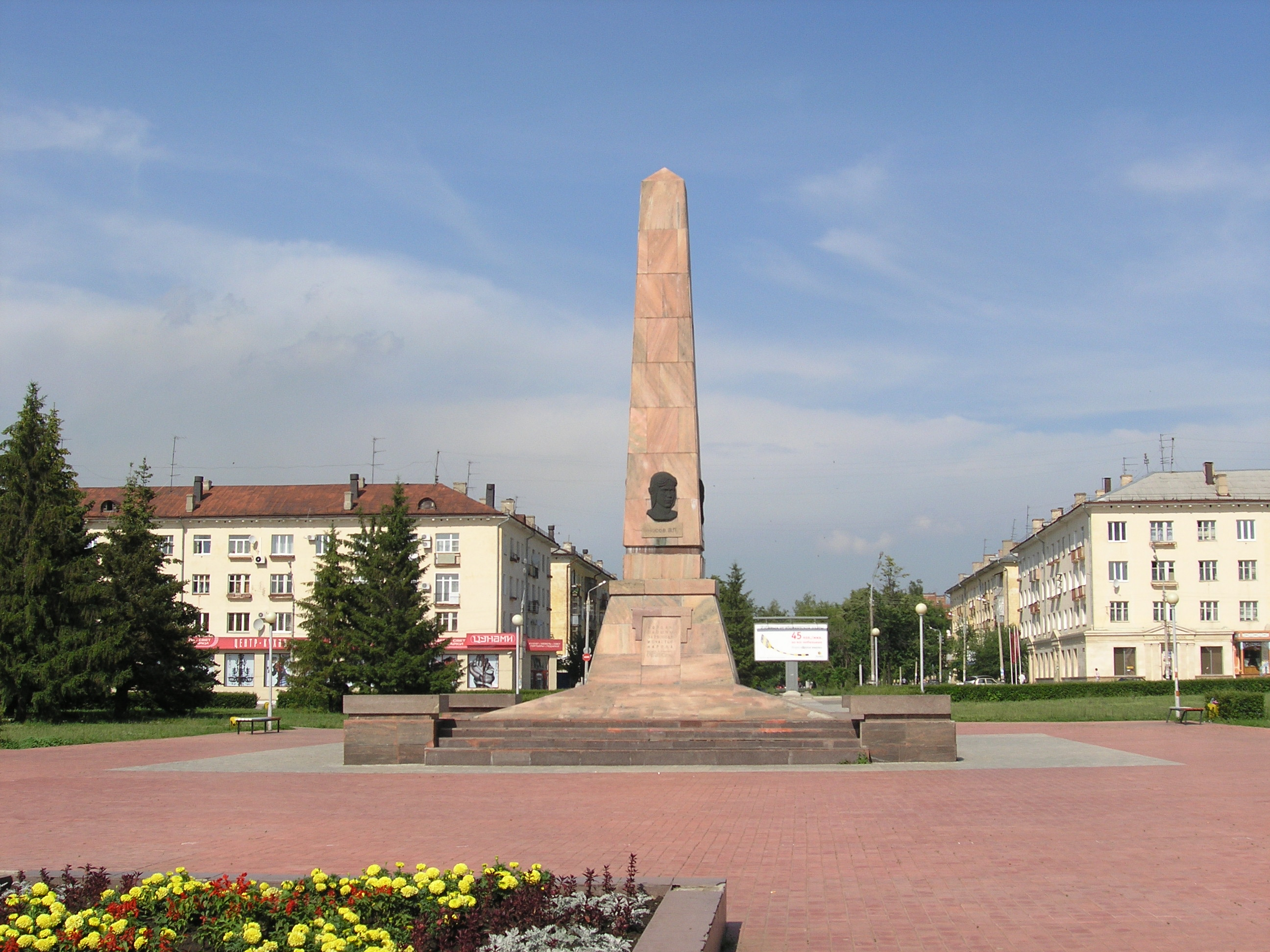
The Obelisk of Glory

The Obelisk of Glory (Russian: Обелиск Славы) is a monument in Tolyatti, Russia located in its Liberty Square dedicated to the soldiers who fought in World War II.

== History ==
Due to the construction of the Zhiguli Hydroelectric Station in the early 1950s, the town of Stavropol (renamed Tolyatti in 1964) fell into the flooding zone of the new Kuybyshev Reservoir on the Volga River and was completely rebuilt on a new site.

Part of the plan for relocating Stavropol was to be an area dedicated to the memory of the poet Alexander Pushkin. But in April 1957, some young builders proposed to instead erect a monument to the fighters of World War II. A design competition was held, won by Mikhail Sorokin, who was awarded a ticket to the 6th World Festival of Youth and Students in Moscow.

Sorokin's design was a classic four-sided obelisk. Three sides depict fighters of the Great Patriotic War who were residents of Stavropol (pilot Victor Nosov, infantry soldier Vasily Zhilin, and seaman Eugene Nikonov) while the fourth depicts Vasily Banykin (1888–1918), an earlier figure, a former Chairman of the Executive Committee of the Stavropol City Council (equivalent to mayor) who was instrumental in establishing revolutionary power in Stavropol and who had been shot during the evacuation of the city in the face of the advancing Czechoslovak Legion.

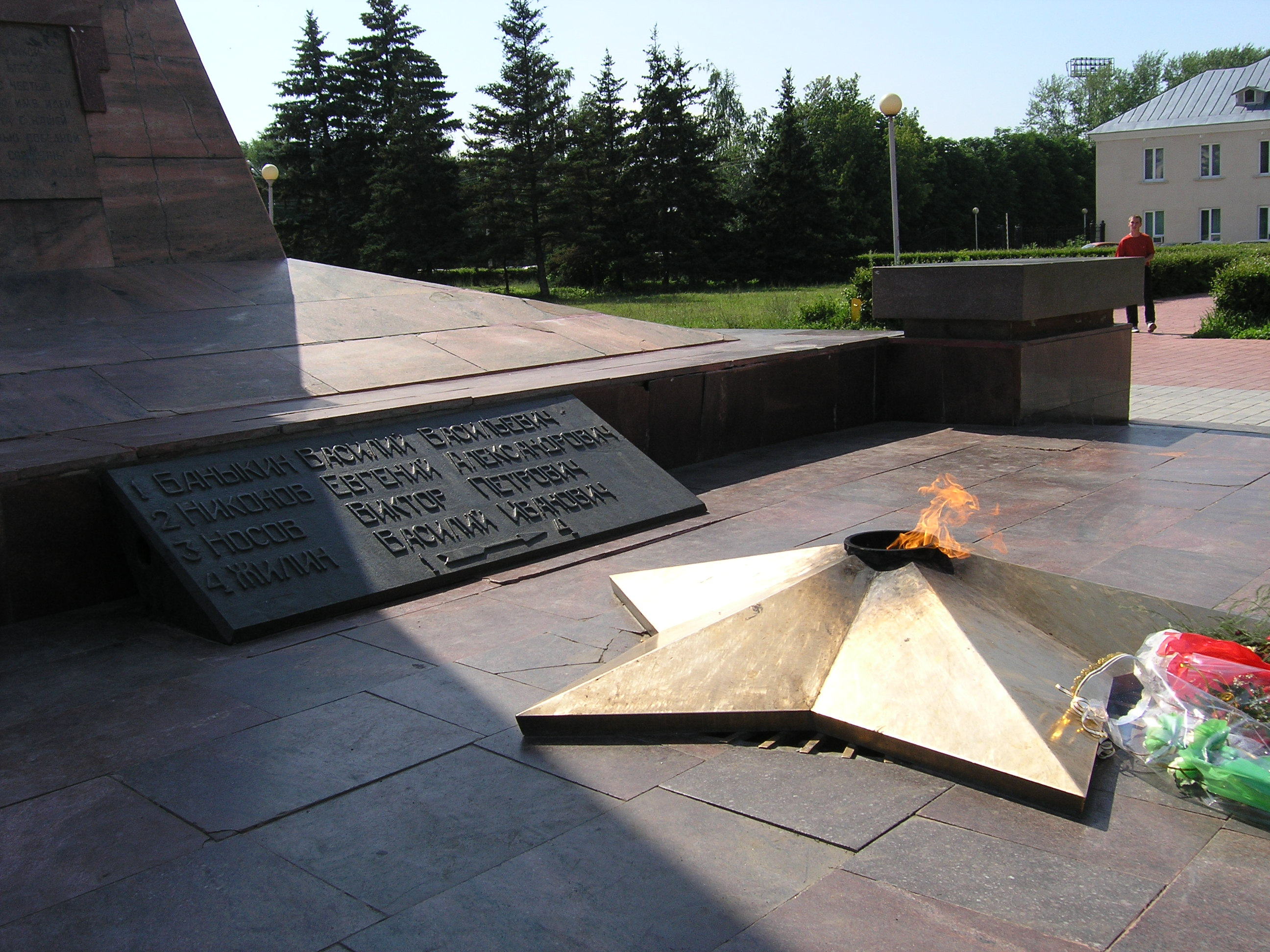
The Eternal Flame

The obelisk was restored and altered in April 1975 in preparation of the 30th anniversary of World War II.

On November 3, 1978 the eternal flame was lit at the monument, delivered by an armored personnel carrier from the flame at the Obelisk of Glory in Samara. After this, the Toylatti monument gradually also came to be referred to as the Obelisk of Glory.
