= Vasily Zhilin =

Red Army soldier

Vasily Ivanovich Zhilin
- Василий Иванович Жилин
- Born: 20 August 1915; Verkhnie Belozerki, Samara Governorate, Russian Empire
- Died: 24 July 1947 (aged 31); Tolyatti, Kuibyshev Oblast, Russian SFSR, USSR
- Military career
- Allegiance: Soviet Union
- Branch: Red Army
- Service years: 1937–1940; 1942–1945
- Rank: Senior Sergeant
- Unit: 199th Guards Regiment
- Conflicts: World War II; Invasion of Poland; Winter War; Eastern Front
- Awards: Hero of the Soviet Union

Vasily Ivanovich Zhilin (Russian: Василий Иванович Жилин) (20 August [O.S. 7 August] 1915 – 24 July 1947) was a Russian soldier of World War II (called, in the Soviet Union, the Great Patriotic War) and a Hero of the Soviet Union.

== Biography ==
Zhilin was born on 20 August [O.S. 7 August] 1915 to a peasant family in the village of Upper Belozёrki in Stavropol Region of Samara province. He lost his father, brothers, and sisters in the Russian famine of 1921–22. Only he and his mother Martha V. survived and they lived in abject poverty and the family is remembered as the poorest in the village. Zhilin had only a primary education.

At age 16, Zhilin began working in the collective farm "Kalinin". He became assistant secretary of the local Komsomol (Communist youth league). In 1933, the Komsolol sponsored Vasily to work on the construction of the rubber-asbestos mill in Yaroslavl. In 1937, he was drafted into the Red Army. After graduating from the regimental school, he became a junior officer. He participated in the occupation of eastern Poland in 1939 and the Winter War against Finland in 1939–1940.

At the German invasion of the Soviet Union on 22 June 1941, Zhilin was in the army reserve. In the early days of the war he was evacuated to Omsk where he worked in the tire plant. He was recalled to active service in December 1941. On 2 February 1942 he was sent to the front, where he served in a heavy mortar battery in the 872nd Infantry Regiment of the 282nd Infantry Division in the northern sector of the front. He participated in battles at Velikiye Luki and Nevel and was wounded on 3 September 1943.

In 1944, Zhilin was a sergeant in a guards rifle company of the 199th Guards Regiment of the 67th Guards Rifle Division, part of the 6th Guards Army of the 1st Baltic Front.

On the night of 25 June 1944, Zhilin and his company crossed the barrier of the Western Dvina. In his report on this action, the commander of the regiment Lieutenant Colonel Degtyarev wrote:

In this battle comrade Zhilin, despite being wounded three times, remained in the ranks. Five times he spurred his soldiers to the attack, leading the charge with cries of "For the Motherland!". And when out of ammunition, they attacked the Nazis with grenades and rifle butts, killing 30. During an enemy counter-attack, he caught a Nazi grenade on the fly and flung it back, where its explosion killed five Nazis.

— Lieutenant Colonel Degtyarev, Action Report

For this heroic action, Zhilin was awarded the decoration of Hero of the Soviet Union. After treatment for his wounds he returned to his post in the guards, where he was twice wounded in further fighting, on 11 August 1944 and 11 November 1944.

After the war, Zhilin was discharged and returned to Stavrapol-on-Don (now Tolyatti), where his mother had moved after remarriage. According to his official biography, he worked in the city's Department of Physical Education and served on the Executive Committee for Sports and took an active part in the social and political life of the city. However, according to the recollections of colleagues, he did not actually work much, for health reasons; his colleagues, in deference to his status as a war hero and in consideration of his poor health, and because he was well-liked, did not require much work of him. He was a member of the District Committee of the Komsomol.

Zhilin died on 24 July 1947 in Stavropol-on-Don, from tuberculosis. He was buried with full military honors. When Stavropol-on-Don was moved to its current location of Tolyatti (because of the filling of the Kuybyshev Reservoir), his grave was moved to Banykinskoe Cemetery.

== Awards ==
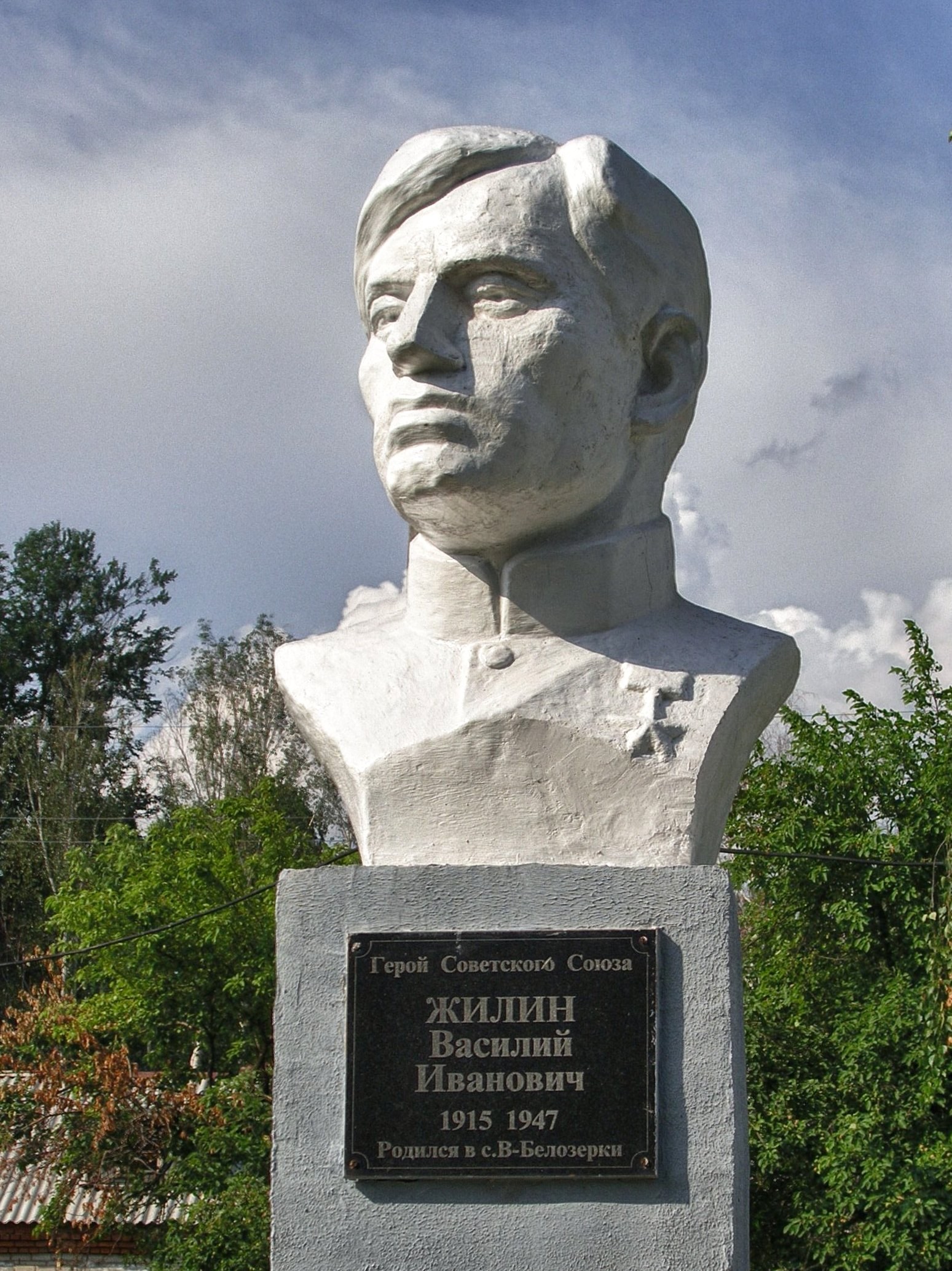
Bust of Vasily Zhilin in his native village of Upper Belozёrki

- Hero of the Soviet Union (number 5016, awarded 24 March 1945)
- Order of Lenin (awarded 24 March 1945)
- Order of the Patriotic War Second Class (awarded 14 December 1944)
- Two Medals For Courage (awarded 15 September 1943 and 24 March 1944)
- Gratitude of the High Command, for distinguished service in battles near Vitebsk and Šiauliai.

== Memorialization ==
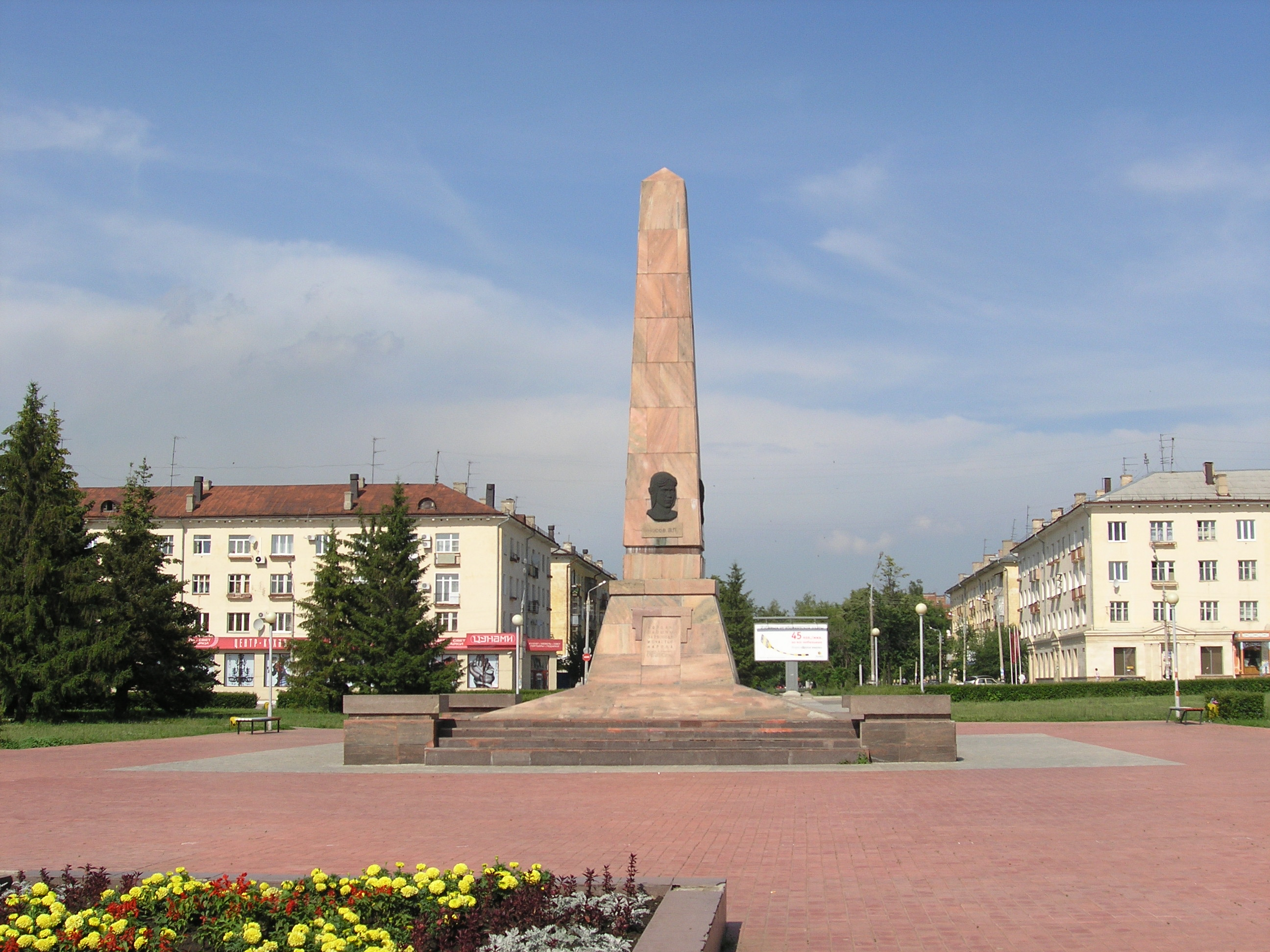
Zhilin is one of four heroes memorialized on the Obelisk of Glory in Liberty Square in Tolyatti

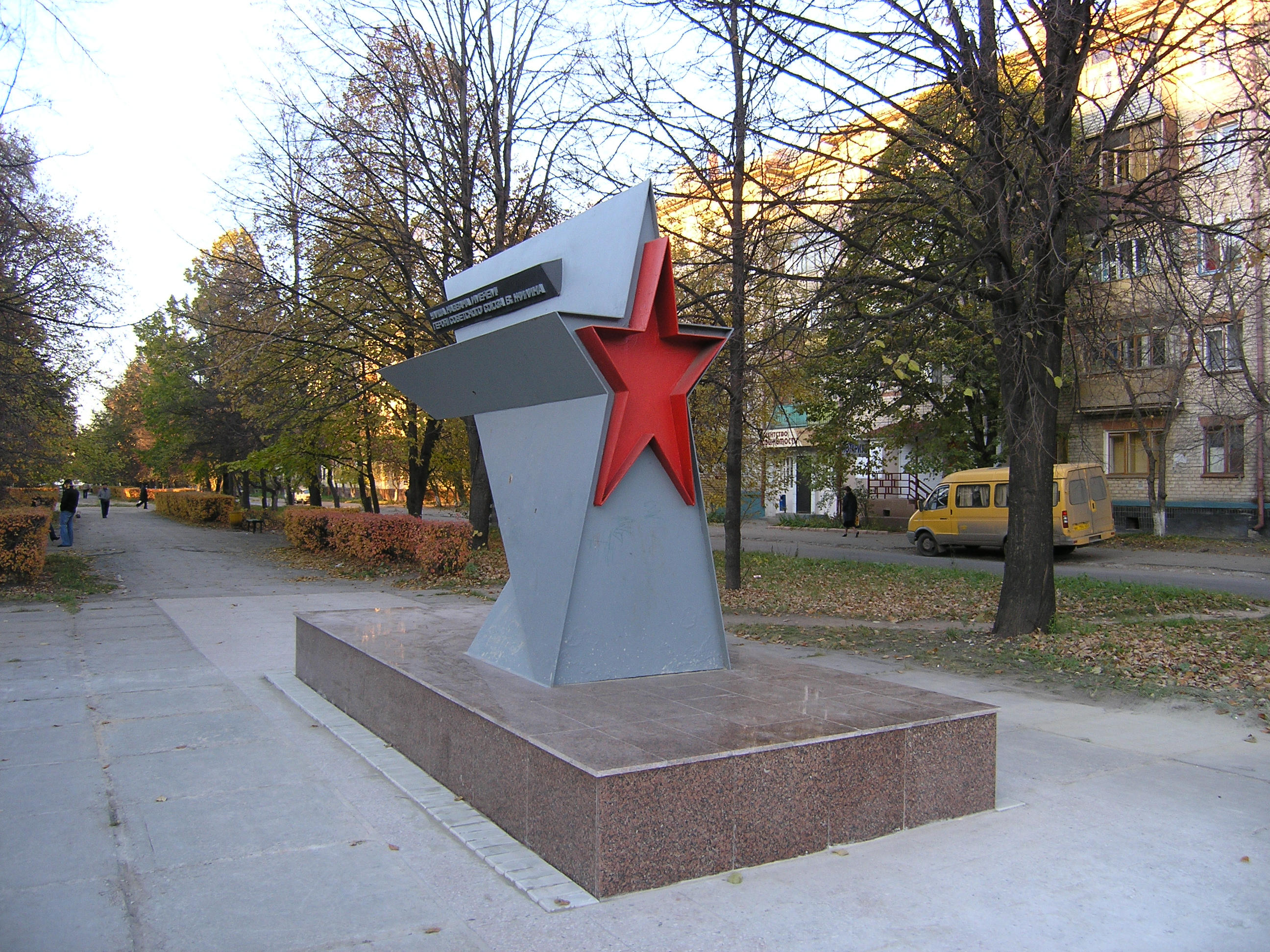
This marker denotes the street named for Zhilin in Tolyatti

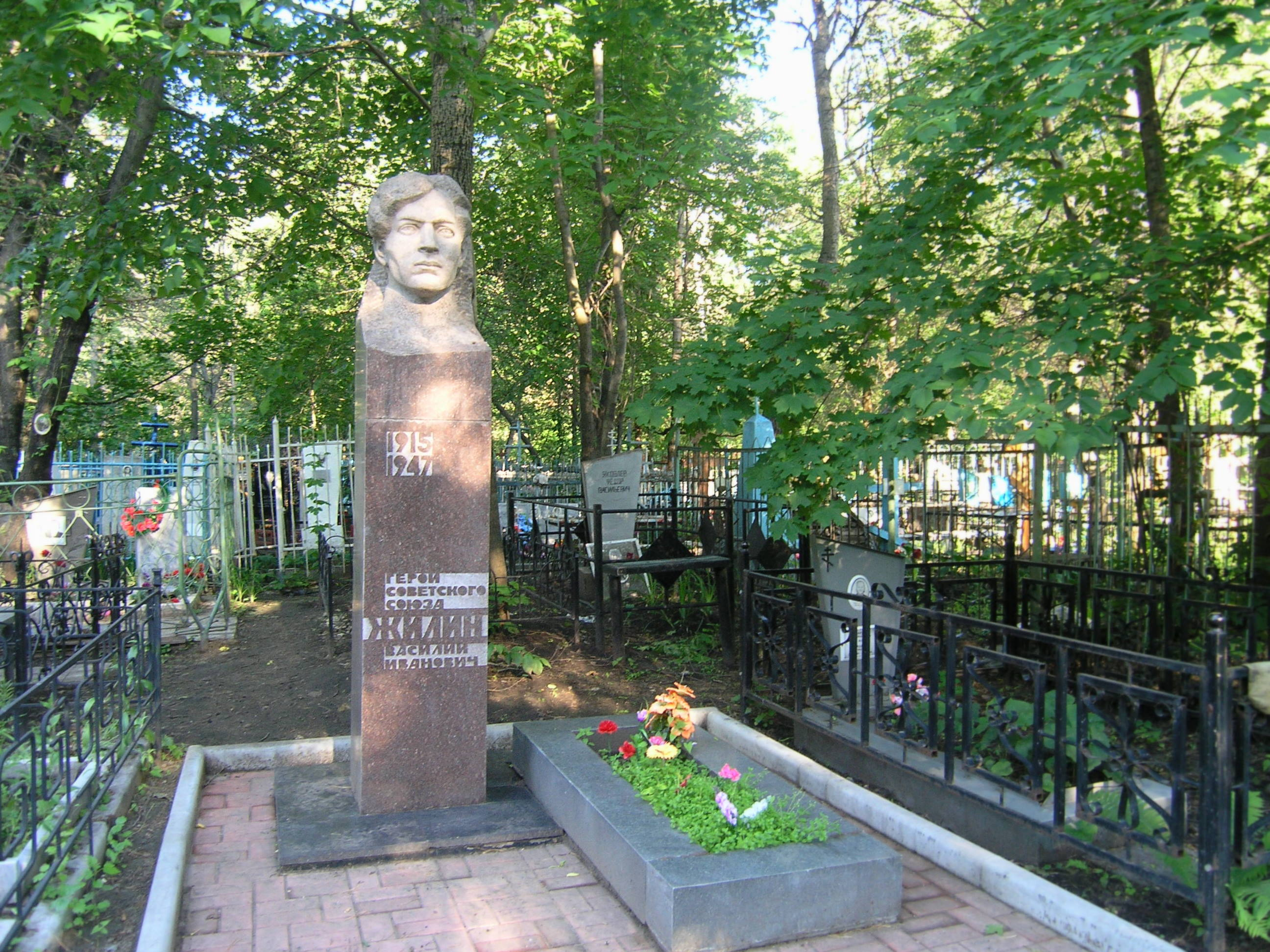
Zhilin's tomb in Tolyatti
