= Nikolai Naydyonov =

Soviet World War II flying ace

- Николай Алексеевич Найдёнов
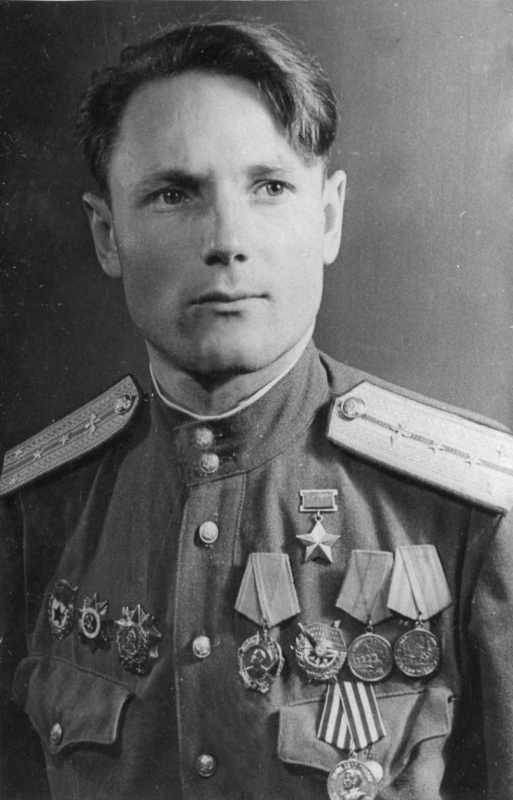
- Naydyonov in 1945
- Born: 9 November 1918; Topchikha, Altai Governorate, RSFSR
- Died: 10 February 1993 (aged 74); Kharkov, Ukraine
- Military career
- Allegiance: Soviet Union
- Branch: Soviet Air Force
- Service years: 1938–1957
- Rank: Lieutenant Colonel
- Conflicts: World War II
- Awards: Hero of the Soviet Union

Nikolai Alekseevich Naydyonov (Russian: Николай Алексеевич Найдёнов; 9 November 1918 — 10 February 1993) was a Soviet flying ace during World War II. Awarded the title Hero of the Soviet Union on 24 August 1943 for his initial victories, by the end of the war his tally stood at an estimated 18 solo and four shared shootdowns.
