= Anna Nikandrova =

Soviet First Lieutenant and Hero of the Soviet Union

Anna Alekseevna Nikandrova
- Анна Алексеевна Никандрова
- Born: 13 October 1921; Barashkino, Pskov Governorate, Russian SFSR
- Died: 23 June 1944 (aged 22); Dubrowna district, Reichskommissariat Ostland
- Military career
- Allegiance: Soviet Union
- Branch: Infantry
- Service years: 1941–1944
- Rank: Senior Lieutenant
- Unit: 426th Rifle Regiment
- Conflicts: World War II †
- Awards: Hero of the Soviet Union

Anna Alekseevna Nikandrova (Russian: Анна Алексеевна Никандрова; 13 October 1921 – 23 June 1944) was a Komsomol organizer in the 426th Rifle Regiment of Red Army during World War II who was posthumously awarded the title Hero of the Soviet Union on 24 March 1945.

== Early life ==
Nikandrova was born on 13 October 1921 to a large Russian peasant family in Barashkino; she had two older sisters as well as two younger brothers. After graduating from her seventh grade of school she worked at a small reading room in Mozuli, Krasnogorodsky district, and later she became an accountant for the local Komsomol committee, which she went on to become elected second secretary of in June 1941.

== World War II ==
Upon the German invasion of the Soviet Union, Nikandrova attended brief training for women wanting to be medics before becoming a nurse at a hospital. On 3 July 1941 she sustained a leg injury after the car transporting wounded soldiers she was in was bombed, killing the driver and one of the wounded soldiers inside. After the attack she flagged down another vehicle passing by, and had the wounded soldiers transferred to that car and sent to Kalinin, where she was treated in the hospital for her injuries. Subsequently in August she became in charge of the accounting department for that city's Komsomol committee, but as German troops approached the city, she joined the Red Army in October 1941. Starting off as a clerk in the headquarters of the 31st Army, she went on to become a political instructor at a field hospital before eventually getting a post on the front lines in March 1943 as the deputy commander for political affairs of the 221st Separate Communications Company; she was admitted to the Communist Party in 1942. While crossing the Vopets River in May 1943 she fell behind from the rest of her unit and lost her bearings; nevertheless, she crossed the river alone and was eventually able to establish communications. For her bravery in going at the crossing alone she was nominated for an Order of the Red Star, but it was downgraded to the Medal "For Courage". In June that year she became the Komsomol organizer of the 2nd battalion in the 758th Infantry Regiment. On 4 September she rallied the soldiers in her company to repel a German counterattack, and stayed on the battlefield despite being wounded twice. In November that year she was promoted to Komsomol organizer of the 426th Infantry Regiment, which she served with for the remainder of her life. On 23 June 1944 her unit fought in the battle for Kireevo village in Vitebsk, where they had to crawl down when they approached an anti-tank ditch, where they came under intense machine-gun fire from nearby enemy bunkers. There, she became the first soldier to climb up a ladder from the ditch, telling her subordinates to follow her, and proceeded to attack the enemy machine-gun nest with a grenade, but was killed by machine-gun fire in the process. She was first buried in the divisional cemetery before being reburied in a mass grave in Dubronvo. Nominated for the title Hero of the Soviet Union the month after her death, she was posthumously awarded the title on 24 March 1945.

== Awards ==
- Hero of the Soviet Union (24 March 1945)
- Order of Lenin (24 March 1945)
- Order of the Patriotic War 2nd class (28 October 1943)
- Medal "For Courage" (30 May 1943)

== See also ==
- List of female Heroes of the Soviet Union
- Mariya Batrakova
