= Konstantin Novikov =

Soviet World War II flying ace

- Константин Афанасьевич Новиков
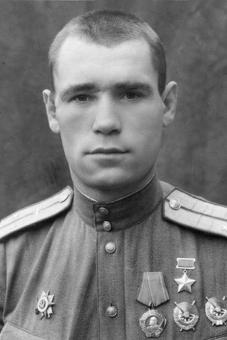
- Born: 6 August 1919; Medvezhye village, Oryol Governorate, RSFSR
- Died: 9 January 1958 (aged 38); Moscow, USSR
- Military career
- Allegiance: Soviet Union
- Branch: Soviet Air Force
- Service years: 1939—1945
- Rank: Captain
- Conflicts: World War II
- Awards: Hero of the Soviet Union

Konstantin Afanasyevich Novikov (Russian: Константин Афанасьевич Новиков; 6 August 1919 — 9 January 1958) was a Soviet flying ace during World War II, who was awarded the title Hero of the Soviet Union on 1 May 1943 for his initial victories. Historians disagree on the exact breakdown of his final tally at the end of the war with Mikhail Bykov indicating that he totaled 28 solo and five (or three) shared shootdowns, and Andrey Simonov claiming that he had 31 solo and nine shared instead.
