= Stepan Novichkov =

Soviet fighter pilot

- Степан Матвеевич Новичков
- Born: 29 October 1921; Klepalniki village, Moscow Governorate, RSFSR
- Died: 20 July 1992 (aged 70); Moscow, Russian Federation
- Military career
- Allegiance: Soviet Union
- Branch: Soviet Air Force
- Service years: 1941–1946
- Rank: Lieutenant Colonel
- Conflicts: World War II
- Awards: Hero of the Soviet Union

Stepan Matveevich Novichkov (Russian: Степан Матвеевич Новичков; 29 October 1921 — 20 July 1992) was a Soviet fighter pilot during World War II. Awarded the title Hero of the Soviet Union on 4 February 1944 for his victories, by the end of the war his tally stood at an estimated 33 solo plus one shared shootdowns.
