= Yevgeni Nikolayev =

Soviet Army colonel

- Евгений Николаев
- Born: 2 September 1923; Moscow, Russian SFSR, Soviet Union
- Died: 12 April 1990 (aged 66); Moscow, Russian SFSR, Soviet Union
- Military career
- Allegiance: Soviet Union
- Branch: Soviet Army
- Service years: 1940–1967
- Rank: Colonel
- Unit: 57th Guards Rifle Division
- Conflicts: World War II; Lublin-Brest Offensive
- Awards: Hero of the Soviet Union; Order of Lenin; Order of the Patriotic War, 1st class Order of the Red Star (2x); Medal "For Courage"

Yevgenii Dmitrievich Nikolayev (Russian: Евгений Дмитриевич Николаев; 2 September 1921 – 12 April 1990) was a Soviet Army colonel of engineers and Hero of the Soviet Union. In 1944, he was the commander of the radio detachment of the 128th Guards Artillery Regiment, 57th Guards Rifle Division, 8th Guards Army, 1st Belorussian Front. He was a master sergeant at the time and was awarded the title Hero of the Soviet Union on 26 October 1944. Nikolayev received Gold Star No. 5136.

== Early life ==
Yevgeni Nikolayev was born on 2 September 1923 in Moscow. He graduated from the tenth grade in 1939, and by January 1940, he was serving in the Soviet Navy. He served as a radioman in the Baltic Fleet.

== World War II ==
In January 1942, Nikolayev completed radiotelegraphic courses in Tashkent, and became the chief of a reserve cavalry regiment radio station in Chardzhou. In July, Nikolayev was transferred to become the radio station commander of the 1035th Artillery Regiment of the 153rd Rifle Division. For its actions during Operation Little Saturn, the division became known as the 57th Guards Rifle Division and the regiment became the 128th Guards Artillery Regiment in December. In 1943, he joined the Communist Party of the Soviet Union. During January and February 1943, he fought in Operation Gallop. On 30 April, he received the Medal "For Courage". Nikolayev fought in the Izyum-Barvenkovo Offensive in late July. He then fought in the Battle of the Dnieper during September and October. On 6 November, he was awarded his first Order of the Red Star. In January 1944, Nikolayev participated in the Nikopol–Krivoi Rog Offensive. He fought in the Bereznegovatoye–Snigirevka Offensive in March and the Odessa Offensive weeks later.

In July, the division began combat operations during the Lublin–Brest Offensive. On the night of 1 August, a group of scouts led by Nikolayev crossed the Vistula. They were fired upon by German artillery and Nikolayev was wounded in the leg. Once upon the other bank, he reportedly refused to go back across the river. When the division's assault began, Nikolayev used his radio with the help of the other men in the patrol to report coordinates of German artillery batteries. This allowed for effective counterbattery fire, reportedly contributing to the success of the attack. The division's advance created the Magnuszew bridgehead. On 26 October 1944, Nikolayev was awarded the title Hero of the Soviet Union and the Order of Lenin.

In January 1945, the division resumed the advance during the Vistula–Oder Offensive. Nikolayev fought in this offensive and the Berlin Offensive, ending the war in Berlin.

== Postwar ==
In August 1945, Nikolayev underwent officer training, graduating as a junior lieutenant, and the following year he completed the postgraduate course for platoon commanders. He then served in an artillery platoon as head of communications in the Group of Soviet Forces in Germany until December 1946. In 1954, he graduated from the Zhukovsky Air Force Engineering Academy, and then served as a senior engineer in the department. On 26 October 1955, he was awarded the Order of the Red Star for fifteen years of service. In 1958 he became a chief engineer, and two years later became a senior engineer at the laboratory. Between June and December 1961, he was the deputy senior military representative at the Voyennoye predstavitelstvo, responsible for weapons quality control. Nikolayev then became a senior engineer at the 4th Main Directorate of the Ministry of Defence, responsible for designing air defence weapons. In 1964, he became a senior researcher at the 22nd Central Scientific Research Institute in Mytishchi. In March 1967, he retired with the rank of colonel.

From 1967, Nikolayev worked as the head of the All-Union Television Center. Between 1972 and 1973, he was an engineer for an energy trust. During 1973 and 1974, he was the director of the Senezh cinema in Solnechnogorsk. Nikolayev became the deputy director of the Progress theatre in Moscow in 1974. From 1975 to 1986 he worked successively as head of operations of an office building, the assistant director of civil defense, engineer and instructor in fire safety and senior researcher at the National Research Institute of Textile and Haberdashery Industry. On 11 March 1985, he was awarded the Order of the Patriotic War 1st class on the 40th anniversary of World War II. Nikolayev retired from his job in 1986 and lived in Moscow. He died on 12 April 1990 and was buried in Khovanskoye Cemetery.
