= Yevgeny Nikonov =

Soviet sailor

Yevgeny Nikonov

Yevgeny Alexandrovich Nikonov (Russian: Евге́ний Алекса́ндрович Ни́конов; 18 December 1920 – 19 August 1941, in Harku, Soviet Union) was a Russian sailor during the Soviet defense of Estonia in 1941. He is a holder of the Hero of the Soviet Union, the Soviet Union's highest award.

== Life and death ==
Nikonov was born on 18 December 1920 into an ethnically Russian peasant family in the village of Vasilyevka in what is now Stavropolsky District of Samara Oblast. (Note: Stavropol District is not to be confused with Stavropol Region. Stavropol District was formed in 1928. Samara Oblast was named Kuybyshev Oblast from 1935 to 1990.) He joined the navy in 1939 and served as a torpedo electrician on the destroyer leader Minsk attached to the Soviet Baltic Fleet.

Following the 1941 German invasion of the Soviet Union, Nikonov and many other Baltic Fleet sailors were deployed as emergency naval infantry.

Nikonov fought in the defense of Tallinn (5–28 August 1941), the main base of the Baltic Fleet. According to Soviet official version while engaged in reconnaissance near the town of Keila on 19 August he was seriously wounded and captured. Despite being tortured, Nikonov refused to give his captors any military information, for which the Germans doused him with gasoline and burned him alive.

On 19 April 1943 Baltic Fleet commander Vice–Admiral Vladimir Tributs ordered that Torpedo Electrician Yevgeny Nikonov forever be listed as a member of the Minsk's active crew. (This tradition continues today; although the Minsk was long ago scrapped, Yevgeny Nikonov is always listed on the active personnel roster of a Baltic Fleet training unit.)

Nikonov was posthumously awarded the title of Hero of the Soviet Union on 3 September 1957.

=== Controversy ===
There is no independent proof that story behind Nikonov's death is true, as all sources are tied to the Soviet or Russian state. Some commenters have suggested that the chronology of events is hard to fit into the Soviet/Russian account, and that, although Nikonov was a real person, the story of his martyrdom was constructed for propaganda purposes, although there is no definite evidence of this either.

== Burials ==
Nikonov was originally buried on a farm in Harku. On 19 March 1951 the Tallinn City Council decided to rename a street in Nikonov's honor. The same decree granted a request by Baltic Fleet Command for land in the Kadriorg district to construct a monument to Nikonov.

Soon after, Nikonov's remains were ceremoniously reinterred in a picturesque location in Tallinn park, on the hill of Maarjamäe, and a monument was erected. Following the collapse of the Soviet Union, the monument was demolished. (The statue, now missing its head, is at the outdoor exhibition of Soviet monuments at Maarjamäe Palace of the Estonian History Museum.)

On 2 March 1992 Nikonov was again reinterred, in his home town of Vasilyevka in Russia. According to some sources, when the attempt was made to disinter Nikonov's remains for reburial in Russia, his remains were missing – it remains unclear, whether the remains were there in the first place. There have been accusations that the remains were taken by Estonian nationalists, and were then offered in exchange for information about the burial location of some men of the 20th Waffen Grenadier Division of the SS (1st Estonian) (a unit of Estonians who had fought for the Germans against the Soviets) who had been shot after the Soviets reoccupied Tallinn in 1944. So the reburial delegation from Tolyatti just filled the coffin with some earth from around Nikonov's grave and returned with that to Russia.

== Memorialization ==
Tolyatti, the city nearest Nikonov's birthplace, contains several memorials to him. A street was named in his honor on 13 November 1958, and a square in 1980. There is a memorial at school number 19 (now Lyceum № 19). He is depicted on one of the faces of the Obelisk of Glory in Liberty Square. A memorial was opened on 9 May 1979 in Nikonov Square in the Gateway District.

A tanker (of the shipping company Volgotanker) was named for Nikonov. A street and a school (school number 68, where Nikonov had studied) in the Moskovsky District of Nizhny Novgorod were named for Nikonov in 1957. Later, a monument was erected in front of the school, and in 1972 the school opened a museum of the hero. There is a memorial plaque at the plant where Nikonov worked, and a monument at his grave in the village of Vasilyevka. A street in the Krasnoglinsky District of Samara was named Hero Of The Soviet Union Nikonov Street on 5 January 1978.

== Awards ==
- Hero of the Soviet Union
- Order of Lenin
- Order of the Patriotic War First Class
