= Alexander Nazarov =

Hero of the Soviet Union (1925–1945)

- Александ Александрович Назаров
- Born: 25 May 1925; Saratov Governorate, Russian Socialist Federative Soviet Republic, Soviet Union
- Died: 7 February 1945 (aged 19); Legnica, Nazi-occupied Poland (now Poland)
- Military career
- Allegiance: Soviet Union
- Service years: 1943–1945
- Rank: Junior Lieutenant
- Conflicts: World War II
- Awards: Hero of the Soviet Union

Alexander Nazarov (25 May 1925 – 7 February 1945) was a Soviet army officer and Hero of the Soviet Union. He was a participant in World War II against Nazi Germany. For his actions, he was a recipient of the Order of Lenin and the Order of the Red Star.

During the Battle of the Seelow Heights, he destroyed 15 tanks with AT grenades. He died by shrapnel near Seelow Heights.
