= Maksim Nosov =

Russian footballer

Personal information
- Full name: Maksim Gennadyevich Nosov
- Date of birth: 19 November 1976 (age 49)
- Height: 1.90 m (6 ft 3 in)
- Position: Defender

Senior career*
Years	Team	Apps	(Gls)
1992	FC Burovik Samara		
1993	FC Krylia Sovetov Samara	0	(0)
1995–1996	FC Neftyanik Pokhvistnevo	54	(4)
1997–1998	FC Lada-Togliatti-VAZ Togliatti	48	(4)
1999	FC Neftyanik Pokhvistnevo	15	(3)
1999	FC Metallurg Krasnoyarsk	5	(0)
2000	FC Lokomotiv Nizhny Novgorod	9	(0)
2000	FC Lada Togliatti	3	(0)
2001	FC Tyumen	20	(1)
2002–2003	FC LUKoil Chelyabinsk	41	(1)
2003	FC Gazovik Orenburg	12	(1)
2004	FC LUKoil Chelyabinsk	22	(0)
2005	FC Yunit Samara (amateur)		
2005–2006	FC Dynamo Makhachkala	35	(1)
2006	FC Zvezda Irkutsk	21	(0)
2007	FC Amur Blagoveshchensk	14	(1)
2007	FC Mordovia Saransk	8	(0)
2008	FC Alma-Ata	0	(0)
2008	FC Yunit Samara	13	(1)
- * Club domestic league appearances and goals

Maksim Gennadyevich Nosov (Russian: Максим Геннадьевич Носов; born 19 November 1976) is a former Russian football player.
