= Viktor Nosov (pilot) =

Hero of the Russian Federation

Victor Petrovich Nosov
- Native name: Виктор Петрович Носов
- Born: March 26, 1923; Sengiley, Simbirsk, USSR
- Died: February 13, 1945 (aged 21)
- Allegiance: Soviet Union
- Branch: Soviet Air Force
- Service years: 1941-1945
- Rank: Lieutenant
- Awards: Order of the Red Banner; Hero of the Russian Federation (posthumously)

Victor Petrovich Nosov (Russian: Виктор Петрович Носов; March 26, 1923 – February 13, 1945) was a Soviet war hero of World War II (called, in Russia, the Great Patriotic War).

== Life ==
Nosov was born on March 26, 1923, in the town of Sengiley in Ulyanovsk Province (then named Simbirsk Province), in a family of Russian ethnicity.

Victor Nosov's father, Peter Ivanovich, worked as a prosecutor. Peter Nosov had started as a court courier at age 14, being appointed secretary of the Simbirsk district court in 1914. In 1918 Peter Nosov married Taisii Vasil, after which he was graduated from college and served as a judge and prosecutor. Since prosecutors were then not allowed to work in one place for more than five years, the family lived in Simbirsk (now Ulyanovsk), Ardatov, Novodevichy, and Stavropol-on-Volga (now Tolyatti).

Victor had an older sister (Zinaida Petrovna) and a younger brother. In 1939 his family moved to Stavropol-on-Volga where he attended Secondary School #1 and become interested in radio engineering. After being graduated from 8th grade he entered a factory school and worked as a fitter at the radio station.

The German invasion of the Soviet Union occurred on June 22, 1941, when Nostov had just turned 18. He was first sent to infantry training, but soon transferred to the aviation school in Stalinabad, and in 1943 was enrolled in the Levanevsky Naval Aviation School, where he earned his pilot's certification.

In October 1944 Second Lieutenant Nosov reported to 51st Mine-Torpedo Regiment of the Baltic Fleet air force, equipped with American-made A-20 Boston twin-engined light bombers. He flew his first mission on October 18. From December 1944 he flew anti-shipping missions against German transports in the Baltic Sea and the port of Libau. He and his crew flew six sorties, their role being to fly in advance of the torpedo bombers and lay down suppressive fire on the enemy's anti-aircraft weapons, a dangerous task.

Nosov and his crew participated in these sinkings:

- December 12, 1944 – in a group of aircraft which attacked Libau and sank a 6,000 ton transport (not fully confirmed)
- December 14, 1944 – in a group of aircraft which attacked Libau and sank a patrol boat (reliably confirmed)
- December 22, 1944 – near Libau, bombed and sank an enemy patrol boat (not fully confirmed)
- February 5, 1944 – Near Danzig Bay, in a group of aircraft which sank a 7,000 ton transport (not fully confirmed)

On February 10, 1945, Nosov was made a full lieutenant.

== Death ==
On Nosov's sixth combat mission, on February 13, 1945, his A-20 was in the southern part of the Baltic Sea (at about 55°23′00″N 19°00′00″E) attacking a transport of 6000 tons displacement when it was hit by anti-aircraft fire and burst into flames. Nosov flew his burning plane directly into the transport, which blew up and sank. Besides Nosov, his navigator (Second Lieutenant Alexander Igoshin) and gunner (Sergeant Fedor Dorofeev) perished. This was the war's first deliberate ramming of an enemy ship in the Baltic Sea.

It is manifest to all: an unquenchable force of hatred for the enemy and ardent love for the homeland motivated each crew member. This unstoppable force inspired them to heroic deeds and called them to mount their fate to victory. For this victory, these Baltic Falcons gave without regret their precious lives. The feat of these heroes of the Baltic, Victor Nosov and his comrades Alexander Igoshin and Fedor Dorofeev, will for all time serve as a model of military duty to aviators and mariners of the Baltic Sea.

— Political Directorate, Baltic Fleet

== Awards ==
- Hero of the Russian Federation
- Order of the Red Banner

While still alive, Nosov was awarded the Order of the Red Banner on January 20, 1945 by order of the Commander of the Baltic Fleet "For the outstanding performance of combat missions during the Great Patriotic War, and for bravery and heroism". In April 1945, December 1947, and June 1953, he was nominated for posthumous award of Hero of the Soviet Union; these petitions were not successful, but he was awarded the post-Soviet equivalent, Hero of the Russian Federation, by Presidential Decree №187 of February 23, 1998.

== Memorialization ==
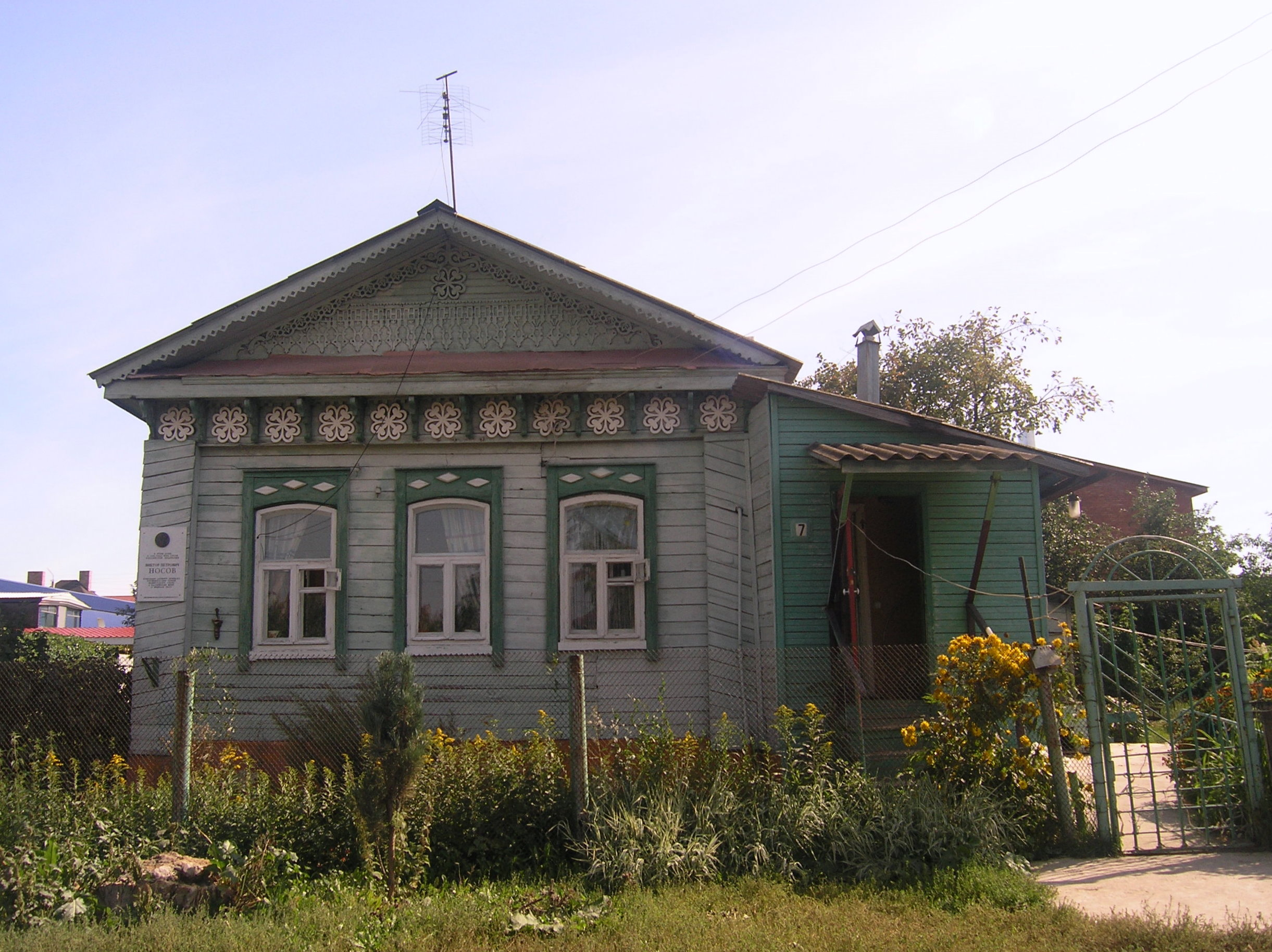
Nosov's house in Tolyatti has been preserved

Tolyatti has memorialized Nosov in several ways. There is a memorial with a bust of Nosov (by A. I Frolov) in front of Secondary School #4 on Gorky street in the Central District. His image is one of the four bas-reliefs on the Obelisk of Glory in Liberty Square. River Street in the Komsomol District of Tolyatti was renamed to Victor Nosov Street. In front of Secondary School #1 is a stele with the names of alumni who died during the Great Patriotic War (including Nosov) on the front. Nosov's house in Stavropol was preserved when the city was moved prior to the creation of the Kuybyshev Reservoir (which submerged the old city). It is now located at 7 Pioneer Street and bears a memorial plaque.

Remember this: in the Baltic out so far from shore / How he hit the transport like a steel meteor / And the sea, it swallowed him and he was gone / But the explosion echoed like a victory song.

— Igor Neverov, Ballad of Victor Nosov

A memorial in his birthplace of Sengiley was dedicated in 1965 and street there is named after him, a street in Kaliningrad is named Victor Nosov Street, and there is a monument to Nosov and his crew on Cape Rozewie in Puck, Poland, north of Gdańsk (the former Danzig). The inscription on the plaque there reads "On February 13, 1945, the Soviet airmen Victor Nosov, Alexander Igoshin, and Fedor Dorofeev died for our freedom and yours..." (the phrase "For our freedom and yours" has long been associated with Poland).

== See also ==
- List of Heroes of the Russian Federation
