= Liberty Square (Tolyatti) =

Square in Tolyatti, Russia

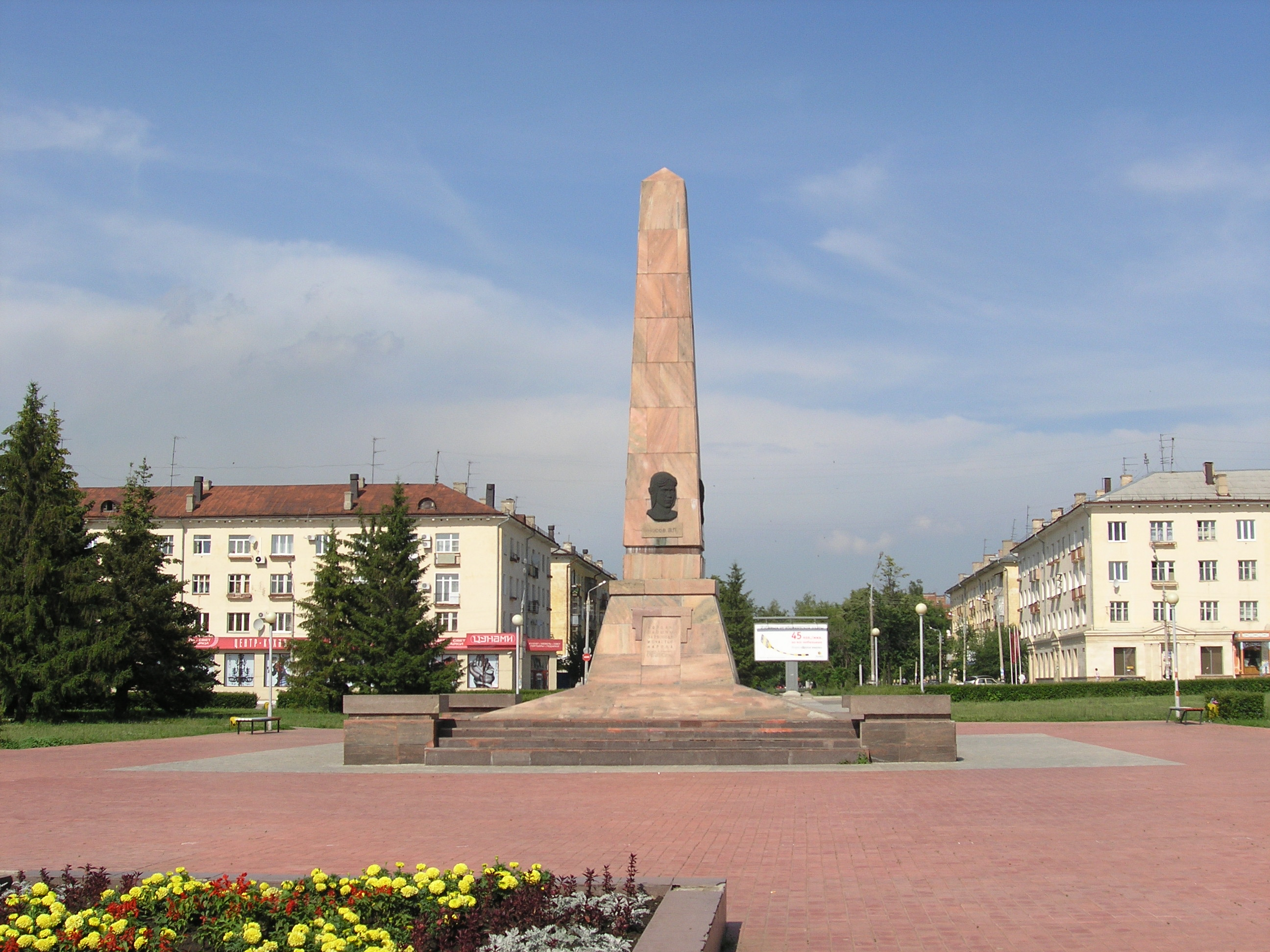
The Obelisk of Glory stands at the center of Liberty Square

Liberty Square (Russian: Площадь Свободы) is a park in the Russian city of Tolyatti. It is bounded on the northeast by Karl Marx Street. It is also, by extension, the name used for the neighborhood around the park. Monuments of cultural and historical interest in or around Liberty Square include:

- The Obelisk of Glory, erected in 1958 at the center of Liberty Square as a memorial to soldiers, sailors, and airmen of WWII (called, in Russia, the Great Patriotic War) and also Vasily Banykin, a mayor of Tolyatti martyred in 1918.
- The Tree of Remembrance – planted in Liberty Square on May 9, 1990, with a stone plaque inscribed: "As a living link between generations we leave to you, our descendants, this tree, in memory of the innumerable sufferings of the victims of war and repression. People! Remember this! — War and Labor Veterans of Tolyatti / Stavropol — May 9, 1990"
- Karl Marx Monument Dedicated on May 5, 1989, at the intersection of Youth Boulevard and Karl Marx Street, cater-corner across the street from the north corner of Liberty Square (53°30′52.18″N 49°24′35.17″E). The monument is a bust of Karl Marx, made of aluminum stained to look like bronze, 91 centimetres (36 in) high. It stands on a pink granite pedestal 2.3 metres (7.5 ft) tall, which in turn is on a concrete base. The architects were V. Z. Gurevich and A. V. Medvedkov, the sculptor was Igor Burmistenko, and the restoration was done by Victor Formin. It was a gift to the city from Burmistenko. In August 2007, hooligans stole the bust. It was recovered, but badly damaged, and was thought to be a total loss. However, the metal specialist Formin, in honor of his friend Burmistenko (who was dead by then) and working without compensation except for materials, undertook to painstakingly restore the bust sufficient for it to form the basis for a new casting. The new bust was dedicated on November 1, 2007. It is equipped with vandal-proof features.

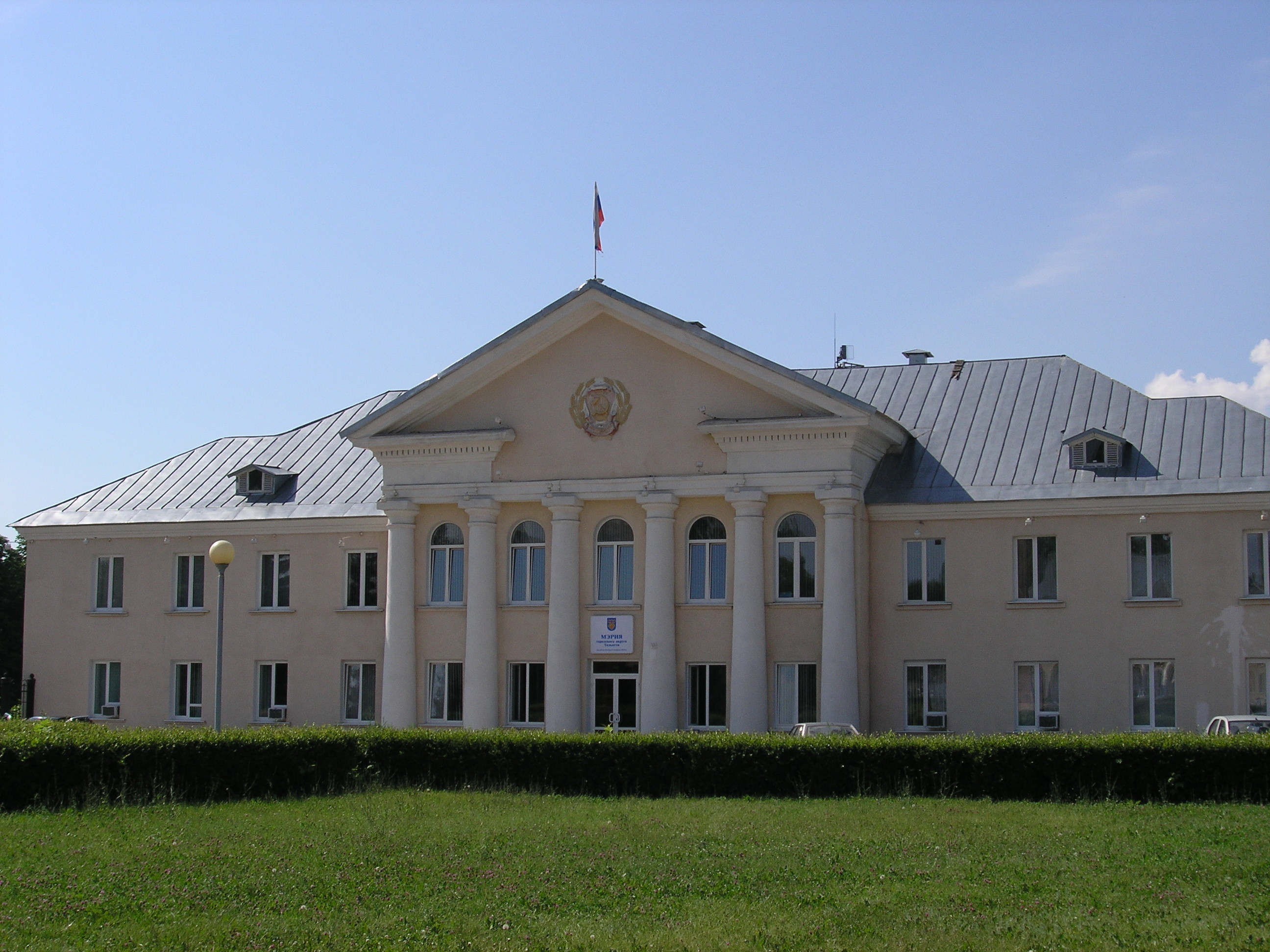
Tolyatti City Hall

- Tolyatti City Hall at 4 Liberty Square stands across Youth Boulevard from the north side of Liberty Square. It originally was built to house the city's Communist Party executive committee. On the pediment is the emblem of the Russian Soviet Federative Socialist Republic, the facade is decorated with six massive Doric half-columns, and there are arched windows on the second floor. It was originally planned to decorate the facade with stucco embellishments, but because of a contemporary movement for simplification (some might say oversimplification) in Soviet architecture these were eliminated. In the 1980s, the appearance of the building was changed to fit the mode of those times; the historical appearance of the building was restored in 2001. At night, the building is illuminated with colored spotlights in the colors of the Russian flag.

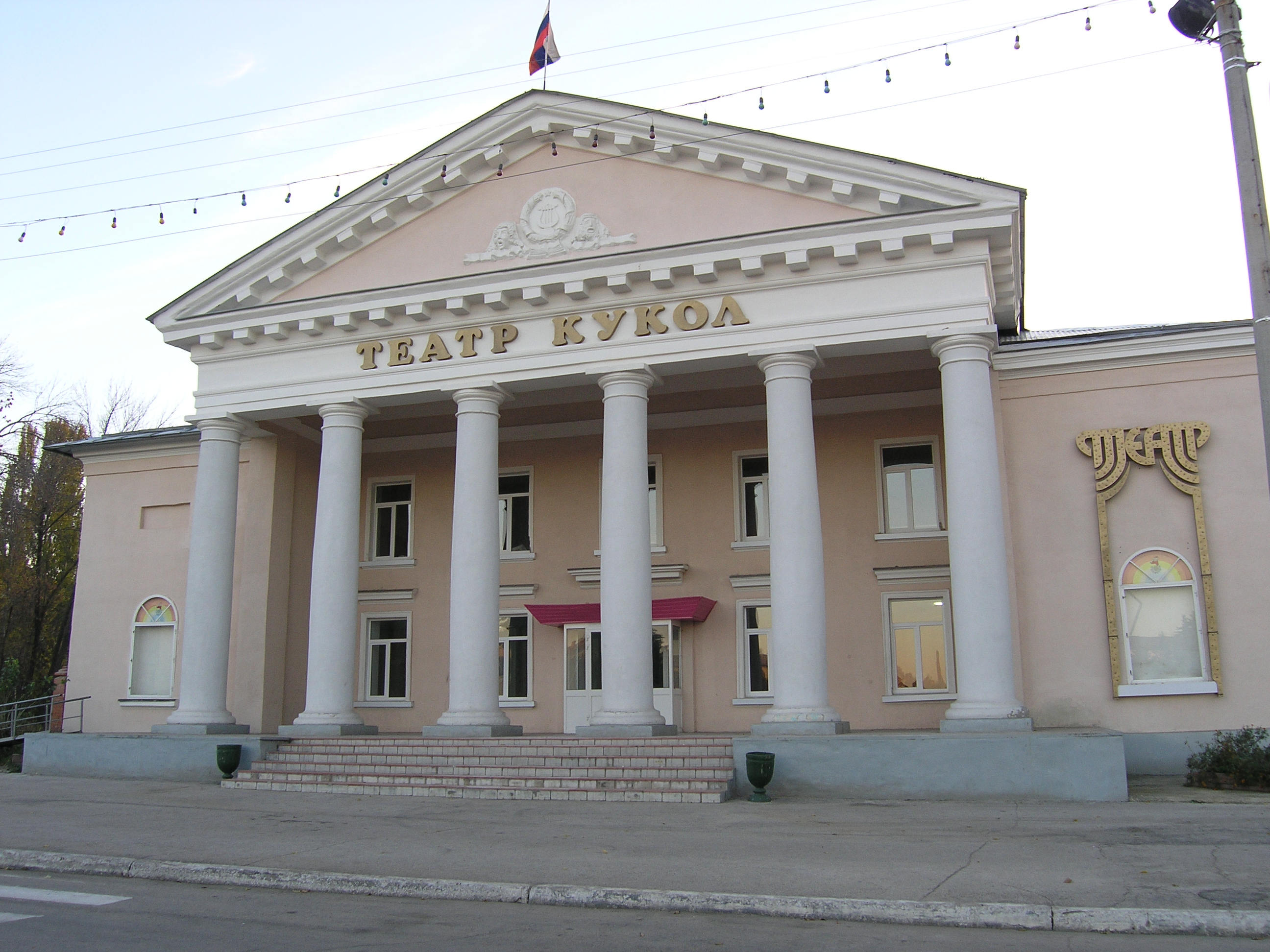
The Puppet Theater

- The Puppet Theater, at 2 Liberty Square was originally built in 1958 as the House of Culture. The 400-seat (later expanded to 500-seat) theater features six full Doric columns in front and stucco embellishments on the pediment. In 1983 the building was, on the initiative of Soviet puppeteering titan Sergey Obraztsov, turned into the permanent home of the Pilgrim puppet theater troupe which had been founded in 1973 by Roman Renz, director of the Kuibyshev Puppet Theater and a People's Artist of Russia; the Pilgrim troupe's first artistic director had been Savely Uralov, succeeded in 1980 by Alexander Rosengarten, who embarked the troupe on tours of cities throughout the Soviet Union (it continued to tour widely in the Russian Federation). The building, which continues to house the Pilgrim troupe, was renovated in 2007 and has the status of a protected monument of historical and architectural value.

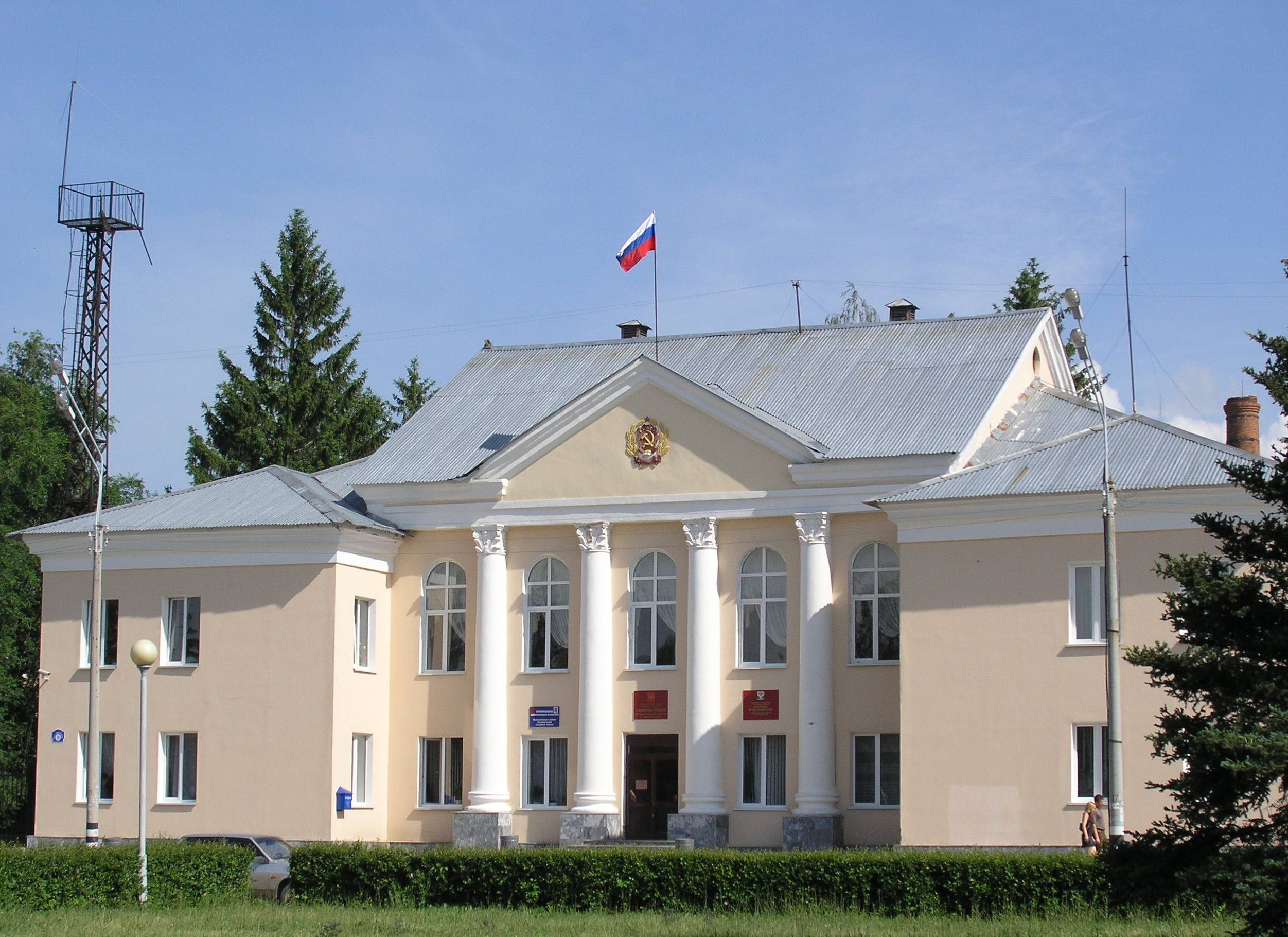
Stavropolsky District Administrative Building

- The Stavropol District Administrative Building at 9 Liberty Square is the headquarters of Stavropol District, (Note: A Russian raion (district) is a subdivision of an oblast (province) and is roughly equivalent in magnitude to an American county, more or less.) although Tolyatti itself, being an independent city, is not actually in Stavropolsky District. The building was erected in 1957-1958 to a 1956 design by the precursor to Lengiprogor (Russian: Ленгипрогор), (Note: Lengiprogor did not actually come into existence until 1959 when GiproKommunStroem was merged into Giprogor Russian Institute of Urban and Investment Development). The design was the outcome of the struggle to eliminate architectural extravagances, which was won by the simplifiers, resulting in particular in a lack of stucco embellishment. The building does feature four Corinthian columns.
