= Aleksey Naumov (officer) =

Soviet soldier, member of a famous tank crew

- Алексей Фёдорович Наумов; Aleksey Fyodorovich Naumov
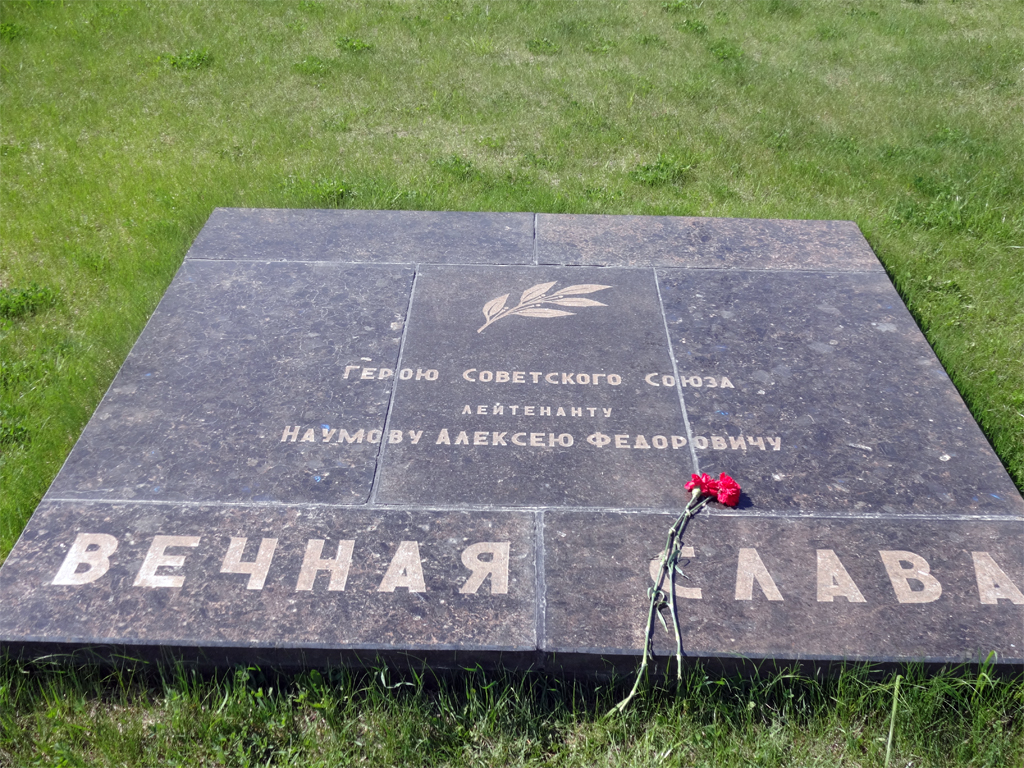
- Memorial plate to Alexey Naumov in Mamayev Kurgan
- Born: 1 March 1923; Yaroslavl, RSFSR
- Died: 21 January 1943 (aged 19); Novaya Nadezhda, Stalingrad oblast, RSFSR, USSR
- Military career
- Allegiance: Soviet Union
- Branch: Red Army
- Service years: 1941–1943
- Rank: Lieutenant
- Units: 344th Tank Battalion, 91st Tank Brigade
- Commands: KV-1
- Conflicts: World War II; Battle of Stalingrad †
- Awards: Hero of the Soviet Union

Aleksey Fyodorovich Naumov (Russian: Алексей Фёдорович Наумов; 1 March 1923, Yaroslavl – 21 January 1943, Novaya Nadezhda) was a Soviet tank commander during World War II. Naumov graduated from the Chelyabinsk Tank School in November 1942 and was soon assigned to the Don Front to command a KV-1 heavy tank. Attached to the 344th Tank Battalion, he and his crew distinguished themselves on 21 January 1943, during the final stages of the Battle of Stalingrad. Soviet forces had been attempting to take the Pitomnik Airfield and the farmstead of Novaya Nadezhda, near Stalingrad. When he crew ran out of ammunition, German soldiers poured gasoline on his tank and set it on fire, killing the entire crew. When Soviet forces took Novaya Nadezhda, the remains of Naumov and his men were buried nearby. He and several other members of his crew were posthumously awarded the title Hero of the Soviet Union.

== Biography ==
Naumov was born on 1 March 1923 in Yaroslavl to a working-class Russian family. He graduated in June 1941 from Yaroslavl's Secondary School No. 6, since renamed in honor of the revolutionary Nikolai Podvoisky. As a child, he was fond of football, chess, and literature.

=== Service in the Red Army ===
Naumov was drafted into the Red Army in July 1941 by the Krasnoperekopsky military district authority and sent to the Chelyabinsk Higher Tank Command School. He graduated in an accelerated program in November 1942 and was made a lieutenant and joined the 91st Tank Brigade at their muster point near Gorky (now Nizhny Novgorod). Here Naumov was assigned as a commander of a KV-1 in the 344th Tank Battalion. His tank was part of the Tambov Kolkhoz Tank Column, named for a kolkhoz at Tambov whose workers had funded the tanks' construction. After a brief training period the brigade, under the command of Colonel Ivan Yakubovsky, was assigned to the 65th Army as part of the Don Front.

Naumov participated in the final stages of the Battle of Stalingrad, fighting in five tank assaults. On 13–14 January 1943, his crew destroyed two German tanks, an artillery battery, four mortars, five machine guns, seven bunkers, five miscellaneous vehicles, and killed about 120 German military personnel. In another engagement, his tank was immobilized by German forces but brought back into operation by Naumov and his driver, Pavel Smirnov, under covering fire by Soviet machine guns and artillery. For these actions, Naumov and Smirnov were awarded the Order of the Red Star by Front Commander Konstantin Rokossovsky. Naumov's sergeant, Pyotr Noritsyn, and radio operator, Nikolai Vyalykh, were awarded the Medal for Courage.

=== Battle for Novaya Nadezhda ===
By January 1943, the supplies for the surrounded German 6th Army were being flown in at the Pitomnik Airfield. To close that channel, Rokossovsky ordered the 91st Tank Brigade to take the airfield. To prepare for an assault on the airfield, the 344th Tank Battalion was sent against Bezymyannogo hill and the Novaya Nadezhda farmstead, both on the airfield's outskirts. During five hours of intense combat on 21 January, Naumov and his crew destroyed five tanks, 24 armored vehicles, 19 artillery pieces and mortars, 15 machine gun nests, 5 bunkers, and up to a hundred German soldiers.

Continued fighting resulted in the tank's immobilization. The crew stubbornly refused to surrender, so the Germans poured gasoline on it once Naumov had run out of ammunition and set it on fire. The entire crew – Naumov, Smirnov, Noritsyn, Vyalykh, and Ganus – burned to death inside their tank, singing the Internationale. On 23 September 1943, he was posthumously declared a Hero of the Soviet Union by decree of the Presidium of the Supreme Soviet.
