= Economy of Ukraine =

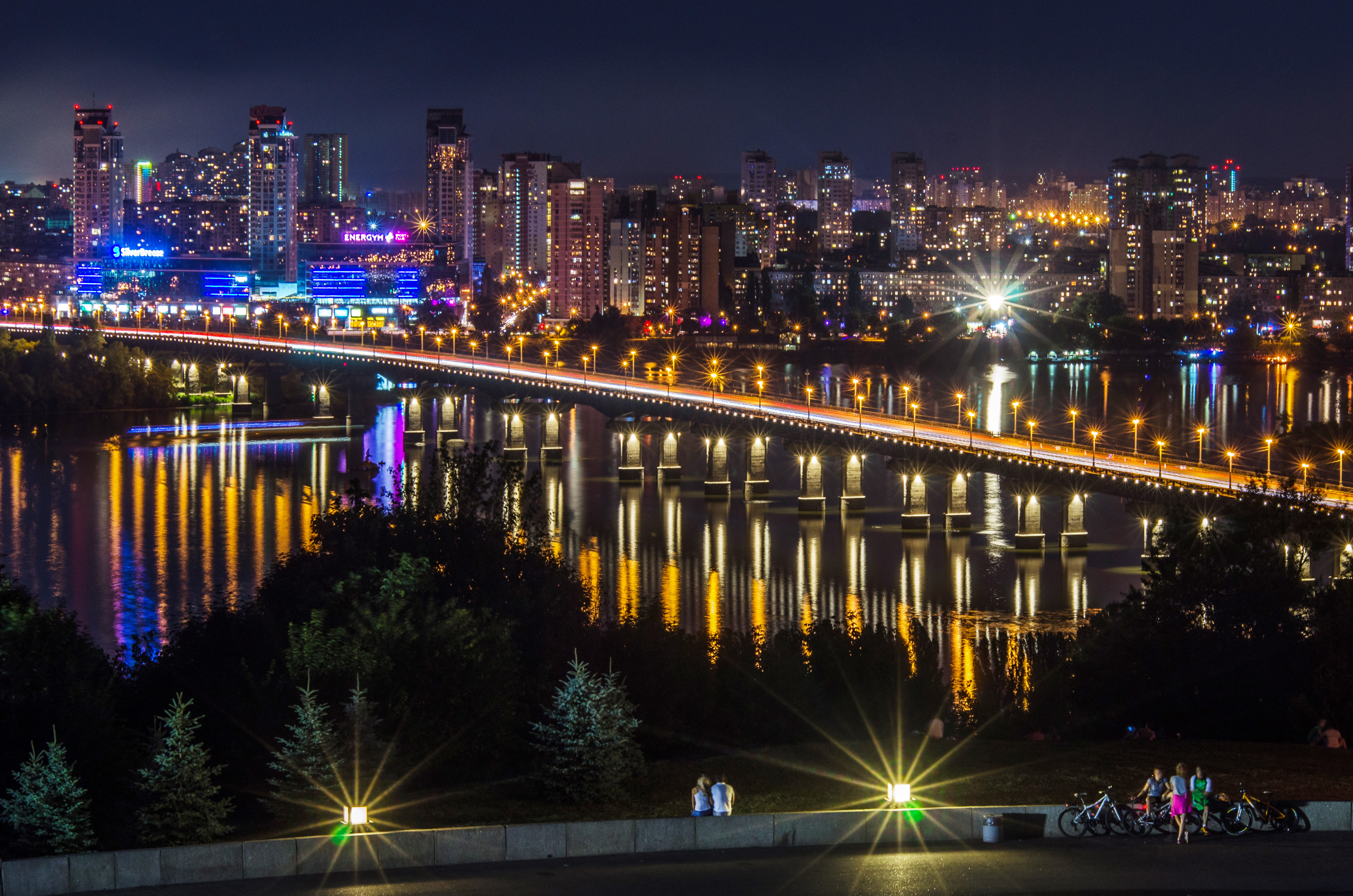
- Kyiv, the financial capital of Ukraine
- Currency: Ukrainian hryvnia
- Fiscal year: Calendar year
- Trade organizations: GUAM, WTO, CISFTA, DCFTA (EU), BSEC
- Country group: Developing country; Upper-middle income economy

Statistics
- Population: ▼32,862,000 (2025)
- GDP: ▲$229.406 billion (nominal, 2026f); ▲$720.723 billion (PPP, 2026f)
- GDP rank: 55th (nominal, 2026); 45th (PPP, 2026)
- GDP growth: ▲1.0% (2026f)
- GDP per capita: ▲$7,075 (nominal, 2026f); ▲$22,229 (PPP, 2026f)
- GDP per capita rank: 107th (nominal, 2026); 92nd (PPP, 2025)
- GDP by sector: agriculture: 12.2%; industry: 28.6%; services: 60%; (2017 est.)
- Inflation (CPI): 8.9% (2026f)
- Population below national poverty line: ▼1.3% (2018); ▲0.4% on less than $3.20/day (2020f)
- Gini coefficient: ▼25.6 low (2020, World Bank)
- Human Development Index: ▲0.779 high (2023) (100th); ▲0.715 high IHDI (2023, 63rd)
- Corruption Perceptions Index: ▲36 out of 100 points (2025, 104th rank)
- Labor force: ▼20,203,893 (2019); ▲57.1% employment rate (2018)
- Labor force by occupation: agriculture 5.8%; industry 26.5%; services 67.8%; (2014)
- Unemployment: ▼11.6% (2025f)
- Youth unemployment: ▼19.1% (2021)
- Average gross salary: ₴26,499/ €520 monthly
- Average net salary: ₴20,404/ €401 monthly
- Main industries: coal, electric power, ferrous and nonferrous metals, machinery and transport equipment, chemicals, food processing

External
- Exports: ▲$41.7 billion (2024)
- Export goods: ferrous and nonferrous metals, fuel and petroleum products, chemicals, machinery and transport equipment, food products
- Main export partners: European Union 59.5%; Poland 11.3%; Spain 6.9%; Germany 6.8%; China 5.7%; Turkey 5.3% (2024)
- Imports: ▲$70.7 billion (2024)
- Import goods: energy (mainly natural gas), machinery and equipment, chemicals
- Main import partners: European Union 50.3%; Poland 11.3%; Spain 6.9%; Germany 6.8%; China 20.3%; Turkey 6.0% (2024)
- FDI stock: ▲$67.22 billion (31 December 2017 est.); ▼ Abroad: $7.59 billion (31 December 2017 est.)
- Current account: ▼ −$3.752 billion (2018 est.)
- Gross external debt: ▼$47.9 billion (Apr 2018)

Public finance
- Government debt: ▲94% of GDP (2024)
- Foreign reserves: ▼$40.507 billion (1 Mar 2024 est.)
- Revenue: ₴1.1 trillion / €37 bil. / $39 bil. (2017)
- Spending: ₴1.1 tril. / €38 bil. / $41 bil. (2017)
- Economic aid: recipient: $0.4 billion (2006); International Monetary Fund Extended Funds Facility: $2.2 billion (1998)
- Credit rating: Standard & Poor's: CCC+/C ▼ (Domestic); CCC (Foreign); Outlook: Negative; Moody's: Ca ▼; Outlook: Stable; Fitch: CC; Outlook: N/A; Scope Ratings: SD; Outlook: N/A
- All values, unless otherwise stated, are in US dollars.

Due to heavy economic dependanceUkraine has a developing social market economy. It possesses many of the components of a major European economy, such as rich farmlands, a well-developed industrial base, highly-trained labour, and a well-funded education system. It has large mineral deposits across its landmass. Ukraine remains one of the poorest countries in Europe, which some have attributed to high corruption levels and the slow pace of economic liberalisation and institutional reform.

The nation was in an economic depression during the 1990s with hyperinflation and an output half of its predecessor state, the Ukrainian SSR. Economic growth returned in 2000, lasting until the 2008–2009 Ukrainian financial crisis. The country fell into another recession in 2013, with stricter border and customs control by Russia straining their exports. Its relationship with Russia has significantly influenced its economic development. The 2014 Russian annexation of Crimea and war in Donbas severely damaged two of Ukraine's most industrial regions. The Russian invasion of Ukraine in 2022 suppressed economic growth by 18.9% that year, with the economy rebounding from 2023 to 2026. Many of the GDP comes from the development needed for actual combat. Military expertise in legacy weapons systems and domestic industry has contributed to the rapid growth of arms production, with exports and international cooperation offering a potential source of foreign revenue.

== History ==
=== Before 1917 ===
Geography has long influenced the economy of the Ukrainian lands. Rich fertile soils (such as chernozem areas) made the area a "breadbasket": for ancient Greece as well as for early modern Europe. The maintenance of trade corridors – the route from the Varangians to the Greeks and access through the Straits to the Mediterranean world – became important. Mineral resources encouraged industrialisation – notably in the Donbas – from the 19th century onwards.

The lack of secure borders meant repeated interruptions in economic development. Steppe nomads and other conquerors – Cumans, Mongols, Tatars for example, sometimes saw plundering as more important than fostering economic development. In the 16th to 18th centuries, the wastelands of the Wild Fields left much of Ukraine as an area of tentatively militarised outposts, prior to tsarist Russia's extension of its power into the region in the 17th and 18th centuries.

=== 1991 to 2000 ===
On 24 August 1991, Ukraine established its independence from the Soviet Union. The new state's economy suffered huge output declines and soaring inflation in the following years. Ukraine saw hyperinflation in the early 1990s because of a lack of access to financial markets and massive monetary expansion to finance government spending, while output declined sharply this was catastrophic for the economy because it undid decades of hard-fought economic progress and people became poorer. Huge output declines and soaring inflation was at the time common to most former Soviet republics, but Ukraine was among the hardest hit by these problems.

In response to hyperinflation the National Bank of Ukraine replaced the national currency, the karbovanets, with the hryvnia in September 1996 and pledged to keep it stable in relation to the U.S. dollar. The currency remained unstable through the late 1990s, particularly during the 1998 Russian financial crisis.

Deep recession during the 1990s led to a relatively high poverty rate, but beginning in 2001, seven straight years of economic growth, raised the living standard for most citizens. A World Bank report in 2007 noted that: "Ukraine recorded one of the sharpest declines in poverty of any transition economy in recent years. The poverty rate, measured against an absolute poverty line, fell from a high of 32% in 2001 to 8% in 2005." The UN noted that Ukraine had overcome absolute poverty, and that there was only relative poverty in 2009.

=== 2000 to 2014 ===
Ukraine stabilised by the early 2000s. The year 2000 saw the first year of economic growth since Ukraine's independence. The economy continued to grow thanks to a 50% growth in exports between 2000 and 2008 – mainly exports from the traditional industries of metals, metallurgy, engineering, chemicals, and food. Between 2001 and 2008, metals and chemicals prices boomed because of fast international economic growth, while the price of natural gas imported from Russia remained low.

Monetisation also helped to drive the economic boom Ukraine experienced between 2000 and 2008. Attracted in part by relatively high interest-rates, foreign cash was injected into Ukraine's economy and money supply grew rapidly: from 2001 to 2010 broad, money increased at an annual rate of 35%. In 2006 and 2007, credit growth averaged 73%.

An effect of this was that Ukrainian assets began to look like a large economic bubble and high inflation started to damage Ukraine's export competitiveness. The ratio of credit to GDP grew extremely fast – from 7% to almost 80% over just several years. From 2000 to 2007, Ukraine's real growth averaged 7.4%. This growth was driven by domestic demand: orientation toward consumption, other structural change, and financial development.

Domestic demand grew in constant prices by almost 15% annually. It was supported by expansionary—procyclical—fiscal policy. Ukraine benefited from very low labour costs, slightly lower tariffs, and high prices of its main export goods, but at the same time faced notably higher non-tariff barriers. Russia has not charged Ukraine below-world-market prices for natural gas since the end of 2008. This led to various Russia–Ukraine gas disputes.

Ukraine suffered severely in the economic crisis of 2008. Because of it Ukraine experienced a drought in capital flows. The hryvnia, which had been pegged at a rate of 5:1 to the U.S. dollar, was devalued to 8:1, and was stabilised at that ratio until the beginning of 2014. In 2008, Ukraine's economy ranked 45th in the world according to GDP (nominal), with a total nominal GDP of US$188 billion, and nominal per capita GDP of US$3,900. There was 3% unemployment at the end of 2008. Over the first 9 months of 2009, unemployment averaged 9.4%. The final official unemployment rates for 2009 and 2010 were 8.8% and 8.4%, although the CIA World Factbook notes a "large number of unregistered or underemployed workers". Ukraine's GDP fell by 15% in 2009.

The Ukrainian economy recovered in the first quarter of 2010 due to the recovery of the world economy and increasing prices for metals. Ukraine's real GDP growth in 2010 was 4.3%, leading to a per capita PPP GDP of US$6,700. In 2011, Ukrainian politicians estimated that 40% of Ukraine's economy was a shadow economy.

In the summer of 2013, Ukrainian exports to Russia fell substantially due to Russia's stricter customs controls.

By October 2013, the Ukrainian economy had become stuck in recession. Moody's downgraded Ukraine's credit rating to Caa1 (poor quality and very high credit risk) in September 2013. At the time, swap markets rated Ukraine's default probability over the next five years at 50%. In 2013, Ukraine saw no growth in GDP.

=== Post-Euromaidan: 2014 to 2022 ===
Due to the loss of Ukraine's largest trading partner, Russia, over the annexation of Crimea in March 2014, and exacerbated by the war in Donbas which started in April 2014 (Note: In April 2014 pro-Russian protest escalated into the war in Donbas between the Ukrainian government and the separatist forces of the self-declared Donetsk People's Republic and Luhansk People's Republic.) Ukraine's economy shrank by 6.8% in 2014. It had been expected to decline by 8%. A Ukrainian government report stated early in February 2016 that Ukraine's economy had shrunk by 10.4% in 2015. For 2015, the National Bank of Ukraine had expected a further decline of 11.6%, and the World Bank anticipated a 12% shrinkage. The World Bank forecast growth of 1% in 2016.

Early in February 2014, the National Bank of Ukraine changed the hryvnia into a fluctuating/floating currency in an attempt to meet IMF requirements and to try to enforce a stable price for the currency in the Forex market. In 2014 and 2015, the hryvnia lost about 70% of its value against the U.S. dollar.

The IMF agreed to a four-year loan programme worth about $17.5 billion in eight tranches over 2015 and 2016, subject to conditions which involved economic reforms. However, due to lack of progress on reforms, only two tranches worth $6.7 billion were paid in 2015. A third tranche of $1.7 billion was provisionally scheduled in June 2016 subject to the bringing into law of 19 further reform measures. Some western analysts believed that large foreign loans were not encouraging reform, but enabling the corrupt extraction of funds out of the country.

Since December 2015, Ukraine has refused to pay and hence de facto defaults on a $3 billion debt payment to Russia that formed part of a December 2013 Ukrainian–Russian action plan.

The turnover of retail trade in Ukraine in 2014 shrank by 8.6% (from 2013) and shrank by 20.7% in 2015 (from 2014). Ukraine saw a 30.9% decline in exports in 2015, mainly because of a sharp decline in production output in Donetsk Oblast and in Luhansk Oblast (the two regions of the Donbas). These two regions were responsible for 40.6% of the total export-decline rate. Before the war they had been two of the more industrial oblasts of Ukraine.

According to the Ministry of Economic Development and Trade, Ukraine had a surplus in its balance of payments in January–November 2015 of $566 million and has had a trade deficit of $11.046 billion during the same period in 2014. On 31 December 2015, Ukraine's public debt stood at 79% of its GDP. It had shrunk $4.324 billion in 2015 to end up at $65.488 billion. But calculated in hryvnia, the debt had grown by 42.78%. In 2015, the Ministry of Social Policy of Ukraine rated 20–25% of Ukrainian households as poor.

$2.526 billion entered the Ukrainian economy via remittances in 2015, 34.9% less than in 2014. $431 million was sent from Ukraine to elsewhere using remittances. In January 2016, Bloomberg rated Ukraine's economy as the 41st most innovative in the world, down from 33rd in January 2015.

In May 2016, the IMF mission chief for Ukraine, Ron van Rood, stated that reduction of corruption was a key test for continued international support. In February 2016, historian Andrew Wilson assessed progress in reducing corruption as poor as of 2016. Aivaras Abromavičius, Ukraine's then-Minister of Economy and Trade, resigned in February 2016, citing ingrained corruption. In October of the same year, a survey of potential foreign investors conducted by Dragon Capital identified corruption and lack of trust in the judiciary as the largest obstacles to investment.

Late in July 2016, the State Statistics Service of Ukraine reported that, compared with June 2015, real wages had increased by 17.3%. Simultaneously the National Bank of Ukraine reported a $406 million surplus in Ukraine's January–June 2016 balance of payments against a deficit of $1.3 billion in the same period in 2015. According to Ukraine's State Statistics Service, inflation in 2016 came down to 13.9%; while it had stood at 43.3% in 2015 and at 24.9% in 2014.

The Economist has compared the severity of Ukraine's recession to that of the Greek recession in 2011–2012 – pointing to Ukraine experiencing an 8–9% decline in GDP from 2014 to 2015 and Greece experiencing an 8.1% decline of GDP in 2011–2012, and noted that not all areas of Ukraine were equally effected by the economic downturn. Donetsk and Luhansk (the conflict zone) saw industrial production falling by 32% and 42% respectively. On the other hand, Lviv, located over 1000 km from the conflict, posted the largest jump in employment in the nation.

The economy of Ukraine has overcome the severe crisis caused by armed conflict in the eastern part of country. A 200% devaluation of the hryvnia in 2014–2015 made Ukrainian goods and services cheaper and more competitive. In 2016, for the first time since 2010, the economy grew by more than 2%. A 2017 World Bank statement projected growth of 2% in 2017, of 3.5% in 2018, and of 4% in 2019 and 2020. Inflation in Ukraine in 2017 was 13.7% (12.4% in 2016).

Since about 2015, there has been a growing number of Ukrainians working in the European Union, particularly Poland. Eurostat reported that 662,000 Ukrainians received EU residence permits in 2017, with 585,439 issued by Poland. The head of the National Security and Defence Council of Ukraine has estimated that up to 9 million Ukrainians work abroad for some part of the year, and 3.2 million have regular full-time work abroad with most not planning to return. World Bank statistics show that money remittances back to Ukraine have roughly doubled from 2015 to 2018, worth about 4% of GDP.

In Q1 2019, China became Ukraine's largest trading partner, replacing Russia. In Q3 of 2019, real GDP grew by 4.2%. The main driving factors include: increased purchasing power of the population in conditions of increase of the level of wages (during nine months of 2019 real wages increased by 9.5%); high level of business activity and preservation of investment activity, which stimulated mainly the development of construction, in particular, of industrial and transport infrastructure facilities; active consumer lending; maintaining the high dynamics of agricultural development; favourable price situation on selected world commodity markets for domestic exports and others. Ukraine made its largest payment on debt in 2019 at $1.1 billion.

In 2019, Fitch Ratings, a global leader in credit ratings and research, upgraded Ukraine's Long-Term foreign and National Currency Issuer Default Ratings (IDR) from "B−" to "B" and improved the outlook on the credit rating from stable to positive. Ukraine has demonstrated timely access to fiscal and external financing, improving macroeconomic stability, and declining public indebtedness.

Ukraine moved up seven positions in the annual World Bank Doing Business 2020 report. Prudent macroeconomic management helped reduce inflation and interest rates in 2019. Inflation eased to 4.1% at the end of 2019 and 2.4% in February 2020.

In 2020, Ukraine's GDP fell by 4.4%, due to the COVID-19 pandemic. On 27 October 2020, the Constitutional Court of Ukraine ruled that anti-corruption legislation, including the mandatory electronic declaration of income, was unconstitutional. President Volodymyr Zelenskyy warned that if the Ukrainian parliament did not restore these anti-corruption laws, foreign aid, loans and visa-free travel to the European Union were at risk. The governor of the National Bank of Ukraine reported that Ukraine will not receive the scheduled $700 million IMF loan before the end of 2020 because of the issue. IMF assessment teams had not visited Kyiv for eight months, which is necessary for further IMF loan tranches to be released. In February 2021, economist Anders Åslund wrote "for months, senior Ukrainian officials have been claiming that the Ukrainian government has done everything the [IMF] could possibly demand" but "this happy talk was always detached from reality", and the relationship with the IMF remains critical.

On 21 July 2022, Ukraine devalued the Ukrainian hryvnia by 25% against the U.S. dollar due to the economic impact of ongoing Russian invasion of Ukraine, to eliminate currency speculation and to improve the international competitiveness of business. The previous day it requested a two-year payment freeze on international bonds; in 2020 it had $130 billion of external debt. When the 2022 Russian invasion began, Ukraine's economy was predicted by the IMF to shrink by up to 35%. Despite improvements, as in Moldova corruption in Ukraine remains an obstacle to joining the EU; the country was rated 104th out of 180 in the Corruption Perceptions Index for 2023.

=== Russian invasion of Ukraine: 2022 to present ===
Following the onset of the Russian-Ukrainian War in 2022, Ukraine's GDP declined by nearly 30%. Despite economic growth in 2023 and 2024, the economy remains smaller than it was before the war. In 2023, GDP increased by 5.3%, and in 2024 by 3.6%. The International Monetary Fund forecasts that Ukraine's GDP growth will slow to between 2% and 3% in 2025, citing challenges such as labor shortages, damage to energy infrastructure, and the ongoing war.

In April 2026, the National Bank of Ukraine forecast that real GDP growth in 2026 would be 1.3% and inflation 9.4%; it kept its bank rate at 15%. Due to heavy economic dependance on external donors, such as the United States, the IMF, and the European Union, Ukrainian economist and banker Kyrylo Shevchenko coined the term donornomics to describe the economic model of the country during the Russo-Ukrainian War. The Kyiv Post stated that the Western economies were financing Ukraine through the war by about $100 billion a year. In July 2026, Ukraine and Russia started attacking each other's ports and shipping using those ports in the Sea of Azov and Black Sea, which had been largely protected by the Black Sea Grain Initiative agreement, leading to the closure of the Ukrainian deep-water ports near Odesa on 23 July majorly impacting exports. In August 2026, President Zelenskyy asked allies for an additional €23 billion of funding that year for a military spending shortfall, and in October 2026 asked for at least €70 billion from the EU toward the €155 billion expected cost of the war in 2027.

In its November 2026 economic forecast, the European Commission projected Ukraine's real GDP growth at 0.6% in 2026 and 0.3% in 2027, compared with 1.8% in 2025. Average consumer price inflation was projected at 9.1% in 2026 and 9.3% in 2027. The Commission forecast general government deficits of 14.1% and 16.9% of GDP, respectively, and gross public debt of 90.4% and 97.4% of GDP. These debt projections exclude financing under the G7's Extraordinary Revenue Acceleration (ERA) initiative and the EU's Ukraine Support Loan. Including both, the Commission estimated public debt at 135.9% of GDP in 2026 and 160.0% in 2027.

== Economic data ==
Ukraine is subdivided into nine economic regions: Carpathian, Northwestern, Podillia, Capital, Central-Ukrainian, Northeastern, Black-Sea-Coastal, Trans-Dnipro, and Donetsk. Those regions were redrawn from the three Soviet economic regions of the Ukrainian SSR: Donetsk-TransDnieper, Southwestern, and Southern.

=== Main economic indicators ===
The following table shows the main economic indicators in 1992–2023. Inflation below 5% is in green.

Year	GDP (in bn. US$PPP)	GDP per capita (in US$ PPP)	GDP (in bn. US$nominal)	GDP per capita (in US$ nominal)	GDP growth (real)	Inflation rate (in %)	Unemployment (in %)	Government debt (in % of GDP)
1992	331.1	6,382.7	22.2	427.9	n/a	n/a	n/a	n/a
1993	▼290.8	▼5,623.0	▲35.0	▲677.3	▼-14.2%	▲4734.9%	n/a	n/a
1994	▼229.0	▼4,463.7	▲38.0	▲741.0	▼-22.9%	▲891.2%	n/a	n/a
1995	▼205.3	▼4,034.9	▲38.3	▲752.3	▼-12.2%	▲376.7%	▼14.8%	n/a
1996	▼188.1	▼3,732.6	▲46.1	▲914.3	▼-10.0%	▲80.2%	▼10.0%	n/a
1997	▼185.6	▼3,714.5	▲51.9	▲1,037.9	▼-3.0%	▲15.9%	▼9.8%	▼28.9%
1998	▼184.2	▲3,716.9	▼43.3	▼874.3	▼-1.9%	▲10.6%	▲11.3%	▲46.5%
1999	▲186.4	▲3,794.6	▼32.7	▼665.0	▼-0.2%	▲22.7%	▲11.9%	▲59.0%
2000	▲201.8	▲4,147.7	▼32.3	▼664.4	▲5.9%	▲28.2%	▼11.5%	▼43.8%
2001	▲224.5	▲4,654.7	▲37.9	▲784.9	▲8.8%	▲12.0%	▼10.8%	▼36.7%
2002	▲240.1	▲5,021.3	▲42.3	▲885.3	▲5.3%	▲0.8%	▼9.6%	▼33.6%
2003	▲268.1	▲5,651.9	▲50.1	▲1,055.9	▲9.5%	▲5.2%	▼9.1%	▼29.4%
2004	▲307.8	▲6,535.5	▲64.8	▲1,374.8	▲11.8%	▲9.0%	▼8.6%	▼24.8%
2005	▲327.3	▲7,001.6	▲86.0	▲1,839.5	▲3.1%	▲13.5%	▼7.2%	▼17.7%
2006	▲363.1	▲7,813.6	▲107.8	▲2,319.3	▲7.6%	▲9.1%	▼6.8%	▼14.8%
2007	▲403.5	▲8,734.2	▲143.3	▲3,101.4	▲8.2%	▲12.8%	▼6.4%	▼12.3%
2008	▲420.2	▲9,142.8	▲181.3	▲3,944.7	▲2.2%	▲25.2%	▲6.4%	▲20.4%
2009	▼359.1	▼7,842.9	▼117.1	▼2,557.3	▼-15.1%	▲15.9%	▲8.8%	▲35.4%
2010	▲378.3	▲8,296.0	▲136.0	▲2,982.8	▲4.1%	▲9.4%	▼8.1%	▲40.6%
2011	▲407.2	▲8,959.2	▲163.2	▲3,589.6	▲5.5%	▲8.0%	▼7.9%	▼36.9%
2012	▲426.0	▲9,388.8	▲175.7	▲3,872.5	▲0.2%	▲0.6%	▼7.5%	▲37.5%
2013	▲486.4	▲10,749.4	▲179.6	▲3,968.9	▲0%	▼-0.3%	▼7.2%	▲40.5%
2014	▼462.0	▲10,804.3	▼130.6	▼3,053.6	▼-6.6%	▲12.1%	▲9.3%	▲70.3%
2015	▼435.5	▼10,224.9	▼90.5	▼2,124.3	▼-9.8%	▲48.7%	▼9.1%	▲79.5%
2016	▲475.7	▲11,215.9	▲93.3	▲2,200.0	▲2.4%	▲13.9%	▲9.5%	▲79.5%
2017	▲504.2	▲11,942.8	▲112.1	▲2,655.7	▲2.4%	▲14.4%	▲9.7%	▼71.6%
2018	▲534.2	▲12,725.0	▲130.9	▲3,118.3	▲3.5%	▲10.9%	▼9.0%	▼60.4%
2019	▲561.2	▲13,447.4	▲154.0	▲3,690.1	▲3.2%	▲7.9%	▼8.5%	▼50.5%
2020	▼547.3	▼13,213.6	▲156.6	▲3,780.1	▼-3.7%	▲2.7%	▲9.2%	▲60.5%
2021	▲591.5	▲14,427.9	▲199.8	▲4,874.3	▲3.4%	▲9.4%	▲9.8%	▼48.9%
2022	▼449.0	▼12,886.2	▼160.5	▼4,606.8	▼-29.1%	▲20.2%	▲24.5%	▲78.5%
2023	▲474.8	▲14,304.9	▲173.4	▲5,224.6	▲2.0%	▲17.7%	▼19.4%	▲88.2%

Real GDP per capita growth in 2024 was 2.5%.

=== List of major private owned companies, not considering banks and insurance companies ===
Rank	Company	Home city	Revenue (₴M), 2020	Profit (₴M), 2020
1.	Metinvest	Mariupol	309,302	12,960
2.	ATB-Market	Dnipro	123,864	5,769
3.	Kernel	Kyiv	118,667	5,553
4.	DTEK	Kyiv	116,046	−13,895
5.	Fozzy Group	Kyiv	80,167	n/d
6.	ArcelorMittal Kryvyi Rih	Kryvyi Rih	63,497	741
7.	Tedis Ukraine	Odesa	54,845	244
8.	Mironivsky Hliboproduct	Kyiv	51,516	−3,547
9.	Epicentr K	Kyiv	50,382	3,171
10.	Ferrexpo	Horishni Plavni	45,828	17,118
11.	Zaporizhstal	Zaporizhzhia	45,631	−3,678
12.	BaDM	Lviv	41,816	1,112
13.	Optima-Pharm	Kyiv	37,248	338
14.	Ukrnafta	Kyiv	35,535	4,269
15.	Ukrtatnafta	Kremenchuk	34,327	42

The 2016 Ranking of the Top 500 companies of Central and Eastern Europe by Deloitte has come up with specific features of Ukraine's economy. More than 50% of the biggest Ukrainian companies are therefore owned by local investors whereas for the whole region this number accounts only to 15,4%. Deloitte explains the difference with the low investment attractiveness for foreign investors. Furthermore, the biggest Ukrainian companies feature a considerable higher average headcount (35’600 vs. 6’600 employees) and lower productivity (EUR 47’000 revenue per employee vs. EUR 207’000 for the whole region).

=== Natural resources ===
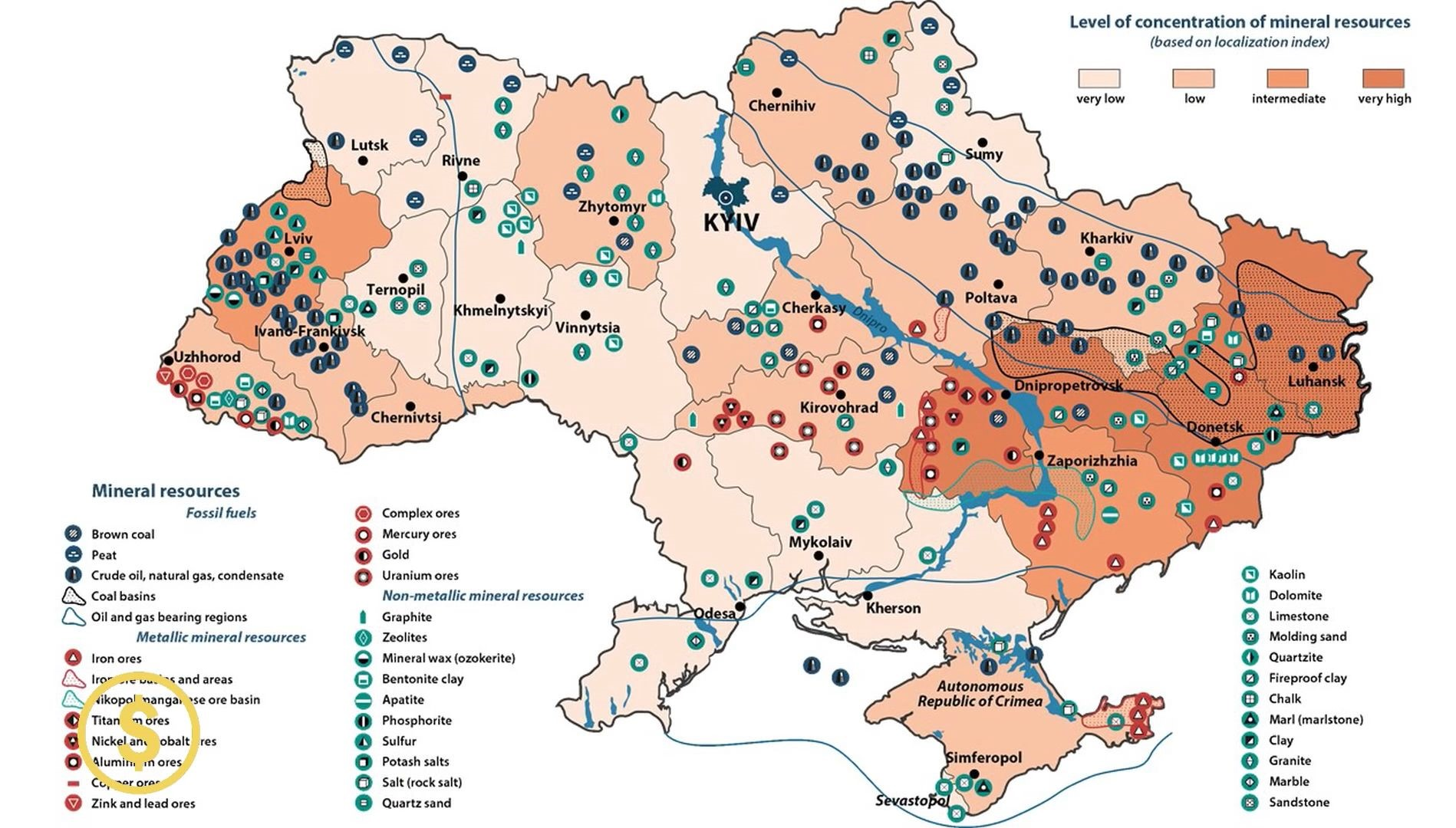
Minerals of Ukraine

- Minerals of Ukraine

Ukraine is relatively rich in natural resources, particularly in mineral deposits. Although oil and natural gas reserves in Ukraine are largely exhausted, it has other important energy sources, such as coal, hydroelectricity, and nuclear-fuel raw materials.

=== Ukrainian economy in graphics ===
GDP (PPP) of Ukraine

Ukraine's GDP (PPP) per capita

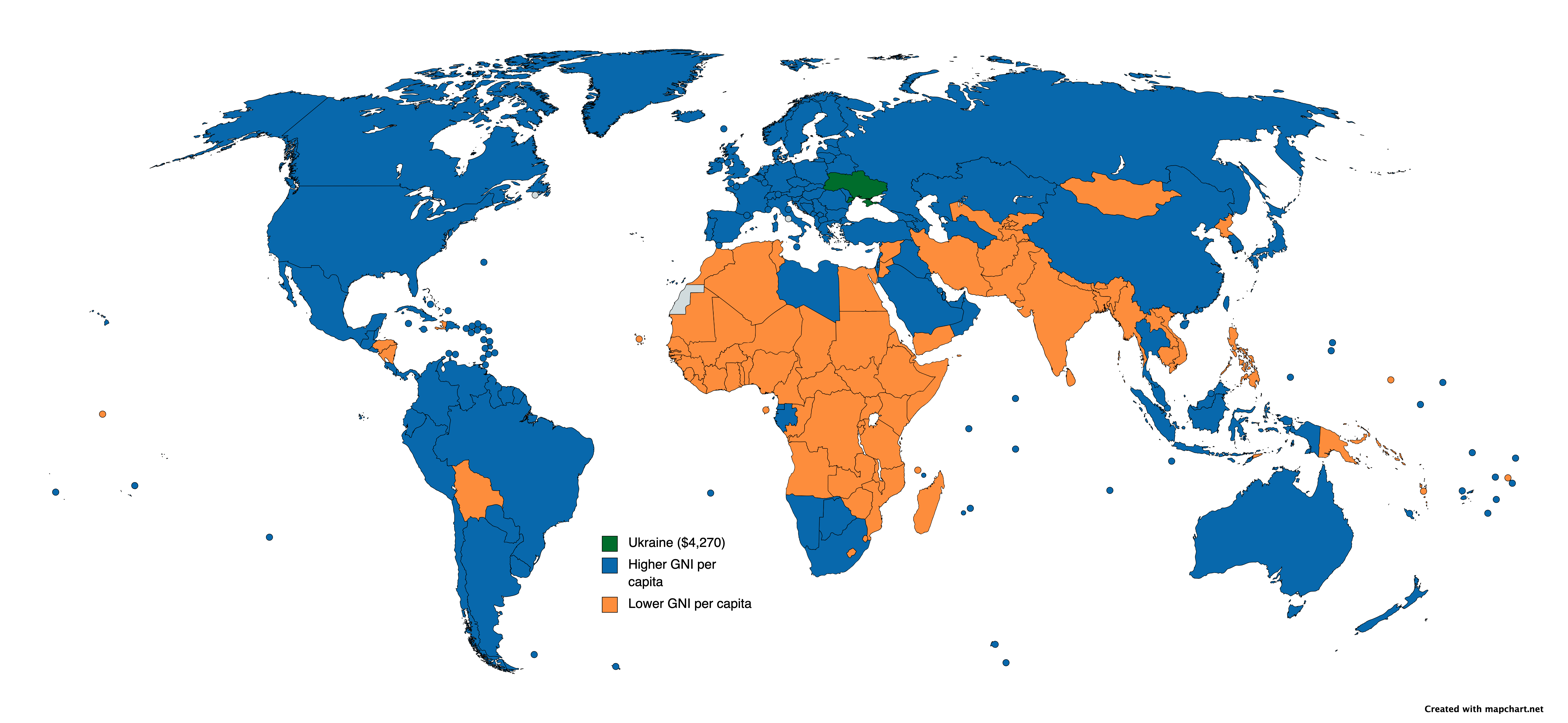
2022 GNI per capita:
Ukraine (3 000 $)
Higher GNI per capita compared to Ukraine
Lower GNI per capita compared to Ukraine

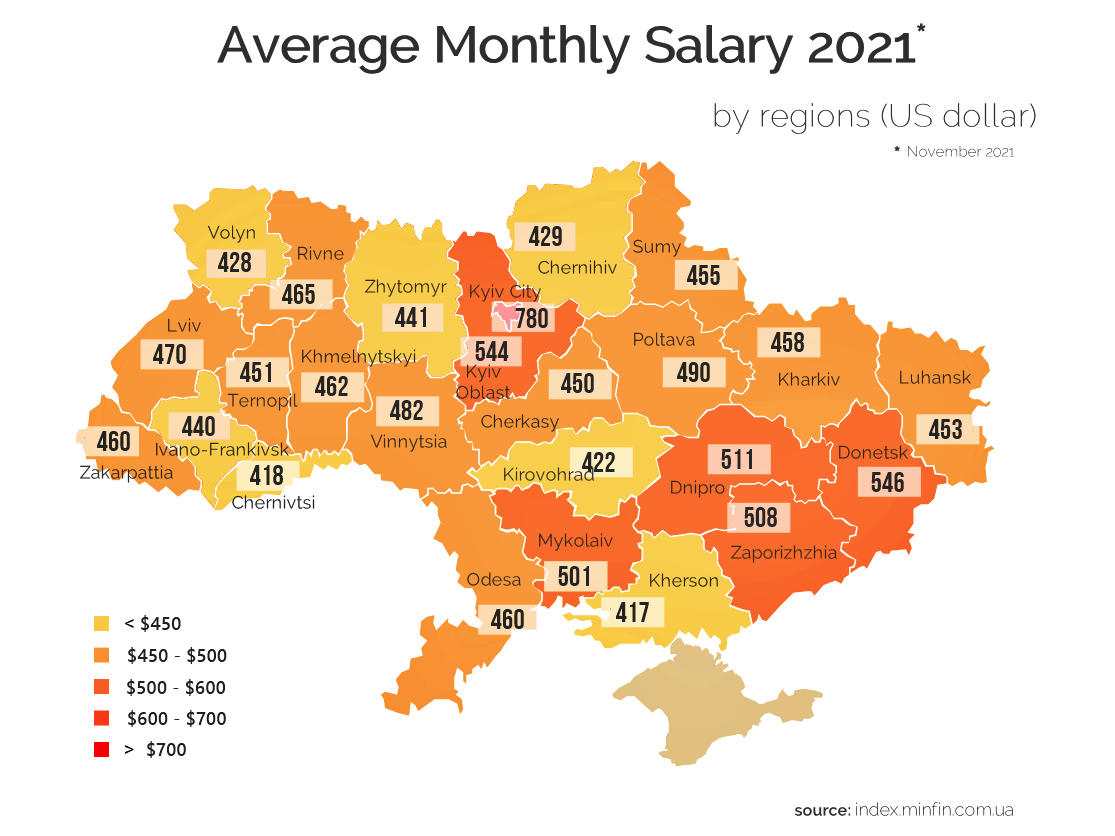
Average monthly salary in November 2021 (ranks by region)

== Sectors ==
=== Industries ===
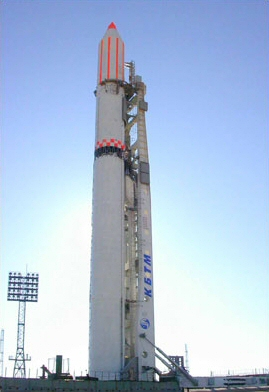
A Zenit-2, produced by the former Yuzhmash, Ukrainian rocket manufacturer

Ukraine is home to companies operating in around 20 major industries, namely power generation, fuel, ferrous and non-ferrous metallurgy, chemical and petrochemical and gas, machine building and metal-working, forest, wood-working and wood pulp and paper, construction materials, light, food, and others. Industry accounted for 26% of GDP in 2012. Ukraine has a massive high-tech industrial base, including electronics, armaments, and space programme.

==== Mining ====
Ukraine is one of the world's most important mineral producing countries, in terms of both the range and size of its reserves. There are nearly 8,000 separate deposits, harboring some 90 different minerals, of which about 20 are economically significant. About half of all the known deposits are under exploitation. Coal reserves in Ukraine amount to 47.1 billion tons. The annual domestic demand for coal as fuel is about 100 million tons, of which 85 percent can be satisfied by domestic production.

Deposits of iron ore (estimated at 28 billion tons), manganese ore (3 billion tons), chalk and limestone (1.5 billion tons) are also large in Ukraine.

In 2019, Ukraine was the 7th largest world producer of iron ore, the world's 8th largest producer of manganese, 6th largest producer of titanium, and 7th largest producer worldwide of graphite. Ukraine was the world's 9th largest producer of uranium in 2018. Before the 2022 escalation of the war with Russia Ukraine supplied about 50% of the world's neon gas and 40% of its krypton, both of which are needed for the production of semiconductors. It is estimated that over 90% of U.S. semiconductor-grade neon supplies were imported from Ukraine.

==== Iron and steel ====
Ukraine is rich in mineral deposits, including iron ore (of which it once produced 50 percent of the entire Soviet output), manganese ore (of which it produced 40 percent of world output during the Soviet era), mercury, titanium, and nickel.

Prior to the Russian-Ukrainian war, Ukraine had a major ferrous metal industry, producing cast iron, steel, and pipes. Among its economy leading companies in that field are Metinvest, Kryvorizhstal, AzovStal, Ilyich Steel & Iron Works, and others. In 2012, Ukraine was the world's tenth largest steel producer (according to the World Steel Association). In 2026, following ballistic missiles attacks, steel production had fully and indefinitely stopped across the country.

==== Chemical ====
- Chemical industry in Ukraine

An important branch of the economy of Ukraine is the country's chemical industry, which includes the production of coke, mineral fertilizers, and sulfuric acid. Production of coke dropped tremendously due to the Russo-Ukrainian War.

==== Defense ====
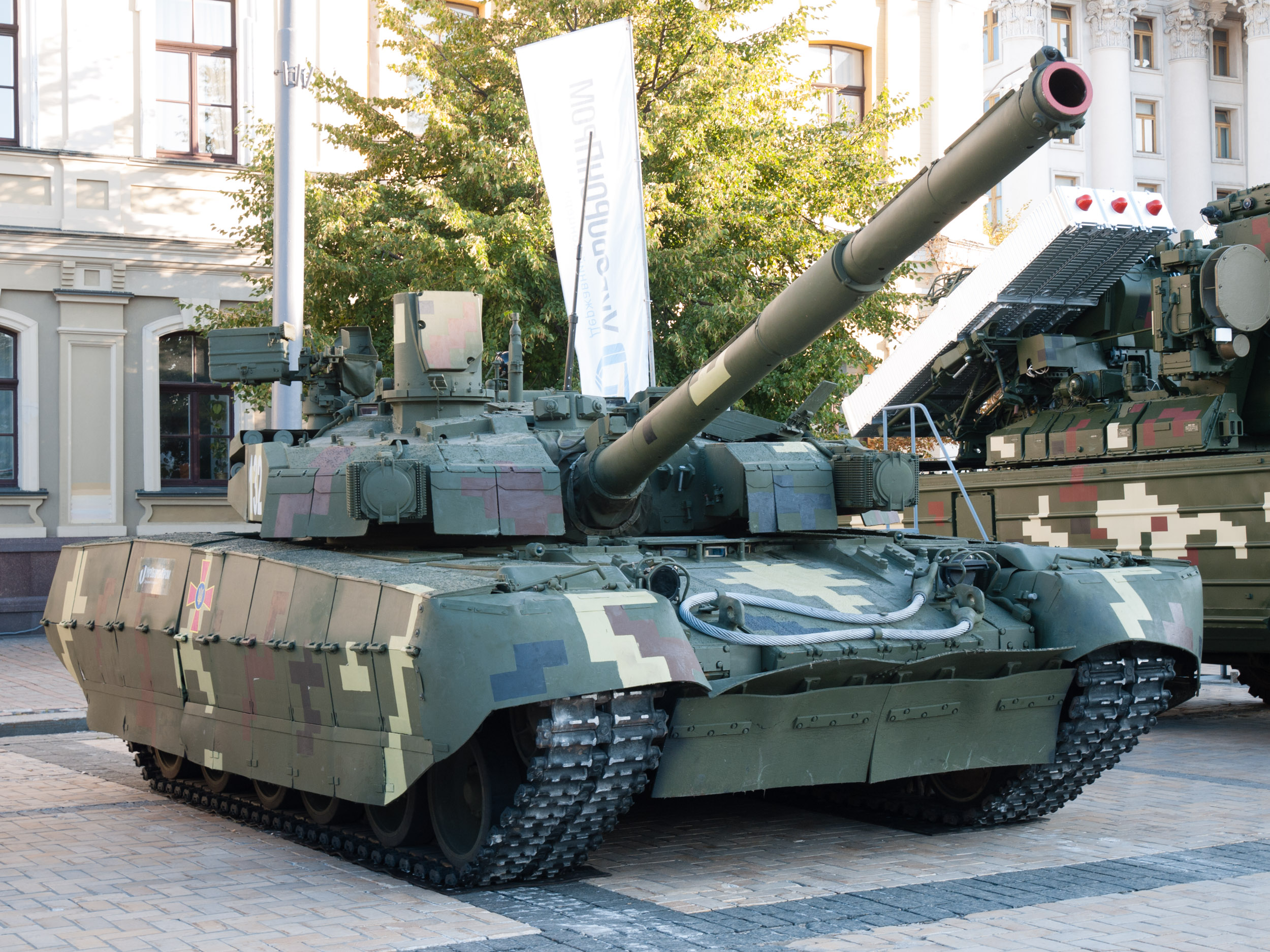
A BM Oplot, produced by KMDB

Ukraine's defense industry is organised around Ukroboronprom, a state-owned conglomerate of over 130 companies. These companies include Soviet era giants such as Ivchenko-Progress aircraft design bureau that was opened in 1945, to newer companies such as RPC Fort which came into existence in the 1990s. Ukraine is among the top 10 arms exporters in the world.

The signing of recent large contracts may put Ukraine into 6th place among biggest arms traders, after the United States, Russia, France, Germany, and Israel. The output of Ukrainian defence plants grew 58% in 2009, with largest growth reported by aircraft builders (77%) and ship builders (71%).

In 2013, Ukraine's defence sector manufactured a total of ₴11.7 billion worth of goods, ₴10 billion of which were exported. In the first 9 months of 2014, Ukraine's defence sector produced a record ₴13 billion worth of goods. The increase was largely due to government orders for the war in Donbas.

==== Energy ====
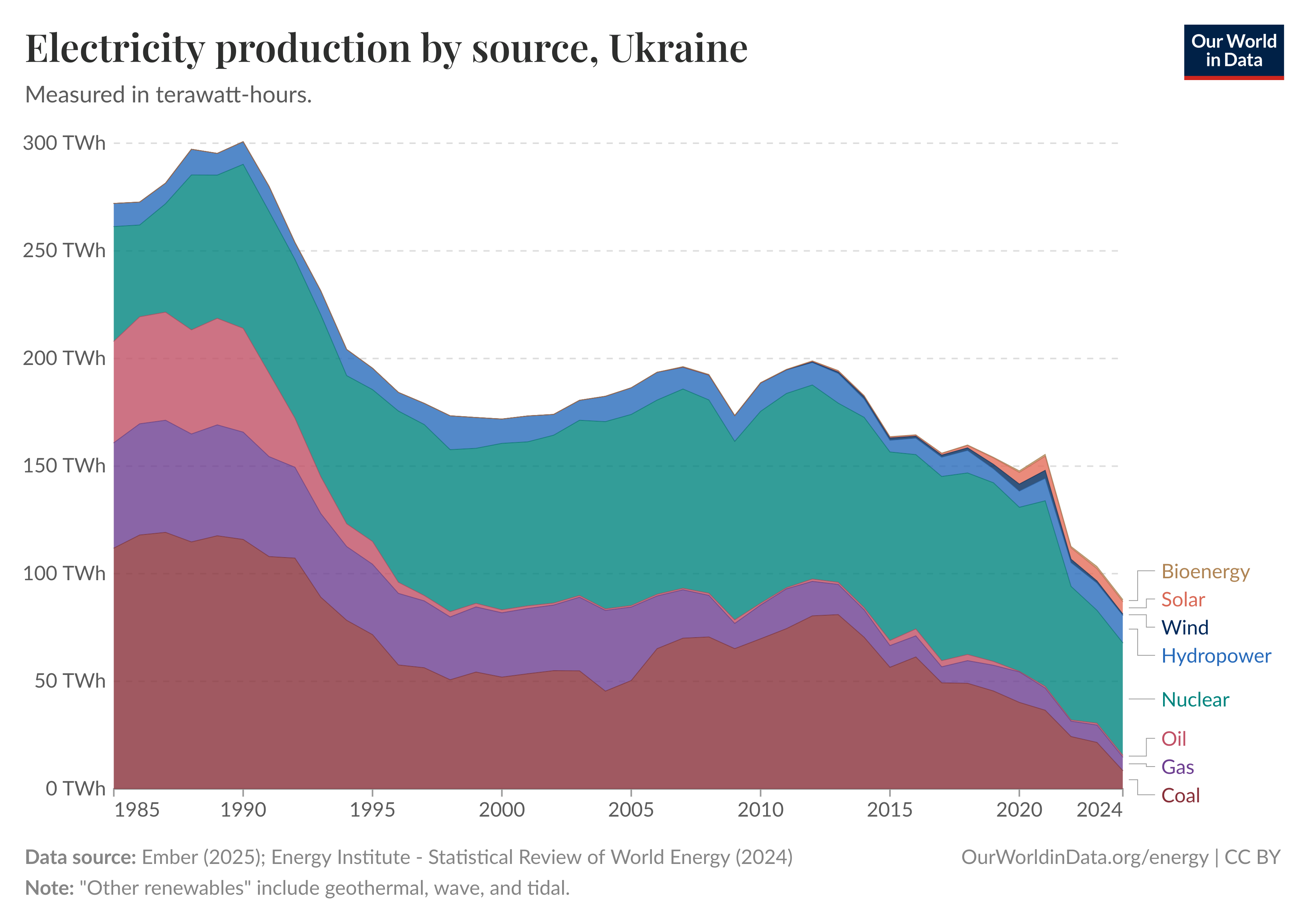
Electricity generation in Ukraine by source

Due to Ukraine's large population and its significant energy consumption, it is one of the largest energy markets on the European continent. Ukraine's location at the intersection of Europe, Russia, the Black Sea, and the Caspian Sea provides its ample natural resources such as coal, oil, natural gas, as well as significant potential for hydro and biomass energy.

Ukraine relies heavily on imports for natural gas and oil products. It is a key transit site for European imports of Russian gas. Ukraine transits more natural gas than any other country. Prior to the full-scale Russian invasion of Ukraine in 2022, economic crises, Russia's closure of its market, and the Russo-Ukrainian War in eastern Ukraine since 2014 had stymied some of the country's growth. Ukraine's energy policy has created incentives for investment in renewable energy sources, but these remain uncertain. Since 2015, Ukrainian energy policy has favoured reducing natural gas subsidies alongside diversifying energy supply. Ukraine participates in the European Union's EU4Energy Programme, an effort to promote evidence-based policy making in national energy sectors.

===== Oil and gas =====
Ukraine has oil and gas fields that meet 10 percent of its oil and 20 percent of its gas consumption, respectively. Ukraine contains natural gas reserves of 39.6 billion cubic feet (1.12 billion cubic metres), but only about 20 percent of Ukraine's demand is met by domestic production.Ukraine increased oil and gas production in 2023 up to 18.7 bcm.

Ukraine remains heavily reliant on oil product and gas imports. Russia ranks as Ukraine's principal supplier of oil, and Russian firms own and/or operate the majority of Ukraine's refining capacity. Natural gas imports come from Russia – which delivers its own gas, as well as the gas from Turkmenistan.

Ukraine has been a key transit point for EU imports of Russian gas, and its pipeline system has been a crucial player in European energy supply, despite recent diversification of transit routes by Russian oil companies such as Gazprom. Since the 2014 Russia–Ukraine gas disputes, the latter's dependence on Russian gas supplies has dramatically affected its economics and foreign policy.

Ukraine was independent in its electricity supply, and exported electricity to Russia and other countries of Eastern Europe. This was achieved through a wide use of nuclear power and hydroelectricity. Its energy strategy intended a gradual decreasing of gas- and oil-based generation in favour of nuclear power, as well as energy saving measures including lower industrial gas consumption. Reform of the still inefficient and opaque energy sector was a major objective of the International Monetary Fund (IMF) and World Bank programs with Ukraine.

Ukraine was a partner country of the European Union's INOGATE energy programme, which had four key topics: enhancing energy security, convergence of member state energy markets on the basis of EU internal energy market principles, supporting sustainable energy development, and attracting investment for energy projects of common and regional interest. INOGATE was discontinued in 2016.

Russia's full-scale invasion severely affected Ukraine's fuel retail sector. Repeated attacks on oil depots, refineries and retail filling stations disrupted fuel distribution, causing nationwide shortages during 2022 and continued damage to fuel infrastructure in frontline regions. Despite these attacks, Ukrainian fuel retailers gradually restored supply chains through increased imports from the European Union and the expansion of domestic logistics networks.

As a result of the Russian shelling of the UPG gas station network since the beginning of the full-scale invasion, approximately eight gas stations have been damaged, said Volodymyr Moroz, executive director of the network operator, PE Ukrpaletsystem, during a meeting of the Temporary Investigative Commission of the Verkhovna Rada chaired by People's Deputy of Ukraine Oleksiy Honcharenko. As a result of this damage, this and other networks are suffering large losses. All this to some extent affects the price of fuel. At the end of 2025, UPG became one of the three largest fuel retail chains in Ukraine after expanding its network to over 500 gas stations thanks to the lease of former ANP and Avias assets, approved by the Antimonopoly Committee of Ukraine.

At the end of June, WOG CEO and former Minister of Infrastructure Andriy Pyvovarsky noted that over the past two months, more than 150 gas stations have burned down in Ukraine. He added that oil depots and other fuel infrastructure facilities are attacked almost weekly

==== Automotive ====
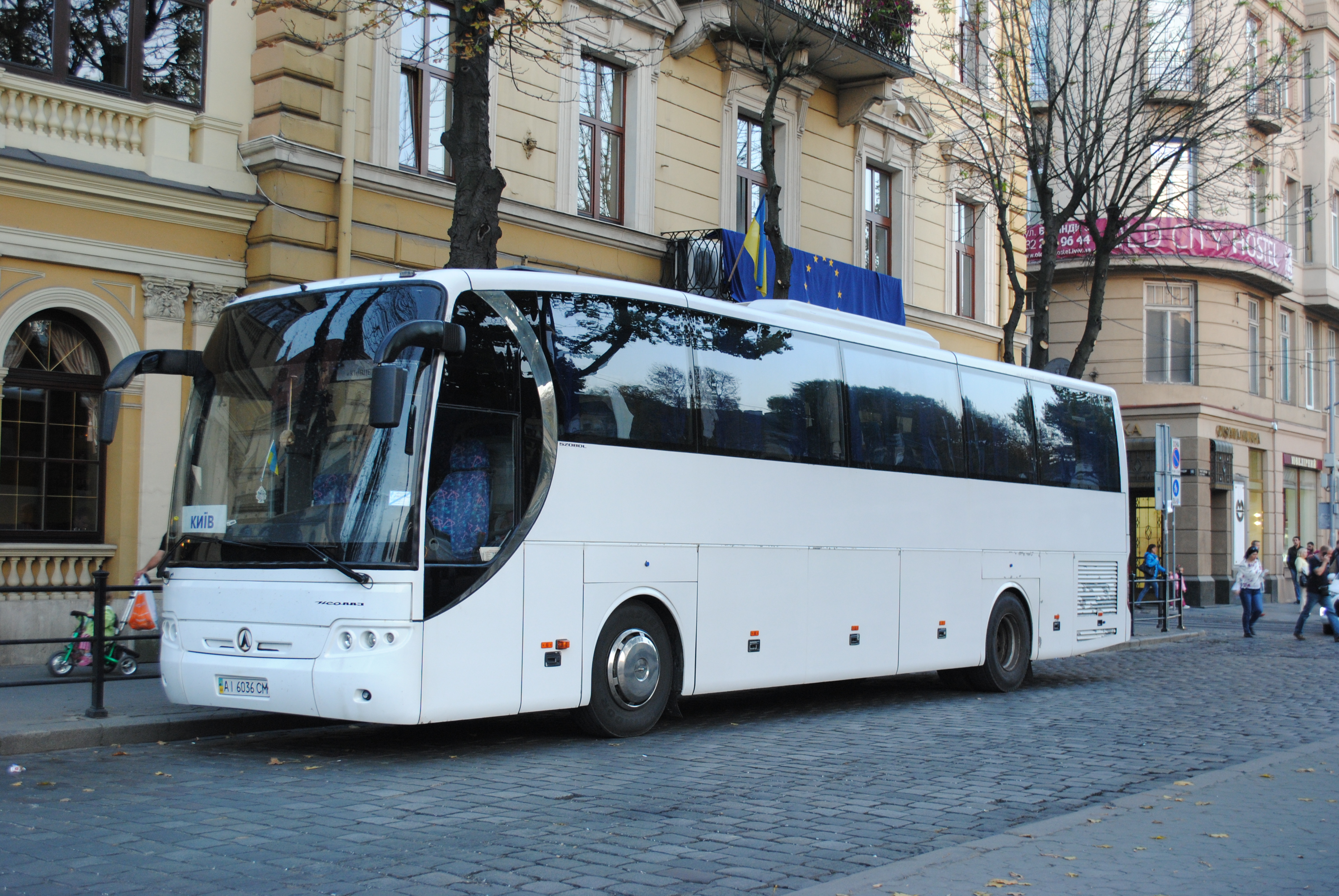
A LAZ-5208DL built by Lviv Bus Factory

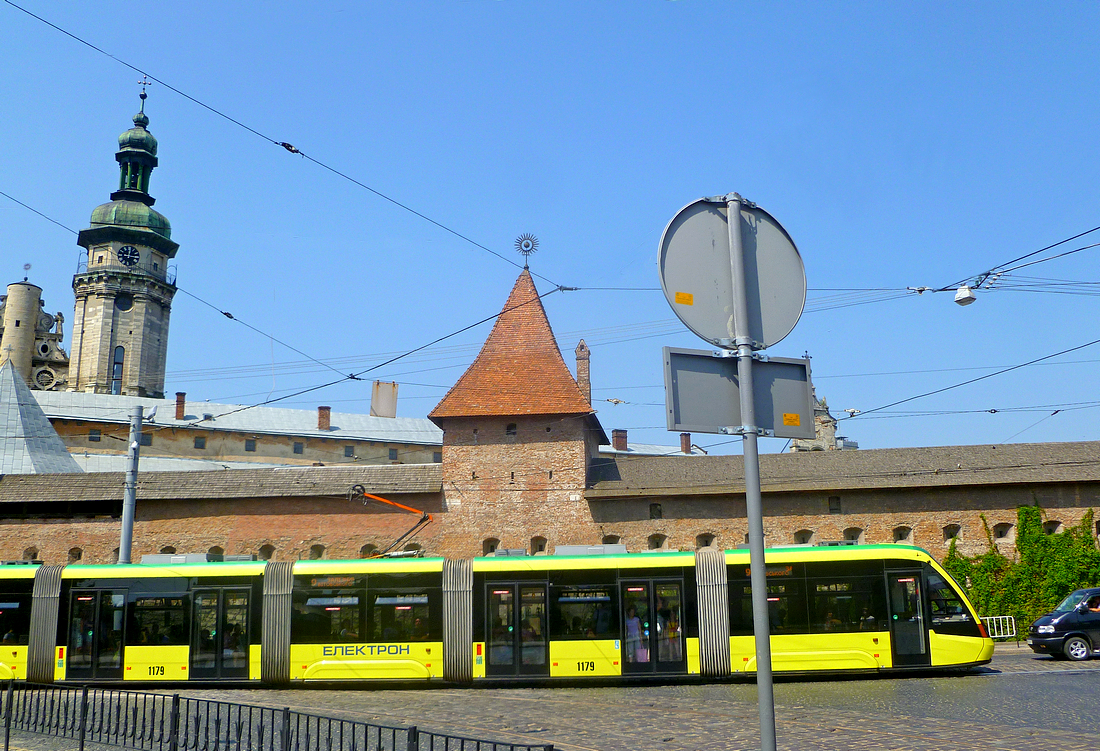
A modern Electron T5L64 tram

Ukraine automobile manufacturers produce diesel locomotives, tractors, trucks, buses, trolleybuses, own-designed cars and trams. There are 12 automobile manufacturers in Ukraine, including ZAZ, LuAZ, Bogdan, KrAZ, Eurocar, Electron, and LAZ.

ZAZ (Zaporizhzhia Automobile Building Plant) is the main automobile-manufacturer of Ukraine, based in the south-eastern city of Zaporizhzhia. Passenger car manufacturing in Ukraine started in 1959. From 1960 to 1994, a total of 3,422,444 Zaporozhets vehicles were manufactured in Zaporizhzhia and engines with air-cooling in Melitopol. In 2011–2012, the Zaporizhzhia Automobile Building Plant started serial full-scale production of two new models of vehicle, the ZAZ Forza (a re-badged Chinese Chery A13) and the ZAZ Vida (a re-badged Daewoo Aveo).

The Bogdan Corporation is a leading Ukrainian automobile-manufacturing group, including several car- and bus-makers of Ukraine. Bogdan buses (re-badged Isuzu models) are used as the primary small buses in most Ukrainian cities.

LAZ used to be one of the major bus manufacturers in Ukraine. It manufactured city buses, coach buses, trolley buses, and special purpose buses. The company has been defunct since 2014.

The Lviv-based company Electrontrans is an enterprise of a full-scale production, specialising in design and production of modern urban electric transport – trams, trolleybuses, electric buses, units, and spare parts. In 2013 Electrontrans started producing low-floor trams, the first Ukrainian 100% low-floor tramways.

==== Aircraft and aerospace ====
- Aviation industry of Ukraine

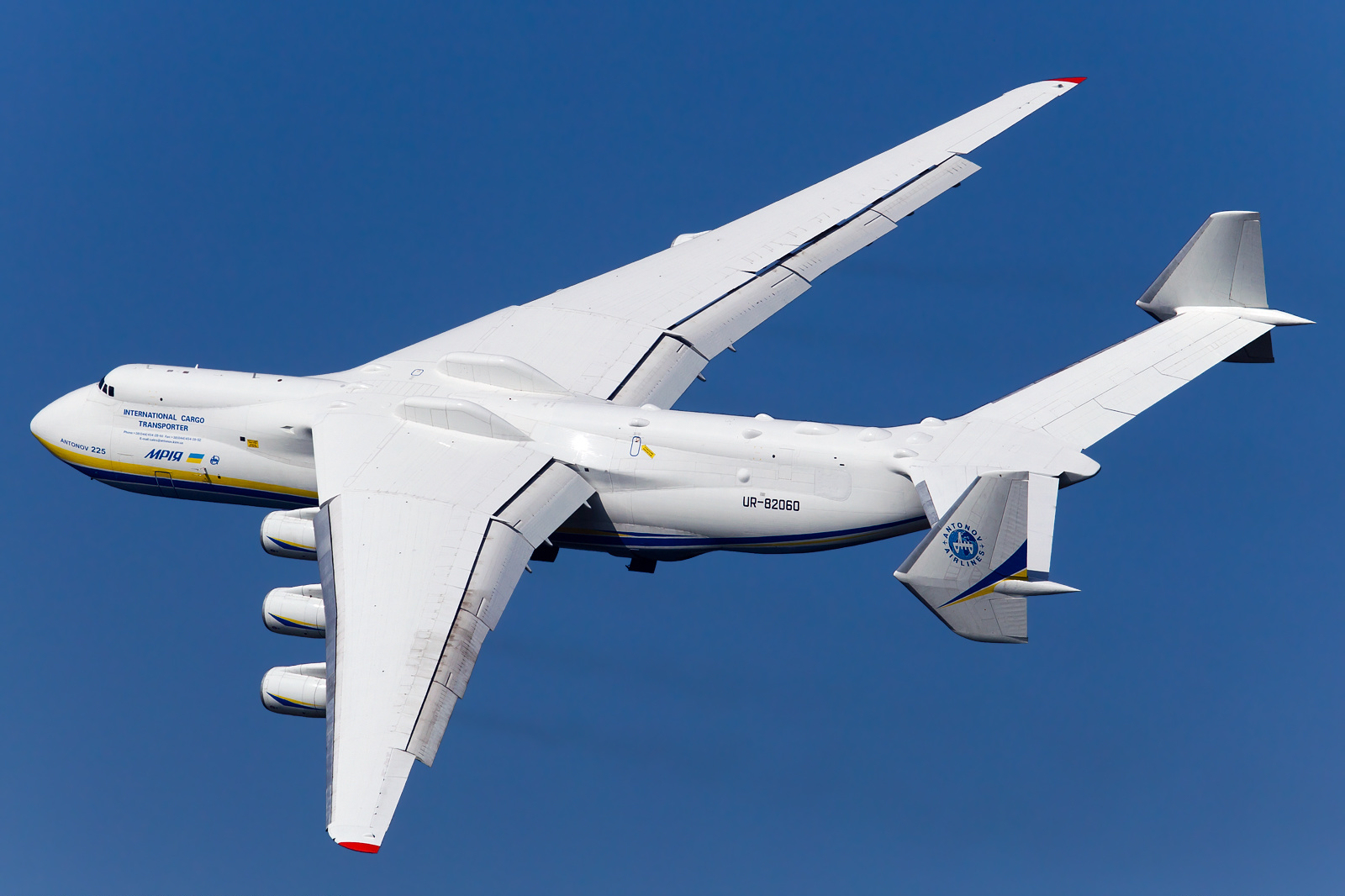
The Antonov An-225 Mriya was the largest aircraft in the world prior to its destruction in 2022.

Ukraine is one of nine countries with a full cycle of aerospace hardware engineering and production. Besides the design and production of passenger and transportation aircraft, Ukraine has a network of aircraft repair enterprises, including companies involved in the recovery of military planes and helicopters. In March 2007, the Cabinet of Ministers of Ukraine created the state aircraft building concern Aviation of Ukraine (SACAU), which is governed by the Ministry of Industrial Policy. Production of An-148 aircraft is now one of the most prospective projects for the Ukrainian plane manufacturing industry with 35 units manufactured since 2009 (together with Russian production).

The aircraft were engineered by the Antonov Scientific and Production Complex Design Office (Antonov ANTK). The largest single airplane in the world, Antonov An-225 Mriya was designed by Antonov ANTK and made in 1988. The gross production of light and ultra light planes in Ukraine does not exceed 200 units per annum. Production of hang-gliders and paragliders of all designs makes nearly 1,000 units each year. Most of produced devices are exported. The main buyers of Ukrainian-made ultra-light aircraft are the United States, Australia, New Zealand, the United Kingdom, France, etc..

Since 2014, aerospace industry revenues have fallen by 80%. In June 2016, the Antonov Corporation merged with the state-owned military conglomerate Ukroboronprom, forming Ukrainian Aircraft Corporation within its structure. This merger was done to boost Antonov profits and the production rate. In 2018, Antonov was working on two cargo planes: the An-178, a cargo version of the An-158, and the An-132D, a redesigned version of the An-32. The An-132 was developed jointly with Saudi's Taqnia Aeronautics Company, featuring western avionics and engines. The roll out and first flight was due at the beginning of January 2017.

The space rocket industry in Ukraine has been managed by the State Space Agency of Ukraine since 1992. The agency included 30 enterprises, scientific research institutes, and design offices. Pivdenne Design Bureau was in general responsible for creating the Zenit-3SL carrier rocket. In 2013, The National Space Agency of Ukraine was involved in cooperation with American Rockwell Int., as well as the Sea Launch project. Yuzhnoye SDO was the designer and manufacturer of the initial first stage core of the U.S. Orbital ATK Antares rocket.

==== Shipbuilding ====
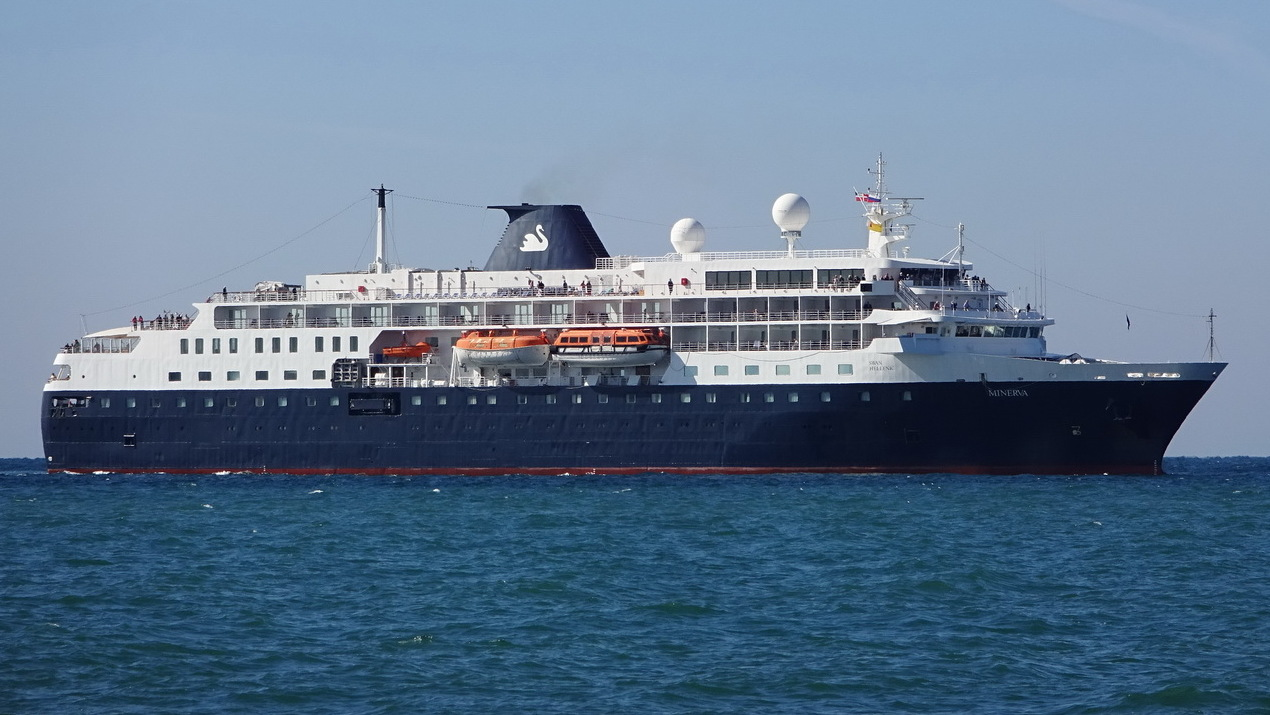
MV Minerva − a passenger ship built in Ukraine

Ukraine is one of the 10 largest shipbuilding countries in Europe. There are 49 shipbuilding companies registered in Ukraine. They are able to build a wide range of vessel types: powerboats, barges, bulk carriers (dry cargo ship), tankers, liquefied gas carriers, etc.

The USSR's collapse put Ukraine's shipbuilding industry into a long-term decline. This lasted until 1999 and was mostly due to a minimum volume of state shipbuilding orders. Between 1992 and 2003, Ukraine's 11 shipyards produced 237 navigation units for a total value of US$1.5 billion. Production facilities are not working near full capacity, and customers are not always timely in paying for services. The shipbuilding industry grew between 2000 and 2006, in line with the wider Ukrainian economic expansion at the time.

State support and the opening of free economic zones, foremost at enterprises based in Mykolaiv, were a recent development in Ukraine's shipbuilding industry. Within the Mykolaiv Special Economic Zone, enterprises like Damen Shipyards Okean, Chornomorskyi (Black Sea) Shipbuilding Plant (defunct since 2021), 61 Communards Shipbuilding Plant, as well as the Veselka (Rainbow) paint and insulation enterprise are implementing investment projects targeted to raise efficiency and quality in primarily export-oriented vessels through production upgrades. The new engineering developments and potential of Ukrainian designers provide the ability to build high quality vessels with competitive prices.

About 100,000 Ukrainians regularly work on foreign merchant ships, one of the largest group of Ukrainian labour migrants and the sixth largest number of sailors from any country. They are attracted by the high salaries of more than US$1,000 per month.

Every major Ukrainian coastal city has a maritime university.

=== Agriculture, livestock, fishing and forestry ===
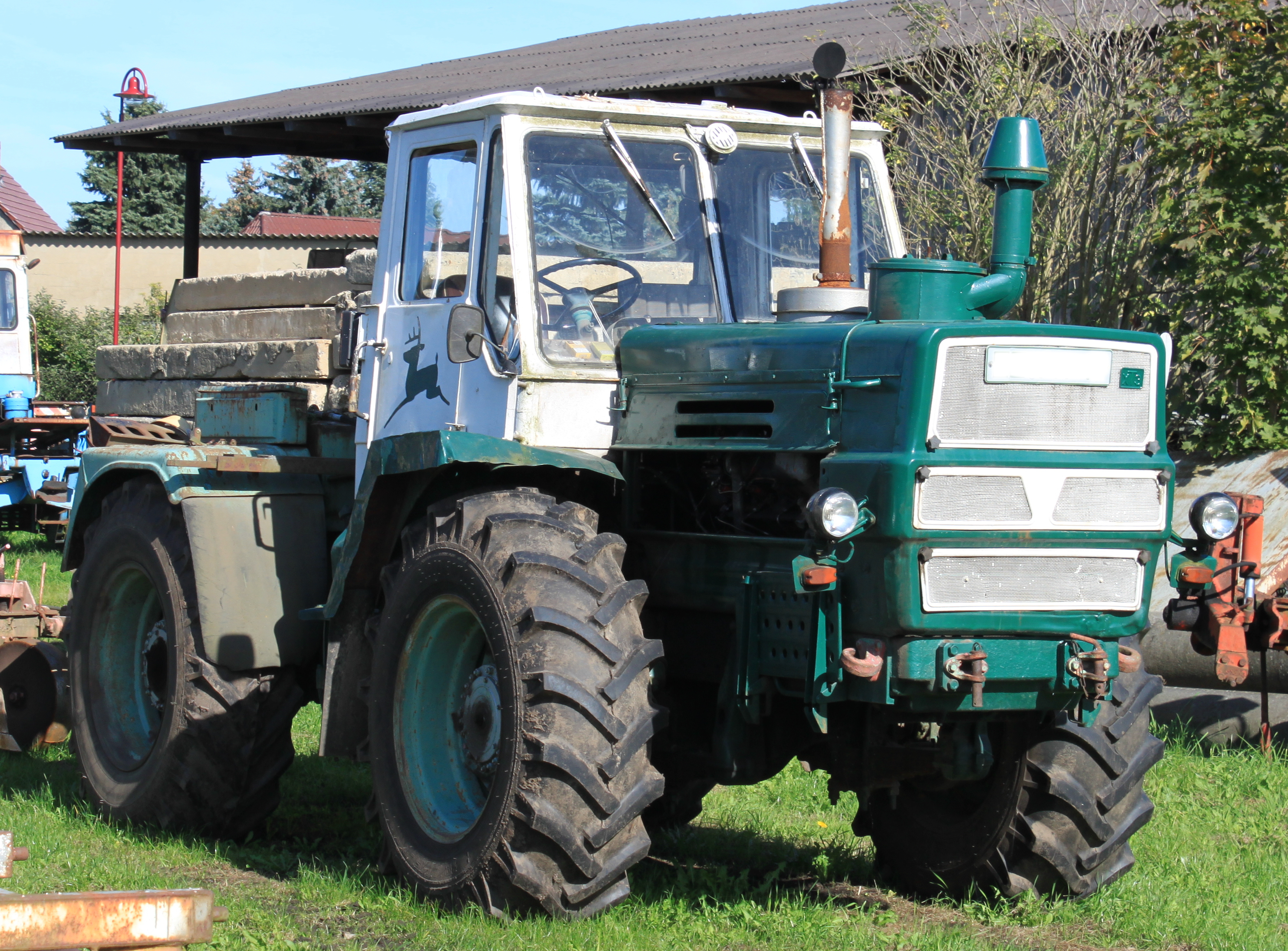
A Ukrainian T-150K tractor built by the Kharkiv Tractor Plant

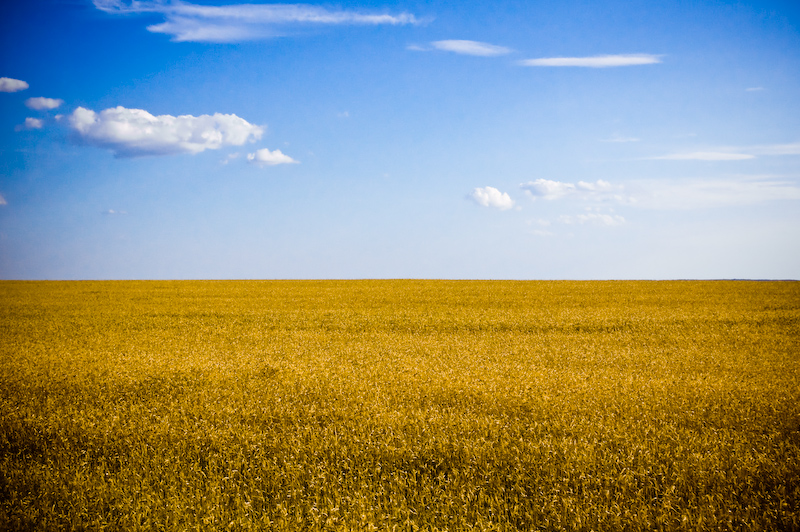
Ukraine's flag resembles the nation's farmlands.

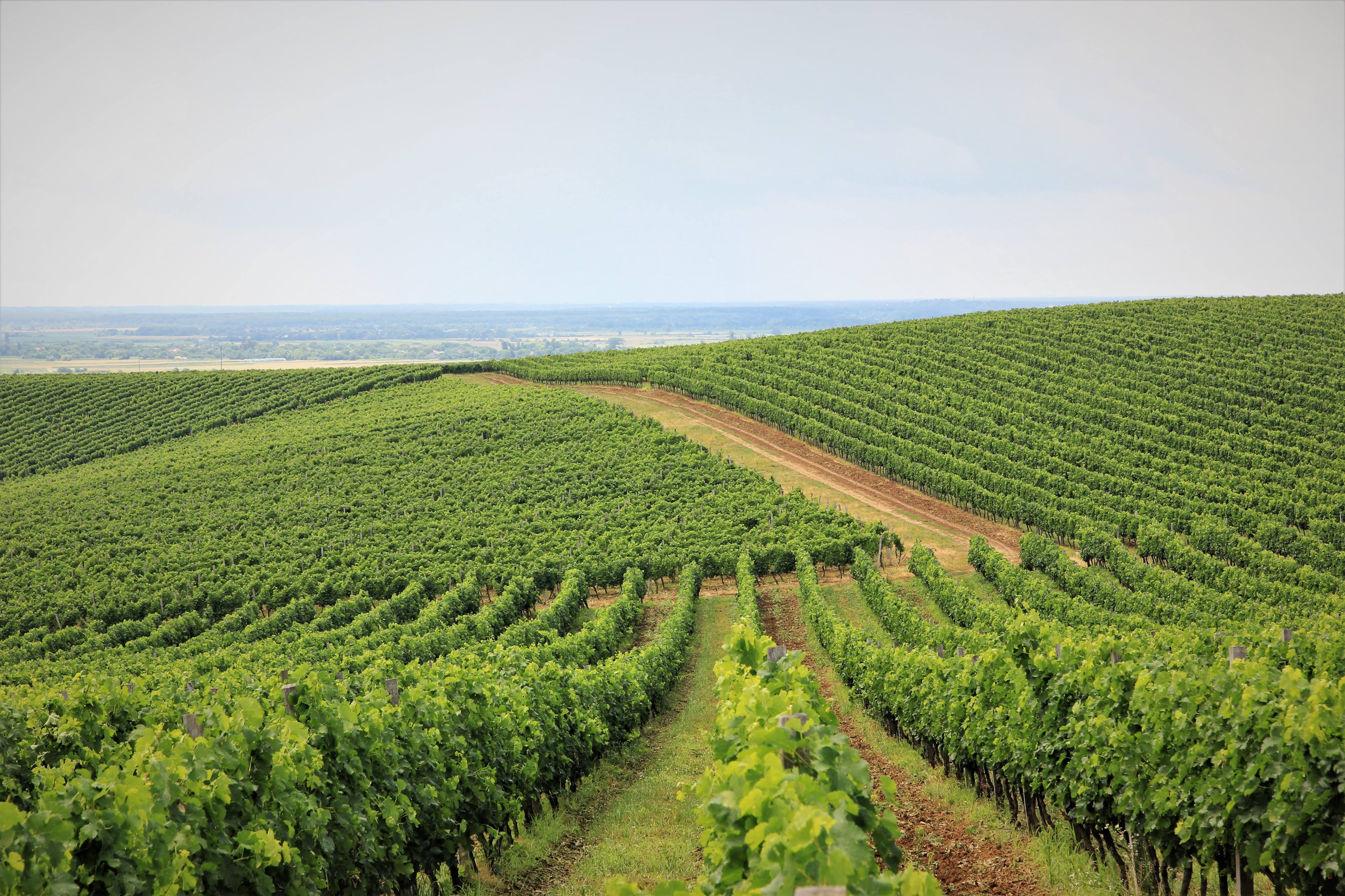
Vineyards in Zakarpattia Oblast

Although typically known as the industrial base of the Soviet Union, agriculture is a large part of Ukraine's economy. Ukraine is one of the world's largest agricultural producers and exporters and is known as the "breadbasket" of Europe.

In 2008, agriculture accounted for 8.29% of Ukraine's GDP and by 2012 had grown to 10.43% of the GDP. Agriculture accounted for $13.98 billion of value added to the economy of Ukraine in 2012. Despite being a top 10 world producer of several crops such as wheat and corn, Ukraine still only ranks 24 out of 112 nations measured in terms of overall agricultural production.

In 2011, Ukraine was the world's largest producer of sunflower oil, a major global producer of grain and sugar, and a potential global player on meat and dairy markets. It was one of the largest producers of nuts. Ukraine produced more natural honey than any other European country and was one of the world's largest honey producers. An estimated 1.5% of its population was involved in honey production, therefore Ukraine had the highest honey per capita production rate in the world. Because Ukraine possesses 30% of the world's richest black soil, makes its agricultural industry have huge potential.

At the beginning of the 21st century, Ukraine's agricultural industry was highly profitable, generating profit margins of 40–60%. Analysts indicated that the sector had the potential to increase its output by up to four times. Ukraine was the world's 6th largest, 5th if not including the EU as a separate state, producer of corn in the world and the 3rd largest corn exporter in the world. In 2012, Ukraine signed a contract with China, the world's largest importer of corn, to supply China with 3 million tonnes of corn annually at market price. The deal included a $3 billion line of credit extension from China to Ukraine.

In 2014, Ukraine's total grain crop was estimated to be a record 64 million metric tons. In 2014, Ukraine lost control over portions of several regions to Russia, followed by the start of the war in Donbas and the annexation of Crimea by the Russian Federation, (Note: Crimea is currently under dispute by Russia and Ukraine.) hence the actual available crop yield was closer to 60.5 million metric tons. Due to the decline of the metallurgy industry, which was previously Ukraine's top export category, agricultural products have become Ukraine's largest export category as a result of the war in Donbas.

Since at least 2011, farmland was remaining as the only major asset in Ukraine that was not privatised. In March 2020, the Ukrainian parliament lifted a ban on the sale of farmland. The land market was fully opened for the first time since independence on 1 July 2021.

Agricultural output of Ukraine since 1961, in 2015 US$

Ukraine also produces some wine, mostly in the South-Western regions.

In 2018:

- It was the 5th largest world producer of maize (35.8 million metric tons (35,200,000 long tons; 39,500,000 short tons)), after the U.S., China, Brazil, and Argentina;
- It was the 8th largest world producer of wheat (24.6 million metric tons (24,200,000 long tons; 27,100,000 short tons));
- It was the 3rd largest world producer of potatoes (22.5 million metric tons (22,100,000 long tons; 24,800,000 short tons)), second only to China and India;
- It was the world's largest producer of sunflower seed (14.1 million metric tons (13,900,000 long tons; 15,500,000 short tons));
- It was the 7th largest world producer of sugar beets (13.9 million metric tons (13,700,000 long tons; 15,300,000 short tons)), which is used to produce sugar and ethanol;
- It was the 7th largest world producer of barley (7.3 million metric tons (7,200,000 long tons; 8,000,000 short tons));
- It was the 7th largest world producer of rapeseed (2.7 million metric tons (2,700,000 long tons; 3,000,000 short tons));
- It was the 13th largest world producer of tomatoes (2.3 million metric tons (2,300,000 long tons; 2,500,000 short tons));
- It was the 5th largest world producer of cabbage (1.6 million metric tons (1,600,000 long tons; 1,800,000 short tons)), after China, India, South Korea, and Russia;
- It was the 11th largest world producer of apples (1.4 million metric tons (1,400,000 long tons; 1,500,000 short tons));
- It was the 3rd largest world producer of pumpkins (1.3 million metric tons (1,300,000 long tons; 1,400,000 short tons)), second only to China and India;
- It was the 6th largest world producer of cucumbers (985 thousand metric tons (969,000 long tons; 1,086,000 short tons));
- It was the 5th largest world producer of carrots (841 thousand metric tons (828,000 long tons; 927,000 short tons)), after China, Uzbekistan, the U.S., and Russia;
- It was the 4th largest world producer of dry peas (775 thousand metric tons (763,000 long tons; 854,000 short tons)), second only to Canada, Russia, and China;
- It was the 7th largest world producer of rye (393 thousand metric tons (387,000 long tons; 433,000 short tons));
- It was the 3rd largest world producer of buckwheat (137 thousand metric tons (135,000 long tons; 151,000 short tons)), second only to China and Russia;
- It was the 6th largest world producer of walnuts (127 thousand metric tons (125,000 long tons; 140,000 short tons));
- It produced 4.4 million metric tons (4,300,000 long tons; 4,900,000 short tons) of soy;
- It produced 883 thousand metric tons (869,000 long tons; 973,000 short tons) of onions;
- It produced 467 thousand metric tons (460,000 long tons; 515,000 short tons) of grapes;
- It produced 418 thousand metric tons (411,000 long tons; 461,000 short tons) of oats;
- It produced 396 thousand metric tons (390,000 long tons; 437,000 short tons) of watermelons;
- It produced 300 thousand metric tons (300,000 long tons; 330,000 short tons) of cherries;

in addition to smaller productions of other agricultural products.

Professionalised, scientific breeding of barley began in 1910 and now supplies improved cultivars to the country.

Ukraine's fishing industry comprises marine fisheries, inland freshwater fishing and freshwater aquaculture, overseen by the State Agency of Fisheries of Ukraine. Operations historically focus on the Black Sea, the Sea of Azov and domestic river and lake systems.

The majority of Ukraine's woodlands are managed by the State Forest Resources Agency. Although efforts to improve the country's growing stock were hampered by contamination from the Chernobyl accident of 1986, Ukraine's economically productive forested areas expanded dramatically in the years following independence and in the early 21st century.

=== Information technology ===
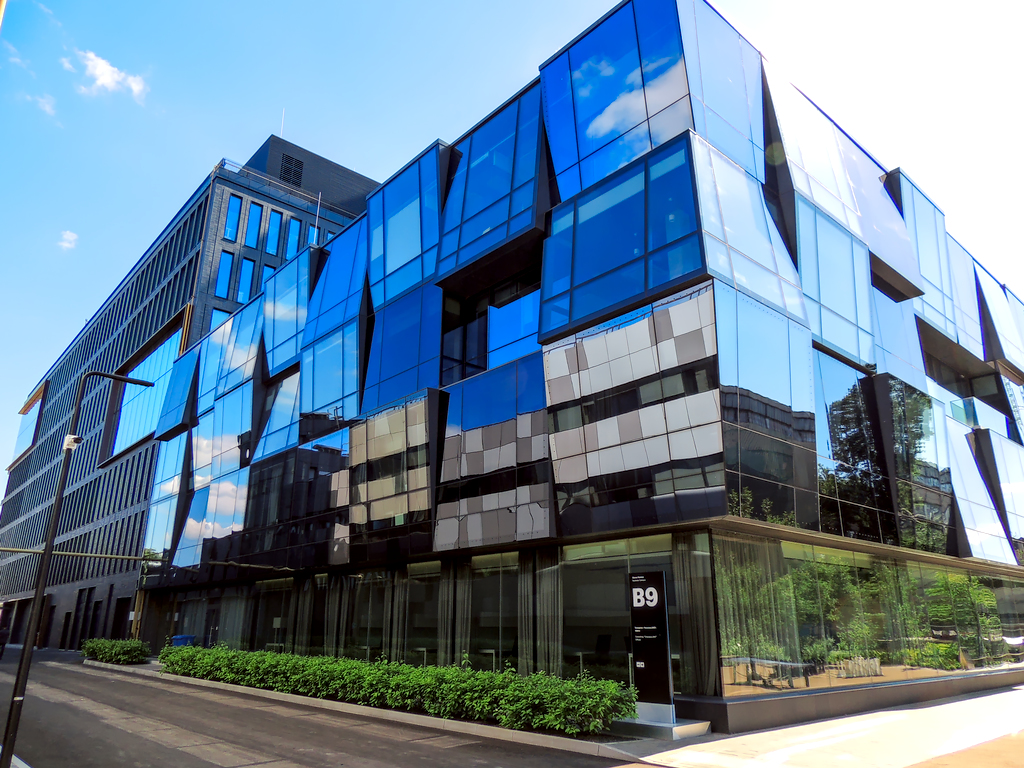
Ukrainian National IT Factory in Kyiv

Ukraine has a long-standing reputation as a major technology region, with a well-developed scientific and educational base. In March 2013, Ukraine ranked 4th in the world in number of certified IT professionals after the United States, India, and Russia. On top of that, experts recognised both the quantitative and qualitative potential of Ukrainian specialists. In 2011, the number of IT specialists working in the industry reached 25,000 people with 20% growth. The volume of the Ukrainian IT market in 2013 was estimated to be up to 3.6 billion U.S. dollars.

In 2017, Ukraine emerged as the top outsourcing destination of the year, according to the Global Sourcing Association. By 2017, there were 13 research and development centres of global companies located in Ukraine, including Ericsson Ukraine, in Lviv.

As for 2019, the number of IT specialists involved in the IT industry of Ukraine reached 172,000 people. The share of IT industry in Ukraine's GDP is 4%.

According to the IT sector report of 2019, Ukraine is the largest exporter of IT services in Europe, and ranks among the 25 most attractive countries for software development worldwide.

=== Services ===
==== Finance and banking ====
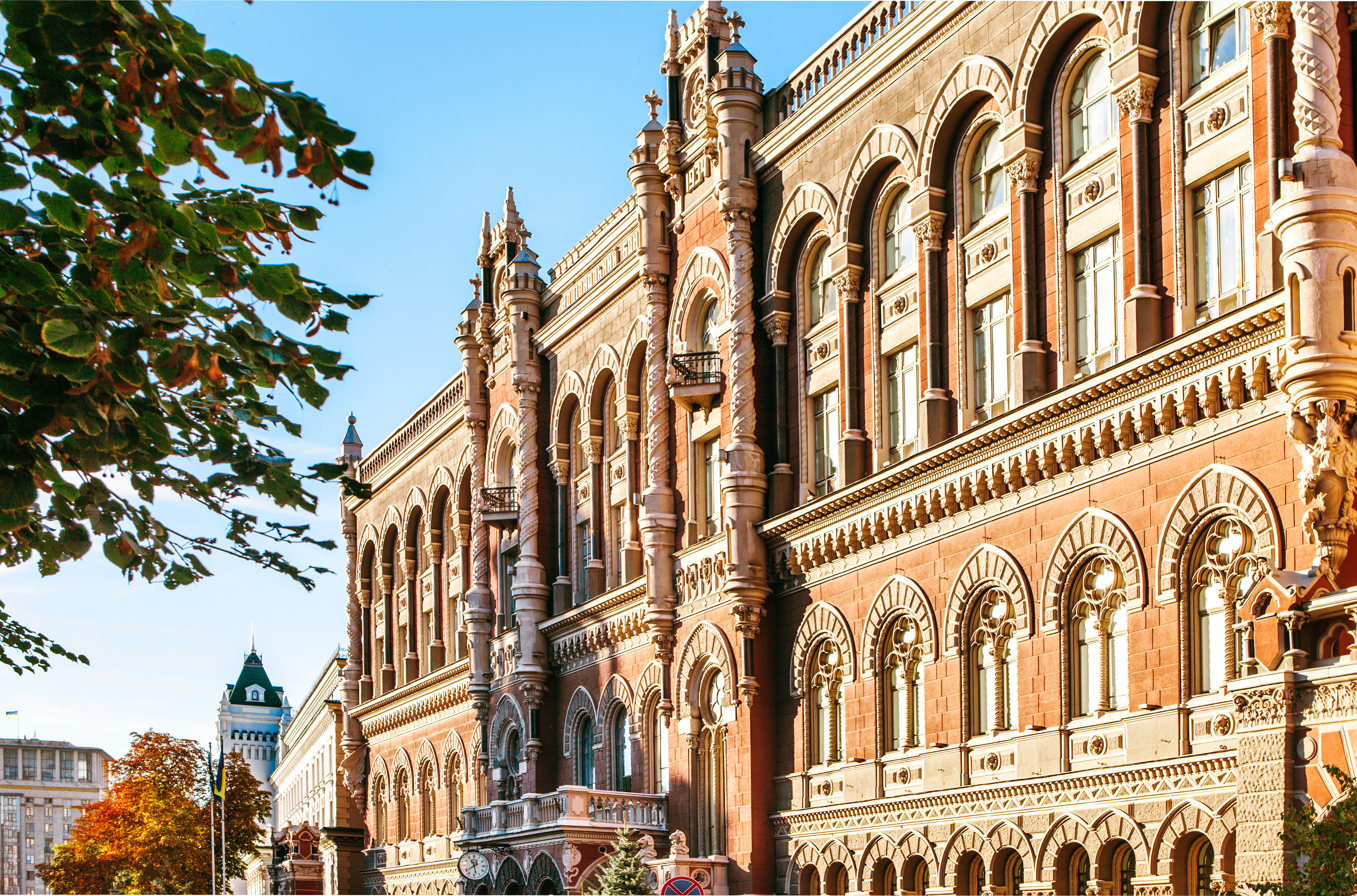
The National Bank of Ukraine

The history of banking in Ukraine since Ukrainian independence in 1991 has seen since the late 2000s several periods of bank mergers and acquisitions of different natures. Early 2016 117 banks were operating in Ukraine, their assets amounted to ₴1.254 trillion. According to the central bank of Ukraine there were 81 solvent licensed banks in Ukraine on 1 October 2018 whose assets were ₴1.355 trillion ($48 billion).

===== International financial institutions =====
In 1992, Ukraine became a member of the IMF and the World Bank. It is also a member of the European Bank for Reconstruction and Development.

On 26 February 2026, the International Monetary Fund approved a new 48-month Extended Fund Facility arrangement for Ukraine worth approximately US$8.1 billion, replacing the programme approved in 2023. The decision authorized an immediate disbursement of approximately US$1.5 billion. The IMF estimated Ukraine's financing gap for 2026 at US$52 billion. The arrangement formed part of a wider international support package estimated at US$136.5 billion over the four-year programme period.

According to the World Bank, as of 31 October 2026, approximately US$101 billion in financial support had been mobilized for Ukraine through World Bank Group initiatives and associated donor and partner financing since February 2022. Of this amount, US$80.3 billion had been disbursed. The financing comprised multiple instruments, including loans, grants, guarantees and private-sector support, and should not be interpreted as an equivalent increase in Ukraine's sovereign external debt.

In 2008, the country joined the World Trade Organization (WTO). Ukraine applied for WTO membership in 1993, but its accession process was stalled for 15 years.

==== Education ====
Starting in September 2018, children who start school have 12 years of education, while those already in school complete their studying by 11-year system. As a rule, schooling begins at the age of 6, unless your birthday is on or after 1 September. In 2016/17, the number of students in primary and secondary school reached 3,846,000, in vocational school 285,800, and in higher education 1,586,700 students. According to 2017 EduConf speech of the (then) Minister of Education and Science of Ukraine, Liliya Hrynevych, the amount of budget financing for the sphere of education would reach about ₴53 billion in 2017 (compared to 42 in 2016).

The NGO Human Rights Measurement Initiative in the spring of 2022 concluded that Ukraine is fulfilling 84.2% of what they should be fulfilling on the right to education, based on their level of income.

==== Healthcare ====
National Health Service of Ukraine

Healthcare in Ukraine is part of a universal health care system largely built up as a successor of the Soviet healthcare system otherwise dismantled in 1991. The Ministry of Healthcare implements the state policy in the country in the field of medicine and healthcare.

==== Tourism ====
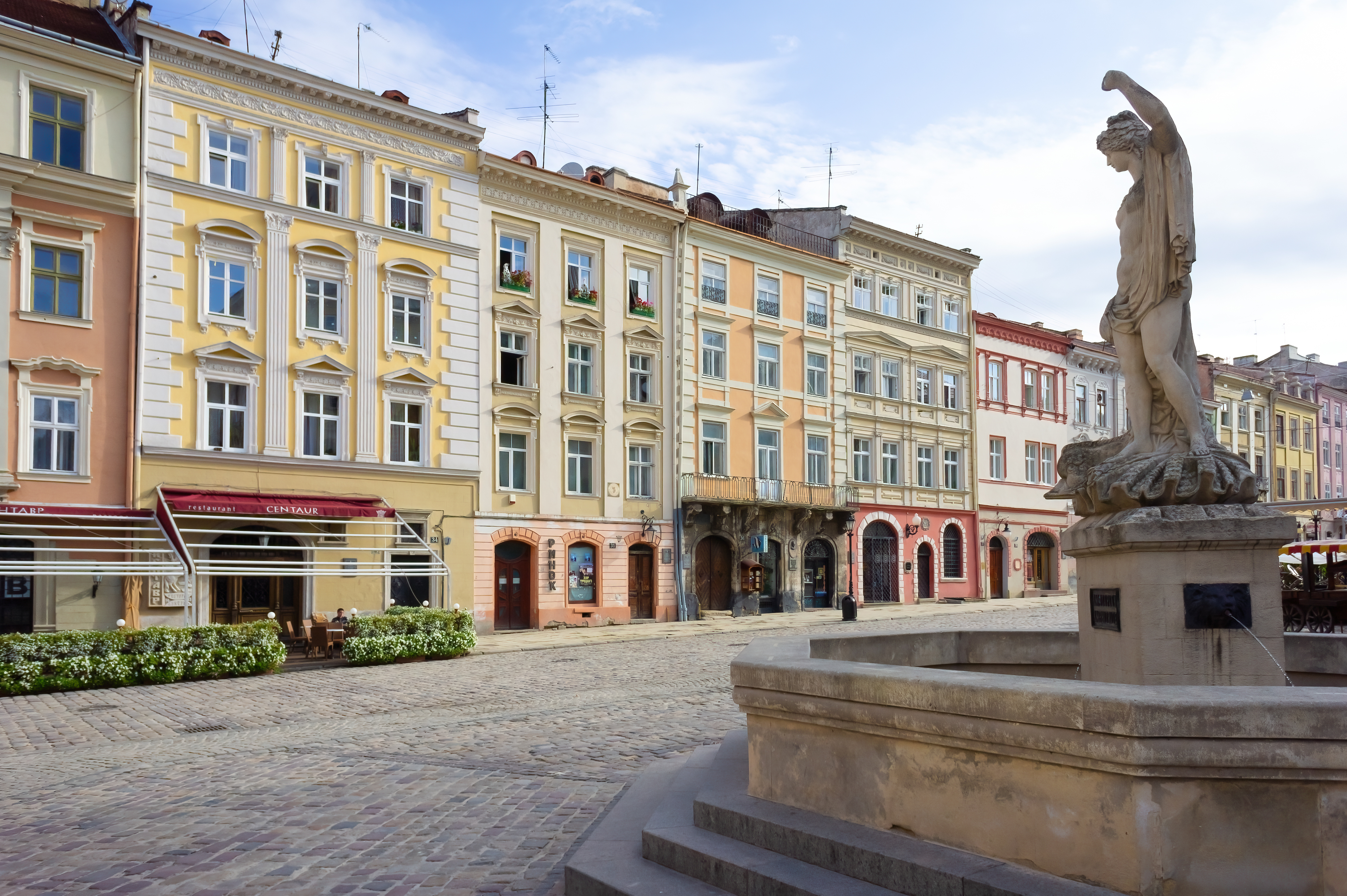
Rynok square, Lviv

In 2012, Ukraine was the 8th most popular tourism destination in Europe with 23 million visitors. The country's tourism industry is generally considered to be underdeveloped, but it does provide crucial support for Ukraine's economy. In 2012, the contribution of tourism to the GDP amounted to ₴28.8 billion, or 2.2% of GDP and directly supported 351,500 jobs (1.7% of total employment).

Ukraine's neighbours (Belarusians, Hungarians, Poles, Russians, and Slovaks) are known to come to Ukraine to purchase products (such as food or gasoline) and presents that are cheaper in Ukraine than in their home countries.

Ukraine has impressive landscapes, ruins of ancient castles, historical parks, vineyards where they produce native wines, unique structures such as Saint Sophia Cathedral or Chersonesos. Officially, there are seven World Heritage Sites in Ukraine. The Carpathian Mountains suitable for skiing, hiking, fishing and hunting. Bukovel — is the largest ski resort in Ukraine situated in the Ivano-Frankivsk Oblast (province) of western Ukraine. The 2010–2011 winter season recorded 1,200,000-day visits with foreigners amounting to 8–10% of all visitors. In 2012, the Bukovel was named the fastest growing ski resort worldwide. The coastline on the Black Sea is a popular summer destination for vacationers, especially Odesa.

=== Infrastructure ===
==== Electrical ====
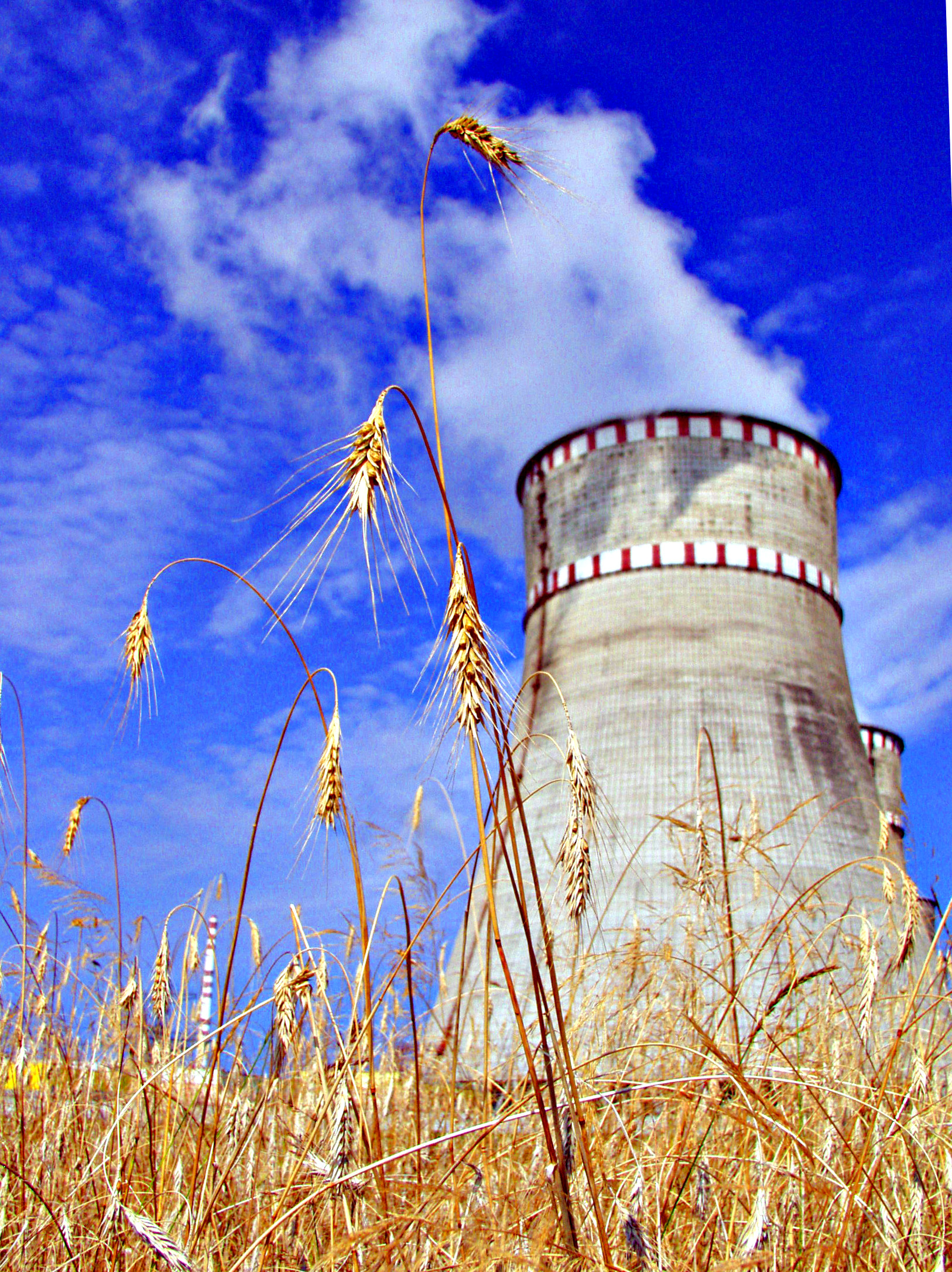
Rivne Nuclear Power Plant in Western Ukraine

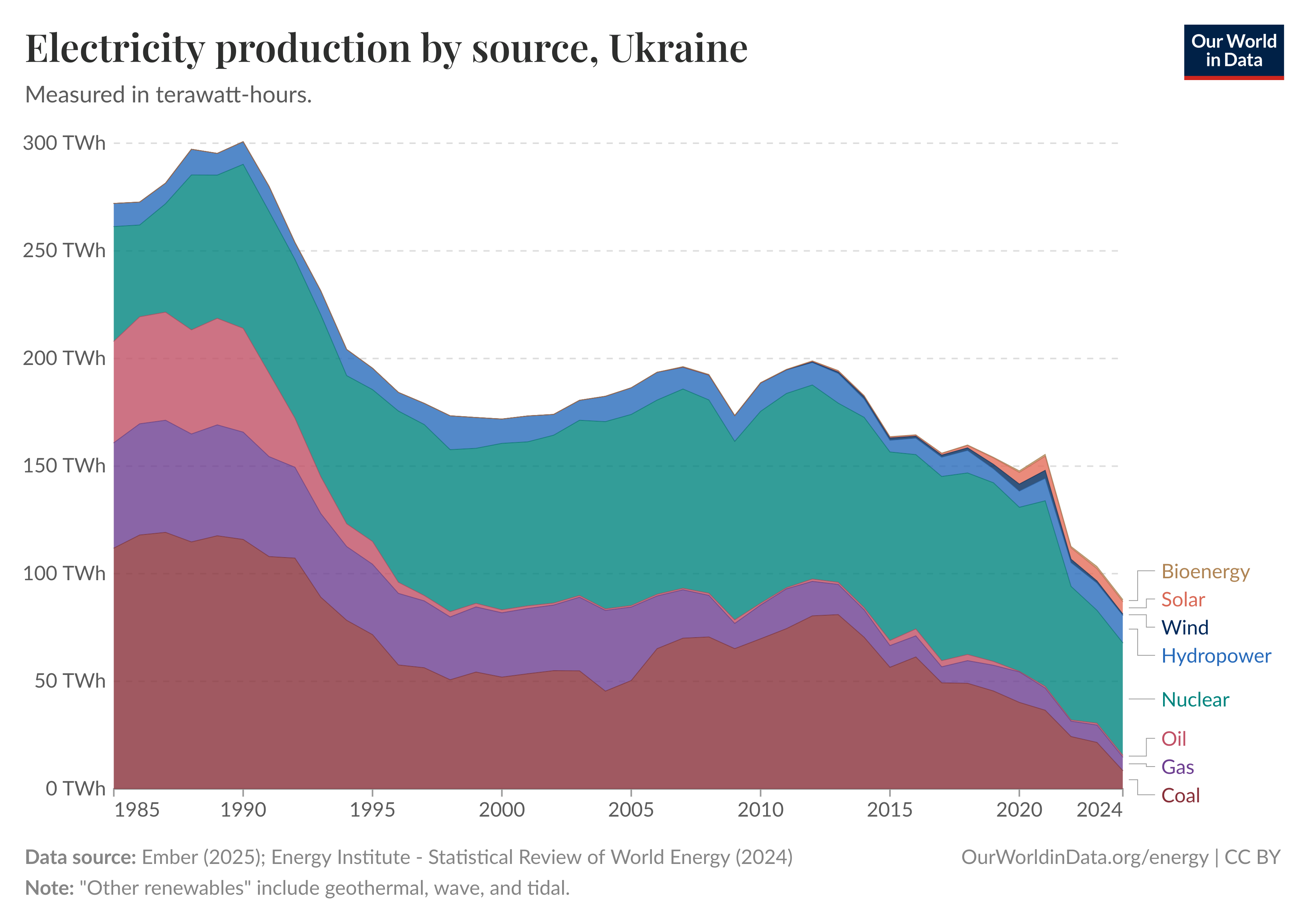
Electricity generation by source

Electricity is an important part of energy in Ukraine. Most electricity generation is nuclear. The bulk of Energoatom output is sold to the government's "guaranteed buyer" to keep prices more stable for domestic customers. Until the 2010s all of Ukraine's nuclear fuel came from Russia, but now most does not.

Some electricity infrastructure was destroyed in the Russo-Ukrainian War, but wind farms, solar power and batteries are thought to be resilient because they are distributed. As of 2025 there is about a third of pre-invasion installed capacity. As of 2025 just over 2 GW can be imported from other European countries, but that is not enough to cover peak demand. Better air defence is needed, and many small gas-turbine generators are being installed to generate flexibly to reduce the blackouts being caused by Russian attacks. As of 2025 the Energy Ministry is prioritising decentralisation for energy security, such as rooftop solar with batteries.

==== Transport ====
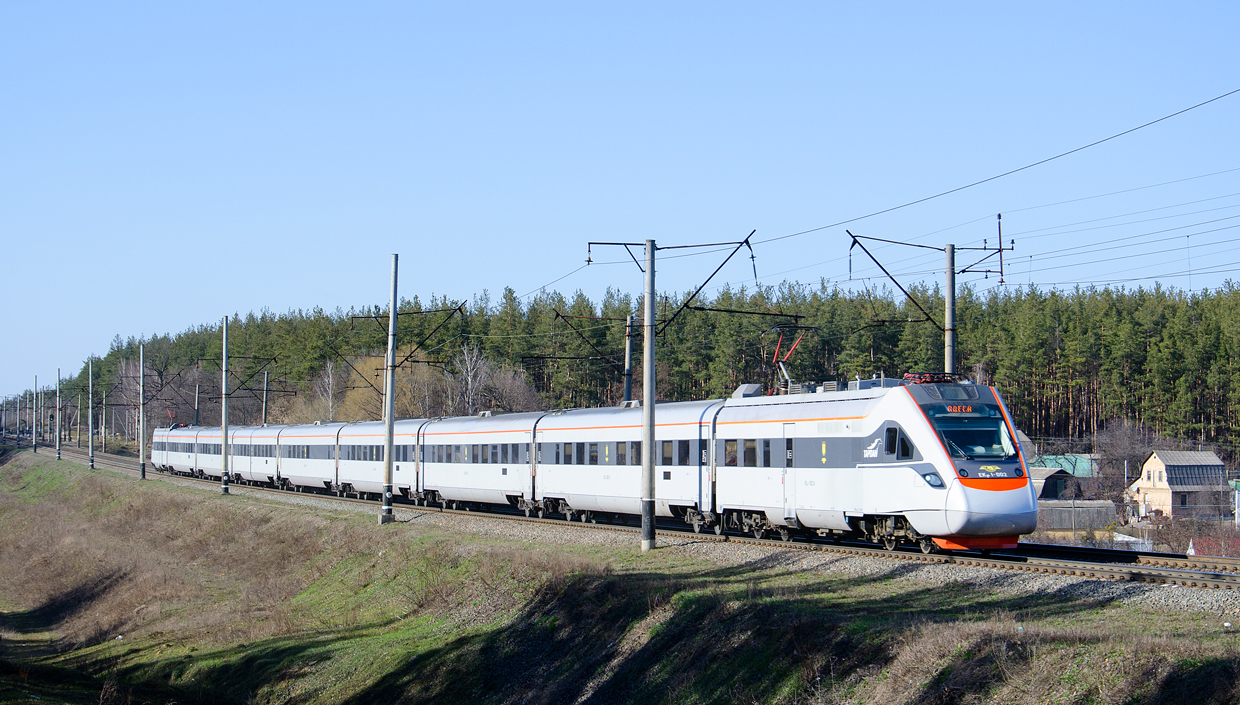
An EKr-1 multiple unit built by Kriukiv Railway Car Building Works. Rail transport is heavily used in Ukraine.

Transport in Ukraine includes ground transportation (road and rail), water (sea and river), air transportation, and pipelines. The transportation sector accounts for roughly 11% of the country's gross domestic product and 7% of total employment.

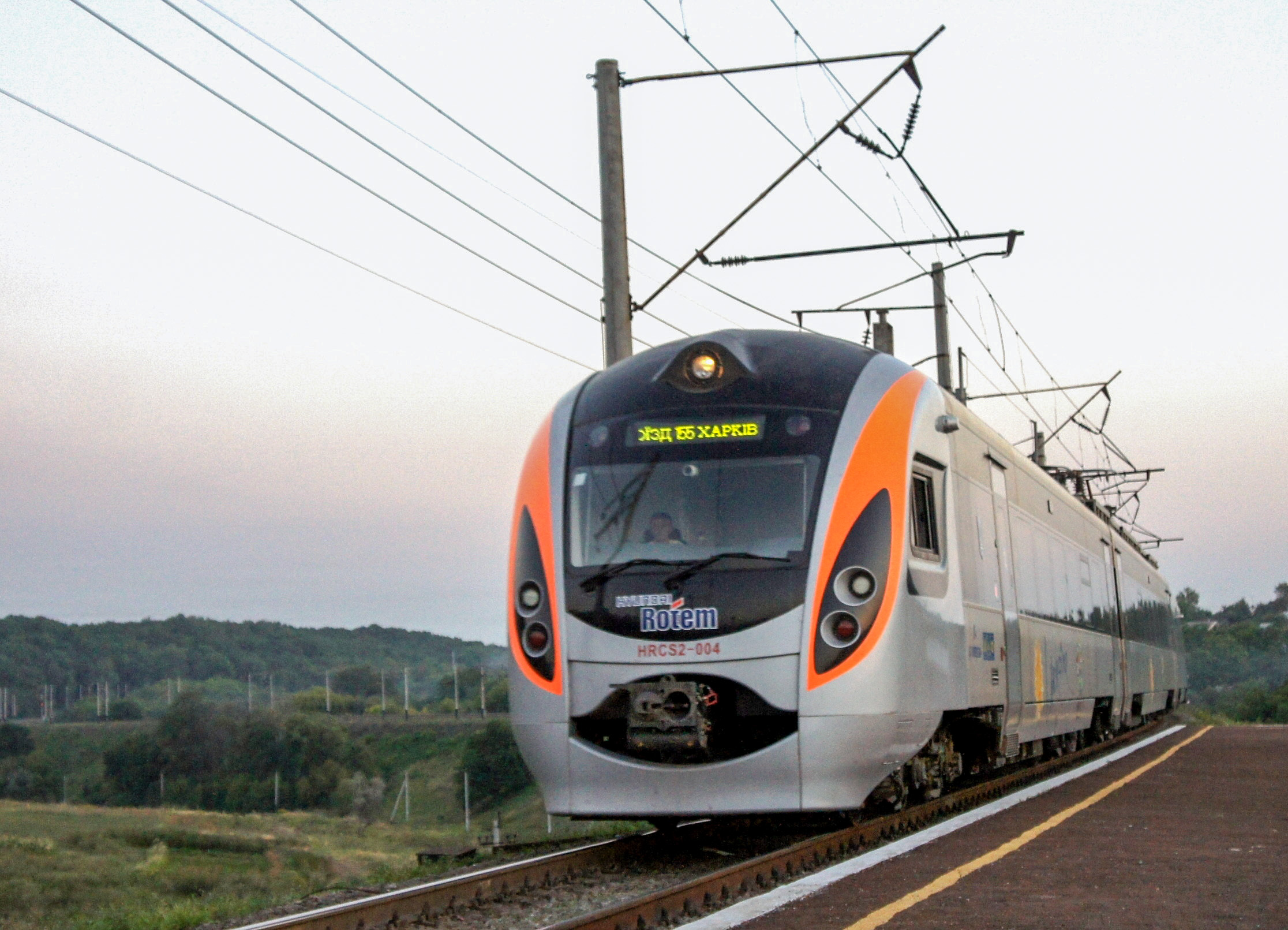
HRCS2 multiple unit. Rail transport is heavily utilised in Ukraine.

In total, Ukrainian paved roads stretch for 164,732 kilometres (102,360 mi). Major routes, marked with the letter 'M' for 'International' (Ukrainian: Міжнародний), extend nationwide and connect all major cities of Ukraine, and provide cross-border routes to the country's neighbours.

International maritime travel is mainly provided through the Port of Odesa, from where ferries sail regularly to Istanbul, Varna and Haifa. The largest ferry company presently operating these routes is Ukrferry.

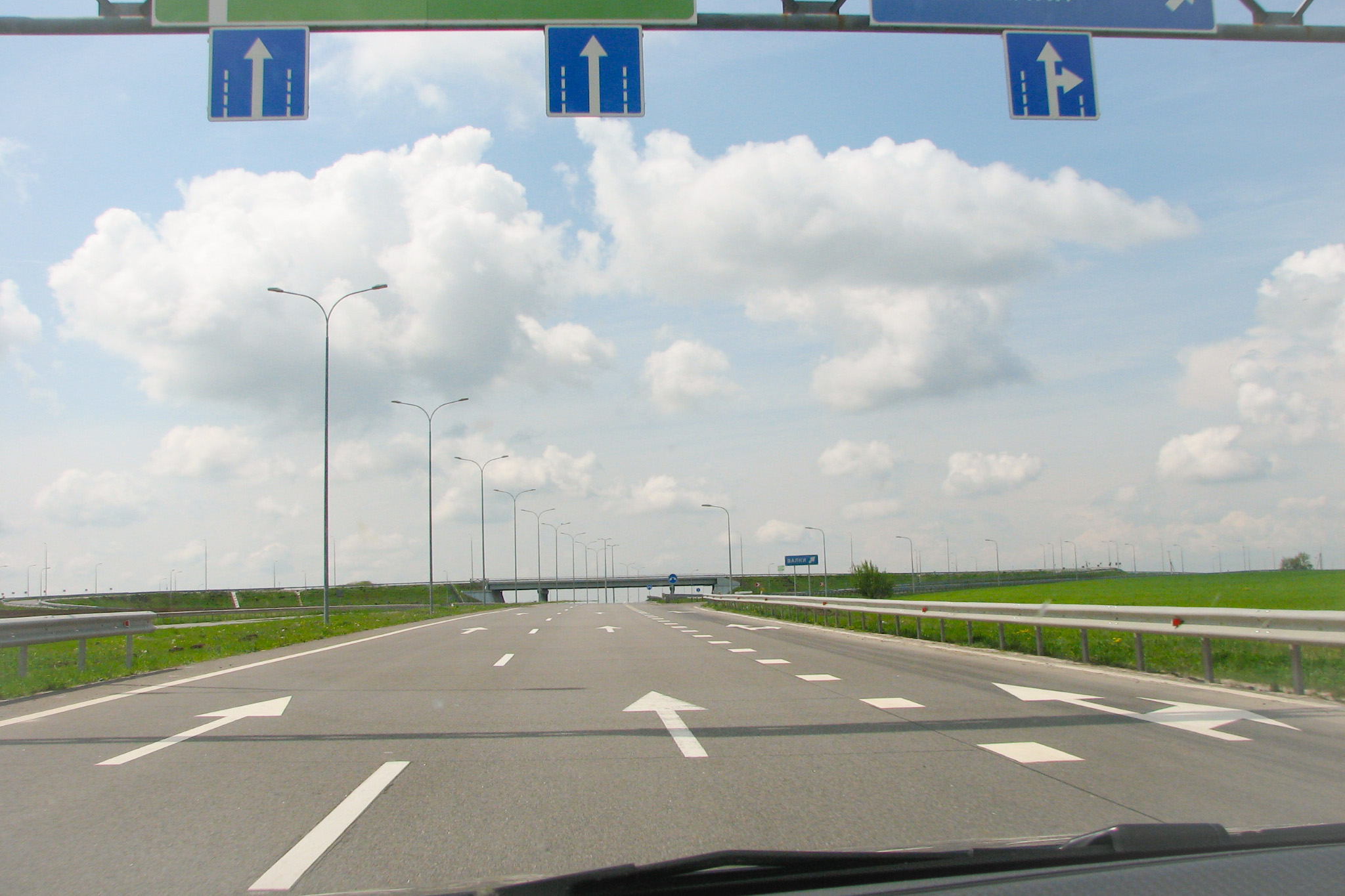
The Kharkiv–Dnipro motorway (M18)

Rail transport in Ukraine connects all major urban areas, port facilities and industrial centres with neighbouring countries. The heaviest concentration of railway track is the Donbas region of Ukraine. Although rail freight transport fell in the 1990s, Ukraine is still one of the world's highest rail users.

The total amount of railroad track in Ukraine extends for 22,473 kilometres (13,964 mi), of which 9,250 kilometres (5,750 mi) was electrified in the 2000s. The state has a monopoly on the provision of passenger rail transport, and all trains, other than those with cooperation of other foreign companies on international routes, are operated by its company Ukrzaliznytsia.

Kyiv Boryspil is Ukraine's largest international airport. It has three main passenger terminals and is the base for the country's flag carrier, Ukraine International Airlines. Other large airports in the country include those in Kharkiv, Lviv and Donetsk (now destroyed). In addition to its flag carrier, Ukraine has a number of airlines including Windrose Airlines, Dniproavia, Azur Air Ukraine, and AtlasGlobal Ukraine. Antonov Airlines, a subsidiary of the Antonov Aerospace Design Bureau, was the only operator of the world's largest fixed wing aircraft, the An-225.

==== Communications ====
Ukraine ranks eighth among the world's nations in terms of the Internet speed with the average download speed of 1,190 kbit/s. Five national providers of fixed (DSL, ADSL, XDSL) internet access — Ukrtelecom, Vega Telecom, Datagroup, Ukrnet, Volia, and 3 national operators of mobile internet – Vodafone Ukraine, Kyivstar, lifecell are currently operating in Ukraine. Every regional centre and large district centre has a number of local providers and home networks.

2011 revenues from Internet service providing in Ukraine reached ₴4.75 billion.

Over 16 million Ukrainians had Internet access in 2012, growing to 22 million in 2015. In Kyiv, 90% of the population had internet access.

The mobile-cellular telephone system's expansion has slowed, largely due to saturation of the market, which has reached 144 mobile phone subscriptions per 100 people.

=== Science and technology ===
Anti-ship missile R-360 Neptune under testing.

Science and technology in Ukraine has its modern development and historical origins in the 18th and 19th centuries and is associated, first of all, with the Kyiv Mohyla Academy, University of Kyiv and University of Kharkiv. The founding of Ukraine's main research institution, the National Academy of Sciences of Ukraine, in 1918 by Volodymyr Vernadsky marked an important milestone in the country's subsequent scientific and technological development.

Ukraine's space science advanced rapidly in the aftermath of World War II, with Korolyov and Chelomey leading the rocket and spaceflight development in the Soviet Union during the Space Race.

The Kharkiv Institute of Physics and Technology was the site of the world's first torsatron-type stellarator, Saturn-1. Today it is the site of the larger Uragan-2M torsatron experiment, which was the largest stellarator in Europe until the commissioning of Wendelstein 7-X in 2015.

Ukraine was ranked 66th in the Global Innovation Index in 2025, down from 57th in 2023, and 49th in 2021.

== Trade and investment ==
Exports of Ukraine by product category (2019) Chemical products Transportation Machines Mineral products Plastics and rubbers Metals Foodstuffs Precious metals Textiles Instruments Animal products Vegetable products Paper goods Footwear and headwear Miscellaneous Stone and glass Wood products Animal and vegetable bi-products Animal hides Arts and antiques Weapons

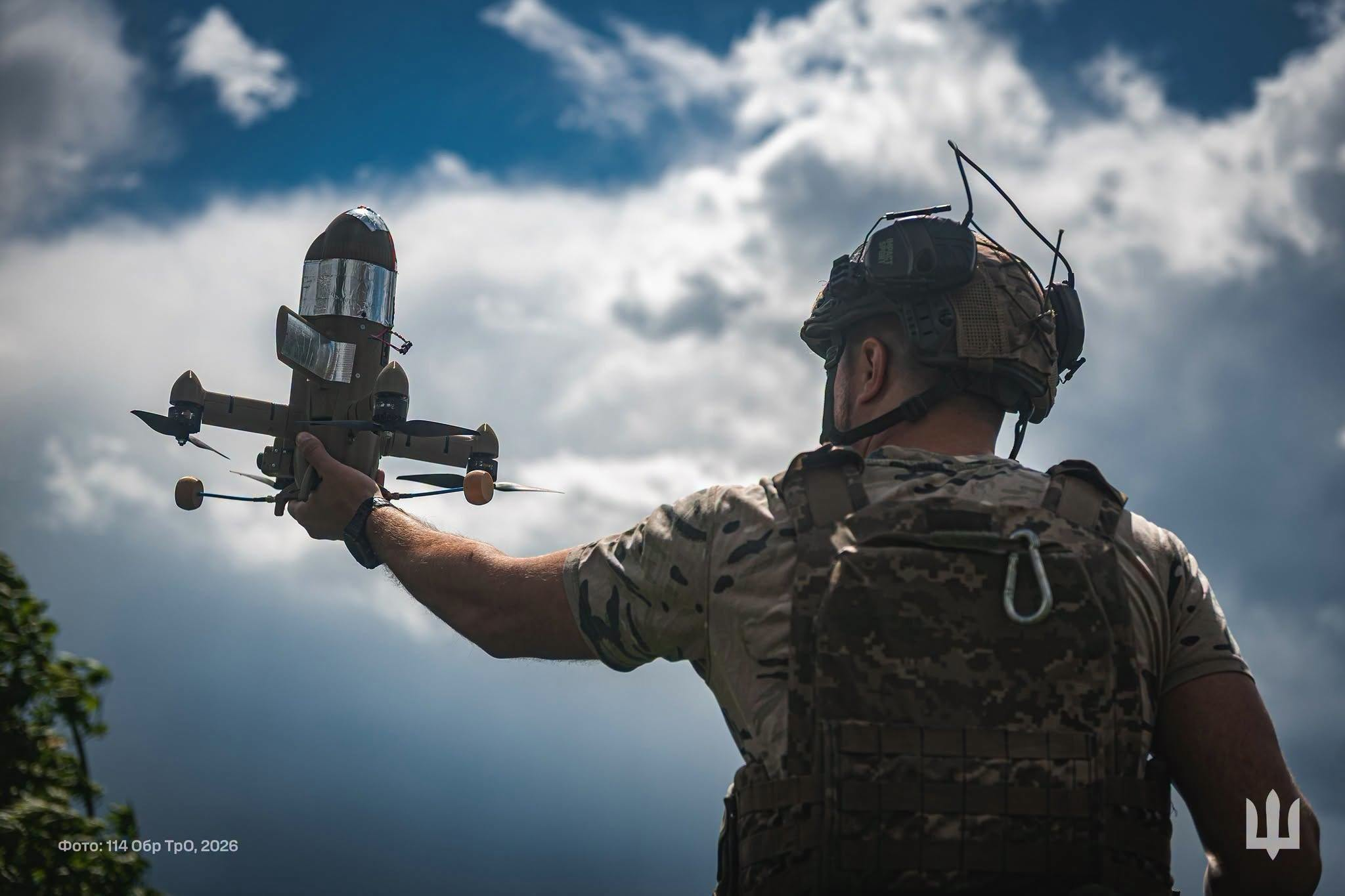
Interceptor drone Sting with the Ukraine soldier

.

Until recently, Russia (Note: Both Russia and Ukraine were part of the Soviet Union since 1922 till Ukraine declared its independence from the Soviet Union on 24 August 1991, and before 1917 they were both part of the Russian Empire.) was Ukraine's largest trading partner with 25.7% of exports and 32.4% of imports in 2012. In 2012, 24.9% of exports and 30.9% of imports were to and from the EU. In 2013, 35.9% of Ukrainian exports went to CIS countries, including eight countries other than Ukraine. Simultaneously, exports to EU countries was 26.6% of all exports.

In 2015 the EU became Ukraine's largest trading partner, accounting for more than a third of its trade. In 2015, Ukrainian exports to Russia had fallen to 12.7%. In 2017, 14.5% of Ukraine's imports came from Russia. In 2017, Ukrainian exports to Russia stood at 9%. In 2017, 40% of Ukraine's exports went to the EU and 15% to CIS countries. Overall, Ukraine increased its exports by 20% in 2017. The growth of imports was faster than the rate of export growth.

In 2015, food and other agricultural products (worth $13 billion), metallurgy ($8.8 billion) and machinery ($4.1 billion) made up most of Ukraine's exports, with trade partners in 217 countries. Exports from Ukraine in 2015 decreased by 29.3% to $38.135 billion. Imports were 31.1% down, to $37.502 billion. In 2017 almost half of Ukraine's exports were provided by the agrarian complex and food industry, slightly more than 20% by metallurgy and nearly 10% by machine building products.

In 2019, China replaced Russia as the largest single-nation trading partner with Ukraine achieved $50.06 billion in export and $60.78 billion in import. Ukraine was the leading agricultural goods provider in the Chinese market.

Natural gas is Ukraine's biggest import and the main cause of the country's structural trade deficit.

Exports of Ukrainian goods in 2024 reached US$41.73 billion.

In the future, drone exports to allies may account for a significant portion of foreign trade value. For example, interest in Ukraine's interceptor drone products.

=== Foreign direct investment ===
To encourage foreign trade and investment, the Ukrainian parliament approved a foreign investment law that would allow foreigners to purchase businesses and property, to repatriate revenue and profits, and to receive compensation if the property is nationalised by a future government. Complex laws and regulations, poor corporate governance, weak enforcement of contract law by courts, and corruption, continued to prevent direct large-scale foreign investment in Ukraine. There is a functioning stock market, but portfolio investment activities have been restricted by a historic lack of protection of shareholders' rights.

As of April 2011, total foreign direct investment stock in Ukraine stood at $44.7 billion. Statistics from FDi Magazine show that Ukraine suffered a year on year decline in foreign direct investment between 2010 and 2013.

State enterprise InvestUkraine was created under the State Agency for Investment and National Projects (National Projects) to serve as a one-stop stop for investors and to deliver investment consulting services.

Ukraine signed a shale gas exploration deal with Royal Dutch Shell on 25 January 2013. The $10 billion deal was the largest foreign direct investment ever for Ukraine.

Many companies, owned by foreigners, have been successfully operating in Ukraine since its independence. These include companies in agriculture, such as Kyiv-Atlantic Group, founded in 1994 by David Sweere. He sold its business in Minnesota and invested in Ukraine, believing in its huge potential. The company has been operating at a profit since 2002. As a result, he became the fifth richest among the Westerners who made their fortune in Ukraine.

In 2016, foreign direct investment in Ukraine's economy amounted to $3.8 billion in 2016, which was almost twice more than in 2015.

== Legal environment and economic support ==
=== Background ===
Since the late 1990s, the Ukrainian government has pledged to reduce the number of government agencies, streamline the regulatory process, create a legal environment to encourage entrepreneurs, and enact a comprehensive tax overhaul. In 2003, the IMF encouraged Ukraine to quicken the pace and scope of reforms, threatening to withdraw financial support.

On 24 June 2010, Ukraine's Foreign Minister Kostyantyn Hryshchenko signed a free trade agreement with the European Free Trade Association (EFTA). According to the Global Competitiveness Report of 2012–2013, "the country's most important challenge is the needed overhaul of its institutional framework, which cannot be relied on because it suffers from red tape, lack of transparency, and favouritism." In reports by the Kyiv Post in 2010 and 2011 respectively, a "double taxation avoidance" treaty with Cyprus signed in 1982 by the Soviet Union has cost Ukraine billions of U.S. dollars of tax revenues.

The 2014 campaign of lustration in Ukraine was criticised by Mark Varga, writing in The National Interest as it might have adverse economic effects. On 29 May 2014, Ukraine entered into the European Union–Ukraine Association Agreement, that reached its full application on 1 September 2017.

=== Corruption ===
Corruption in Ukraine since the country became an independent state in 1991 is a societal issue rooted in the dissolution of the Soviet Union that year. Following independence, Ukrainian politicians from across the political spectrum, criminal bosses, and Ukrainian oligarchs exploited corruption within the National Police of Ukraine, the country's political parties, and industry to gain power. While Ukraine is still considered one of the more corrupt countries in Europe, it has made steady progress in improving its standing since 2015.

=== Poverty ===
Poverty in Ukraine spiked after the Dissolution of the Soviet Union and then substantially declined, before flattening in the twenty-first century.

A large percentage of Romani people in Ukraine live in poverty.

=== Taxation and fiscal policy ===
The organization responsible for tax policy in Ukraine is the State Fiscal Service, operating under the Ministry of Finance of Ukraine. Taxation is legally regulated by the Taxation Code of Ukraine. The calendar year serves as a fiscal year in Ukraine. The most important sources of tax revenue in Ukraine are unified social security contributions, value added tax, individual income tax. In 2017 taxes collected formed 23% of GDP at ₴969.654 billion.

=== Dual citizenship ===
In June 2025, Ukraine legalized dual citizenship.

=== Foreign workers ===
A number of foreign guest workers come to work in Ukraine, mainly in seasonal farm work and construction industry, especially from neighbouring Moldova and Belarus.

== Environmental issues ==
Ukraine is interested in cooperating on regional environmental issues. Conservation of natural resources is a stated high priority, although implementation suffers from a lack of financial resources. Ukraine established its first nature preserve, Askania-Nova, in 1921 and has programs to breed endangered species.

Ukraine has a Ministry of Environment and has introduced a pollution fee system that levies taxes on air and water emissions and solid waste disposal. The resulting revenues are channelled to environmental protection activities, but enforcement of this pollution fee system is lax. Industrial pollution remains a considerable problem in Ukraine.

Significant environmental problems result from the Chernobyl nuclear power plant disaster in 1986. In accordance with its previously announced plans, Ukraine permanently closed the Chernobyl Atomic Energy Station in December 2000. In November 2001, Ukraine withdrew an application it had made to the EBRD for funding to complete two new reactor units to compensate for the energy once produced by Chernobyl. Ukrainian concern over reform conditions attached to the loan – particularly tariff increases needed to ensure loan repayment—led the Ukrainian government to withdraw the application on the day the EBRD Board was to have considered final approval.

The Russo-Ukrainian War significantly impacts the environmental situation. Thirty-six thousand tons of waste, including toxic chemicals such as copper and zinc, have entered water bodies, posing dangers to human organs and the nervous system. Three million hectares of forests need to be demined, and forest fires caused by shelling occur in 30% of the country's forest area. The war has released approximately 67,532,788 tons of hazardous emissions, causing respiratory and cardiovascular issues.

== Ukrainian companies ==
In 2022, the sector with the highest number of companies registered in Ukraine is Services with 512,393 companies followed by Wholesale Trade and Manufacturing with 288,072 and 93,637 companies respectively.

- 1+1 Media Group – Media
- 4AGames – Technology
- Antonov – Industrials
- APEKS-BANK – Financials
- ATB-Market – Consumer services
- BG Capital – Financials
- Bogdan group – Industrials
- Chumak – Consumer goods
- Ciklum – IT
- DTEK – Oil & Gaz, basic materials, utilities
- EKTA – Technology
- Electron – Industrials
- Epicentre K – Consumer services
- ESTA Holding – Financials
- FED – Aerospace industry
- Ferreexpo – Basic materials
- FOM-Ukraine – Industrials
- Fozzy Group – Consumer services
- Galnaftogaz – Oil & Gas
- GSC Game World – Technology
- Hromadske.ua – Media
- Industrial Union of Donbas – Industrials
- InvestUkraine – Industrials
- Kryukiv Railway Car Building Works – Industrials
- Kyivstar – Telecommunications
- Kuznia na Rybalskomu – Shipbuilding, arms industry
- Lifecell – Telecommunications
- METRO Cash&Carry – Consumer services
- MHP – Consumer goods
- Motor Sich – Industrials
- Nemiroff – Consumer goods
- Naftogaz – Oil & Gas
- Nibulon – Agriculture & Shipbuilding
- Obolon – Consumer goods
- Oschadbank – Banking
- PrivatBank – Banking
- Roshen – Consumer goods
- SCM Holdings – Financials
- SoftServe – IT
- Ukraine International Airlines – Consumer services
- Ukrainian Automobile Corporation – Consumer goods
- Ukrainian Railways – Consumer services, Industrials
- Ukrnafta – Oil & gas
- Ukroboronprom
- Ukrtelecom – Telecommunications
- Vodafone Ukraine – Telecommunications
- WOG – Oil & gas, consumer services
- Pivdenmash – Industrials
- Zaporizhstal – Basic materials
- ZAZ – Consumer goods

== Facts and figures ==
Household income or consumption by percentage share:

- lowest 10%: 3.4% (2006)
- highest 10%: 25.7% (2006)

Poverty rate: 4% in 2018 (below US$5.5/day).

Industrial production growth rate: 6% (2007 est.), 6.5 (2008) (Note: The data for the 2009 fiscal year is missing due to the fact that State Statistics Service of Ukraine is transitioning for the international standards of accounting.)

Electricity:

- production: 192.1 billion kWh (2006)
- consumption: 181.9 billion kWh (2006)
- export: 10.07 billion kWh (2005)
- import: 20 billion kWh (2006)

Electricity – production by source:

- fossil fuel: 48.6%
- hydro: 7.9%
- nuclear: 43.5%
- other: 0% (2001)

Oil:

- production: 90,400 barrels per day (14,370 m^{3}/d) (2006)
- consumption: 284,600 barrels per day (45,250 m^{3}/d) (2006)
- exports: 214,600 barrels per day (34,120 m^{3}/d) (2004)
- imports: 469,600 barrels per day (74,660 m^{3}/d) (2004)
- proved reserves: 395,000,000 barrels (62,800,000 m^{3}) (1 January 2006 est.)

Natural gas:

- production: 20.85 billion cubic m (2006 est.)
- consumption: 73.94 billion cubic m (2006 est.)
- exports: 4 billion cubic m (2006 est.)
- imports: 57.09 billion cubic m (2006 est.)
- proved reserves: 1.075 trillion cubic m (1 January 2006 est.)

Agriculture – exports: grain, sugar beets, sunflower seeds, vegetables, beef, milk, natural honey.

Agriculture – imports: seafood, pork, beef, grain.

Exchange rates: hryvnia per US$1 – 22 (2015), 7.97 (2009), 5.05 (2007), 5.05 (2006), 5.13 (2005), 5.33 (May 2004), 5.30 (October 2002), 5.59 (February 2000), 5.3811 (January 2000), 4.1304 (1999), 2.4495 (1998), 1.8617 (1997), 1.8295 (1996), 1.4731 (1995)

Minimum wage: ₴6,000/ ~$210 per month (from 2021 to 2001–01)

Average salary by region

== See also ==
- List of companies of Ukraine
- List of Ukrainian oblasts and territories by salary
- List of Ukrainian subdivisions by GRP
- List of Ukrainians by net worth
- Donornomics
- Federation of Employers of Ukraine
- Gambling in Ukraine
- Labor migration from Ukraine
- Made in Ukraine
- Ministry of Economy (Ukraine)
- Ministry of Finance (Ukraine)
- Ministry of Strategic Industries
- National Bank of Ukraine
- Philanthropy in Ukraine
- Privatisation in Ukraine
- State Audit Service of Ukraine
- State Tax Service of Ukraine
- State Treasury Service of Ukraine
- Ukrainian oligarchs
- Ukraine–United Kingdom Political, Free Trade and Strategic Partnership Agreement
- Economy of Europe
