= Labor migration from Ukraine =

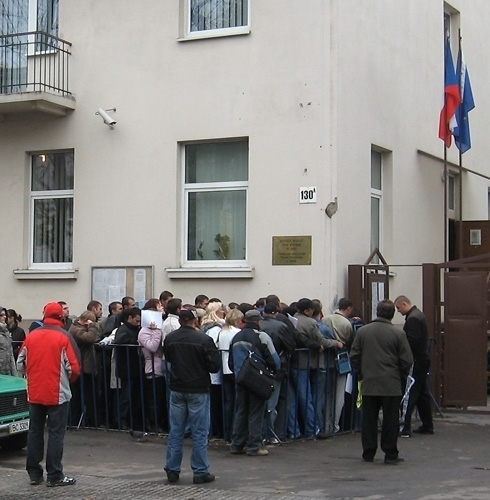
Citizens of Ukraine in line at the Consulate of the Czech Republic in Lviv

Labor migration from Ukraine is a labor migration of citizens of Ukraine to the Post-Soviet states and other foreign countries.

== Terminology ==
In Ukraine, a term to denote such migrants appeared — “заробітча́ни” (zarobitchany, literary “earners”), which refers to the numerous Russian- and Ukrainian-speaking economic migrants working in the Post-Soviet states, central and western Europe and in Kyiv, Ukraine's capital, in 1990-2000-ies. The term is mostly used in Ukraine, in Ukrainian- and Russian-speaking media.

== Statistics ==
In 2008 the total number of labor migrants from Ukraine was estimated to be 4.5 million people. Their contribution to the economy of Ukraine is considerable. In particular, only Ukrainian labor migrants working in the EU countries sent 27 billion euros to Ukraine in 2007, which amounted to 8% of Ukraine's GDP.

According to the data of L. Drozdova, Deputy Minister for Social Policy, in 2013, the average salary of a labor migrant per month was US$930, while in Ukraine it constituted US$380.

== See also ==
- Economy of Ukraine
- Gastarbeiter
