= Global Sourcing Association =

Trade association promoting effective global outsourcing

- Company type: Public
- Industry: Outsourcing
- Founded: 1987
- Headquarters: London, England, United Kingdom
- Members: 350 (2011)
- Website: www.gsa-uk.com

The Global Sourcing Association was founded as the National Outsourcing Association (NOA) in the United Kingdom in 1987 by Martyn Hart. The organization was the first European association to promote effective outsourcing and it is the parent of the federal European Outsourcing Association.

The NOA operated as a not-for-profit trade association aimed to promote best practices in outsourcing, lobbying government and regulators, and provided research and information to companies and managers using outsourcing. The NOA developed Pathway, a university accredited professional development qualification for the UK's outsourcing industry.

The NOA included the OUT Group, as the commercial arm of the NOA which was created in 2004. The NOA is also associated with sourcingfocus.com, a leading online news resource portal for the sourcing community.

In October 2016, the NOA changed its name to the Global Sourcing Association, a move reflecting the changing nature of outsourcing against a backdrop of increasing globalization and advancing technologies. The new brand was launched in Sofia, Bulgaria on the first day of the NOA's European Outsourcing Conference to an audience of international CEOs and Presidents of sourcing associations and institutions from around the world. The Bulgarian Head of State at the time, President Rosen Plevneliev, opened the conference and delivered a keynote speech.

The company celebrated its 30th anniversary in 2017, and currently boasts over 300 corporate members which are split into three member categories: buyers, suppliers, and support service companies. A large number of members are blue-chip user organizations, with some of the member companies managing the largest outsourcing arrangements in Europe.

== Outsource magazine ==
In 2006 the NOA partnered with Outsource magazine (published by EMP Media), an independent magazine serving the outsourcing space and the first magazine to do so. Outsource magazine became the NOA's official partner magazine. Additionally, Outsource became the first magazine serving the outsourcing sector to achieve ABC audit in Sep 2011.

In 2017, Outsource magazine changed its name to Future of Sourcing and transitioned from print to a purely digital publication.
