= Philanthropy in Ukraine =

- Philanthropy in Ukraine
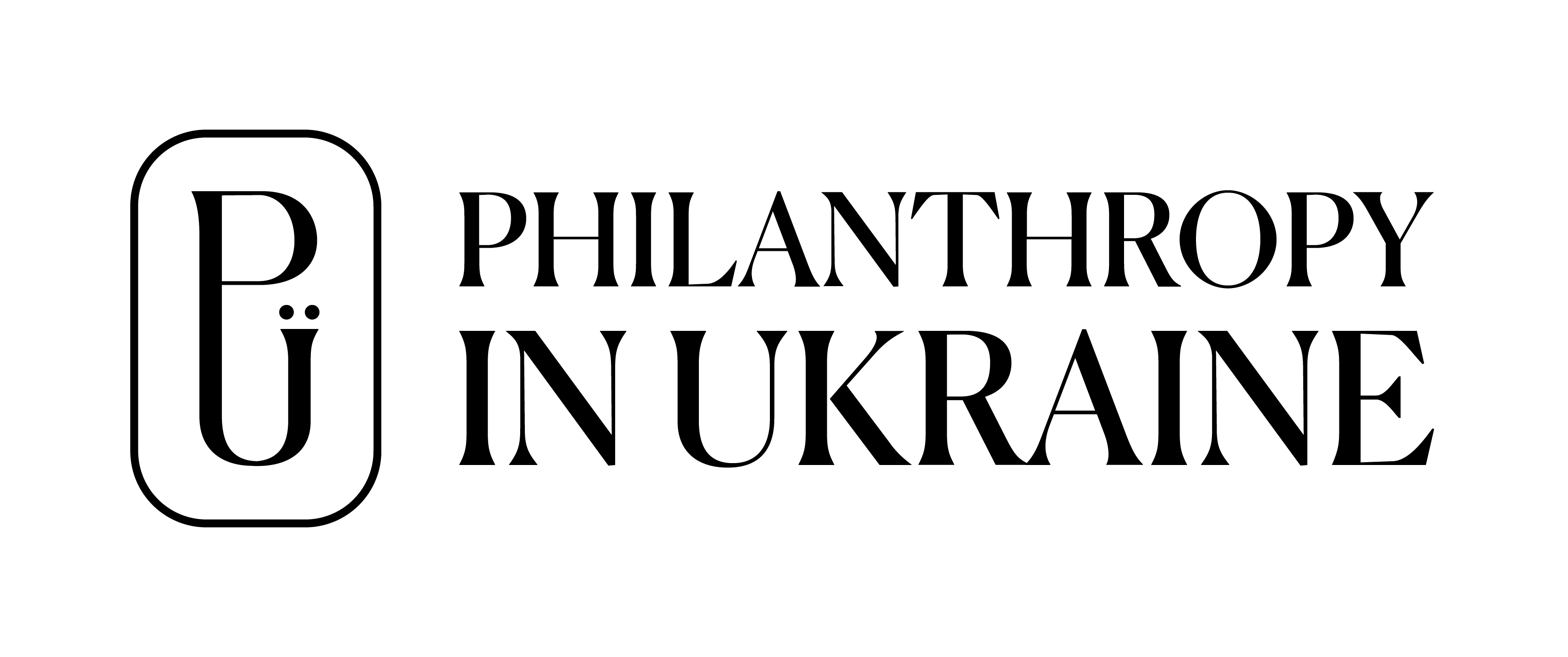
- Abbreviation: PIU
- Formation: 2023
- Founders: Yevheniia Mazurenko, Anna Nishnianidze, Liubov Rainchuk
- Type: Charitable organization
- Registration no.: 45134560
- Purpose: Development of philanthropy in Ukraine
- Head: Anna Nishnianidze
- Website: https://philanthropyinukraine.org/

Philanthropy in Ukraine (Ukrainian: «Філантропія в Україні») is a Ukrainian non-governmental organization (NGO) that promotes the development of philanthropy and strengthens the institutional capacity of Ukrainian NGOs. Its key project is PhilinUA, a due diligence platform for verifying and mapping non-profit organizations.

== History ==
The organization was founded in 2023 by Yevheniia Mazurenko, Anna Nishnianidze, and Liubov Rainchuk. Its main goal is to make the Ukrainian non-profit sector more visible and reliable for international partners through the implementation of a comprehensive organizational verification system.

The launch of the pilot program and the testing of its methodology were reported by Ukrainian media, highlighting its importance for international donors and the development of fundraising in Ukraine.

In 2024–2025, Philanthropy in Ukraine conducted a pilot assessment of 18 organizations and prepared the first analytical report, which became the basis for further scaling of the program.

== Activities ==
The organization operates in three main areas:

- Verification and mapping of NGOs — creating a database of verified organizations for international donors;
- Educational programs for NGOs — courses and workshops on institutional development and fundraising, which were covered by Ukrainian media;
- Analytical work — research on the state of the non-profit sector and donor needs.

The organization’s activities have attracted the attention of international publications, which noted that Ukrainian non-profits face a lack of long-term funding and staff burnout, and that transparency initiatives such as PIU can help change the situation.

== Research ==
The NGO has conducted two studies:

- Expectations and Challenges of Donors in Ukraine
- Challenges and Needs of the Ukrainian Non-Profit Sector

== International Cooperation ==
Philanthropy in Ukraine cooperates with the international humanitarian organization Help – Hilfe zur Selbsthilfe within the Help Localization Facility (HLF) program. Within this project, the NGO conducted due diligence procedures for Ukrainian NGOs applying for German donor funding.

== Partners ==
- Global Giving
- Center for Disaster Philanthropy
- Disasters Emergency Committee members:
  - Christian Aid
  - CAFOD
  - CARE International UK
  - Save the Children UK

== Supervisory Board ==
- Serhiy Lukachko (CEO of My City)
- Liz Harrison (Humanitarian Expert)
- Theresa Crawford (Strategy and Organizational Development Consultant, Co‑Founder of IPKO Foundation)
- Isabella Jean (Former Director of Collaborative Learning at CDA)
- Yevheniia Mazurenko (Member of the Supervisory Board of the Voices of Children Charitable Foundation)

== Awards ==
The organization received 3rd place in the national competition "Charitable Ukraine 2025" in the category Innovations in Philanthropy.
