= Outsource magazine =

Outsource Magazine
- Editor: Jamie Liddell
- Categories: Business
- Frequency: Quarterly
- Circulation: 11,361 (2012)
- Publisher: EMP Media Ltd
- Founded: 2005
- Country: UK
- Language: English
- Website: outsourcemagazine.co.uk

Outsource is a news publication on sourcing and shoring strategy. The magazine has a circulation verified by the ABC during January and December 2012 of 11,361 (average per issue) making it the first magazine in the outsourcing sector to achieve this audited status

Outsource is one of several of magazines published by EMP Media Ltd. It is a quarterly B2B title that has provided news on outsourcing since 2005

In February 2012 Outsource announced a partnership with the ACCA (Association of Chartered Certified Accountants), the global professional body for accountants.

In 2018 Outsource magazine changed its name to Future of Sourcing and transitioned to a digitally published platform.
