= InvestUkraine =

Invest Ukraine (IU)
- Інвестуй в Україну (ІУ)

Agency overview
- Formed: 22 May 2009
- Type: Ministry department
- Jurisdiction: Ukraine
- Headquarters: 12/2, M. Hrushevsky st, Kyiv, Ukraine, 01008
- Employees: 120 (2016)
- Minister responsible: Stepan Kubiv, Minister of Economy
- Parent department: Cabinet of Ministers via Ministry of Economic Development and Trade (Ukraine)
- Parent agency: Ministry of Economic Development and Trade (Ukraine)
- Website: Page on MFA website

Map
- Jurisdiction of the agency Headquarters (Kyiv) marked with red dot

Invest Ukraine is a state enterprise operating under the State Agency for Investment and National Projects (National Projects), which serves as a one stop shop for investors and delivers investments consulting services in Ukraine. It was founded on 22 May 2009 and included in National Project's structure on 30 June 2010.

== Activity ==
Invest Ukraine provides professional services, including information about investment opportunities and liaison within the Government to prospective and current investors. It promotes Ukraine as an investment destination through networking, conferences and events, media relations, Ukraine's diplomatic missions abroad, and thought leadership. InvestUkraine is located in Kyiv, Ukraine and features a multilingual staff.

Invest Ukraine provides services to prospective and current investors free of charge. Activities include:

- Providing information about investment opportunities
- Assisting with identifying and locating project sites, vendors, service providers, and other resources
- Initiating contact with potential investment partners and maintaining investment projects database
- Liaison with government agencies and officials
- Linking investors with regional and local community leaders
- Providing assistance in registering a business in Ukraine
