= List of companies of Ukraine =

Location of Ukraine

Ukraine is a sovereign state in Eastern Europe, Ukraine has an area of 603,628 km^{2} (233,062 sq mi), making it the largest country entirely within Europe and the 46th largest country in the world, and a population of about 44.5 million, making it the 32nd most populous country in the world.

Ukraine has long been a global breadbasket because of its extensive, fertile farmlands, and it remains one of the world's largest grain exporters. The diversified economy of Ukraine includes a large heavy industry sector, particularly in aerospace and industrial equipment.

For further information on the types of business entities in this country and their abbreviations, see "Business entities in Ukraine".

== Notable firms ==
This list includes notable companies with primary headquarters located in the country. The industry and sector follow the Industry Classification Benchmark taxonomy. Organizations which have ceased operations are included and noted as defunct.

Notable companies Status: P=Private, S=State; A=Active, D=Defunct
Name	Industry	Sector	Headquarters	Founded	Notes	Status	
Aeros	Industrials	Aerospace	Kyiv	1992	Aircraft	P	A
Amstor	Consumer services	Real estate development	?	2003	Retail	P	A
Antonov	Industrials	Aerospace	Kyiv	1946	State-owned, aircraft	S	A
APEKS-BANK	Financials	Banks	Kyiv	2009	Bank	P	A
ASKA Insurance Company	Financials	Full line insurance	Kyiv	1990	Private insurance	P	A
ATB-Market	Consumer services	Food retailers & wholesalers	Dnipro	1993	Grocery	P	A
Azovstal Iron and Steel Works	Basic materials	Iron & steel	Mariupol	1930	Steel/iron	P	A
Berdichev machine-building plant	Industrials	Industrial machinery	Berdychiv	1880	Machinery	P	A
BG Capital	Financials	Banks	Kyiv	2000	Investment banking	P	A
Bogdan group	Industrials	Commercial vehicles & trucks	Cherkasy	2005	Automotive, car, bus	P	A
Central Iron Ore Enrichment Works	Basic materials	Iron & steel	Kryvyi Rih	1961	Iron ore, part of Metinvest	P	A
Chumak	Consumer goods	Food products	Kakhovka	1996	Food processing	P	A
Darnytsia	Health care	Pharmaceuticals	Kyiv	1930	Pharmaceuticals	P	A
Dnieper Metallurgical Combine	Basic materials	Iron & steel	Kamianske	1887	Metallurgical	P	A
Donetsk Metallurgical Plant	Basic materials	Iron & steel	Donetsk	1872	Metallurgical	P	A
DTEK	Oil&Gaz, Basic Materials, Utilities	O/G producers, Mining, Electricity	Kyiv	2005	Energy holding company, division of SCM Holdings	P	A
EKTA	Technology	Computer hardware	Kyiv	1992	Display tech	P	A
Energoatom	Energy	Electricity	Kyiv	1996	Nuclear power	S	A
Epicentr K	Consumer services	Home improvement retailers	Kyiv	2003	Home improvement	P	A
ESTA Holding	Financials	Real estate holding & development	Donetsk	2006	Real estate	P	A
Farmak	Health care	Pharmaceuticals	Kyiv	1925	Pharmaceuticals	P	A
Ferrexpo	Basic Materials	Iron & Steel	Horishni Plavni	1960	Mining in Ukraine, trading from Switzerland	P	A
FOM-Ukraine	Industrials	Business support services	Kyiv	2006	Political and polling	P	A
Fozzy Group	Consumer services	Food retailers & wholesalers	Kyiv	1997	Retail food	P	A
Galnaftogaz	Oil & gas	Integrated oil & gas	Lviv	2001	Gas chain	P	A
Glusco	Oil & Gas, Consumer services	Oil Equipment & Services, Food retailers	Kyiv	2016	Gas retail	P	A
Holography Ltd.	Industrials	Diversified industrials	Kyiv	2000	Holograms, printing	P	A
Illich Steel and Iron Works	Basic materials	Iron & steel	Mariupol	1897	Metallurgical	P	A
Industrial Union of Donbas	Industrials	Iron & steel	Kramatorsk (Note: temporarily, due to the Russian aggression, originally in Donetsk)	1995	Steel, steel pipes, coke	P	A
Ingulets Iron Ore Enrichment Works	Basic materials	Iron & steel	Kryvyi Rih	1965	Iron, part of Metinvest	P	A
Intertelecom	Telecommunications	Mobile telecommunications	Odesa	1998	Mobile network	P	A
Interpipe Group	Industrials	Diversified industrials	Dnipro	1990	Metal milling, pipes	P	A
InvestUkraine	Industrials	Business support services	Kyiv	2009	Investment and consulting advisory	P	A
KDD Group	Financials	Real estate holding & development	Kyiv	1994	Real estate, development	P	A
Khortytsia	Consumer goods	Distillers & vintners	Zaporizhzhia	2003	Vodka, alcoholic beverages	P	A
Kyiv Roshen Factory	Consumer goods	Food products	Kyiv	1874	Confectionery	P	A
KrAZ	Industrial	Automobile Manufacturing	Kremenchuk	1946	Heavy-Duty Trucks	P	A
Kryukiv Railway Car Building Works	Industrials	Railway Cars	Kremenchuk	1869	Railway Cars, Metro Cars	P	A
Kryvorizhstal	Basic materials	Iron & steel	Kryvyi Rih	1931	Steel, parent is ArcelorMittal (Luxembourg)	P	A
Kuznya na Rybalskomu	Industrials	Industrial transportation	Kyiv	1928	Shipbuilding, defense	P	A
Kyivmiskbud	Industrials	Heavy construction	Kyiv	1955	Development	P	A
Kyivpastrans	Consumer services	Transport	Kyiv	2001	Public transport	S	A
Kyivstar	Telecommunications	Mobile telecommunications	Kyiv	1994	Mobile network	P	A
Malyshev Factory	Industrials	Industrial machinery	Kharkiv	1945	Defence	S	A
Metinvest	Basic materials	General mining	Donetsk	2006	Mining holding company, division of SCM Holdings	P	A
MHP	Consumer Goods	Food Producers	Kyiv	1998	Mostly meat products (chicken, primarily)	P	A
Motor Sich	Industrials	Industrial machinery	Zaporizhzhia	1907	Engines	P	A
Multiplex Cinema	Consumer services	Recreational services	Kyiv	2003	Cinemas	P	A
Naftogaz	Oil & gas	Exploration & production	Kyiv	1991	State owned natural gas and crude oil	S	A
Nemiroff	Consumer goods	Distillers & vintners	Nemyriv	1992	Vodka, alcoholic beverages	P	A
Nibulon	Agriculture	Production and export	Mykolaiv	1991	Grains wheat, barley, corn	P	A
Novokramatorsky Mashinostroitelny Zavod	Industrials	Industrial machinery	Kramatorsk	1934	Heavy equipment	P	A
Obolon	Consumer goods	Soft drinks	Kyiv	1980	Beverages, soda, water	P	A
Oschadbank	Financials	Banks	Kyiv	1999	Banking	P	A
Ostchem Holding	Chemicals	commodity chemicals		2004	Fertilizers, liquid nitrogen, sodium carbonate, part of Group DF (see Dmytro Firtash)	P	A
PrivatBank	Financials	Banks	Dnipro	1992	Banking	P	A
Roshen	Consumer goods	Food products	Kyiv	1996	Confectionery	P	A
Rukavychka	Consumer goods	Food products	Bibrka	2003	Supermarket chain	P	A
Sandora	Consumer goods	Beverages	Mykolaiv	1995	Part of PepsiCo	P	A
SCM Holdings	Financials	Investment services	Donetsk	2000	Investments	P	A
State Export-Import Bank of Ukraine	Financials	Banks	Kyiv	1992	Banking	S	A
Suspilne	Consumer services	Broadcasting	Kyiv	1965	Public broadcasting	S	A
Svitoch	Consumer goods	Food products	Lviv	1962	Subsidiary of Nestlé	P	A
Ukraine International Airlines	Consumer services	Airlines	Kyiv	1992	Airline	P	A
Ukrainian Automobile Corporation	Consumer goods	Automobiles & Parts	Kyiv	1969	Assumed control of ZAZ and AvtoZAZ in 2002	P	A
Ukrainian Railways	Consumer services, Industrials	Travel, Railroads	Kyiv	1991	Rail track maintenance, transit services	S	A
Ukrainian Sea Ports Authority	Industrials	Port services	Kyiv	2013	Maritime transport	S	A
Ukrainskiy Retail	Consumer services	Food retailers & wholesalers	Donetsk	2006	Retail	P	A
Ukrenergo	Utilities	Electricity	Kyiv	1998	Electricity transmission system operator	S	A
Ukrsibbank	Financials	Banks	Kyiv	1990	Subsidiary of BNP Paribas	P	A
Ukroboronprom	Industrials	Defense	Kyiv	2010	Defense	S	A
Ukrhydroenergo	Energy	Hydroelectricity	Vyshhorod	1994	State power	S	A
Ukrnafta	Oil & gas	Exploration & production	Kyiv	2004	Refining	P	A
Ukrposhta	Consumer services	Delivery services	Kyiv	1947	Postal service	S	A
Ukrspetsexport	Industrials	Defense	Kyiv	1996	Arms trading, part of Ukroboronprom	S	A
Ukrtatnafta	Oil & gas	Exploration & production	Kremenchuk	1995	Refiners	P	A
Ukrtelecom	Telecommunications	Mobile telecommunications	Kyiv	1991	Telephone, ISP	P	A
Vodafone Ukraine	Telecommunications	Mobile telecommunications	Kyiv	1992	Subsidiary of Vodafone	P	A
WOG	Oil & Gas, Consumer services	Oil Equipment & Services, Food retailers	Lutsk	2000	Food and gas retail	P	A
XADO	Basic materials	Speciality chemicals	Kharkiv	1991	Consumer goods, industrial goods	P	A
Yarych Confectionery	Consumer goods	Food products	Staryi Yarychiv	1986	Confectionery	P	A
Yuzhmash	Industrials	Aerospace	Dnipro	1944	State-owned spacecraft and aerospace	S	A
Zaporizhzhia Foundry and Mechanical Plant	Basic materials	Iron & steel	Zaporizhzhia	2016	Steel	P	A
Zaporizhstal	Basic materials	Iron & steel	Zaporizhzhia	1931	Steel	P	A
ZAZ	Consumer goods	Automobiles & parts	Zaporizhzhia	1923	Subsidiary of Ukrainian Automobile Corporation	P	A

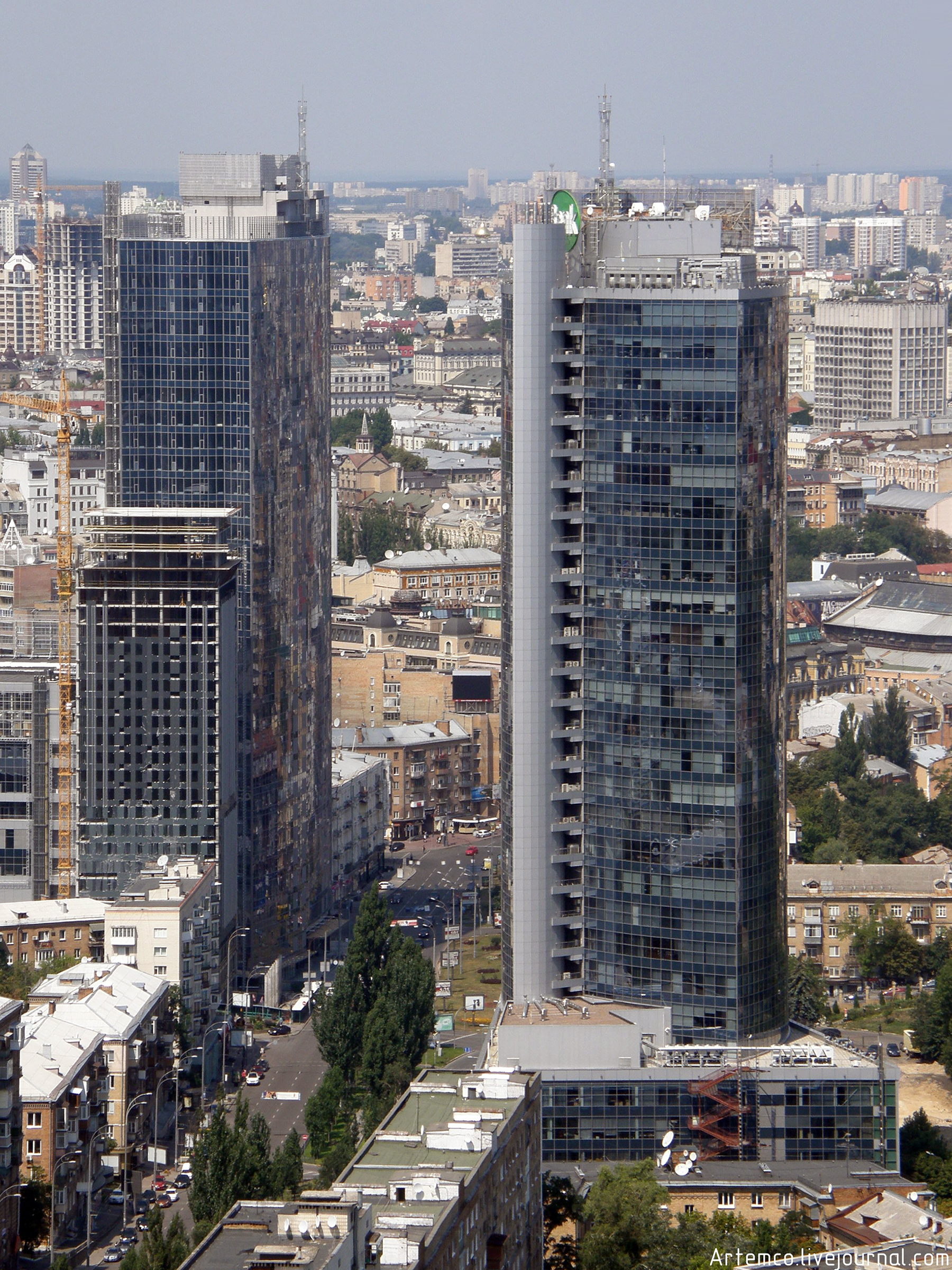
Business centers in Kyiv

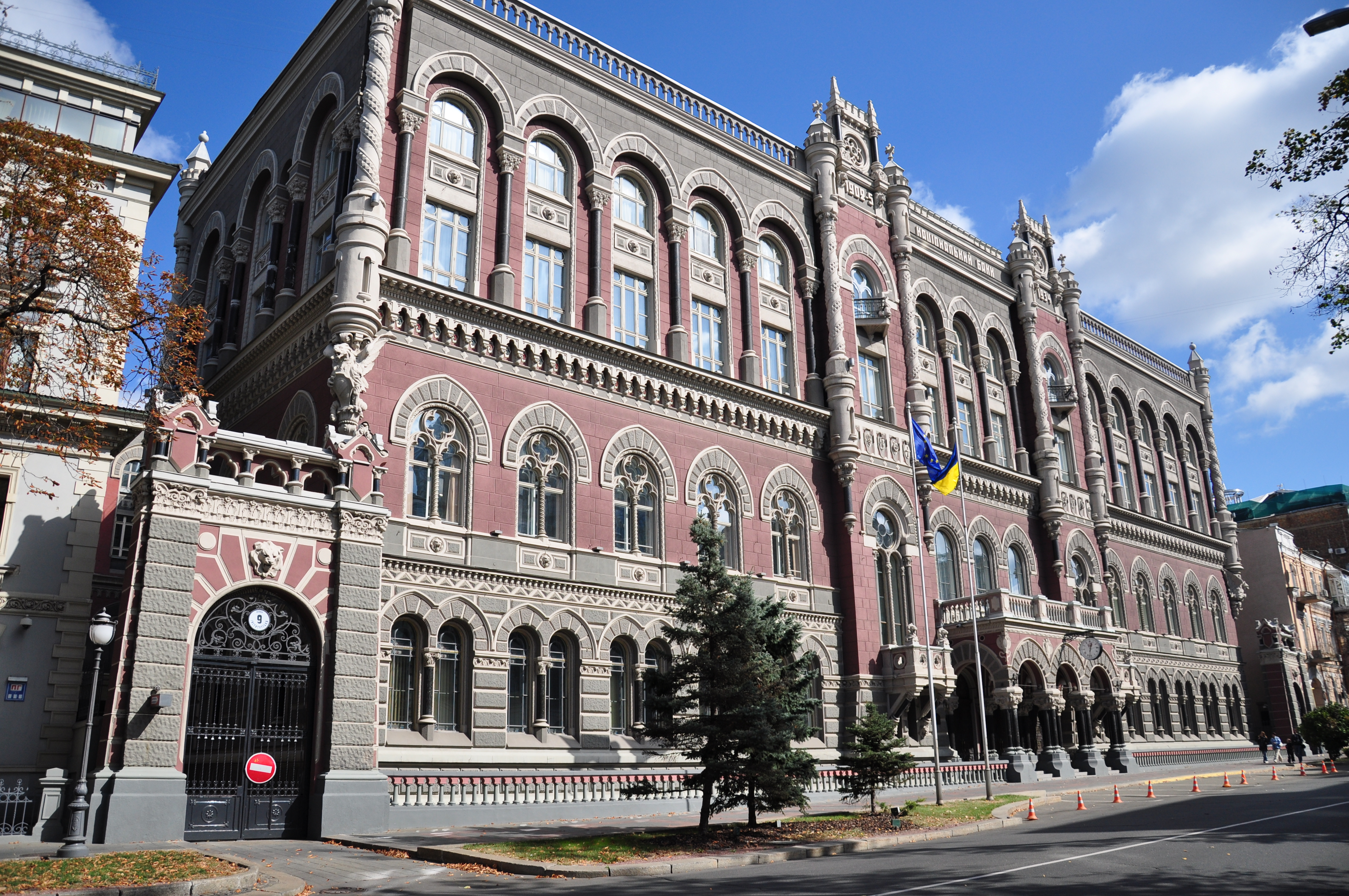
National Bank of Ukraine

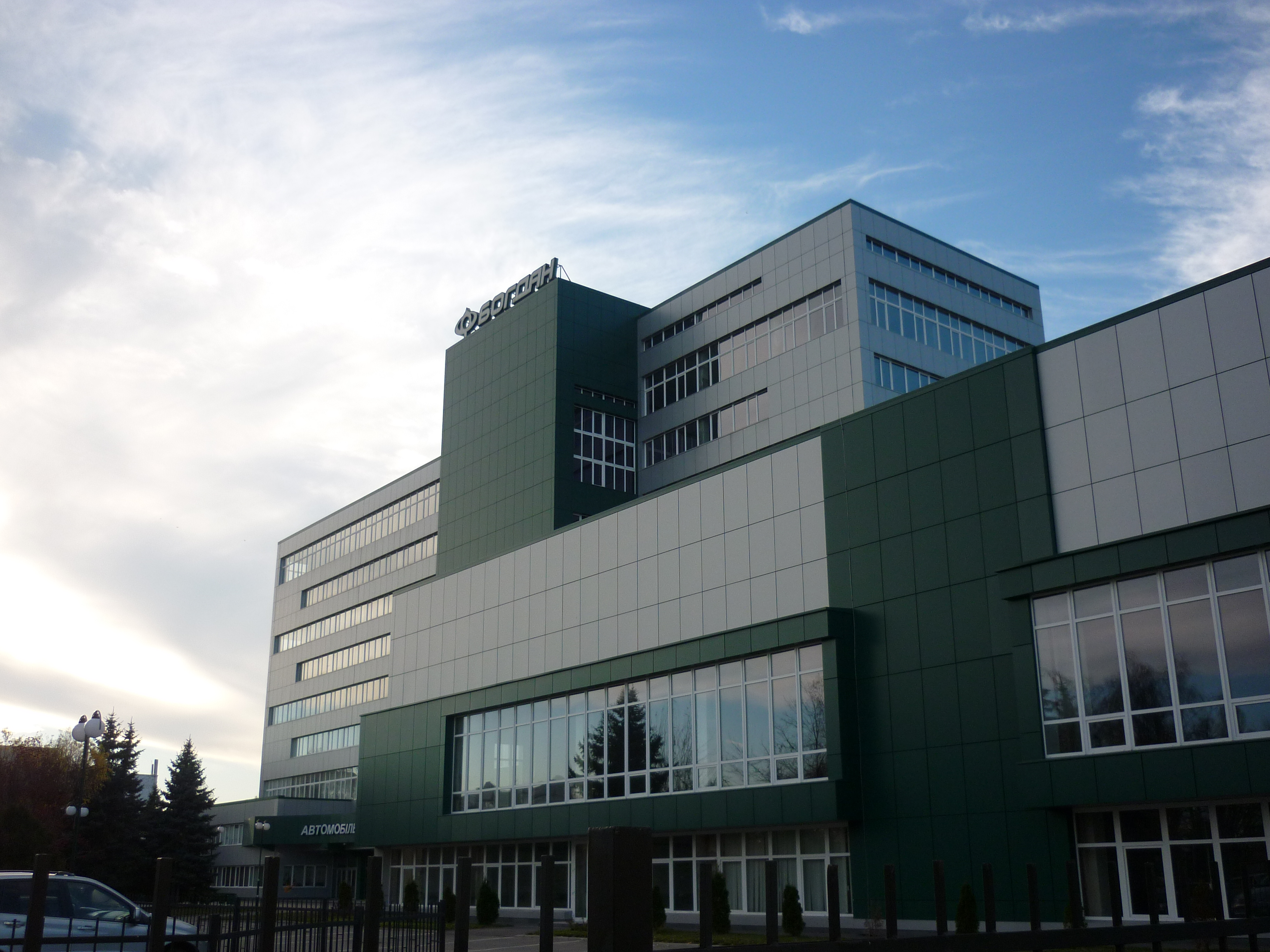
Bogdan factory in Cherkasy

== See also ==
- Economy of Ukraine
- PFTS index
