= Ukrainsky (disambiguation) =

Ukrainsky is a rural locality in Aleksandrovsky Selsoviet, Suyetsky District, Altai Krai, Russia.

Ukrainsky may also refer to:

- Ukrainsky, Volgograd Oblast, Russia
- Ukrainsky, Voronezh Oblast, Russia

== See also ==
- Ukrainskiy (disambiguation)
- Ukrainskoye
