= Ukrainskiy =

Ukrainskiy may refer to:

- Ukrainian people
- Ukrainian language
- Ukrainskiye Otruba (Əbil), Azerbaijan
- Ukrainskiy Retail, a retail chain in Ukraine

== See also ==
- Ukrainsky (disambiguation)
- Ukrainskoye
