= Znak =

Znak may refer to:

- Znak (association), Polish lay Catholics, active between 1956 and 1976
- Znak (publisher), Polish company founded in 1959
- Znak (company), Ukrainian plastics manufacturer founded in 2004
- Two letters (signs) in the Cyrillic alphabet, Hard sign and Soft sign
- Znak.com, a former Russian news site
- "Znak", a 2013 song by Ewa Farna

== People ==
- Marina Znak (born 1961), Belarusian rower
- Maxim Znak (born 1981), Belarusian activist and lawyer, member of the Coordination Council
