= Asuka (name) =

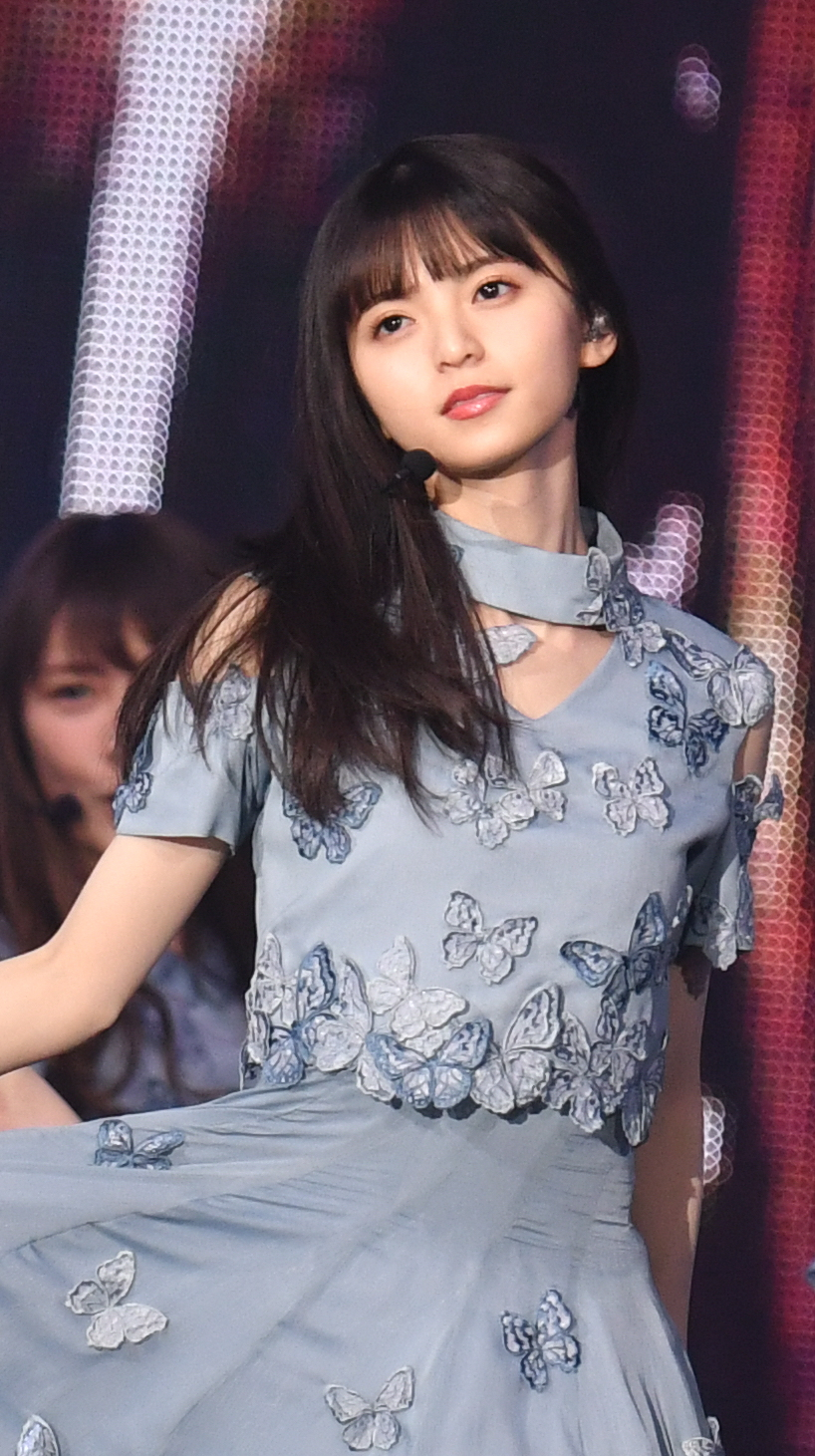
- Asuka Saito, Japanese actress, fashion model, and television personality
- Pronunciation: [aꜜsɯ̥ka]
- Gender: Unisex, predominantly female

Origin
- Origin: Japanese
- Meaning: Different meanings depending on the kanji used
- Region of origin: Japan

Other names
- Alternative spelling: Aska
- Related names: Asaka

Asuka is both a unisex Japanese given name and a Japanese surname.

== Written forms ==
Asuka can be written using different combinations of kanji characters. Here are some examples:

- 飛鳥, "fly, bird"
- 明日香, "tomorrow, fragrant"
- 明日花, "tomorrow, flower"
- 明日華, "tomorrow, flower/splendor"
- 亜寿花, "Asia, long life, flower"

The name can also be written in hiragana あすか or katakana アスカ.

== Notable people with the given name Asuka ==
- Asuka (wrestler) (アスカ; born 1981), Japanese professional wrestler
- Asuka (wrestler, born 1998), a Japanese professional wrestler also known as Veny outside of Japan
- Princess Asuka (明日香皇女), Japanese princess during the Asuka Period
- Asuka Cambridge (ケンブリッジ 飛鳥; born 1993), Japanese-Jamaican male track and field sprinter
- Asuka Fujita (藤田 明日香; born 1996), Japanese handball player
- Asuka Fukuda (福田 明日香; born 1984), Japanese pop singer
- Asuka Hachisuka (蜂須賀 明香; born 1992), Japanese biathlete
- Asuca Hayashi (林 明日香; born 1989), Japanese singer
- Asuka Hinoi (樋井 明日香; born 1991), a Japanese singer who is the leader of the Hinoi Team (named after her)
- Asuka Hisa, Los Angeles-based artist, educator and curator
- Asuka Kanai (金井 亜翠香; born 2001), Japanese curler
- Asuka Katsura (桂 明日香), author of Le Portrait de Petit Cossette manga
- Asuka Kawazu (川津 明日香; born 2002), Japanese actress, fashion model and gravure idol
- Asuka Kijima (貴島 明日香; born 1996), Japanese fashion model, entertainer
- Asuka Kudo (工藤 阿須加; born 1991), Japanese actor
- Asuka Kuge (公家 明日香; born 1994), Japanese rugby union player
- Asuka Kuramochi (倉持 明日香; born 1989), (明日香), a Japanese idol
- Asuka Kurosawa (黒沢 あすか; born 1971), Japanese actress and gravure model
- Asuka Nakase (中世 明日香; born 1980), Japanese voice actress
- Asuka Nishi (西 明日香; born 1988), Japanese voice actress
- Asuka Nomura (野村 明日香; born 1994), Japanese volleyball player
- Asuka Oda (小田 飛鳥; born 1990), Japanese actress, gravure idol, and tarento
- Asuka Ōgame (大亀 あすか; born 1987), Japanese voice actress
- Asuka Ōkura (大倉 明日香; born 1996), known as Asca, Japanese singer and musician
- Asuka Saitō (齋藤 飛鳥; born 1998), Japanese idol, singer, actress and fashion model
- Asuka Sakai, video game musicians notable for Katamari Damacy and Soulcalibur II
- Asuka Sezaki (瀬﨑 明日香; born 1977), Japanese classical violinist
- Asuka Takahashi (髙橋 明日香; born 1999), Japanese badminton player
- Asuka Tanii (谷井 あすか; born 1980), Japanese voice actress
- Asuka Tasaki (田崎 明日花; born 1997), Japanese competitor in synchronized swimming
- Asuka Terada (寺田 明日香; born 1990), Japanese hurdler
- Asuka Teramoto (寺本 明日香; born 1995), Japanese gymnast
- Asuka Tono (遠野 あすか; born 1978), Japanese actress

== Notable people with the surname Asuka ==
- Aska (singer-songwriter), Ryo Asuka (飛鳥 涼, born 1958), a Japanese singer-songwriter, formerly a member of Chage and Aska
- Rin Asuka (飛鳥 凛; born 1991), a Japanese actress
- Kirara Asuka (明日花 キララ; born 1988), a Japanese model and former adult video actress

== Fictional characters ==
=== With the given name Asuka ===
- Asuka (アスカ), a character from Bakuryū Sentai Abaranger
- Asuka (飛鳥), a shikigami who serves the priestess Kikyo in the InuYasha series
- Asuka (明日架), in Log Horizon
- Asuka (飛鳥), in the Senran Kagura series
- Asuka (アスカ) in the game Sweet Home
- Asuka Connell (アスカ・コネル), the daughter of Bisca and Alzack Connell in Fairy Tail
- Asuka Domon (土門 飛鳥), a character in the manga series Inazuma Eleven
- Asuka Hirama (平間 あすか), a minor character in Haikyū!!
- Asuka Honda (本田 飛鳥) in Asuka 120%
- Asuka Kasen in Grand Theft Auto III
- Asuka Kazama (風間 飛鳥) in Tekken series.
- Asuka Kojo (古城 アスカ), a supporting character in Little Battlers Experience W
- Asuka Kudō, a character from Problem Children Are Coming from Another World, Aren't They?
- Asuka Langley Soryu (惣流 アスカ・ラングレー) in Neon Genesis Evangelion
- Asuka Mizunokoji (水乃小路 飛鳥) in Urusei Yatsura
- Asuka Motomura (本村 明日香) in Battle Royale II
- Asuka Murase (村瀬 明日香), a former girlfriend of Yoji's in Weiss Kreuz
- Asuka Ootorii (大鳥居 あすか) in Magical Girl Spec-Ops Asuka
- Asuka R. Kreutz (飛鳥・R・クロイツ) in the Guilty Gear series
- Asuka Saginomiya ((鷺ノ宮 飛鳥) in Ranma ½
- Asuka Shin (アスカ・シン), Dyna's human form in the Ultra Series Ultraman Dyna
- Asuka Sugo (菅生 あすか) in Cyberformula
- Asuka Tachibana (橘 あすか) in the anime s-CRY-ed
- Asuka Takizawa (滝沢あすか, also known as Cure Flamingo), a main character in the 2021 anime series Tropical-Rouge! Pretty Cure
- Asuka Tanaka (田中 あすか), a character in the novel series Sound! Euphonium
- Asuka Toyama (戸山 明日香), in the anime BanG Dream!
- Asuka Tenjouin (天上院 明日香), the main female character from Yu-Gi-Oh! GX
- Asuka Kurashina (倉科 明日香), one of the main heroines from the visual novel, Ao no Kanata no Four Rhythm

=== With the surname Asuka ===
- Jun Asuka from Iron Virgin Jun
- Daiki Asuka (飛鳥 大貴) or Asuka Jr. (アスカ Jr.), in Saint Tail
- Kenji Asuka (明日香 健二) or Midoranger, in Himitsu Sentai Goranger
- Momoko Asuka (飛鳥 ももこ) in Ojamajo Doremi
  - Kenzo Asuka (飛鳥健三), her father
  - Minori Asuka (飛鳥みのり), her mother
- Ryo Asuka (飛鳥 了) in Devilman
- Ryu Asuka (飛鳥 竜) or Yarinin Toppa (槍忍 突破) from Sekai Ninja Sen Jiraiya
- Shin Asuka (シン・アスカ) in Mobile Suit Gundam SEED Destiny
- Torajirou Asuka (飛鳥 虎次郎), a character from Digimon Universe: App Monsters

== Others ==
- Asuka-Fujiwara, a cluster of archaeological sites
