= HISA =

HISA may refer to:

- Health Informatics Service Architecture, a European Committee of Standardization protocol on IT in healthcare
- Horseracing Integrity and Safety Authority, a self-regulatory horse racing governance body in the United States

== See also ==
- Hisa (disambiguation)
