= Asuka =

Asuka may refer to:

== People ==
- Asuka (name), a list of people
- Asuka (wrestler) (born 1981), professional wrestler

== Places ==
=== In Japan ===
- Asuka, Yamato (飛鳥), an area in Yamato Province (now Nara Prefecture) in Japan, where imperial palaces and centers of government were built in the 6th and 7th centuries
- Asuka, Nara (明日香), a village in Nara Prefecture in Japan, in the same area as ancient Asuka (飛鳥)
  - Asuka-dera (飛鳥寺), also known as Hōkō-ji (法興寺), a Buddhist temple in Asuka, Nara
- Asukayama Park (飛鳥山公園), a park in Kita, Tokyo, Japan

=== Outside of Japan ===
- Asuka, Estonia, a village in Saaremaa Parish, Saare County, Estonia
- Asuka Station (Antarctica)

== Ships ==
- MS Asuka (now MS Amadea), a cruise ship operated by Nippon Yusen Kaisha from 1991 to 2006
- MS Asuka II, a cruise ship operated by Nippon Yusen Kaisha from 2006 onwards
- MS Asuka III, a newbuilt under construction, planned for 2025
- JS Asuka, an experimental ship of the Japan Maritime Self-Defense Force commissioned in 1995

== Popular media ==
- Asuka (album), by the traditional/pop-rock group Rin'
- Asuka (magazine), a Japanese shōjo manga magazine published by Kadokawa

=== Fictional entities ===
- Asuka Clan, a group of ninja in the Shinobido video game series

== Other uses ==
- Asuka period (飛鳥時代), a Japanese era from 538 to 710 AD
- ASTRO-D/ASCA (Asuka), satellite launched on 20 February 1993
- Asuka, a subsidiary of the French manga publisher Kazé

== See also ==
- Aska (disambiguation)
- Capital of Japan
