= Aska =

Aska may refer to:

== Locations ==
- Aska, Georgia, a community in the United States
- Aska Hundred, or Aska härad, a former administrative division of Östergötland, Sweden
- Asika, a town in Odisha, India, also known as Aska
- Askas, a village in Cyprus
- Aska (restaurant), a two-Michelin Star restaurant in New York City

== Music ==
- ASKA (band), an American heavy-metal band
- Aska (singer) (born 1958), Japanese singer-songwriter
- Aska (group), a Yugoslavian pop group
- Aska Yang (born 1978), Taiwanese Mandopop singer
- Aska (2025), an album by Tea Tairović

== Sports ==
- Aska Cambridge (born 1993), Japanese sprint athlete
- Joe Aska (born 1972), American football player
- Ivan Aska (born 1990), American basketball player in the Israeli National League

== Fiction ==
- Aska, a female ninja from Takara's Cy Girls
- Aska, a sheep from the 1968 short story "Aska and the Wolf" by Ivo Andrić
- Aska (TMNT), a female fighter from the Super Nintendo Entertainment System video game Teenage Mutant Ninja Turtles: Tournament Fighters

== Other uses ==
- Aska (Lok Sabha constituency)
- Aska (Odisha Vidhan Sabha constituency)
- ASKA Insurance Company
- Aska (restaurant), a Michelin-starred Scandinavian restaurant in Brooklyn, New York
- Isuzu Aska, a Japanese car

== See also ==
- Asika, a city in Odisha, India
- Asuka (disambiguation)
