= Svitoch =

Ukrainian confectionery company

- Native name: Світоч
- Type: Subsidiary
- Industry: Confectionery
- Founded: 1962; 64 years ago in Lviv, Ukrainian SSR
- Headquarters: Lviv, Ukraine
- Key people: Yaroslav Huzei (general manager)
- Parent: Nestlé
- Website: nestle.ua/brands/svitoch

Svitoch (Ukrainian: Світоч) is a Lviv-based Ukrainian confectionery manufacturer. It is owned by Nestlé since 1998. The company produces chocolate, chocolate candy, lollipops and many other types of candy.

== History ==
The confectionery was established as Svitoch in 1962 through the merging of various confectionaries, although it traces its history under other names to 1882. The original sweet shop from 1882 was operated by M. Brandstadter, also known as Branka, in Lviv. After operating under the brand name "Hazet" for candy and chocolates, in 1924 K. Avdykovych-Glynska and Andrei Sheptytsky also founded "Fortuna Nova", a sweets factory for Galicia. Following the start of Soviet rule in western Ukraine, the candy enterprises in the area were nationalised and reorganised to make the Kirov Factory and the "Bolshevik" Factory. Kirov was intended for chocolates, candies, and wafers, while Bolshevik was for caramels and flour-based confectionery. It wasn't until 1962 when the Lviv Council of National Economy merged Kirov, Bolshevik, Fortuna Nova, and the confectionery factory in Chortkiv that Svitoch was formally created, initially under the name "Chervona Troianda" (Red Rose) before it was renamed that same year.

In 1969, a new production building was opened for caramel and chocolate production. By 1971, the factory was supplying its products to Poland, Czechoslovakia, Bulgaria, West and East Germany, and France. In 1985, it was decided to break off the production of biscuits and crackers from Svitoch to a separate enterprise in Staryi Yarychiv, which is now known as the Yarych Confectionery. In the Soviet era, Svitoch was considered one of the best manufacturers, along with the Rot Front and Babaevsky chocolate factories.

By the mid-1990s, Svitoch was one of the most powerful enterprises in the confectionery industry in Ukraine following the collapse of the Soviet Union. In the year 1997, it was producing 11,400 tonnes of biscuits, 10,200 tonnes of chocolate candies, and 7,000 tonnes of caramels, among other products. In 1998, the company was acquired by the Swiss company Nestlé, which acquired a controlling stake in the enterprise. It was the first of three Ukrainian confectionery brands bought by Nestlé, and it was bought alongside Yarych. Over the first decade of ownership, there was the construction of a distribution centre for the company worth $8 million in Malehiv, new laboratories, and a new production line. The 2009 economic crisis led to a significant reduction in output, though by January 2010 the output did increase. That same year, it was decided that Nescafé's "3 in 1" coffee stick production line was to be commissioned at the Svitoch factory in Lviv, which was transferred over from China for 3 million Swiss francs. This marked a transition towards being a regional Nestlé hub, as they produced all the factory packaging for Nescafé at the factory and were also the main producers for Nestlé chocolate bars in nearby Hungary. In 2009, Sivtoch decided to change its packaging and also introduce a new range for premium products. They later redesigned again in 2014 to mark the founding of the company. In 2014, they were also the first sponsor of X-Factor Ukraine, and their brand recognition in Ukraine stood at 60%.

In 2013, Nestlé invested $4.4 million in modernising the Svitoch factory. The previous year, they sold 850 million hryvnias in products. At the beginning of 2015, the company operated production lines for waffles, chocolate bars, and candies, including automated processes for the preparation of chocolate masses. In 2016, approximately 150 million hryvnias were invested in production. Since 2018, Nestlé owns 100% of the company's shares.

== Products ==
Svitoch produces over 110 types of productions, and holds second place overall in the Ukrainian confectionary market, behind Roshen but has a market share in wafers. The most popular product remains in Artec wafers, dating back to the 1950s, with 10 tonnes being produced per shift. Other products include Romashka candies, Stozhary, Zoriane Siaivo, which are dome-shaped, and Chervonyi Mak chocolates. Svitoch rebranded Strela candy (Ukrainian: Стріла - Arrow) as Stozhary (Ukrainian: Стожари - Pleiades) but had little success. Primarily in recent years the product line has only focused on the Ukrainian domestic market, except for Moldova for which it is a Nestle main regional supplier. It still exports Nesquik candies to Poland and the Baltics and Lion bars to Brazil.

== See also ==
- Roshen
- Konti Group
