= Kyiv cake =

Dessert cake brand

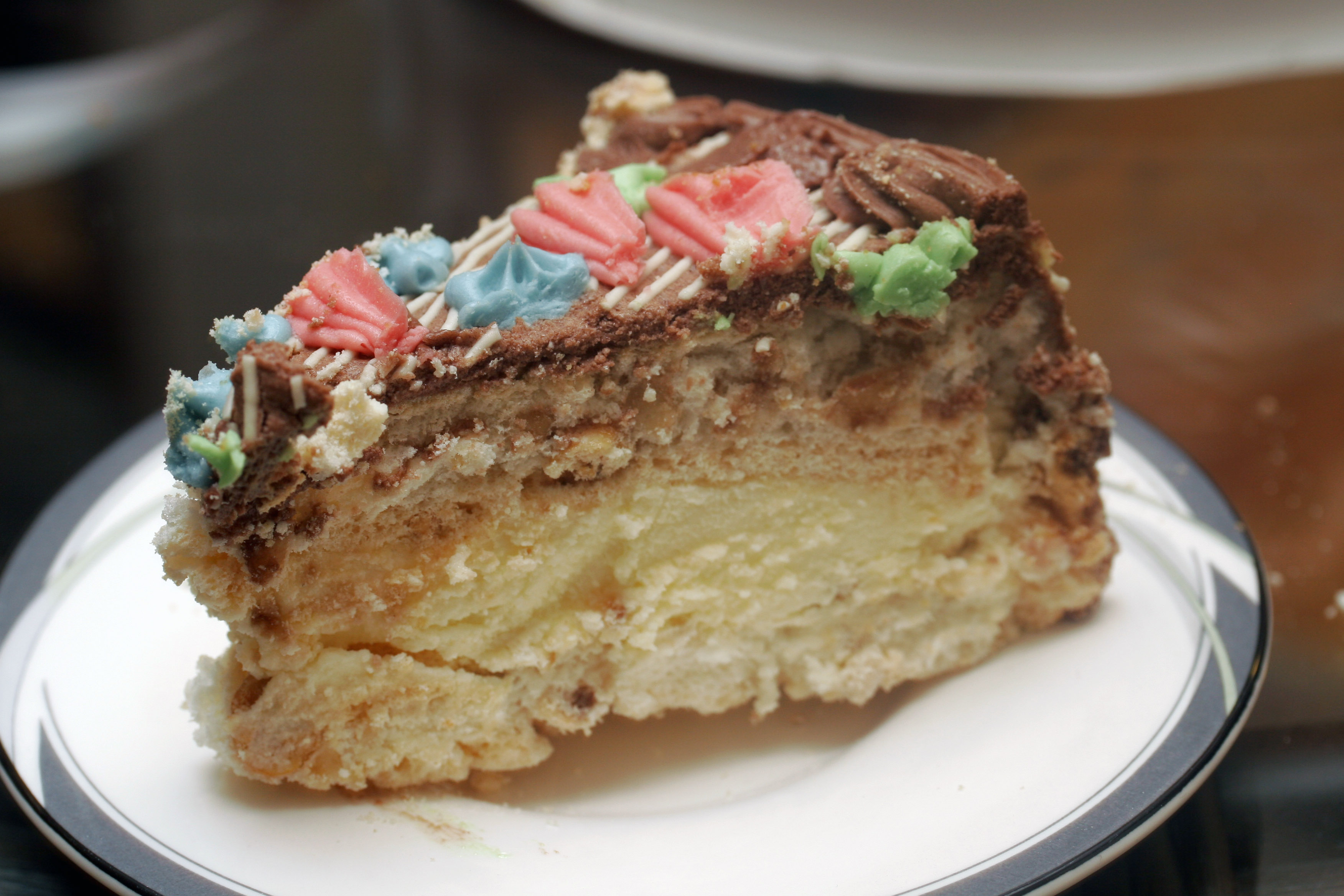
- Kyiv cake slice
- Course: Dessert
- Place of origin: Ukraine
- Region or state: Kyiv
- Created by: Karl Marx Confectionery Factory
- Main ingredients: Meringue, hazelnuts, chocolate
- Food energy (per serving): (per 100 grams) 481

The Kyiv cake (Ukrainian: торт «Київський», romanized: tort "Kyivskyi" [tɔrt ˈkɪjiu̯sʲkɪj]) is a dessert cake produced in Kyiv, Ukraine since 6 December 1956 by the Karl Marx Confectionery Factory, now a subsidiary of the Roshen Confectionery Corporation.

The cake has emerged as a symbol of Kyiv, largely due to its brand name and packaging featuring the depiction of a horse chestnut leaf, which was present on the Coat of Arms of Kyiv during the Soviet era.

The cake consists of two light layers of meringue with hazelnuts covered in a chocolate glaze, and filled with a buttercream-like filling.

== History ==
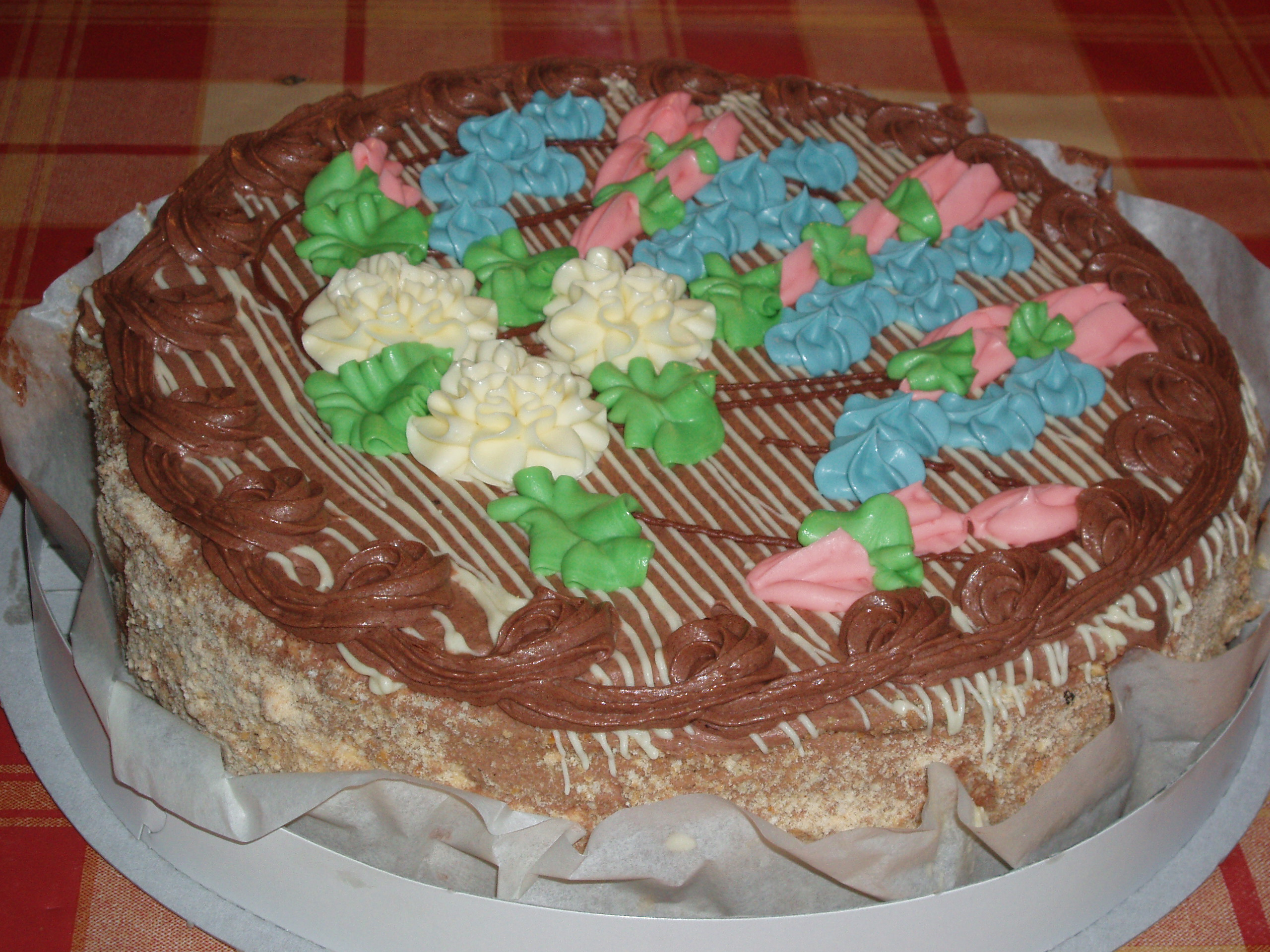
Opened cake, close-up

Three accounts describe how the Kyiv cake originated in 1956.

One says that confectioners forgot to refrigerate meringue overnight for biscuits. The next morning, chef Kostiantyn Petrenko and his 17-year-old assistant, Nadiia Chornohor, salvaged the mistake and created what became Kyiv cake.

The second story also features Nadiia Chornohor. In this account, she went from failing her medical school exams to decorating cakes to becoming a confectioner and inventing the cake.

The third tale focuses on Kostiantyn Petrenko and is the version the factory stands behind: At the time the recipe was developed, the Soviet Union actively supported India, which paid with goods. When the USSR received a large shipment of cashews from India in 1956, confectioners were tasked with creating a dessert using them. Petrenko, the story says, developed the cake at the Karl Marx Confectionery Factory after years of experimentation with earlier recipes.

Marina Shiyan, a spokeswoman for Roshen has said, "Many people believe that there was some mistake, but that’s nothing but a city legend. It took long and purposeful work to invent a new cake recipe".

The recipe has changed with time. In the 1970s, bakers perfected the process of making the egg-white and nut mixture. They then started to add hazelnuts, and began experimenting with adding peanuts and cashews; however, these nuts were expensive and increased costs, so the factory returned to using hazelnuts.

=== Intellectual property ===
Although Petrenko is credited with creating the recipe, Galina Fastovets-Kalinovskaya and Anna Kurilo received a 1973 patent recognizing their role in refining and popularizing it.

In 2017, "Kyiv Cake" was officially recognized as a trademark in Ukraine, linked to the Roshen Kyiv Confectionery Factory. The decision was based on decades of widespread use, strong consumer recognition, and extensive production and sales dating back to 1956.

== See also ==
- Dacquoise
- Pavlova
- Sans rival
- Spanische Windtorte
