= Strela candy =

Ukrainian chocolate candy with brandy-flavored filling

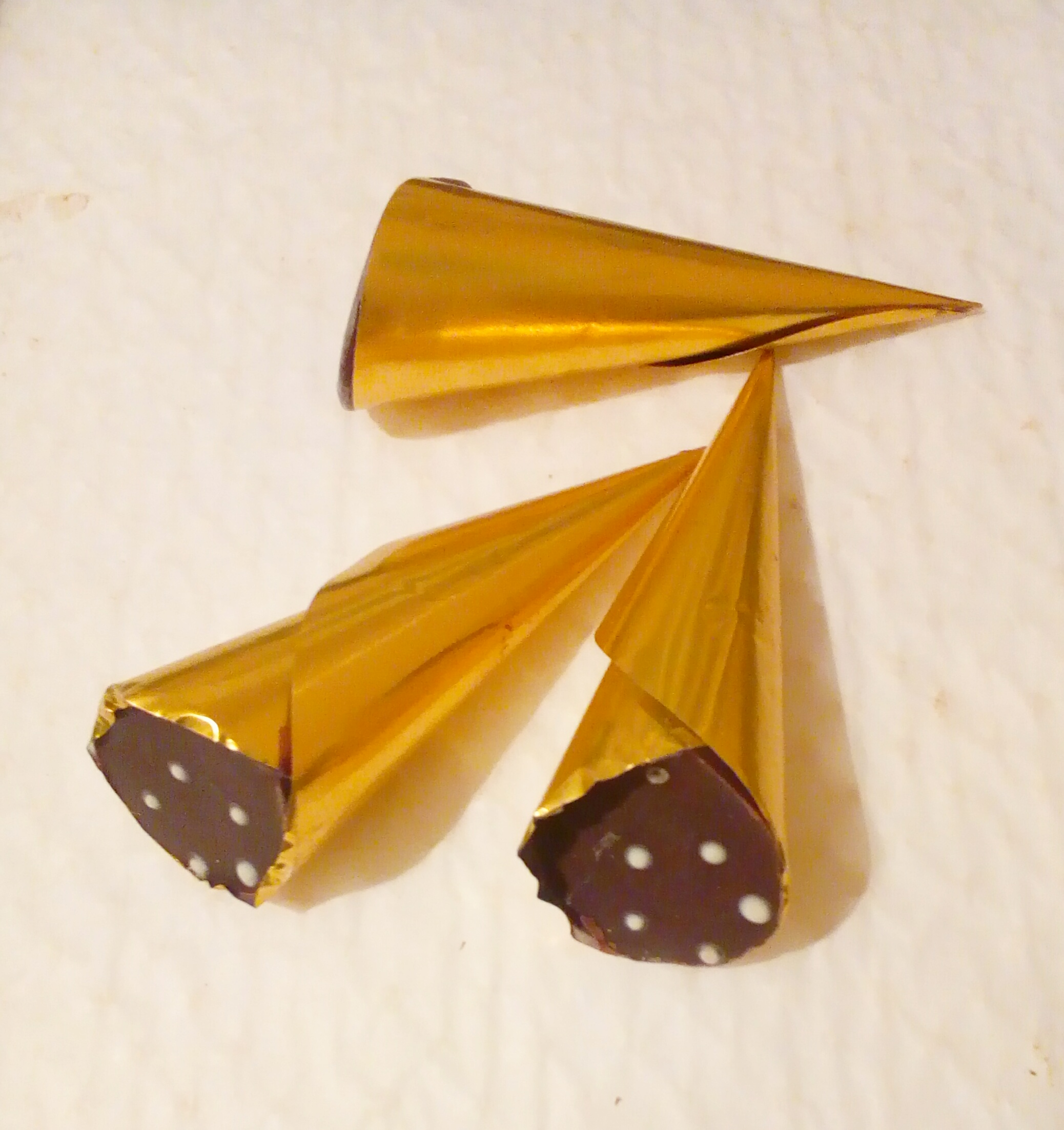
- Type: Confectionery
- Place of origin: Commonwealth of Independent States

Strela or strila (Russian: Стрела, Ukrainian: Стріла - arrow) is a popular type of candy sold in Ukraine and in the Commonwealth of Independent States (CIS). The recipe was developed in Odesa during the Soviet times. It gets its name from its distinctive foiled cone shape which resembles an arrowhead.

== Form ==
Strela has a very distinctive shape, taste and structure. The base is a metal cone made from a round piece of foil, sprinkled with a thin layer of chocolate. The candy is filled with a brandy-flavoured cream filling (although some manufacturers use fruit flavourings), which is extremely soft at room temperature. The wide end is sealed with a thick piece of chocolate and the confection is decorated according to the manufacturer's taste.

The foil cone is the distinguishing feature of this type of candy. It allows for ease of manufacture and safe storage and transportation of an otherwise too-soft candy body. Before eating, the candy is chilled so that the thin chocolate layer does not melt and become sticky. 20 °C is sufficient, but some people prefer a temperature of around 0 so that the candy will slowly melt in the mouth. The candy is held by the thick cone cap (which is deliberately left outside the foil cone and thick enough to hold) and the foil is gently unrolled immediately before consumption.

Because of their delicious taste, exquisite look and quality, this type of candy has a steady consumer base in the CIS, but the relatively high price (~30 US cents per piece) and small amount of chocolate restricts it from more widespread popularity.

== Manufacturers ==
The invention of the Strila candy is a rare case where the packaging appeared before the product. Grigory Lvovich Makhlis, a mechanic at the Odessa Rosa Luxemburg Confectionery Factory (formerly the Krahhmalnikov Factory), invented a mechanism for rolling foil circles into cones.

Subsequently, production technologists developed a new candy that could be packaged in these cones.

Since the trademark belonged to the former USSR and the candy was produced in more than one factory, the name is permitted for use by any manufacturer as long as the product satisfies certain technical requirements. Modern Ukrainian manufacturers developed Strila varieties of their own: Nestle-owned Svitoch has re-branded the product as Stozhary (Ukrainian: Стожари Pleiades), there are also Podilska Strila (Strila of Podillia) by Roshen, Strila Dniprovska (Strila of Dnipro) by Stymul and some others.
