= Interpol Travel Document =

Travel document issued to Interpol officers

Interpol e-Passport Booklet
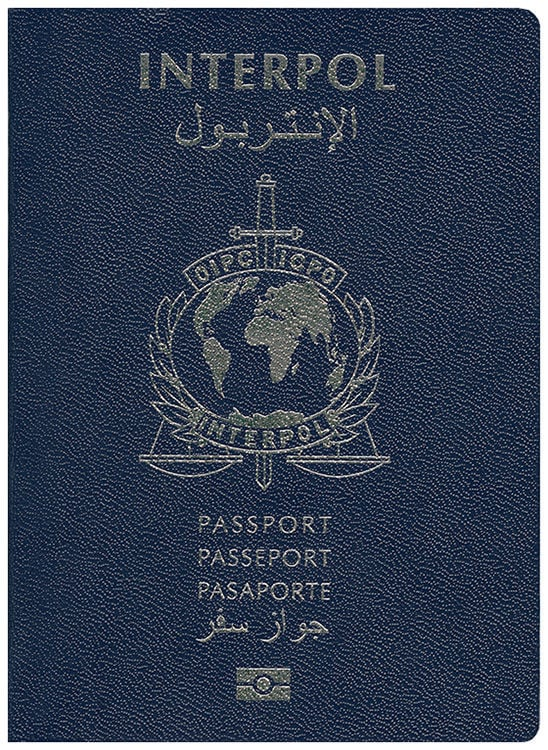

- The biographical data page inside the prototype Interpol e-Passport Booklet
- Type: Passport
- Issued by: Interpol
- First issued: 13 October 2009
- Purpose: Identification
- Valid in: Interpol member countries
- Eligibility: Interpol officers travelling on official duty

Interpol e-Identification Card
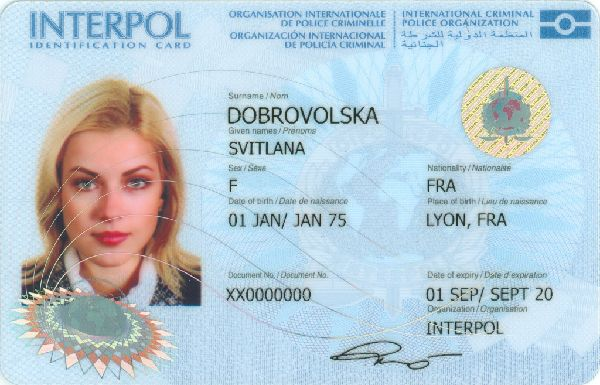
- The front of an Interpol e-Identification Card

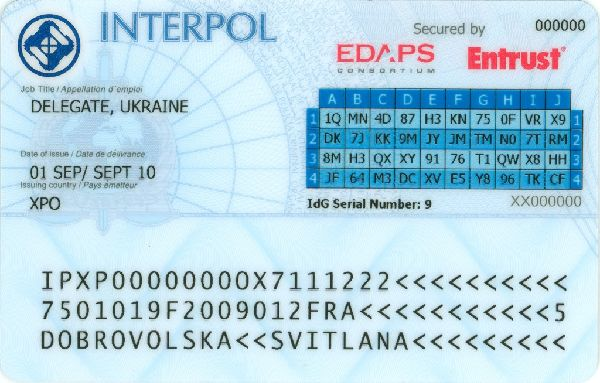
- The reverse of an Interpol e-Identification Card
- Type: Identity Card
- Issued by: Interpol
- First issued: 7 November 2010
- Purpose: Identification
- Valid in: Interpol member countries
- Eligibility: Interpol officers travelling on official duty

An Interpol Travel Document is a travel document issued to Interpol officers for travel to Interpol member countries. They are intended to reduce response times for personnel deployed to assist with transnational criminal investigations, major events or emergency situations by waiving normal visa requirements.

The travel documents consist of an e-Passport Booklet and an e-Identification Card identifying the holder as an Interpol officer, granting them special immigration status when travelling on official Interpol duties to participating member countries.

The Interpol Travel Document initiative proposal was approved by Interpol's Executive Committee in March 2009 and was unanimously ratified by Interpol member countries at the 79th Interpol General Assembly in Doha in November 2010.

== Physical appearance ==
The e-Passport Booklet contains 34 visa pages and a polycarbonate machine readable bio-data page. The cover is black with silver embossing on the front. The word "INTERPOL" in both Latin (INTERPOL) and Arabic (الإنتربول) script appears at the top, with the Interpol logo below. The word for 'Passport' then follows in all four official Interpol languages: English (PASSPORT), French (PASSEPORT), Spanish (PASAPORTE), and Arabic (جواز السفر). The biometric passport symbol appears at the bottom of the cover. The bio-data page features the holder's name, date and place of birth, photograph and signature, their job title, the passport number, the issuer code "XPO", and its issue and expiry dates. A machine readable strip runs along the bottom of the page.

The e-Identification Card is a light blue polycarbonate smartcard. The front features the Interpol logo overlaid with the holder's biographical data, photograph and signature, the document number and its expiry date. The reverse features the officer's job title, the card's issue date, the issuer code "XPO", and a machine readable strip.

== Technical features ==
The Interpol travel documents were developed by the EDAPS Consortium and Entrust, Inc. The passport contains 29 security features including laser engraving and an electronic RFID chip storing the holder's biometric data, as well as holographic, micrographic, and optical security elements. Both travel documents meet the relevant ICAO/ISO standards and have been allocated the three-letter country code 'XPO'. The passports are produced in Kyiv by EDAPS and can be printed and dispatched in less than two hours after an individual's personal data has been received.

== International recognition ==
Each participating member country decides whether to recognise either the e-Passport Booklet and/or the e-Identification Card and whether they need be used in conjunction with or without a valid national passport. The holder is then granted visa exemption, expedited visa processing or some other special visa treatment depending on the individual arrangement.

It was anticipated by Interpol that 100 members would have recognised the documents in time for Interpol's 83rd General Assembly in Monaco in November 2014, which marked the 100th anniversary of the first International Criminal Police Congress. This was achieved by the conclusion of the 83rd General Assembly.

As of December 2024, the travel documents are accepted in either, or both its forms (e-Passport Booklet and/or e-Identification Card), sometimes to be used in conjunction with a valid national passport, by 109 of Interpol's 192 member countries.

- Afghanistan
- Albania
- Algeria
- Andorra
- Angola
- Argentina
- Armenia
- Austria
- Bangladesh
- Belarus
- Benin
- Botswana
- Brazil
- Bulgaria
- Burkina Faso
- Burundi
- Cambodia
- Cameroon
- Canada
- Cape Verde
- Central African Republic
- Chad
- Colombia
- Comoros
- Congo
- Costa Rica
- Côte d’Ivoire
- Curaçao
- Djibouti
- Dominican Republic
- DR Congo
- Egypt
- Equatorial Guinea
- Ethiopia
- Fiji
- France
- Gabon
- Gambia
- Georgia
- Ghana
- Grenada
- Guinea
- Guinea Bissau
- Guyana
- Iraq
- Ireland
- Italy
- Jamaica
- Japan
- Jordan
- Kenya
- Kuwait
- Laos
- Lebanon
- Lesotho
- Liberia
- Libya
- North Macedonia
- Madagascar
- Malawi
- Malaysia
- Maldives
- Mali
- Marshall Islands
- Mauritania
- Mauritius
- Moldova
- Monaco
- Mongolia
- Montenegro
- Mozambique
- Myanmar
- Namibia
- Nepal
- Niger
- Nigeria
- Pakistan
- Panama
- Papua New Guinea
- Philippines
- Qatar
- Rwanda
- Saint Kitts and Nevis
- San Marino
- Sao Tome and Principe
- Senegal
- Seychelles
- Sierra Leone
- Singapore
- Sint Maarten
- Slovakia
- Slovenia
- Somalia
- South Africa
- South Sudan
- Sri Lanka
- Sudan
- Suriname
- Swaziland
- Tanzania
- Timor-Leste
- Turkey
- Togo
- Uganda
- United Kingdom
- United States of America
- Uruguay
- Venezuela
- Zimbabwe

== See also ==
- United Nations laissez-passer
