= Hisa =

Hisa may refer to:

== People with the given name ==
- Hisa Ōta (大田 ひさ, 1868–1945), Japanese actress
- Hisa Sasagi (born 1987), Samoan rugby union player
- Hisa Sawada (沢田 ひさ, 1897 – 1979), Japanese suffragist and politician
- Hisa Yoneyama (米山 久子, 1897 – 1981), Japanese poet, activist and politician
- Hisa Nagano (1865 - 1901) Japanese nurse

== People with the surname ==
- Takuma Hisa (久 琢磨, c. 1895 – 1980), Japanese aikidoka
- Asuka Hisa, Los Angeles-based artist, educator and curator.

== Other uses ==
- Hisa, a fictional alien species in C. J. Cherryh's Alliance–Union universe

== See also ==
- Sachiko, Princess Hisa (1927–1928), Japanese princess
- Health Informatics Service Architecture
