= EDAPS =

- Formation: 2004; 22 years ago
- Dissolved: 2016; 10 years ago
- Type: Consortium
- Purpose: Production of IDs, information systems and security printing.
- Location: Ukraine: Kyiv
- Members: 9 member organizations
- Staff: 3200

The EDAPS Consortium (Ukrainian: ЄДАПС) was formed in Kyiv in 2004 by eight Ukrainian security printing and information technology companies. EDAPS specialises in manufacturing identity documents and information systems. They also create personalised bank cards and holographic elements.

== The EDAPS Consortium members ==
1. KP VTI, OJSC
2. ZNAK Ltd.
3. State Enterprise State Centre for Document Personalization
4. POLLY-SERVICE Ltd.
5. Specialized Enterprise HOLOGRAPHY Ltd.
6. COMMERCIAL INDUSTRIAL BANK, JSC
7. 3-Т Ltd.
8. INCOM Corporation

== History ==
EDAPS has fulfilled around 300 large-scale projects, producing documents and ePassports for the ICAO, EU, ОSCЕ, and Interpol.

EDAPS has also created production facilities, including issuing and outsourcing personalization of Visa and Mastercard payment cards.

=== 2004 ===
- March 2004 - EDAPS won the tender for designing and producing Ukrainian travel passports.
- September 2004 - Opening of the State Centre for Document Personalization, a location for personalization of identification documents, using techniques such as laser engraving and laser perforation.
- December 2004 - EDAPS became an associate member of Intergraf - The European Federation for Print & Digital Communication. EDAPS remained a member until 2012.

=== 2005 ===
- July 2005 - Znak Ltd., a manufacturer of plastic cards and ID-document application forms, started its manufacturing activity.

=== 2006 ===
- January 2006 - the EDAPS Consortium began manufacturing national driving licenses and vehicle registration certificates on a plastic base in Ukraine.

=== 2007 ===
- June 2007 - the EDAPS Consortium designed and presented the prototype of the electronic (biometric) travel passport.
- June 2007 - the EDAPS Consortium began implementing new travel passports with a polycarbonate data page in Ukraine.
- October 2007 - INCOM Corporation became a member of the EDAPS Consortium.

=== 2008 ===
- February 2008 - SE Holography Ltd., an EDAPS Consortium member, presented technology capable of demetallization of high resolution holograms.
- April 2008 - EDAPS won the international tender for creation of a demographic register in Kenya.
- April 2008 - EDAPS concluded a contract with De Beers Diamond Jewellers (Great Britain) for the development and issuance of a global identification system for De Beers jewellery, De Beers Diamond Passports.
- July–August 2008 - EDAPS won a tender for development of the National Register of Voters of Ukraine.
- September 2008 - the EDAPS Consortium member, POLLY-SERVICE company, opened the Interbank Personalization Bureau.
- November 2008 - the Ministry of Internal Affairs of Ukraine opened the Interregional Centre for Passport Document Issuance established upon the basis of EDAPS Consortium technologies.

=== 2009 ===
- February 2009 - the EDAPS Consortium implemented the Integrated Population Registration System of Kenya (IPRS), using biometric technologies.
- October 2009 - the EDAPS Consortium was officially appointed as the manufacturer of electronic passports for Interpol officers.
- October 2009 - Znak Ltd., a member of the EDAPS Consortium, began manufacturing microchip-based payment cards for the UkrCard Payment System.

=== 2010 ===
- April 2010 - a delegation from the National Academy of Sciences of Ukraine headed by NAS President Borys Paton visited the EDAPS Consortium. The scientists invited EDAPS to cooperate in innovations.
- October 2010 - at the Intergraf-2010 world forum in Barcelona, the EDAPS Consortium presented its own equipment for laser engraving and electronic personalization of ID-documents.
- November 2010 - The EDAPS Consortium was selected as the manufacturer for electronic biometric passports and ID-cards for INTERPOL.

=== 2016 ===
- December 2010 - the EDAPS Consortium was dissolved, given that it had achieved the common goals of its member companies (implementation of joint projects, scientific, technical and construction cooperation)

== Projects ==
=== Ukrainian Travel Passports ===
The launch of new Ukrainian travel passports was started in June 2007. The passport has 25 security levels. The passport design contains the traditional ornamental motifs and heraldry of Ukraine and its regions. The State Centre for Document Personalization is responsible for document personalisation, using laser engraving and perforation technology. The recorded information cannot be changed without destroying the form itself.

The MIA of Ukraine performs application, registration and issuance of the travel passports with the use of EDAPS technologies within the State Information System of Individual Persons Registration and Documentation (SIS).

=== Ukrainian Driving Licenses ===
In 2006, Ukraine started the production of national driving licenses and vehicle registration certificates in the form of plastic cards, protected with holographic security elements. The documents are designed by the EDAPS Consortium.

- Licenses for bearing and keeping arms in the form of plastic cards.
- A crew member certificate on a plastic basis.
- Electronic vehicle technical inspection card.

=== De Beers Diamond Passports ===
For De Beers Diamond Jewellers (Great Britain), the EDAPS Consortium has created a world identification system for De Beers jewellery, and has been issued De Beers Diamond Passports, which certify the authenticity of jewelry at any De Beers jeweller's. All data about De Beers jewellery is recorded in the passport page by laser engraving. Personalization of De Beers Passports is performed at the Personalization Bureau. The passport is protected with 29 security elements. EDAPS Consortium also provides secure access to De Beers information resources in all points of sale worldwide.

=== INTERPOL electronic documents ===
On November 8, 2010 the General Assembly of International Criminal Police Organization (INTERPOL) announced an initiative to implement electronic (biometric) passports and ID-cards, and selected the EDAPS Consortium as their manufacturer.

=== Bank card production ===
Znak Ltd. and the POLLY-SERVICE company develop, produce and personalise cards for approximately 60 Ukrainian and foreign banks, including the production of payment smart-cards for NMSEP.

=== Holographic elements ===
Specialized Enterprise HOLOGRAPHY Ltd., an EDAPS member, designs hologram technology, including demetallized high resolution holograms, bigrams and BEPRINT holograms. These holograms are used to secure documents and goods.

=== National Population Register of Kenya ===
The EDAPS Consortium developed and implemented the Integrated Population Registration System (IPRS) in Kenya. The IPRS construction is part of the National Population Register (NPR) project in Kenya.

=== National Register of Voters ===
EDAPS has been part of the development of the National Register of Voters in Ukraine.
