= Rukavychka =

Chain store in Western Ukraine

Rukavychka

Rukavychka (Ukrainian: Рукавичка, lit. 'Glove') is a chain store in Western Ukraine with a total number of 200 stores. It is part of the trade and production company "Lvivholod" (Ukrainian: Львівхолод), one of the largest retailers in Western Ukraine. It ranks 5th among Ukrainian food chains in terms of the number of stores.

== Information ==
The first "Rukavychka" store was opened in December 2003 in Peremyshliany. As of December 2022, the chain had 200 stores with over 3,600 employees. "Rukavychka" is currently opening its stores in Lviv and cities of the Lviv, Ternopil, Ivano-Frankivsk, Zakarpattia, Khmelnytskyi, Volyn and Rivne regions.

All commercial facilities with an area of 200 m^{2} to 1000 m^{2}, with an assortment of 2000 to 9000 items, including food products, household goods, hygiene products and more. "Rukavychka" has its own trademarks "Кухарочка", "Традиція", "Глянц", "То є просто" and "Сірко", under which it sells products of its own production and the best Ukrainian manufacturers.

== Ban of Russian products ==
At the end of January 2015, the "Rukavychka" retail chain announced a principled complete refusal to sell Russian products from February 1, 2015. Rukavychka became the first retail chain in Ukraine to take such a step.

In April 2019, it abandoned the Russian-language press and replaced it with a Ukrainian-language one.
