= Znak (company) =

- Formation: 2004
- Type: Enterprise
- Purpose: Manufacturing
- Location: Ukraine: Kyiv
- Product: Plastic cards and document application forms
- Staff: approx. 160
- Website: www.znak.ua

Znak, stylized in caps ZNAK, is a Ukrainian manufacturer of plastic payment cards, document application forms and polycarbonate pages for passports, etc. Located in Kyiv. It is a member of the Ukrainian EDAPS Consortium.

== History ==
=== Pre-2008 ===
- December 2004 – Znak became a member of International Card Manufacturers Association (ICMA) and the Fogra Graphic Technology Research Association (FOGRA).
- July 2005 – Znak begins producing goods.
- January 2006 – Znak started manufacturing national plastic driving licenses and vehicle registration certificates in Ukraine.
- June 2007 – Znak began manufacturing on polycarbonate pages for new state travel passports.

=== 2008 ===
- February 2008 – Znak won tender to supply Visa Electron plastic cards to JSC Belagroprombank, as well the tender to supply plastic cards to Russia's MCB Moscomprivatbank.
- April 2008 – Znak began manufacturing polymeric pages for De Beers jewellery passports.

=== 2009 ===
- October 2009 – ZNAK became the first Ukrainian manufacturer of payment cards with Sagem Orga chip, which was used for the Visa, Mastercard and UkrCard systems.
- October 2009 – the EDAPS Consortium was selected as the manufacturer of e-Passports and ID-cards for INTERPOL officers, with Znak manufacturing polycarbonate pages for passports and plastic cards.
- December 2009 – Znak underwent a successful audit for the ISO 9001 standard for quality management.

=== 2010 ===
- April 2010 – Znak received a delegation from the National Academy of Sciences of Ukraine headed by President of the NASU, Borys Paton.
- September 2010 – Znak introduced new custom bank card designs, including aromatized ones.

== Certificates and licenses ==
The enterprise is a certified manufacturer of plastic cards, including chip cards for the Mastercard Worldwide and Visa Inc. international payment systems, and the UrkCard payment system. The Quality Management System of the enterprise is certified in accordance with the requirements of the international standard ISO 9001:2000 and in the system UkrSEPRO in compliance with the state standards of Ukraine DSTU ISO 9001-2001. ZNAK has licenses from the Ministry of Finance of Ukraine and the Security Service of Ukraine.

== Membership of organizations ==
- International Card Manufacturers Association ICMA.
- Graphic Technology Research Association FOGRA
- Ukrainian Interbank Association of the Members of Payment Systems ЕМА.
- Kyiv Chamber of Commerce and Industry and Ukrainian Chamber of Commerce and Industry.

== Products ==
- Plastic application forms for identification documents (including electronic documents with contactless chip)
- Polycarbonate pages for passports
- Payment cards of VISA and MasterCard international payment systems, the National System of Mass Electronic Payments (NSMEP), UkrCard, Belcards: cards with chips and/or magnetic strip
- Cards for operators of cellular communications
- Other types of discount cards

As a member of the EDAPS Consortium, the Znak participates in state programs on the issuance of travel passports with a polycarbonate page, national driving licenses and vehicle registration certificates. The enterprise manufactures chip cards for the National System of Mass Electronic Payments (NSMEP) and Ukrainian and foreign banks.

The enterprise has an annual manufacturing capacity of 100 million payments cards, and 3 million polycarbonate pages for passports.
