= Roshen Kyiv Confectionery Factory =

Confectionery factory in Kyiv, Ukraine

Kyiv confectionery factory "Roshen"
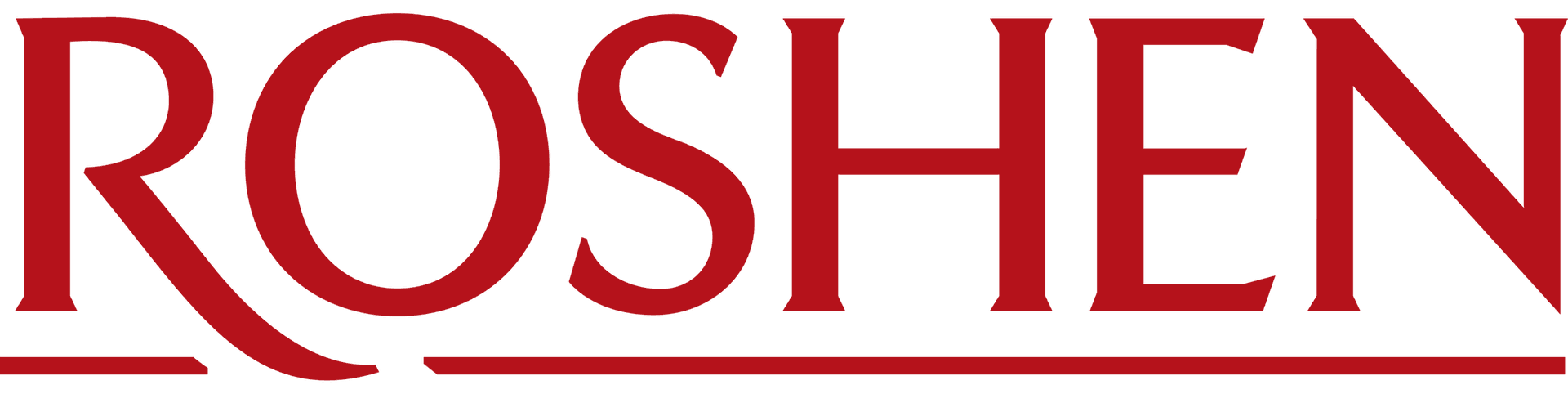
- Type: Privately held company
- Industry: confectionery
- Founded: 1874
- Founder: Valentyn Yefimov
- Headquarters: Kyiv, Ukraine
- Number of employees: 3 000
- Parent: Roshen Confectionery Corporation
- Website: Kyiv Confectionery Factory

Kyiv confectionery factory "Roshen" (Ukrainian: Київська кондитерська фабрика "Рошен"), formerly known as the Karl Marx Kyiv Confectionery Factory (Ukrainian: Київська кондитерська фабрика імені Карла Маркса) is the largest confectionery company in Kyiv, Ukraine, and the most important subdivision of the Roshen Confectionery Corporation.

The factory operates 36 production lines with a capacity annually for 60,000 tonnes of confectionery.

== History ==
=== In the Russian Empire and Soviet Union ===
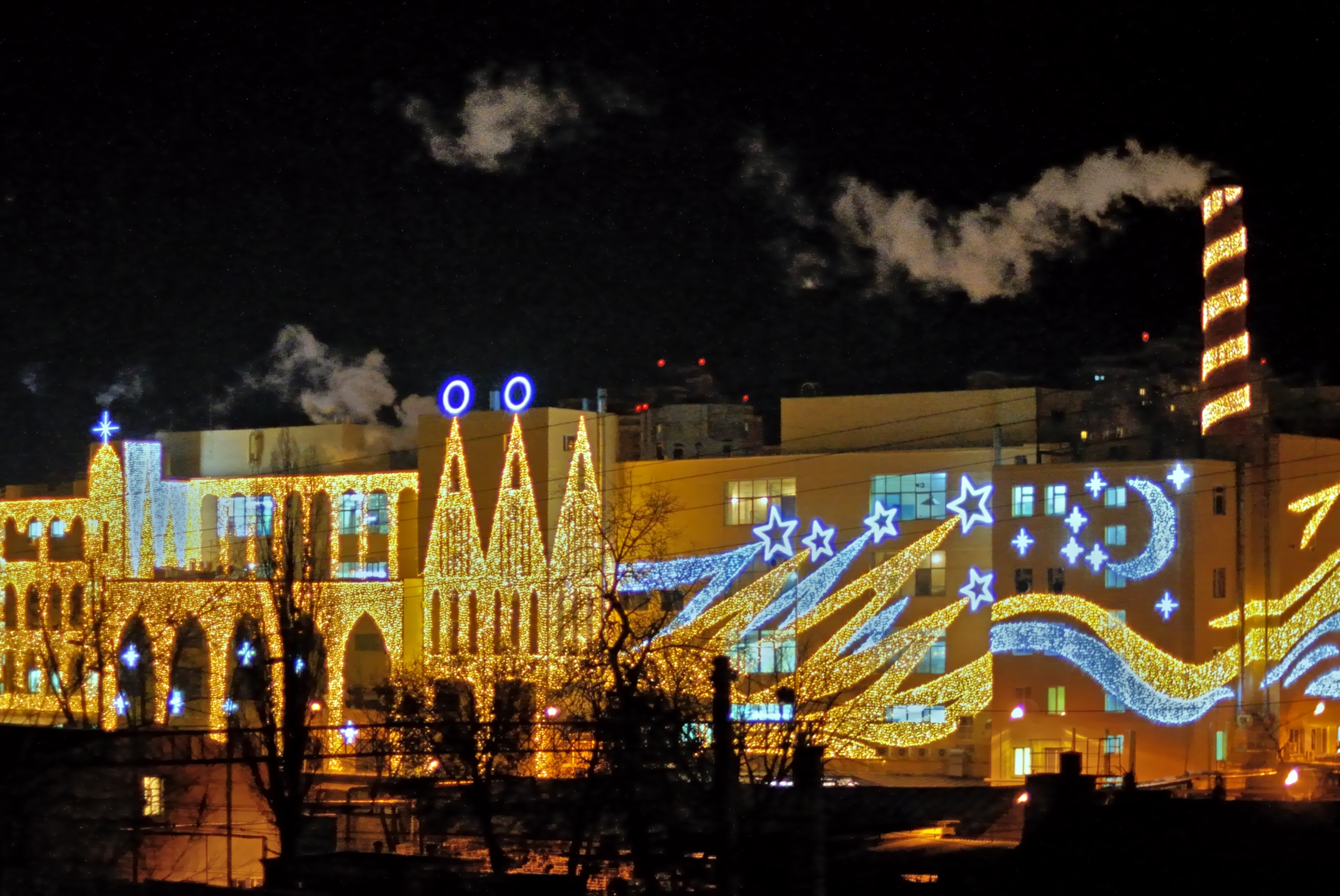
Kyiv Roshen Factory in the New Year 2012

The factory was founded in 1874 by Valentin Yefimov as the Demiivska Steam Factory of Chocolate and Sweets. In 1875, it had 24 yards and 200 workers were engaged in production. The production volume was about 200 tons per year. The factory produced chocolate, dragees, candies, caramel, marmalade, pastille, jam, gingerbread, tea biscuits and other sweets.

In 1923, it was named after Karl Marx by the Soviet authorities in order to celebrate his 105th anniversary. By 1930, the annual production was at around 7,000 tonnes, and by 1940 it had reached 33,000 tonnes with a workforce of 4,000 people. However, during World War II, the factory was partially destroyed during the Battle of Kiev. It was then reconstructed, and already by 1951 it was producing 49,000 tonnes of products. It was in 1956 that the factory's signature Kyiv Cake was invented by I. Petrenko at the location. By 1958, there were over 200 product types with 24 automated production lines. In 1966, it was awarded the Order of the Red Banner of Labour, one of the highest labour awards in the Soviet Union. During the 1970s, major work was done on the factory, including construction of new structures and facilities, and it was decided to increase the product range to include fruit marmalades, chocolate liqueur candles, and "Kyiv Evening" candies.

=== In Ukraine ===
Petro Poroshenko acquired control over the factory soon after its privatization in the 1990s, making it the basis for the future Roshen Corporation; a major modernization with Western equipment followed. In 2005, the factory joined the Roshen corporation. In 2009 closed joint-stock company "Karl Marx Kyiv Confectionery Factory" was renamed to public company ""Kyiv confectionery factory "Roshen"".

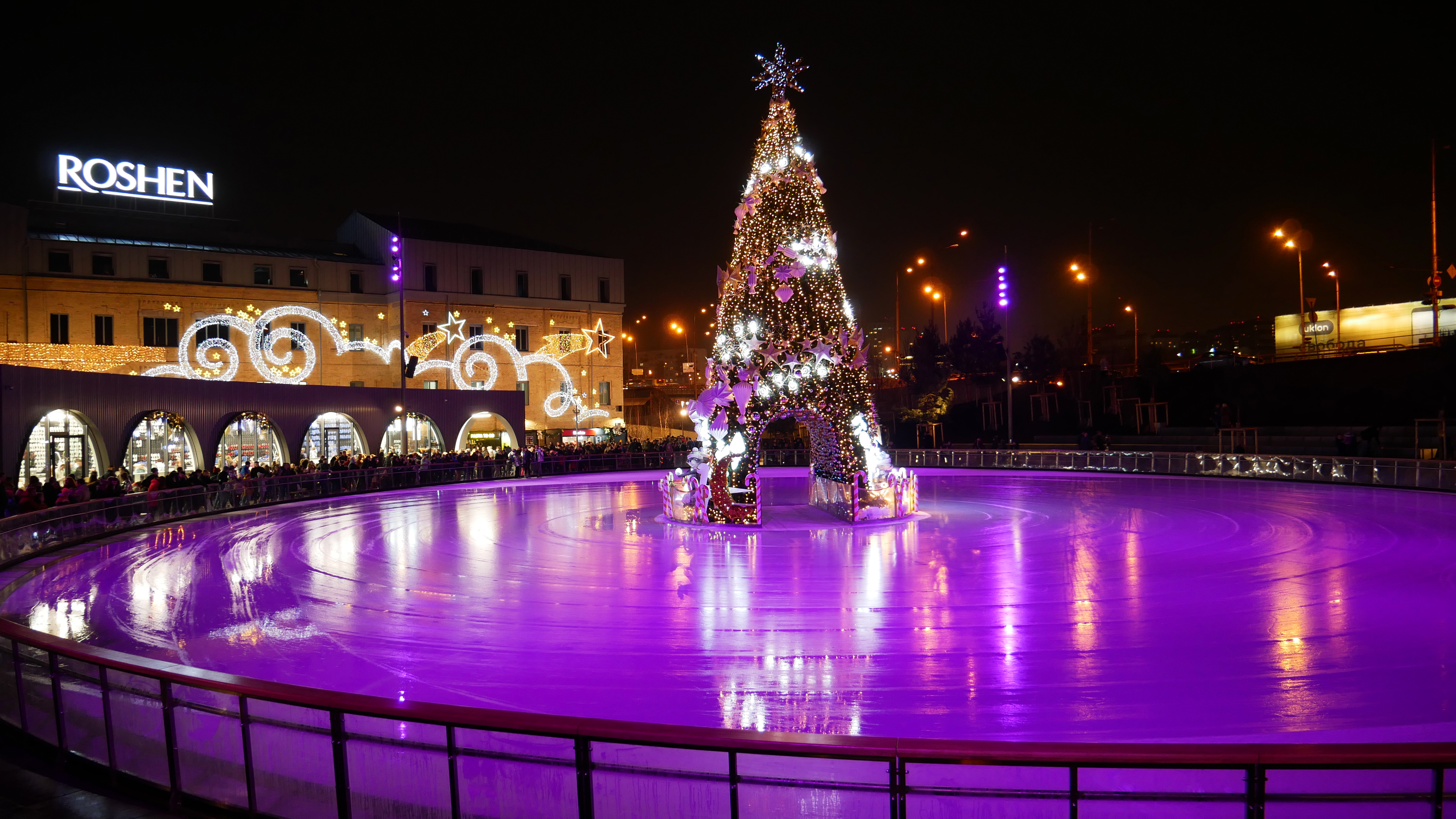
The new skating rink added at the site of the factory in 2019.

In 2018, at the site of the factory, it was decided to revamp the area with a new project that would add a skating rink, a technical complex for the video projection of the history of the factory, a dynamic fountain and a technical complex. At the time, Roshen said the cost for the renovation would be 90 million hryvnias and that it would be completed by 2020. It would be known as the "Roshen Plaza" to increase public space in Kyiv. Lady Pink, a graffiti artist from New York, also did a mural on the walls of the factory with a Ukrainian woman, a sunflower, the factory, and a cow. The second stage of the product, the "Winter Village" skating rink and fair, was set to be opened on 7 December 2019 and was worth 170 million hryvnias. The project to revitalize part of the Roshen factory won a bronze medal at the International Design Awards (IDA).

Following the Russian invasion of Ukraine, the factory was occasionally hit by Russian strikes on Kyiv. In September 2025, during a strike, a fire broke out at the factory, which was quickly extinguished. On 24 January 2026, the production building was hit by a missile, which killed one employee at the site and damaged the roof, top floor, facade, and windows. Poroshenko called the strike deliberate as it was a civilian workplace. Despite this, the factory's revenue grew to 1.4 billion hryvnias in 2024, and, with authorised capital, to 2.006 billion hryvnias for the year.

== Products ==
The factory produces more than 100 different products of confectionery, including a variety of chocolate bars, candies, cakes, cookies, and fruit jellies. Among the factory's best-known brands are: "Kyiv cake"; "Kyiv Vechirniy" chocolate and nut candies; "Chaika", "Teatralnyi" and "Alionka" plain chocolate bars and other products.
