= Ukrainsky, Volgograd Oblast =

Ukrainsky Украинский
- Khutor
- Location within Volgograd Oblast Location within Russia
- Coordinates: 50°47′N 41°21′E
- Country: Russia
- Region: Volgograd Oblast
- District: Uryupinsky District
- Time zone: UTC+4:00

Ukrainsky (Russian: Украинский) is a rural locality (a khutor) in Iskrinskoye Rural Settlement, Uryupinsky District, Volgograd Oblast, Russia. The population was 55 as of 2010.

== Geography ==
Ukrainsky is located in steppe, 58 km west of Uryupinsk (the district's administrative centre) by road. Loshchinovsky is the nearest rural locality.
