= Holography Ltd. =

- Formation: 2000
- Type: Enterprise
- Purpose: Manufacture of optical security elements (holograms), art hologram.
- Location: Ukraine: Kiev
- Staff: over 250
- Website: www.hologr.com

Specialized Enterprise Holography Ltd. (SE Holography) is a company that specializes in production of holograms and holographic security elements. Holography, a member-company of the EDAPS Consortium, is among the founders of the security printing industry in Ukraine. Established in 2000 with the support of the International Centre the Institute of Applied Optics on behalf of the National Academy of Sciences of Ukraine. Holography Ltd. is a member of the International Hologram Manufacturers Association (IHMA), a member of the International Society for Optical Engineering (SPIE) and a member of the Counterfeiting Intelligence Bureau at the International Chamber of Commerce of Ukraine.

The enterprise participates in events such as international conferences and exhibitions on security printing and holography (Holopack-Holoprint, Intergraf Security Printers Conference & Exhibition, Holoexpo, etc.). The Holography’s in-house developments are manufacturing technology for bigrams, biprint technology. The area of expertise is the development and mastering of holographic elements for anti-counterfeiting solutions to protect products and documents. In particular, optical security elements for Ukrainian excise stamps are currently being produced. Holography Ltd. also makes art holograms by reproducing images of historical and religious relics of Ukraine, which are exhibited at exhibitions, conferences, symposiums. Advisor Holography Ltd. in International and Corporate Development is Yuri Sidorenko

== History ==
SE Holography was established on February 2, 2000. Founders: the International Centre the Institute of Applied Optics at the National Academy of Sciences of Ukraine and JSC COMMERCIAL INDUSTRIAL BANK. Production began in November 2000. Boris Ye. Paton, the President of the National Academy of Sciences of Ukraine, attended the official opening ceremony of SE Holography held on December 6, 2000.

- In 2001 SE Holography received a license from the Security Service of Ukraine that permits the development, manufacture, implementation, import, export of holography-based security elements designed to meet government needs or custom-made for state authorities.
- In October–November 2001 a quality control system was certified in accordance with the international standard ISO 9001:2000 and national standard DSTU 9001-2001. April 2002 marked the introduction (in Ukraine) of control marks in the form of holographic security elements for anti-fraud protection of audio/video products. In August 2002 a new manufacturing unit for mastering art holograms (3-D holograms on glass) was created. In November of the same year the enterprise issued a novel product: a transparent film enhanced with holographic elements (holographic overlay) to reinforce the security of identity documents for officers of MIA of Ukraine.
- In March 2004 SE Holography was affiliated to the EDAPS Consortium.
- In 2006 the enterprise launched the production of Ukrainian driving licenses and transport registration certificates on plastic. These documents are protected with a holographic overlay produced by SE Holography. Testing carried out throughout the year of 2006 by SE Holography, together with Ukrainian scientists, yielded positive results that were used for making a brand new base for holography security elements with covert tags to upgrade the security of excise stamps on alcohol and tobacco.
- In October 2007 SE Holography was announced as the printing industry’s best enterprise according to evaluations by the State Statistics Committee for the National Business Rating of Ukraine.
- Since April 2008 SE Holography, as a member-enterprise of EDAPS, has supplied demetallized holograms for the issuance of jewellery passport for De Beers Diamond Jewellers.
- In October 2009 the General Assembly of INTERPOL endorsed the EDAPS Consortium as the manufacturer of e-passports for INTERPOL staff. These passports are protected with holograms created by SE Holography.
- In spring 2010 the American Cancer Society and World Lung Foundation recognized Ukraine as a global leader in combating illegal trade in tobacco products, and the technologies of EDAPS Consortium, in particular, those of SE Holography - as the most efficient ones.

== Products ==
Security elements rooted in innovation in holography have been manufactured and supplied by SE Holography for government needs such as projects on registered documents, including excise stamps.
