= Multiplex Cinema =

Cinema chain in Ukraine

Multiplex
- Company type: Joint-stock company
- Industry: Entertainment
- Founded: 2003
- Founder: Anton Puhach
- Headquarters: Kyiv, Ukraine
- Website: multiplex.ua

Multiplex Cinema are a chain of multiplex cinemas based in Ukraine.

== Origins ==
The first cinema in the chain was the City Centre Cinema in Mykolaiv, which was established in 2003. Cinemas in other cities and towns were then added to the newly formed Multiplex Group over the next few years.

== Locations ==
Multiplex Cinema currently have 27 cinema complexes throughout Ukraine:

- Cherkasy (2 cinemas)
- Chernihiv (1 cinema)
- Dnipro (2 cinemas)
- Kharkiv (2 cinemas)
- Kherson (1 cinema)
- Khmelnytskyi (1 cinema)
- Kyiv (8 cinemas)
- Kryvyi Rih (1 cinema)
- Lutsk (1 cinema)
- Lviv (2 cinemas)
- Mykolaiv (1 cinema)
- Poltava (1 cinema)
- Odesa (2 cinemas)
- Zaporizhzhia (1 cinema)
- Zhytomyr (1 cinema)
