= Yarych Confectionery =

Ukrainian food company

Yarych Confectionery Ltd
- Native name: ТОВ «Кондитерська фабрика "Ярич"»
- Founded: 1986
- Headquarters: Staryi Yarychiv, Ukraine
- Products: semi-sweet biscuits and cracker
- Revenue: 1,093,563,000 hryvnia (2025)
- Total assets: 549,671,000 hryvnia (2025)
- Number of employees: 2,361 (2025)
- Website: www.yarych.com

Yarych Confectionery Ltd (Ukrainian: ТОВ «Кондитерська фабрика "Ярич"») is a manufacturer of semi-sweet biscuits and crackers in Staryi Yarychiv, Lviv Raion, Lviv Oblast, Ukraine. The main products of the company are semi-sweet biscuits and crackers. Their biscuits are known under the Maria Classic branding in Ukraine, and under the "Petit-Beurre" name in the European Union.

The company was originally established in 1986, before being acquired by Nestle in 2000. It was sold to two Lviv-based businessmen in 2008, and shortly afterwards they started exporting internationally to the CIS countries. They ended their relationship with Nestle in 2010, wherein they produced biscuits for Svitoch. Starting in 2014, they started selling their products in the European Union.

== History ==
The factory was founded in 1986. It was a bakery that specialized in bakery products.

In 2000, it was bought by the international giant Nestle, together with the Lviv factory Svitoch. In 2008, Yarich was sold to Lviv businessmen Volodymyr Hnatiuk and Oleg Klimchuk. Following its acquireship by the Lviv businessman, it was restructured at Yarychiv LLC in 2008. Starting in September 2009, the company restarted producing packaged biscuits under the "Yarych" trade mark with the Maria Classic and then two other cracker varieties under its Krek Snek line. The planned monthly volumes were 20 tonnes of Maria biscuits and 15 tonnes of each cracker variant, alongside its other products. By the first half of 2009, they had sold 5,000 tonnes of Yarych biscuits and over 60 tonnes of Rozalini torts. That year, the company's revenue from product sales was 100 million hryvnias. Due to this, they started exporting more internationally to Azerbaijan, Belarus, Moldova, and Russia, with 342 tonnes shipped internationally.

In 2010, the brand ended its relationship with Nestlé. Under the partnership, although they were not owned by the company, they were producing biscuits for the Nestlé-owned Svitoch brand, which had accounted for 60% of the factory's biscuit output. The stated reason was so that the company could transition into producing solely for its own brand. That year, they also received the BRC certification, allowing their products to be sold in the European Union with an investment of $1-1.5 million being planned for development in the EU.

In October 2014, Poland started supplying private-label products for the Carrefour network. "Petit Beurre" cookies are new both for the factory and for the Ukrainian market, but are one of the most popular types in the segment of simple cookies in Europe. Confectioners have developed these sweets specifically for entering the European market. In 2016, the Deposit Guarantee Fund reported that Yarich owed ₴75 million on loans from the bankrupt Forum Bank, and that its production facilities, trademarks and corporate rights were pledged.

After this date, the company started to increase export internationally to Poland, Western Europe, the Middle East, and the United States. By 2018, it was planned that the company would start exporting deliveries to Asia by the end of that year. In November 2018, it was also announced that the factory had opened a third production line for biscuits to increase its capacity, and at the time, it was employing 526 people. On October 3, 2018, the Antimonopoly Committee of Ukraine allowed Horizon Capital to acquire the factory. Horizon Capital is owned by the Cypriot company Dilbeta Investments Limited and Sermola Holdings Limited.
