= Asuka Oda =

Japanese actress, gravure idol, and tarento

- 小田 飛鳥
- Born: 20 March 1990 (age 36); Chiba Prefecture, Japan
- Other names: Sexy Banchō; Asuka-san (飛鳥さん)
- Occupations: Actress; gravure idol; television personality
- Spouse: Yamato Koganemaru (m. 2012)
- Children: 1
- Modeling information
- Height: 170 cm (5 ft 7 in) (2015)
- Agency: GOLDSTAR

Asuka Oda (小田 飛鳥, Oda Asuka; born 20 March 1990) is a Japanese actress, gravure idol, and tarento. Her real name is unpublished.

== Biography ==
She was from Chiba on her profile, but she grew up in Chiba Prefecture and lives in Tokyo, and born in Tokyo. She is a Nihon University Law School Graduate. Her affiliated office is GOLDSTAR.

Aspiring to becoming an actress, she went to university and began learning acting at acting school. After that, she entered a troupe and devoted herself to acting. In 2011, she was scouted and joined her entertainment office because she appeared on TV Tokyo's Gokujō Jikara. Since then she has been active as a gravure idol for releasing DVDs, shooting sessions, variety shows and more. She was drawing attention as a sexy tarento, such as taking first place in a major mail-order site when releasing DVDs.

She is sometimes called "Sexy Banchō" (セクシー番長, Sekushī Banchō).

=== Professional wrestling ===
She appeared at the Lucha Libre Workshop hosted by Mister Cacao, and on 17 September 2017, she was announced to make an exhibition debut at Fukumen Mania.

== Personal life ==
On April 2, 2026, it was revealed that she is actually married with screenwriter Yamato Koganemaru in 2012. She has a child who was born in 2023.

== Appearances ==
=== Television ===
- Gokujō Jikara (2011, TX)
- 10-Ri Waraeba Strike! Shinshun! Tōzai Taikō Boke Bowl (2013, KTV)
- Shiseikatsu Mukidashi Variety 'Kiriuri$Idol' (2014, Tokyo MX)
- Mayonaka no Obaka Sawagi! (2015–, Tokyo MX)
- Tokyo Audition (Kari) (2015–, Tokyo MX)
- Idol Pururun! Traveller (2016–, Sun TV) – MC
- Kayo Kizuna Trendy (Chiba TV)

=== Films ===
- Seiha 3 (2015, All In Entertainment) – as Mihime Ito
- Keiyaku Kekkon (27 Aug 2017, Director Shinji Imaoka) – as Aki

=== Direct-to-video ===
- Hakui no Senshi Ultimate Angel (2016, Zen-Pictures) – as Mai Tendo/Ultimate Angel
- Shin Heroine Kiki Ippatsu!! 11 Kurenai no Megami Wonder Freya (Aug 2017, Zen Pictures) – as Maya Mikami/Kurenai no Megami Wonder Freya
- Girls Senshi Funitas –Hitsuyō Saiteigen no Gohōshi– Daiisshō (Sep 2017, Orstack Soft Hanbai) – as Bishop First Duke

=== Magazines ===
- Shūkan Taishū
- Yha!Hip!&Lip
- Photo Technique Digital
- Shūkan Jitsuwa
- Friday
- EX Max! Special

=== Stage ===
- 2011
  - Hinatabokko – as Miho Suzuki (Protagonist)
  - Season –Meguriai– Yamato Kikaku Performance
- 2012
  - Air Studio Juliet (Protagonist) – WWeb
  - tay chang stay challenge – as Mika (heroine)
- 2015
  - Rubber Girl Solo Live Girl+ – Guest appearance
  - Murako Theater 5218 Give me chocolate – as Monster, Wife

=== Internet television ===
- 2016
  - AbemaTV Peachannel regular
  - AbemaTV Onegai Ranking

=== Round girl ===
- Knock Out vol.1 12 Feb 2017
- Knock Out vol.2 1 Apr 2017
- Professional Shuto Kōshiki-sen

=== Events ===
- Reina Joshi Pro Wrestling (18 Jun, Ōji Basement Monster)

== Works ==
=== DVD ===
- H na Yūwaku (30 Aug 2013, Grasso)
- Over Flow (29 Nov 2013, S Digital)
- H×holic (28 Feb 2014, Grasso)
- Haitoku Renai (27 Jun 2014, Grasso)
- Mōsō Chūdoku (31 Oct 2014, Grasso)
- Glamorous (27 Mar 2015, Kingdom)
- Dynamite (22 May 2015, Kingdom)
- La France (24 Jul 2015, Kingdom)
- Ma cherie (18 Sep 2015, Kingdom)
- on the Bed (27 Nov 2015, Kingdom)
- Cobalt Blue (8 Jan 2016, Kingdom)
- heat! (11 Mar 2016, Kingdom)
- I love you (13 May 2016, Kingdom)
- Sexy Honey (15 Jul 2016, Kingdom)
- Emerald (16 Sep 2016, Kingdom)
- Kindan no Rakuen (14 Oct 2016, Kingdom) – Co-starred with Manami Sonosaki
- fly to you (16 Dec 2016, Kingdom)
- Amore (17 Feb 2017, Kingdom)
- Venice (21 Apr 2017, Kingdom)
- Kachō Fūgetsu (23 Jun 2017, Kingdom)
- Memory of London (25 Aug 2017, Kingdom)
- Spicy Love (27 Oct 2017, Kingdom)
- Yuri no Hana Saku (24 Nov 2017, Kingdom) – Co-starred with Mio Mito
- Silent Night (29 Dec 2017, Kingdom)
- Elegant (23 Feb 2018, Kingdom)
- Oriental Bijo (27 Apr 2018, Kingdom)
- Yuri no Mitsu (25 May 2018, Kingdom) – Co-starred with Mio Mito
- Enbi (29 Jun 2018, Kingdom)
- Next Stage (28 Aug 2018, Kingdom)
- Kokumajutsu (22 Dec 2023, Kingdom)
- Mitsugetsu Monogatari (22 Mar 2024, Kingdom)
- Love Dolce (26 Apr 2024, Kingdom) – Co-starred with Hikaru Ozaki
- Makaha Valley (10 May 2024, Kingdom)
- Istanbul (28 Jun 2024, Kingdom) – Co-starred with Hikaru Ozaki
- Bosphorus Kaikyō (19 Jul 2024, Kingdom)
- Anata ga Hoshii (13 Sep 2024, Kingdom)
- Love & Peace (25 Oct 2024, Kingdom) – Co-starred with Hikaru Ozaki
- Burning Love (8 Nov 2024, Kingdom)
- Irokoi Man'yūki (17 Jan 2025, Kingdom)
- Megami no Shizuku (14 Mar 2025, Kingdom)
- Sōkai Love (16 May 2025, Kingdom)
- Bakunyū Impact (25 Jul 2025, Kingdom)

=== Photo albums ===
- Asuka Oda 1st Shashin-shū Asuka (25 Dec 2015, Saibunkan Shuppan)
- Seiiki (21 Apr 2018, Kobunsha)
- Ichigo Ichie (18 Sep 2020, Kodansha)
- Tennyo no Shizuku (30 Jul 2021, Shogakukan)

=== Serialisations ===
- "Sexy Banchō Asuka Oda!" (7 Apr 2017 –, Tokyo Sports)
