= Ukrainsky, Voronezh Oblast =

Ukrainsky Украинский
- Khutor
- Location within Voronezh Oblast Location within Russia
- Coordinates: 50°13′N 39°42′E
- Country: Russia
- Region: Voronezh Oblast
- District: Rossoshansky District
- Time zone: UTC+3:00

Ukrainsky (Russian: Украинский) is a rural locality (a khutor) and the administrative center of Aleynikovskoye Rural Settlement, Rossoshansky District, Voronezh Oblast, Russia. The population was 536 as of 2010. There are 9 streets.

== Geography ==
Ukrainsky is located 15 km northeast of Rossosh (the district's administrative centre) by road. Babki is the nearest rural locality.
