= Asuka Hisa =

American artist

Asuka Hisa is a Los Angeles–based artist, educator and curator. She currently serves as the Director of Learning and Engagement at the Institute of Contemporary Art Los Angeles, formerly known as the Santa Monica Museum of Art. In 2015 she served on the Bergamot Station Arts Center Advisory Committee. Her work has been shown at physical galleries and digital art spaces including Curatorial Hub and advocates for biking as a sustainable mode of transportation.

As an arts educator, Asuka Hisa takes a holistic approach and notes that her "anchor is art and how does art fit into the world? Or how does art fit into life? How does art fit into the city? It’s actually everywhere and I can make those connections and design these investigations and explorations and experiments and opportunities in partnerships”

Hisa is a member of Common Field and sits on the Board of Directors for Automata Arts. She served as a curatorial advisor for the 2019 Triennial CURRENT:LA FOOD series put together by the Los Angeles Department of Cultural Affairs.
