= ASKA Insurance Company =

Ukrainian insurance company (1990–2022)

ASKA
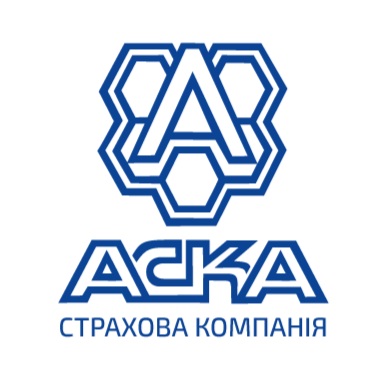
- Type: Private Joint Stock Company
- Industry: Insurance
- Founded: 1990
- Defunct: 2022
- Fate: Acquired and merged
- Successor: Vuso
- Headquarters: Kyiv, Ukraine
- Website: aska.ua

ASKA was a Ukrainian insurance company headquartered in Kyiv, Ukraine. In 2022, it was acquired and merged into Ukrainian insurance company VUSO. Prior to its merger Andrey Olegovich Shukatko was the Chief Executive Officer.

== History ==
It was established on 20 June 1990 as part of ASKO holding (Russia), ASKA Ukrainian insurance company has been operating as Ukraine's first private insurer since 1995.

ASKA authorized capital made ₴174.585 million as of 1 January 2011.

ASKA regional network included 41 branches and 66 offices across Ukraine. ASKA Ukrainian Insurance Private Joint Stock Company operated as a subsidiary of System Capital Management Limited.

According to the results of the first nine months of 2018, it became one of the ten largest insurance companies in Ukraine in terms of insurance payments.

== Merger ==
In August 2022, the insurance company VUSO announced the merger of the companies. In May 2023, the unification process was completed and Aska ceased to exist as an independent legal entity.

== See also ==
- Amica Mutual Insurance
