= Staryi Yarychiv =

Rural locality in Lviv Oblast, Ukraine

Staryi Yarychiv Старий Яричів
- Location within Lviv Oblast Location within Ukraine
- Coordinates: 49°54′44″N 24°16′5″E
- Country: Ukraine
- Oblast: Lviv
- Raion: Lviv Raion
- Council: Staroyarychivska Village Council
- Established: 1563

Area
  - Total: 2.1 km^{2} (0.81 sq mi)
- Elevation: 228 m (748 ft)

Population
  - Total: 1,746
  - Density: 830/km^{2} (2,200/sq mi)
- Postal code: 80463
- Area code: +380 3254

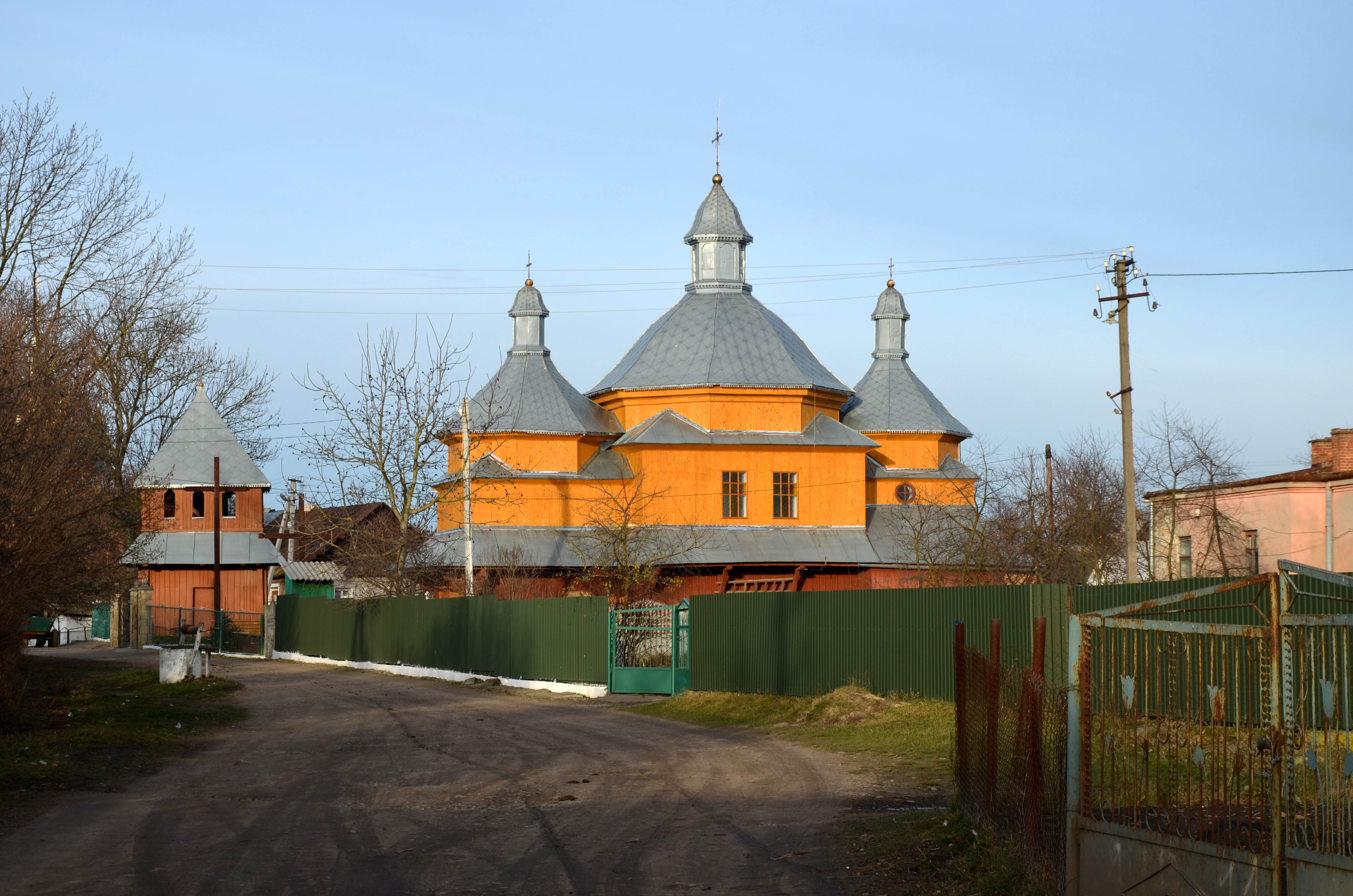
Church of the Introduction to the Church of the Most Holy Theotokos in the village of Stary Yarychiv

Staryi Yarychiv (Ukrainian: Старий Яричів) is a community in Lviv Raion, Lviv Oblast, Ukraine. It belongs to Novyi Yarychiv settlement hromada, one of the hromadas of Ukraine. Population 1746 people.

Until 18 July 2020, Staryi Yarychiv belonged to Kamianka-Buzka Raion. The raion was abolished in July 2020 as part of the administrative reform of Ukraine, which reduced the number of raions of Lviv Oblast to seven. The area of Kamianka-Buzka Raion was split between Chervonohrad and Lviv Raions, with Staryi Yarychiv being transferred to Lviv Raion.

The Yarych Confectionery factory is located here.
