= Ukrainskoye =

Ukrainskoye Украинское
- Selo
- Location within Republic of Dagestan Location within Russia
- Coordinates: 43°54′N 47°00′E
- Country: Russia
- Region: Republic of Dagestan
- District: Kizlyarsky District
- Time zone: UTC+3:00

Ukrainskoye (Russian: Украинское) is a rural locality (a selo) in Chernyayevsky Selsoviet, Kizlyarsky District, Republic of Dagestan, Russia. The population was 209 as of 2010. There is 1 street.

== Geography ==
Ukrainskoye is located 36 km northeast of Kizlyar (the district's administrative centre) by road. Sangishi and Burumbay are the nearest rural localities.

== Nationalities ==
Avars, Chechens, Tsakhurs, Russians and Tabasarans live there.
