= Ukrainskiy Retail =

Ukrainian retail store chain

Ukrainskiy Retail (Ukrainian: Український Рітейл) is one of the biggest retail chains in Ukraine, represented by 86 stores in eastern Ukraine. Established on 13 September 2006, the company was headquartered in Donetsk, with Dmitriy Kulik as its CEO. It ensures ensures trade operations with a chain of retail "corner-shop" stores under Brusnytsya (eng. Lingonberry) brand. The first Brusnytsya store was opened in March 2007 in Donetsk.

As of October 2011, Ukrainskiy Retail employed around 3000 people and Brusnytsya had 86 stores in the towns of Eastern Ukraine region. In September 2011 Brusnytsya shops were restyled to the new format of fresh-markets Brusnychka In September 2011 the company won the National Award «Private Label – 2011», in the category "Best contribution to the development of the product category".

== See also ==
- List of supermarkets
