= Roshen =

Ukrainian confectionery manufacturing group

Roshen Confectionery Corporation

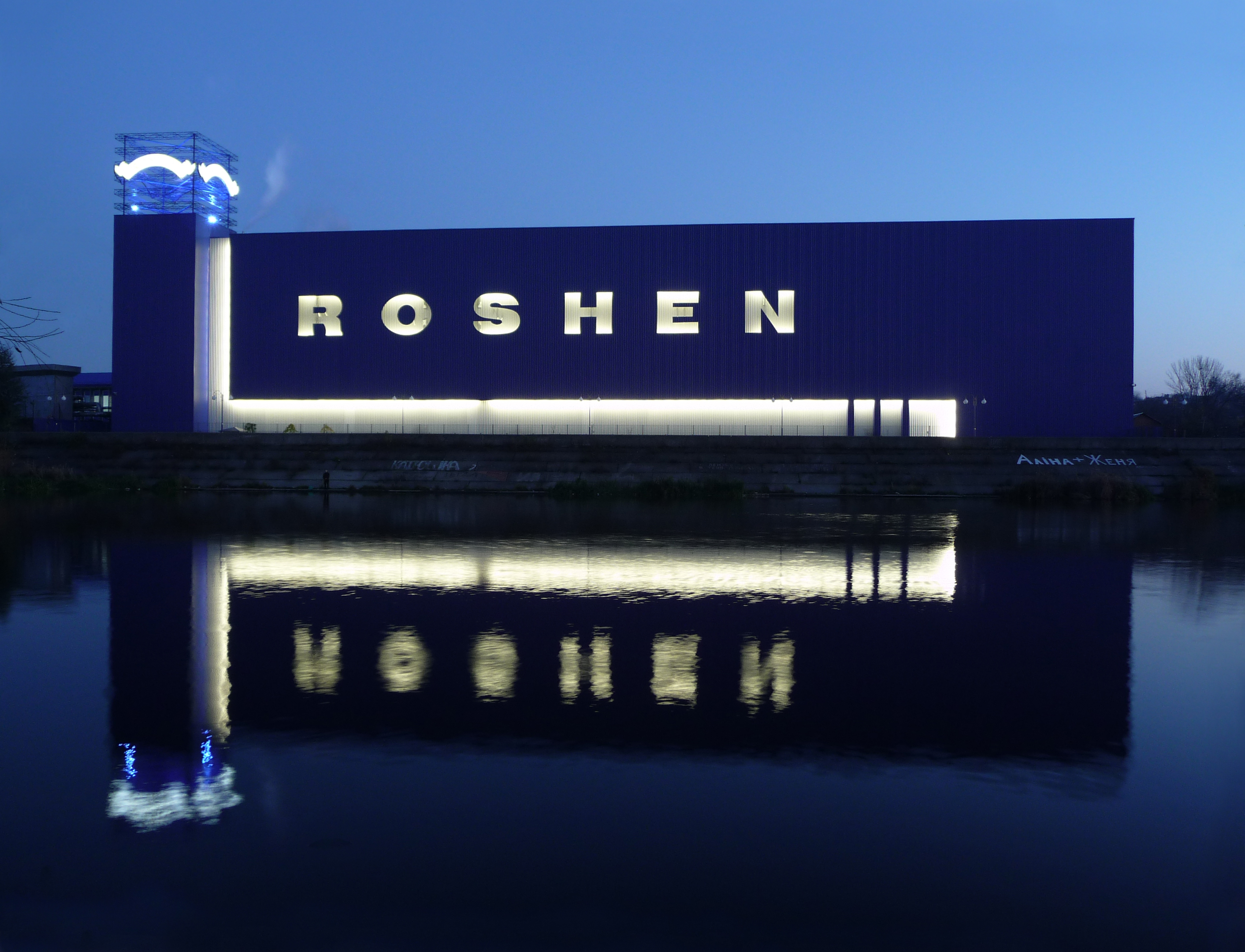
- Roshen factory in Vinnytsia
- Native name: Кондитерська корпорація «Рошен»
- Type: Privately held company
- Industry: Confectionery
- Founded: 1996
- Founder: Petro Poroshenko
- Headquarters: Kyiv, Ukraine
- Area served: Europe, Asia, North America
- Key people: Petro Poroshenko
- Products: 350 various types of confectionery
- Revenue: ▲€803 million (2023)
- Net income: ▲€141 million (2023)
- Total assets: 457,201,000 hryvnia (2025)
- Number of employees: 10,000 (2012, including subsidiaries)
- Website: roshen.com

Roshen Confectionery Corporation (Ukrainian: Кондитерська корпорація «Рошен», romanized: Kondyterska korporatsiia "Roshen") is a Ukrainian confectionery manufacturing group. It operates facilities in the Ukrainian cities of Kyiv, Vinnytsia, Ivankiv, and Kremenchuk, as well as in Budapest, Hungary, and Klaipėda, Lithuania. The company's name is derived from the last name of its former owner, Petro Poroshenko (Poroshenko), who was the president of Ukraine from 2014 to 2019.

In 2012, the Roshen Corporation ranked 18th in the "Candy Industry Top 100" list of the world's largest confectionery companies. It has a total annual production volume of 410,000 tonnes. The company exports to Kazakhstan, Uzbekistan, Kyrgyzstan, Tajikistan, Azerbaijan, Georgia, Armenia, Moldova, Estonia, Hungary, Poland, Latvia, Lithuania, the United States, Canada, Germany, Romania, Finland, Bulgaria, and Israel. Previously, it also exported to Russia, from which it derived 40 percent of its gross revenue until Russia ceased importing from the company in July 2013. In early 2017, Candy Industry placed ROSHEN in 24th place in the "2017 Global Top 100" of confectionery producers and estimated its annual revenue at $800 million.

== Owners and management ==
Participating in the 2014 presidential election in Ukraine, Petro Poroshenko announced his intention to sell Roshen after his victory to avoid any conflicts of interest. At a press conference on June 5, 2015, in Kyiv, Poroshenko assured that he intended to transfer his stake in the confectionery corporation "Roshen" to the management of a private investment banking company, N M Rothschild & Sons, owned by the Rothschild family. In January 2016, he announced the signing of an agreement on the transfer of these shares. And in April 2016, Poroshenko placed his shares in the Roshen Confectionery Corporation into a blind trust managed by Rothschild Trust.

== History ==
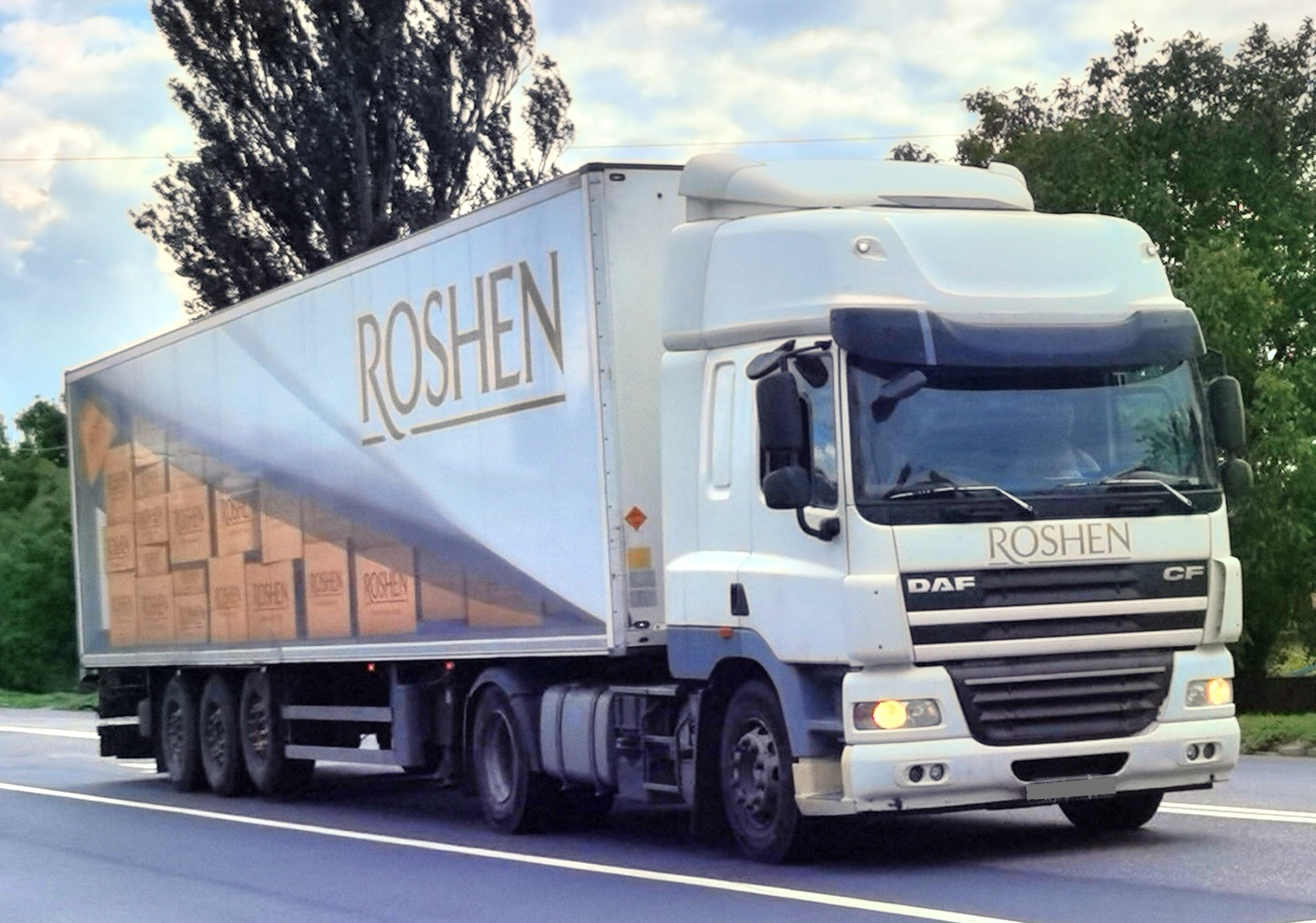
Roshen truck

Two years after the collapse of the Soviet Union, in 1993, the Poroshenko family founded a concern called Ukrprominvest for a mass privatization of former state-owned factories. In 1996 after the acquisition of confectionery factories in Kyiv and Vinnytsia, 'Ukrprominvest Kondyter' was created. Later it bought factories in Mariupol in 1997 and Kremenchuk in 2000. In 1998 the company also privatized a milk factory in Bershad. A confectionery factory in Russian Lipetsk in 2000 became the first factory of the brand to be bought outside of Ukraine.

In 2002 Ukrprominvest Kondyter ordered their new branding from a Marketing Technologies Bureau in Kyiv. They removed the first and last two letters from the Poroshenko last name, shortening it to 'Roshen', and chose 'The sweet quality mark' as a company slogan. Roshen feared that their new name didn't sound Ukrainian enough for its domestic market, so three different brand legends were created: one about a count Roshen who visited Ukraine to provide a new chocolate recipe, one about Roshen being a Swiss quality mark for confectionery, and one about Roshen being an ancient god of sweets. Eventually all three stories were scrapped and none of them were used in promotion.

In 2006 Roshen bought a confectionery factory in Klaipėda, Lithuania. In 2010 Klaipėdas Konditerija was renamed to Roshen Klaipėda Confectionery Factory.

In March 2012, Roshen began co-production with a contract manufacturer in Hungary called "Bonbonetti."

During the election campaign of the 2014 Ukrainian presidential election, Roshen owner Petro Poroshenko pledged to sell all his shares in Roshen if elected president. Although Poroshenko was elected president, by late December 2014, he was unable to find a buyer for the company. Because of this, in January 2016, Poroshenko transferred his share of the corporation to an independent blind trust. The Bank Ruling Trust has a four-year-old proxy to negotiate the sale of assets.

In June 2014 the Bershadmoloko milk factory was transferred from Bershad to a newly built facility in Vinnytsia, and was renamed the Roshen Vinnytsia Milk Factory.

Roshen closed down its confectionery factory in Mariupol (Ukraine) in 2015 due to the proximity of the Donbas war and an export ban imposed by Russia, which made production there unviable.

In 2017 Roshen quit Russia, shutting down their factory in Lipetsk which has been a center of controversy for working for Russian market despite the Russo-Ukrainian war.

In 2018–2019 Roshen built a biscuit-producing complex in Boryspil, Kyiv Oblast.

In March 2022, the corporation reported the suspension of operations at two factories, located in Kyiv and Boryspil, as well as a reduction in production capacity at its facilities in Vinnytsia and Kremenchuk. Sales in the first months of the invasion declined fivefold, to approximately 3,000 tonnes. As of 2023, Roshen ranked 23rd in Candy Industry's Top 100 confectionery companies, with reported sales of US$800 million.

In 2024, Russia nationalized the former Lipetsk confectionery factory previously owned by Petro Poroshenko.

On February 7, 2026, Russia launched a large-scale attack on Ukraine. A nighttime attack by Russian drones set fire to warehouses owned by Roshen in the town of Yagotyn, Kyiv region. Later reports indicated that Roshen's logistics center in Yagotyn, the company's largest warehouse for finished products, was almost completely destroyed. While eliminating the consequences of the enemy attack and extinguishing a large fire in warehouses in Yagotyn, a sudden collapse of the structure killed 30-year-old firefighter Mykhailo Protsenko. Senior Sergeant Serhiy Khobotnya, 49-year-old commander of the 22nd Fire and Rescue Unit, was also injured.

== Products and brands ==
"ROSHEN" serves as the overarching brand encompassing all products within the corporation. The name is derived from Poroshenko, the surname of its former owner. ROSHEN makes over 350 confectionery items, including chocolate and jelly sweets, caramel, toffee, chocolate bars, biscuits, wafers, sponge rolls, pastries, and cakes. Annually, the corporation produces approximately 300,000 tonnes of confectionery. In 2013, the company had a product range of approximately 200 confectionery items and achieved a total output of 410,000 tonnes.

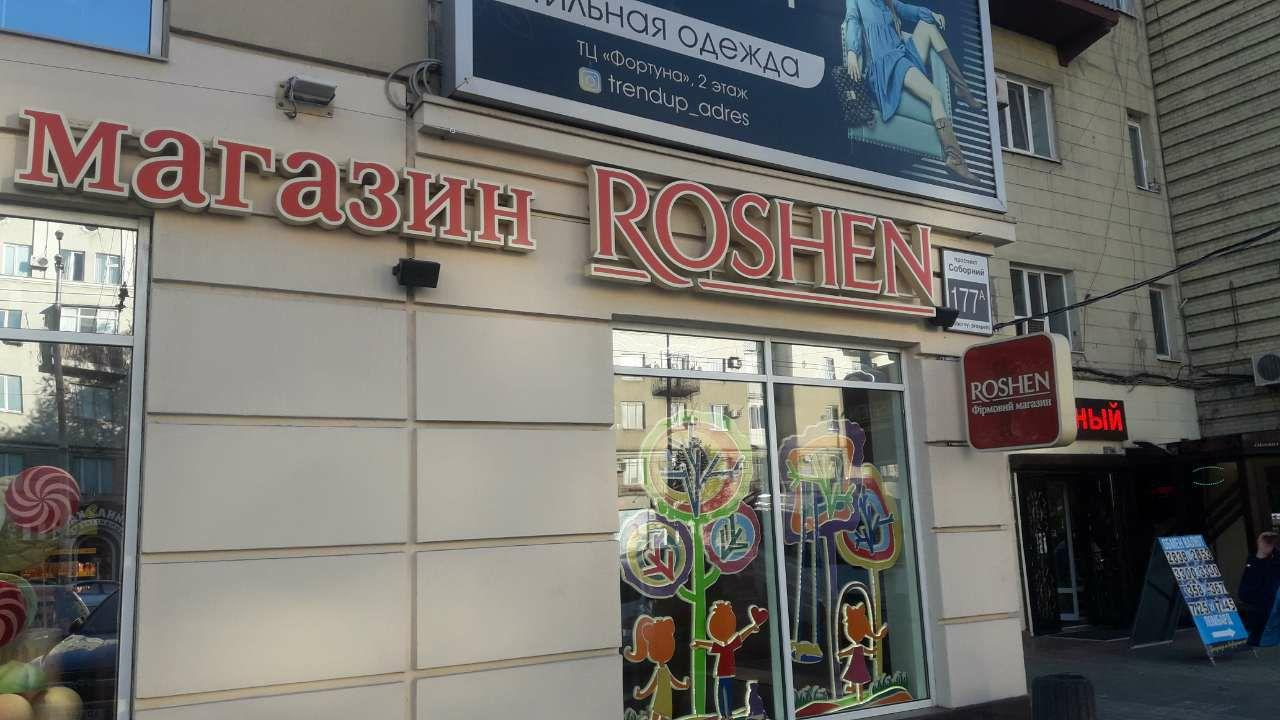
A Roshen storefront located in Ukraine

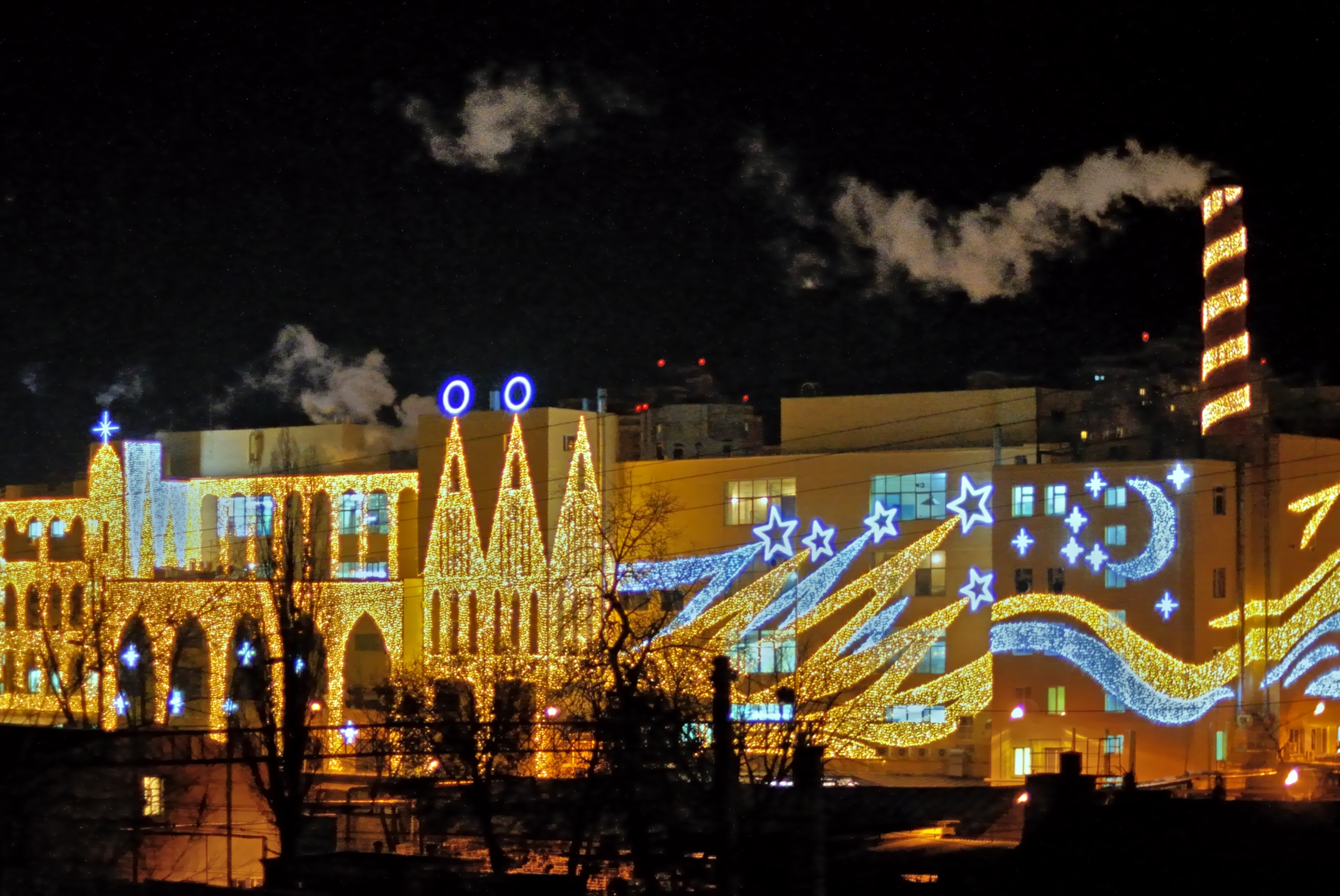
The Roshen Factory in Kyiv during New Year's in 2012

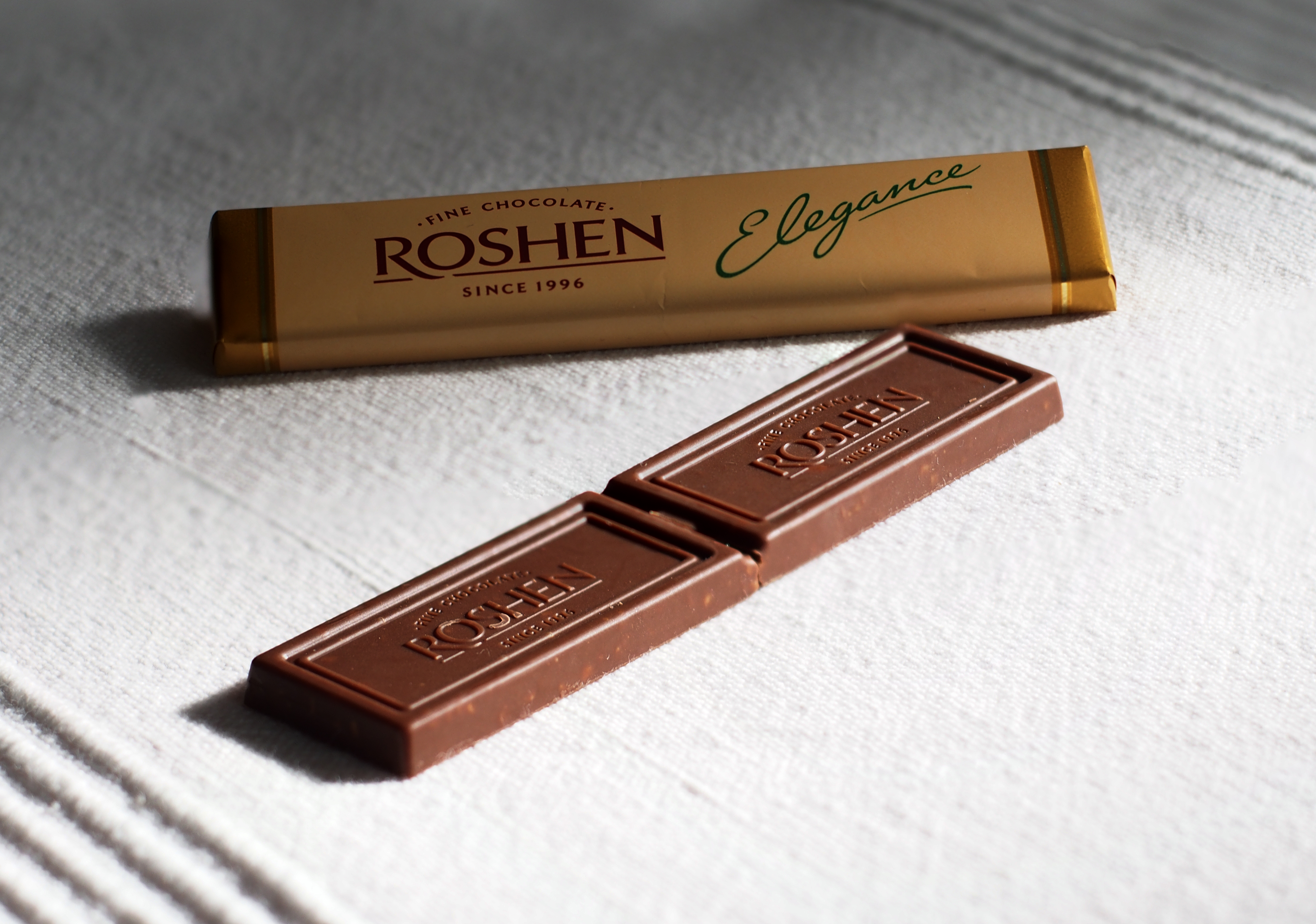
A piece of Roshen chocolate

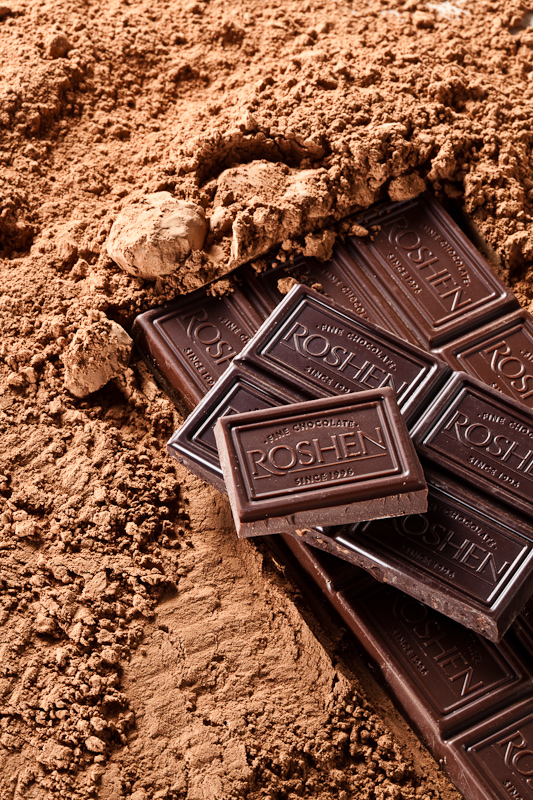
A bar of Roshen chocolate

A Roshen shop in Kamianske

== Factories ==
=== Current ===
- Roshen Kyiv Confectionery Factory
- Roshen Vinnytsia Confectionery Factory
- Roshen Kremenchuk Confectionery Factory
- Roshen Klaipėda Confectionery Factory
- Roshen Vinnytsia Milk Factory
- Roshen Biscuit Complex
- Bonbonetti Choco Confectionary Limited Liability Company
- Vinnytsia Dairy Plant "ROSHEN"
- Biscuit complex Roshen LLC

=== Former ===
- Roshen Lipetsk Confectionery Factory
- Roshen Mariupol Confectionery Factory

== Social projects ==
=== Playgrounds ===
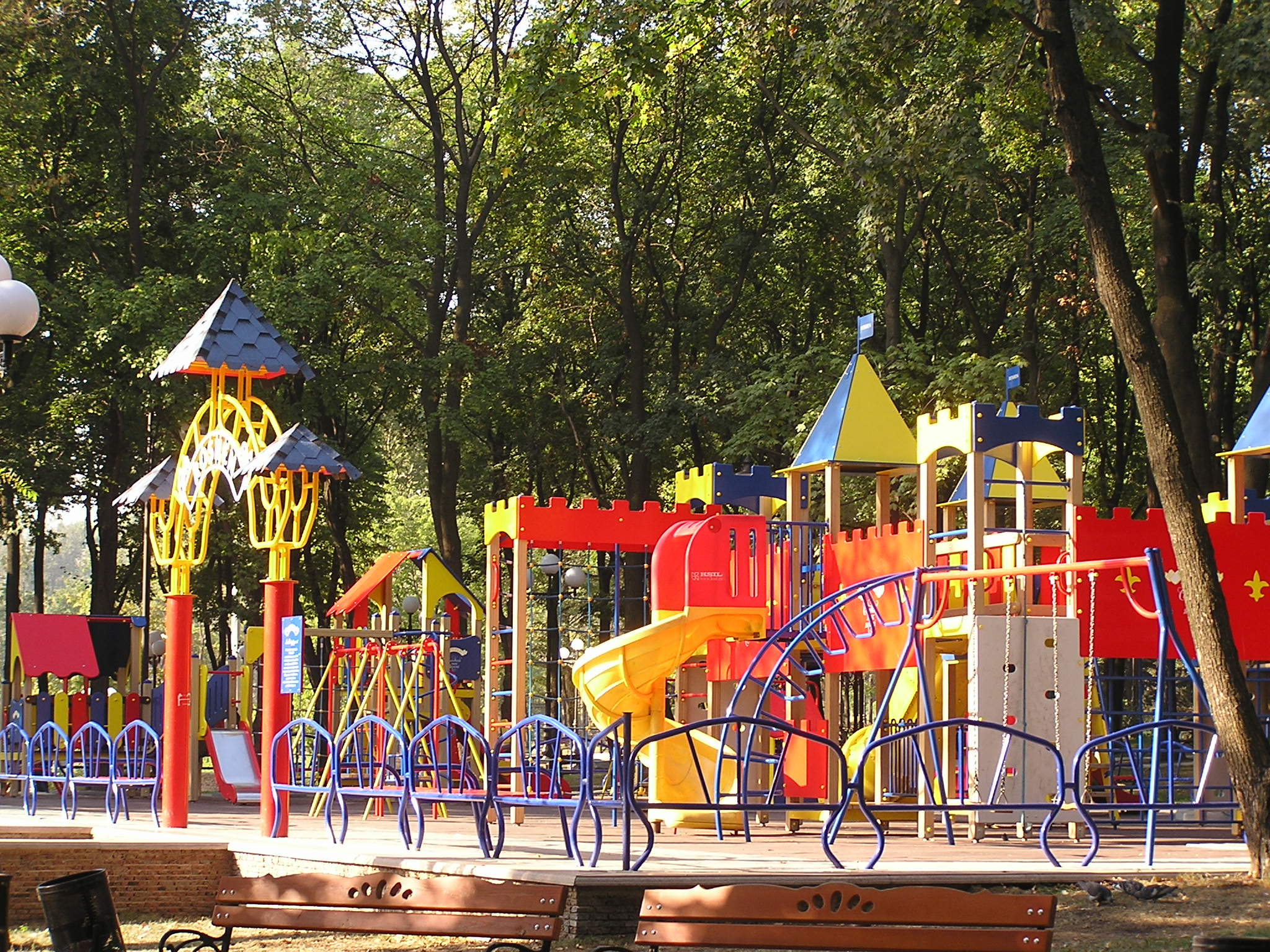
A typical Roshen playground in Donetsk

In 2005 Roshen began to assist Ukrainian cities in park reconstructions installing children's playgrounds with their branding. Throughout the project's life Roshen installed 80 playgrounds across Ukraine, despite them being in communal property the corporation took a responsibility of maintaining them. In 2019 the company announced that due to the lack of government's effort in fighting vandalism they have to end the project. Since then the Roshen branding has been removed from the playgrounds and local authorities either took over their maintenance or dismantled them. Roshen's social projects director Iryna Ponomarenko stated that the company still views their playground project as a positive experience due to it setting the trend of private companies involvement in this kind of investments in Ukraine.

=== Okhmatdyt children's hospital charity ===
In 2015-2018 Roshen has been helping Kyiv's specialized children hospital Okhmatdyt. In May 2015 Roshen bought Draeger Primus anaesthesia workstation for surgery department. In 2016 the company bought ValleyLab Force Triad energy platform, Zoll R-Series defibrilator and Steris surgery tables. In 2017 Roshen funded the reconstruction of Okhmatdyt sterile processing department. In 2018 the corporation purchased 3000 units of surgery tools for the hospital. In total Roshen spent UAH 99,7 million on the medical sphere charity.

== Controversies ==
=== Connection to ICU ===
On several occasions, Roshen founder Poroshenko and Ukrainian firm Investment Capital Ukraine (ICU) were criticized for their business practices in relation to the sale of Roshen's shares held by Poroshenko. According to Ukrainian media, ICU's founder and managing director, Makar Paseniuk, was hired by Poroshenko to act as his financial advisor, and oversaw the sale of Roshen.

It was later reported that ICU has utilized a series of offshore entities to conceal assets on behalf of Poroshenko, and avoid paying millions of dollars in taxes to the Ukrainian government as part of the company's sale process.

=== Banned exports to the Russian Federation ===
In July 2013, Russia banned all imports of Roshen products due to dissatisfaction with the packaging labeling. Subsequently, Roshen products underwent inspections in Kazakhstan, Belarus, Kyrgyzstan, and Moldova, but no complaints were raised. On 21 October 2013, Russia's ambassador to Ukraine Mikhail Zurabov stated, "There are no problems with the quality of products; they are safe. But there are problems associated with the production technology, using some ingredients not certified by the law." According to the 17 December 2013 Ukrainian-Russian action plan, Roshen products were expected to return to Russian stores by 1 March 2014. However, on 12 March 2014, the acting head of the Russian Federal Service for Supervision of Consumer Rights Protection and Human Welfare, Anna Popova, stated that Ukraine had not yet fulfilled its requirements to allow Roshen products back into the Russian market.

In late March 2014, the Roshen factory in Lipetsk, Russia, was closed down, and its local managing director was charged with "conspiring with unnamed others to use a registered trademark illegally to extract additional profits." Ukraine and the factory workers suspected the factory was closed because of Roshen owner Petro Poroshenko's involvement in Euromaidan and his participation in the 2014 Ukrainian presidential election. According to Reuters, some Roshen factory workers in Lipetsk felt embarrassed to work for Ukrainians "swept up in a wave of Russian patriotism since Moscow annexed Crimea" and gossiped about rumors of how the management "paid Ukrainians more money and were cheating the Russians". On 13 May 2014, Russia banned the sale of Roshen products in Crimea. In April 2017, total production stopped at the Lipetsk factory, leaving 700 people jobless.

As noted, the seizure of property of the Lipetsk confectionery factory, imposed by the Investigative Committee of the Russian Federation under a criminal case, made it impossible to sell the factory.

In February 2024, the Oktyabrsky District Court of Lipetsk decided to transfer the Lipetsk factory to the ownership of the Russian state.
