= Ukrainian oligarchs =

Businessmen who became rich from Ukrainian privatization in the 1990s

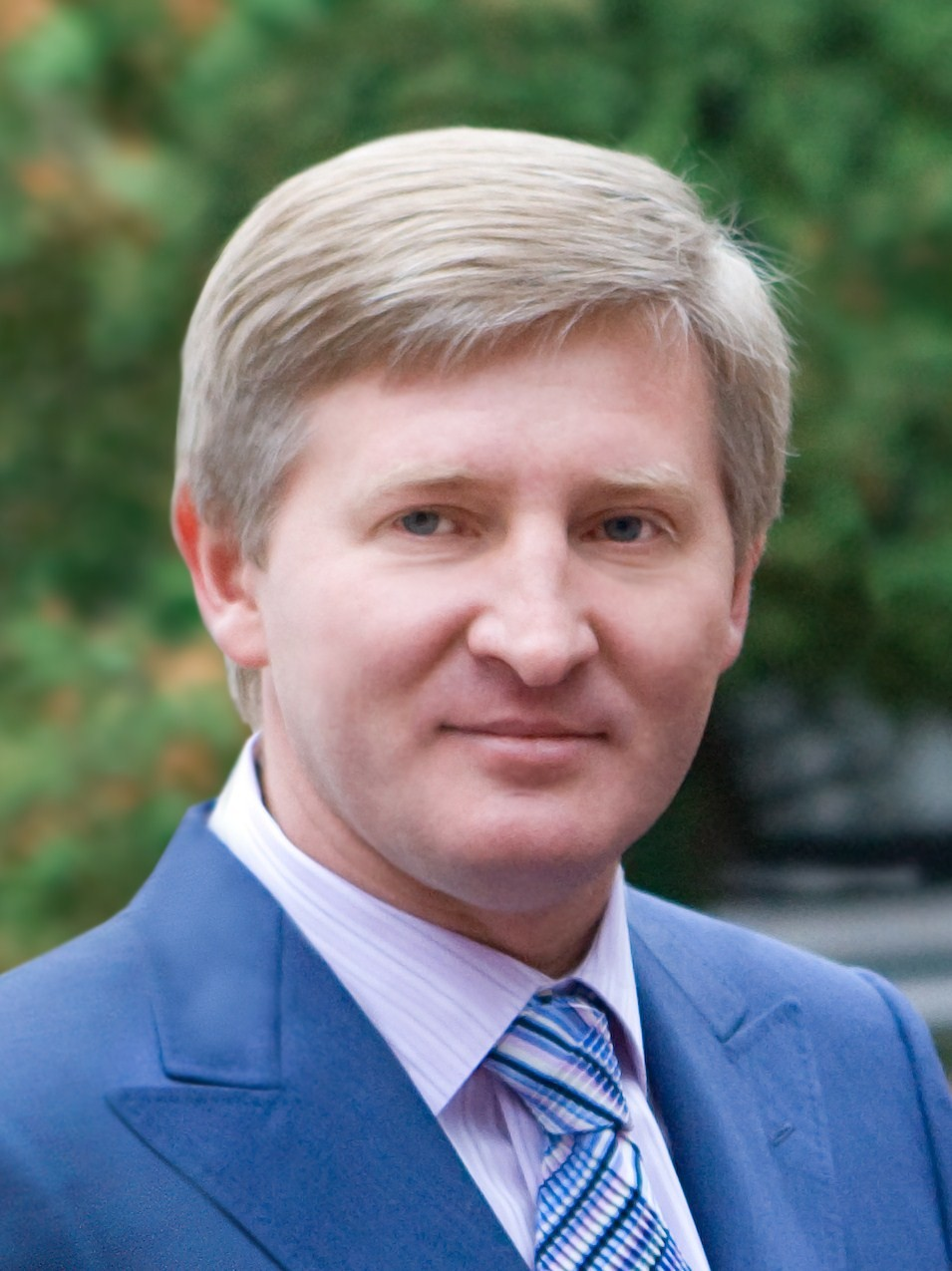
Rinat Akhmetov, one of the oligarchs of Ukraine

Ukrainian oligarchs (Ukrainian: українські олігархи, romanized: ukrayinski oliharkhy) are business oligarchs who emerged on the economic and political scene of Ukraine after the 1991 Ukrainian independence referendum. This period saw Ukraine transitioning to a market economy, with the rapid privatization of state-owned assets. Those developments mirrored those of the neighboring post-Soviet states after the dissolution of the Soviet Union. Pro-Western sources have criticised Ukraine’s lack of political reform or action against corruption, and the influence of Ukrainian oligarchs on domestic and regional politics, particularly their links to Russia.

In 2008, the combined wealth of Ukraine's 50 richest oligarchs was equal to 85% of Ukraine's GDP. In November 2013, this number was 45% (of GDP). Ukrainian GDP fell by 7% in 2014, and shrank 12% in 2015. By 2015, due to the Russo-Ukrainian War, the total net worth of the five richest and most influential Ukrainians at that time (Rinat Akhmetov, Viktor Pinchuk, Ihor Kolomoyskyi, Henadiy Boholyubov and Yuriy Kosiuk) had dropped from $21.6 billion in 2014 to $11.85 billion in June 2015. According to a research by The New Voice of Ukraine in November 2023 there were only two billionaires left in Ukraine, these being Rinat Akhmetov ($6.59 billion) and Viktor Pinchuk ($1.72 billion). In November 2022 they had counted nine billionaires. The February 2022 Russian invasion of Ukraine and its negative impact on the economy of Ukraine led to the decline in billionaires.

== Usage ==
Oligarchs were usually defined as businessmen with direct influence on both politics and the economy. During the 1990s, oligarchs emerged in Ukraine as politically-connected nouveau riche whose wealth came through ties to the corrupt — but democratically elected — government of Ukraine in its transition to a market economy. Later, numerous Ukrainian business people took control of a political party. The Party of Greens of Ukraine, Labour Ukraine and Social Democratic Party of Ukraine (united) are examples of this, while other oligarchs started new parties to gain seats and influence in the Verkhovna Rada (Ukrainian parliament).

The rise of the oligarchs has been connected to the privatization of state-owned assets, the distribution of property titles to state-owned enterprises, land, and real estate, on an equal basis to the entire population of the country, through instruments such as privatization vouchers, certificates, and coupons. Given different levels of risk-aversity, property titles were easily re-sold. Businessmen who could provide initial investment capital were able to collect these property titles and thus take control over of formerly public holdings.

Various Western nations have raised national security concerns over the oligarchic kleptocracy since the early 2000s but these gained greater salience after the 2022 Russian invasion of Ukraine raised the national security implications of a great deal of money—sourced from Ukraine or Russia but spent in the West—finding its way into matters of national security.

The oligarchs' influence on the Ukrainian government was extreme. In 2011 some analysts and Ukrainian politicians believed that some Ukrainian businesses tycoons with "lucrative relations" with Russia were deliberately hindering Ukraine's European Union integration.

In 2021 Ukraine passed a law that defined an oligarch as someone fulfilling three of the following four criteria:

- They have a fortune of $80 million (€75 million) or more;
- They exert political influence
- Own media outlets
- Have beneficial ownership of a monopoly

There is a requirement to register on the "register of oligarchs". They are then banned from financing political parties, cannot participate in the privatisation of major companies and must submit a special declaration of their income.

== List of oligarchs by wealth ==
In total, in September 2021 the top 100 wealthiest business people in Ukraine controlled around $44.5 billion, according to Forbes, 27% of Ukrainian GDP.

The top five Ukrainian oligarchs with net worth of at least $1 billion in 2024 were identified as:

rank	image	name	net worth	source	industry	reference
1		Rinat Akhmetov	$4 B	steel, coal	metals & mining	
2		Victor Pinchuk	$2 B	steel pipes, diversified	metals & mining	
3		Vadim Novinsky	$1.2 B	steel	metals & mining	
4		Kostyantin Zhevago	$1.1 B	mining	metals & mining	
5		Henadiy Boholyubov	$1 B	banking, investments	diversified	

== Chernenko study ==
An economic study by Demid Chernenko identified 35 oligarchic groups based on data points between 2002–2016:

Oligarch group	Owners (members)
System Capital Management	Rinat Akhmetov
Smart Holding	Vadym Novynskyi, Andriy Klyamko
Energy Standard	Kostiantyn Hryhoryshyn
Industrial Union of Donbas	Serhiy Taruta, Oleg Mkrtchyan, Vitaliy Haiduk
Energo	Viktor Nusenkis, Leonid Baysarov
Privat Group	Ihor Kolomoyskyi, Henadiy Boholyubov, Oleksiy Martynov
Group DF	Dmytro Firtash, Serhiy Lyovochkin, Yuriy Boyko
Universal Investment Group	Vitaliy Antonov
Azovmash	Yuriy Ivanyushchenko, Arsen Ivanyushchenko
Kernel	Andriy Verevskyi
Motor Sich	Vyacheslav Bohuslayev
Ukrprominvest/Roshen	Petro Poroshenko, Yuriy Kosiuk, Oleksiy Vadaturskyi
Nord	Valentyn Landyk
Finance and Credit	Kostyantyn Zhevago, Oleksiy Kucherenko
Astarta	Viktor Ivanchyk, Valeriy Korotkov
Dynamo	Hryhoriy Surkis, Ihor Surkis, Viktor Medvedchuk
Interpipe	Victor Pinchuk
TAS	Serhiy Tihipko
Konti/APK-Invest	Borys Kolesnikov
Obolon	Oleksandr Slobodyan
Ukrinterproduct	Oleksandr Leshchynskyi
Stirol	Mykola Yankovskyi
Creativ Group	Stanislav Berezkin
DCH (Development Construction Holding)	Oleksandr Yaroslavskyi
AVK	Volodymyr Avramenko, Valeriy Kravets
Concern AVEC	Oleksandr Feldman
Aval	Fedir Shpig
Ukrsotsbank	Valeriy Khoroshkovskyi
Pravex	Leonid Chernovetskyi and his family
Forum Group	Leonid Yurushev
Uvercon	Eduard Prutnik
Continuum	Ihor Yeremeyev, Serhiy Lahur, Stepan Ivakhiv
EpiCentre K	Oleksandr Hereha, Halyna Hereha
Cascade Investment	Vitaliy Khomutynnik
Naftohazvydobuvannia	Nestor Shufrych, Mykola Rudkovskyi

== Anti-Oligarch Law ==
In September 2021, Verkhovna Rada passed Law No. 1780-IX, aimed at reducing the disproportionate influence of wealthy individuals over politics, media, and the economy. The law defines an oligarch as someone who meets at least three of the following four criteria:

- Participates in political life
- Has significant influence over mass media
- Is the ultimate beneficiary of a monopoly
- Possesses assets exceeding ₴2.5 billion (approx. $65 million)

The law also established a formal registry of oligarchs, maintained by the National Security and Defense Council (NSDC), with legal consequences for those listed—including restrictions on financing political parties and participating in privatization.

In July 2022, Rinat Akhmetov announced his complete withdrawal from the media business. His holding company SCM transferred licenses and broadcasting rights of Media Group Ukraine (which included major TV channels like Ukraina, Ukraina 24, and Football 1/2/3) back to the state. This move eliminated one of the key criteria—media influence.

Soon after, his longtime associate Vadym Novinsky resigned from parliament, severing Akhmetov’s direct link to political life. According to Ukraine’s Minister of Justice Denys Maliuska, these actions meant Akhmetov no longer met the legal threshold to be classified as an oligarch.

== Oligarchs during Russian invasion of Ukraine ==
Following the full-scale Russian invasion of Ukraine in February 2022, the role of Ukrainian oligarchs shifted significantly. Many of the nation's wealthiest figures adopted a public, pro-Ukrainian stance and provided substantial support to the war effort.

Rinat Akhmetov, Ukraine's richest man, publicly condemned the invasion and pledged to help rebuild the country. SCM together with the Rinat Akhmetov Foundation have channeled over UAH 11.3 billion ($315 million) to help Ukraine. Similarly, former president Petro Poroshenko has leveraged his business and personal wealth to purchase and deliver military supplies, including armored vehicles, drones, and medical equipment, directly to frontline units. Viktor Pinchuk and his foundations have also provided millions in aid, focusing on medical supplies and humanitarian relief for civilians affected by the war.

In contrast, other prominent oligarchs have faced renewed legal challenges. In September 2023, Ihor Kolomoisky was arrested on charges of fraud and money laundering, a move seen as a major step in President Volodymyr Zelenskyy's campaign to combat oligarchic influence and corruption. Additionally, Dmytro Firtash, who has been fighting extradition from Austria to the United States on bribery charges since 2014, has also seen his assets within Ukraine come under legal pressure. The war has accelerated a decline in the political and economic power of these figures as the government seeks to consolidate power and reduce the influence of powerful business interests. According to Anastasia Fomitchova, the full-scale provides the authorities with the opportunity to legally overturn the balance of power with Ukraine’s main economic actors.

== See also ==
- List of Ukrainians by net worth
- Political parties in Ukraine
- Russian oligarchs
- Business magnate
- Oligarchy
- Robber baron (industrialist)
- Corruption in Ukraine
