= Volodymyr Mysyk =

Ukrainian politician and businessman (born 1965)

- Володимир Мисик
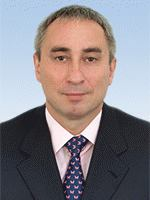
- An official portrait of him from 2012.

People's Deputy of Ukraine
- In office 12 December 2012 – 29 August 2019

Personal details
- Born: Volodymyr Yuriiovych Mysyk; 31 January 1965 (age 61) Kulynychi, Ukrainian SSR, Soviet Union
- Party: Party of Regions; People's Will
- Education: Kharkiv State Zooveterinary Academy

Volodymyr Yuriiovych Mysyk (Ukrainian: Володимир Юрійович Мисик; born 31 January 1965) is a Ukrainian politician and businessman who served as a People's Deputy of Ukraine from 2012 to 2019, representing the 7th and 8th convocation of the Verkhovna Rada as a Party of Regions and later People's Will member. As a businessman, he is also the founder of the "Kulynychi" company, a nationwide bakery and bread enterprise headquartered in Kharkiv Oblast, which he founded in 1994.

== Early life ==
Mysyk was born on 31 January 1965 in the city of Kulynychi, which was then part of the Ukrainian SSR in the Soviet Union. He has two brothers, Mikhail and Yuriy, who are part of the board of his enterprises. After graduating from secondary school, he initially pursued higher education at the Kharkiv State Zooveterinary Academy starting in 1982. However, he temporarily paused his studies in 1983 until 1985 to complete his mandatory service in the Soviet Army. After returning, he completed his degree in Kharkiv in 1989. Mysyk then became a veterinarian at the Frunze Collective Farm in Belgorod Oblast within the Russian SFSR. He returned to his hometown of Kulynychi in 1990 when he was appointed chief veterinarian of the "Ukrainka" Experimental Farm. After the collapse of the Soviet Union, he was then promoted to deputy director for Processing and Commercial Affairs at "Ukrainka", which he did until 1993.

== Business career ==
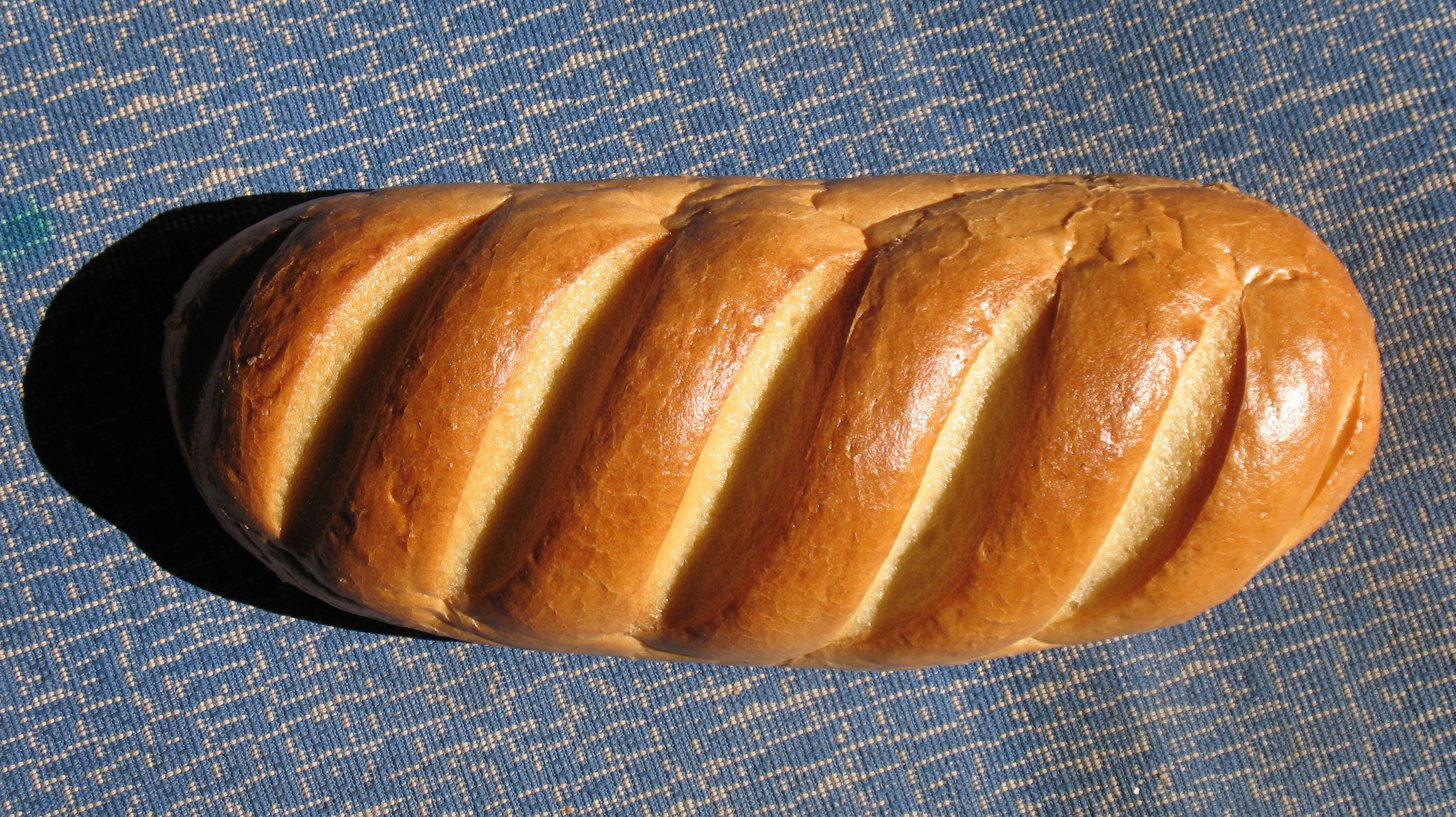
A sample of "Slobozhanskyi" baton bread produced at the Kulynychi plant in Kharkiv.

In 1993, he left farming to become a private entrepreneur during the privatisation era. A year later, he founded Khilbokombinat Kulynychi, a bakery company in his hometown, and six years later, he became head of the farming enterprise "Kegichevskoye". In 1999, he received Western investment from Slovenia through the company Gostol Gopan, which installed 14 production lines at Kulynychi for 18 million euros. The company eventually expanded to a new factory in Kharkiv in May 2006 through a cooperation agreement with Gostol Gopan, with Ukreximbank expected to provide a loan to increase production to 25 tonnes of bakery products a day at the branch in Kharkiv. By this point, he estimated Kulynychi held around 45% of the Kharkiv Oblast bread market, with other factories being opened up around the same time in the outskirts of Kharkiv while the small plants were distributed throughout the oblast. There was also one pig complex he owned through Kehychivske farm that had around 8,000 animals in 2006.

In 2011, the then Prime Minister Mykola Azarov approved the national expansion of Kulynychi across Ukraine. After this, Mysyk opened up plants of the bakery enterprise in Poltava, Kyiv, and Donetsk oblasts. He also opened a new bakery complex in Kyiv Oblast in 2012, which was described as the largest in Ukraine and one of the largest in Europe, that could process around 250 tonnes a day, and had an investment of $45 million. The complex was opened in a ceremony with Viktor Yanukovych. The complex itself was controversial, though, as some workers in Kyiv claimed this caused the shutdown of the local Kyivkhlib association of bakeries and the unemployment of its workers, which led to strikes. Kulynychi responded by saying that the company was not engaging in unfair competition and that they would employ the dismissed workers. The following year, Kulynychi, under Mysyk, invested 100 million euros in plants across the nation, with him and the "Lauffer group" under Oleksandr Leshchynskyi owning around 42% of the bread/bakery market in Ukraine. However, according to reports at the time, Mysyk did not formally own the plants because he was a deputy, despite being the CEO of the company, as they were registered under other individuals like his wife and Slovenian firms. In 2014, the company rapidly expanded again, opening up plants in Sumy, Cherkasy, Zhytomyr, and Poltava, which some said was due to its connections with Azarov and local authorities. In 2016, Mysyk said that Kulynychi had joined an international bakery-industry association, and that the company was still partnered with firms in Slovenia.

In 2022, Mysyk relocated some of the factories of Kulynychi from Kharkiv due to the Russian invasion of Ukraine, although he would later deny this. Simultaneously, the company began building a large bakery complex near Obroshyne in Lviv Oblast, with a promise of 3,000 new jobs for the local community there and 20 million euros of investment. The large complex was set to be around 15,000 square metres with eight lines, and was slated to open in April 2023. However, while the complex was being created, local deputy Mykhailo Bondar questioned Mysyk and Kulynychi, and called on law-enforcement bodies to check whether the building had a permit and whether it was using large amounts of electricity from the community. He also accused Mysyk of having ties with Russia. The governor of the oblast, Maksym Kozytskyi, rersponded by saying that such suspicions should go to law enforcement.

== Political career ==
Mysyk joined the Party of Regions in 2006, although the first time he ran in national politics was in 2012 during the 2012 Ukrainian parliamentary elections. That year, he ran in constituency No. 172 (Kharkiv, Kharkiv Oblast) representing the Party of Regions. He was elected with 51.97% of the vote, a majority, against 7 other opponents to the Rada. His closest opponent was Vitaly Prylypko, who won 20.60% of the vote. During his election campaign, he focused on economic and social development alongside education and medicine improvement, among other things. His nomination was supported by two local Kharkiv politicians, Mikhail Dobkin and Hennadiy Kernes, with Mysyk sometimes being called part of the "Dobkin-Kernes group" in 2012. Upon entering the Rada, he joined the parliamentary faction of the Party of Regions, and was appointed Chair of the Subcommittee on the Activities and Organisation of Prosecutorial Bodies in December. In the 7th convocation, he was accused of button pushing by Chesno multiple times, with Mykola Dmytruk voting for Mysyk in absentia once. He also voted for the so-called "laws on dictatorship" which significantly curbed the rights to protest and free speech in response to Euromaidan. Due to this, some outlets accused him of actively backing Viktor Yanukovych, although he eventually left the Party of Regions in late 2014. Upon leaving the party, he spent the remainder of his mandate with the "Economic Development" group.

Mysyk was re-elected during the snap 2014 Ukrainian parliamentary elections, where he ran in the same constituency but as an independent candidate. He received 54.34% of the vote against 10 other opponents, and upon joining the Rada again, he retained his post as Chair of the Subcommittee on the Activities of Prosecutorial Bodies. He remained an independent until late 2019, when he joined the pro-Russian Revival. During the 8th convocation, he secured an amendment to the state budget for 2016, which delayed the introduction of electronic asset declarations for officials until 2017, although this was against requirements set by the European Union. He was also widely reported on in 2018 due to what were widely considered to be misogynistic comments made against a female deputy, Viktoria Ptashnyk. During a meeting of the Committee on Law Enforcement, he said to Ptashnyk that he was responsible "for the fact that feminism will not pass here" and also added that women bring "great confusion to our male team" because the committee was all-male at the time. He received widespread backlash on social media due to these comments, with deputy Andriy Kozhemiakin attacking the comments and criticising the members of the committee for not speaking up to defend Ptashnyk. Mysyk also proposed later that year a naming law that prohibited certain names that could "offend public morality" or be the reason for insults and bullying. Upon the end of his second mandate in 2019, he attempted to run again in the 2019 Ukrainian parliamentary elections, but as a self-nominee. He was not selected, as he narrowly lost with 43.17% of the vote to the 43.61% of the chosen deputy, Yuriy Zdebskyi of the Servant of the People party, in one of the narrower elections of the election season.

== Personal life ==
He is married and has a daughter and two sons. In 2012, he was ranked the 196th richest person in Ukraine with a net worth of $28.6 million.

== Honours and awards ==
Mysyk has been awarded the following honours:

- Honoured Worker of Agriculture in Ukraine (2004)
- State Prize of Ukraine in Science and Technology (2012)
- Honorary citizen of Kharkiv (2017)
