= Stanislav Berezkin =

Ukrainian politician and businessman (born 1959-2020)

- Станіслав Березкін
- An official portrait of him from 2014.

People's Deputy of Ukraine
- In office 14 February 2011 – 29 August 2019

Personal details
- Born: Stanislav Semenovich Berezkin; 12 May 1959 (age 67) Vysoki Bairaky, Ukrainian SSR, Soviet Union (now Ukraine)
- Died: 6 December 2020 (aged 61) Kyiv, Ukraine
- Party: Yulia Tymoshenko Bloc (2011); Party of Regions (2012-14); Revival(2014-18); People's Will (2018-19)
- Education: Central Ukrainian National Technical University

Stanislav Semenovich Berezkin (Ukrainian: Станіслав Березкін; 12 May 1959-6 December 2020) was a Ukrainian politician, oligarch, and businessman. Berezkin served as a People's Deputy of Ukraine in the Verkhovna Rada from 2011 to 2019. As an oligarch, he was the chairman of the Creative Group, an agro-industrial company based in the city of Kropyvnytskyi, from 2006 until his death.

== Early life ==
Berezkin was born on 12 May 1959 in the small village of Vysoki Bairaky, which was then part of the Ukrainian SSR in the Soviet Union. When he was a teenager, at 17, he started leading an aviation club at the Kirovohrad Regional Station of Young Technicians. After graduating from secondary school in 1977, he completed his mandatory service in the Soviet Army, eventually leaving the army in 1979. In 1983, he first entered the workforce by working at the Central Ukrainian National Technical University (then the Kirovohrad Institute of Agricultural Engineering) in Kropyvnytskyi (then Kirovohrad). After the collapse of the Soviet Union, he started working at AST "Inhul" in 1992, before joining MP "Sistema" in 1993. He continued working at Sistema, which was variously renamed over the years, for three years, until 1996.

== Business career and Creative Group ==
In 1996, he took on his first senior business role after leaving Sistema, becoming chairman of the supervisory board of "Sonola" until 2000. Sonola was a small oil-extraction plant company that he founded in the oblast with a loan of $1.2 million from the European Bank of Reconstruction and Development. The Western NIS Enterprise Fund (WNISEF) also funded Sonola with $3.2 million to build a new oil point at the end of 1996. However, Berezkin quickly came into dispute with WNISEF after he refused to repay a loan in January 1998, which had been invalidated, with the representatives of WNISEF being removed from Sonola in 2000. The dispute would eventually make its way to the International Centre for Settlement of Investment Disputes and to a case in a New York court. In 2000, he returned to "Sistema", becoming CEO there until 2006. While at Sistema, in 2002 he first became involved with the Creative Group, helping form its management company under Yurii Davydov in which he was tasked with financing new plants. He left Sistema in 2006 when he was appointed chairman of the Creative Group.

=== Creative Group ===
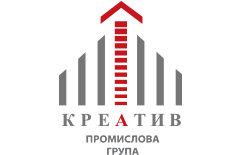
Creative Group's logo in 2014.

In 2006, Berezkin became CEO of the Creative Group while Davydov was chairman of the board and received 11% of the shares. At the time, Berezkin was not heavily involved with Creative, as he spent more time in politics. After a November 2007 deal where investors bought 23.4% of Creative for $30 million, Berezkin mostly withdrew from his duties at Creative, with his son Maksym becoming general director, although Maksym kept the title of CEO. Under Maksym, production rapidly expanded with the funding of a new soy-processing plant in 2012, which led to the agreement of a $300 million loan from a foreign bank. State banks held the majority of the loans, mostly Oschadbank. In 2014, Davydov left Creative after the company started going on a downturn track and nearly stopping production. Due to this, two businessmen, Artur Hrants and Rysbek Toktomushev, bought many of the plants from Creative for $25 million and assets. Maksym also left the company during this time to handle other assets, which formed a new company called GreenStone, which Stanislav had nothing to do with.

After Stanislav once again took on many of the responsibilities at Creative, the two businessmen accused Creative of falsifying financial statements and fraud, which led to bankruptcy proceedings in early June 2016. Due to this, in 2018, prosecutors attempted to lift the parliamentary immunity that Berezkin had over alleged misuse of the Oschadbank loan. The Verkhovna Rada eventually voted against this, with 160 deputies voting "for" against the 226 needed. Berezkin then commented on the loan, calling it ordinary business.

== Political career ==
In 1998, he first entered politics, becoming a deputy of the Kirovohrad Oblast Council. He left this post in 2002 during an attempt to run in the 2002 Ukrainian parliamentary election in constituency no. 99 as an independent, although he was technically a member of Labor Ukraine. He was not selected. Due to this, he instead became a member of the executive committee of the Kropyvnytskyi City Council a year later, in 2003. He tried again to enter the Rada in 2006, this time on the party list at no. 256 of the Yulia Tymoshenko Bloc, but was also not selected again. He was successful five years later, in 2011, during a by-election when he was no. 178 on Tymoshenko's list. After entering the Rada, he initially stayed with Tymoshenko's bloc before defecting to the Party of Regions faction in February 2011. He was fully elected during the 2012 Ukrainian parliamentary elections during the 7th convocation for constituency No. 100 (Kirovohrad Oblast), winning 36.88% of the vote against 10 other opponents while representing the Party of Regions. After leaving the Party of Regions in 2014 during Euromaidan, he joined the deputy group "Economic Development", and re-ran in the snap 2014 Ukrainian parliamentary elections in constituency No. 100 as a non-partisan candidate and was elected. After joining the Rada again, he initially became a member of Revival, which he stayed as a member of until 2018 when he defected to People's Will. In the 2019 Ukrainian parliamentary election, he sought another mandate in constituency No. 100 against Vladimir Dukhno. During the election, he alleged that Dukhno participated in a pre-election event in which Berezkin suffered. Berezkin was ultimately not elected.

Politically, Berezkin was mostly focused on promoting the agricultural sector of Ukraine. He also advocated for the rural areas of Ukraine and said that the Rada must build roads and routes to support rural schools and agricultural lands. He also proposed creating a coalition in the Rada to "protect rural communities." He also voted in favour of petitions to abolish the article in the Criminal Code of Ukraine on illegal enrichment, which obligated members of the parliament to give explanations about the sources of their income, despite being one of Ukraine's obligations to the IMF and European Union. In addition, while a member of the Party of Regions, he voted for the so-called "laws on dictatorship" that cracked down on people's right to protest and free speech in response to the then-ongoing Euromaidan. Berzkin, after the outbreak of the War in the Donbas, said he was "ready to defend Kirovohrad and Kirovohrad Oblast" and called for the creation of a people's squad to protect the city.

== Personal life ==
He was married and had two children, Maksym and Victoria. Stanislav died on 6 December 2020 at 61 years old in Kyiv. He died due to a detached blood clot. His funeral was held three days later, on 9 December, in Kropyvnytskyi, with an additional memorial service also held in Kyiv at the Church of the Life-Giving Spring. He was buried at the Far Eastern Cemetery in Kropyvnytskyi.

=== Assassination attempt ===
In late December 2012, Berezkin was sent a homemade bomb to his office at Creative, which contained about 300 grams of explosives, according to Hennadiy Moskal, although it was found suspicious by Berezkin, and he ordered it away, with it later being defused by police officers. An unknown person, prior to the attack, had called Berezkin, telling him there was an "urgent parcel" that needed to be picked up. A former employee of the Security Service of Ukraine, Andriy Dyachenko, was later accused of involvement in the attack and was sentenced to 11 years in prison by the Kirovsky District Court in November 2013. Dyachenko was accused of plotting the attack after Berezkin requested that a plot of land, which was owned by Andriy's brother, Pavlo, be investigated, with the land later being returned to the city after it was found that it was obtained with the help of forged documents.

== Honours and awards ==
Berezkin was awarded the following honours:

- Honoured Worker of the Industry of Ukraine
- Knight of the Order of Prince Volodymyr, II degree
- Certificate of Honour of the Verkhovna Rada
