= List of Ukrainians by net worth =

This is a list of Ukrainian billionaires based on an annual assessment of wealth and assets compiled and published by Forbes magazine in 2025, as well as the real-time billionaires list as of April 2025.

image	rank	name	net worth	age	country/territory	source of wealth	reference
	390	Rinat Akhmetov	$7.9 B	58	Ukraine	SCM Holdings	
	1,141	Victor Pinchuk	$3.2 B	64	Ukraine	Interpipe Group, EastOne Group	
	1,947	Petro Poroshenko	$1.8 B	59	Ukraine	Roshen, Kuznia na Rybalskomu, 5 Kanal	
	2,356	Andriy Verevskyi	$1.4 B	50	Ukraine	Kernel Holding	
	2,623	Vadim Novinsky	$1.2 B	61	Ukraine	Smart Holding	
	2,623	Kostyantin Zhevago	$1.2 B	51	Ukraine	Ferrexpo, Ukrnafta	
	2,623	Vlad Yatsenko	$1.2 B	41	Ukraine United Kingdom	Revolut	
