= Epicentr K =

Home improvement hypermarket chain in Ukraine

Coordinates: 50°29′12″N 30°36′34″E

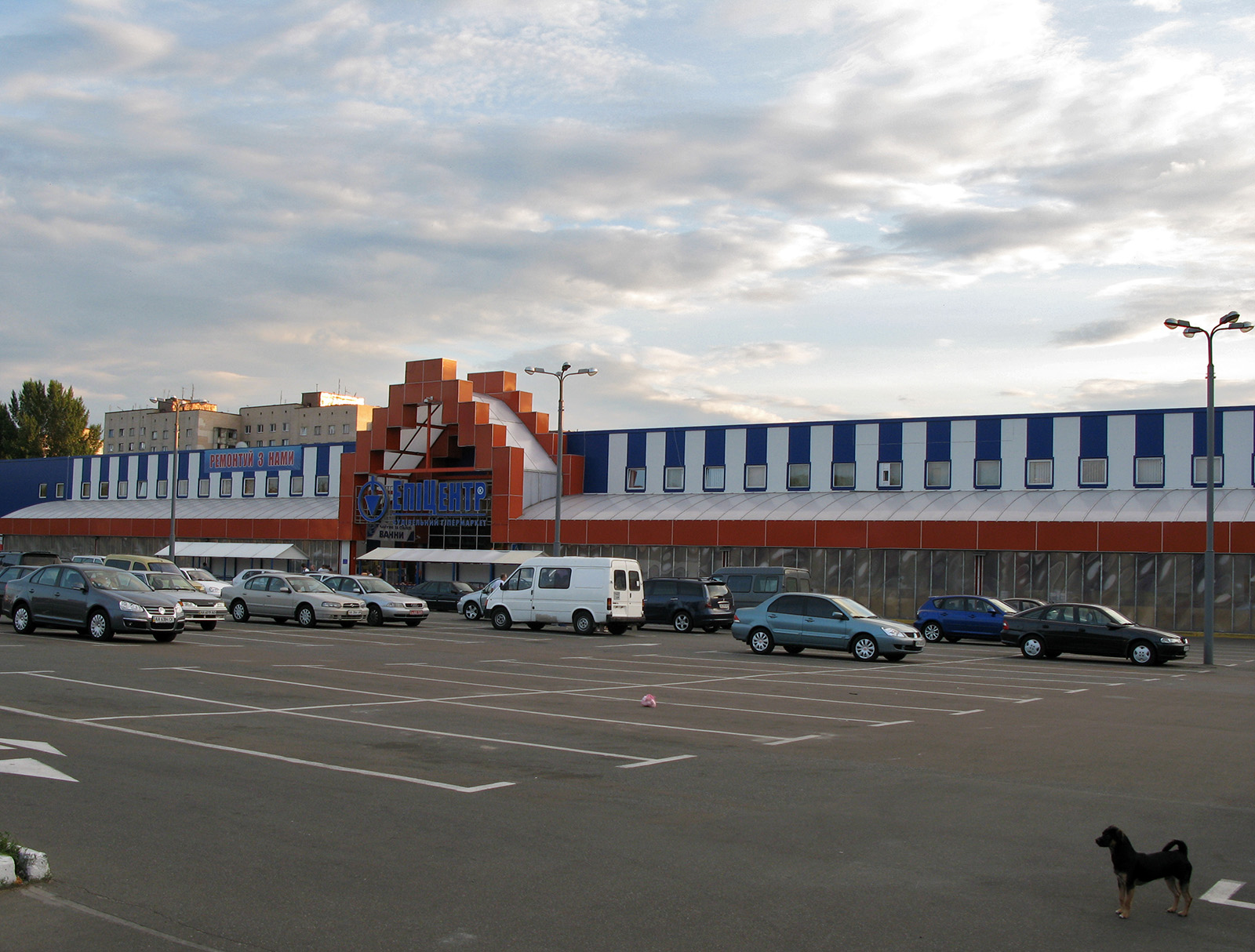
- Epicentr K mall in Kyiv
- Native name: Епіцентр К
- Romanized name: Epitsentr K
- Type: Private
- Industry: Retail
- Founded: August 27, 2003; 23 years ago in Kyiv, Ukraine
- Founders: Oleksandr Hereha; Halyna Hereha
- Headquarters: 6K Berkovetska Street, Kyiv, Ukraine
- Key people: Petro Mykhailyshyn; Tetiana Surzhyk
- Products: gardening, metal/wood, plumbing, tools, decor, flooring, electronics, construction materials
- Website: epicentrk.ua

Epicentr K (Ukrainian: Епіцентр К) is a home improvement hypermarket chain in Ukraine. The company is one of the first in the country to introduce hardware stores and remains the leader in this category.

Epicentr was the first in Ukraine to come up with wholesale stores in Ukraine, with their hypermarkets being heavily inspired by French retailer Castorama. As of 2023 the company had opened 75 stores nationwide. The company carries a collection of awards such as "The Brand of the Year" (2008).

== History ==
In 1994 Oleksandr Hereha and his wife Halyna began to sell the tiles from Poland at markets. In 1996 they've founded the Cermet AGS company and opened a tile store in Kyiv. In 2001 following the experience of Castorama's Polish chain it was decided to build a big hardware hypermarket. The Epicentr name was suggested by one of the sellers and a K letter was added as a short for команда, a team in Ukrainian.

The first Epicentr K was built in 2003 in Kyiv on Viskozna Street with help of Polish experts. The opening was scheduled 6 December at 10:00 however the heating could only be conducted at 3 AM and the ceremony only took place due to the warm weather that winter. Epicentr had been one of the several chains that introduced a hypermarket format to Ukrainians that year.

In 2005 the company opened three more stores, on Bratyslavska Street, on Kiltseva Road and on Petra Hryhorenka Avenue, the latter two were situated next to Metro Cash&Carry stores.

In 2006 it was decided to expand the business to other regions, the first hypermarket outside of Kyiv was opened in Lviv, alongside it the company built the stores in Poltava and Odesa.

In 2007, eight stores were built nationwide including ones in Ivano-Frankivsk, Dnipropetrovsk, Kharkiv, Khmelnytskyi and Kryvyi Rih (Dnipropetrovsk Oblast), the latter one was the first one to be situated outside the regional center, it had been built in 76 days.

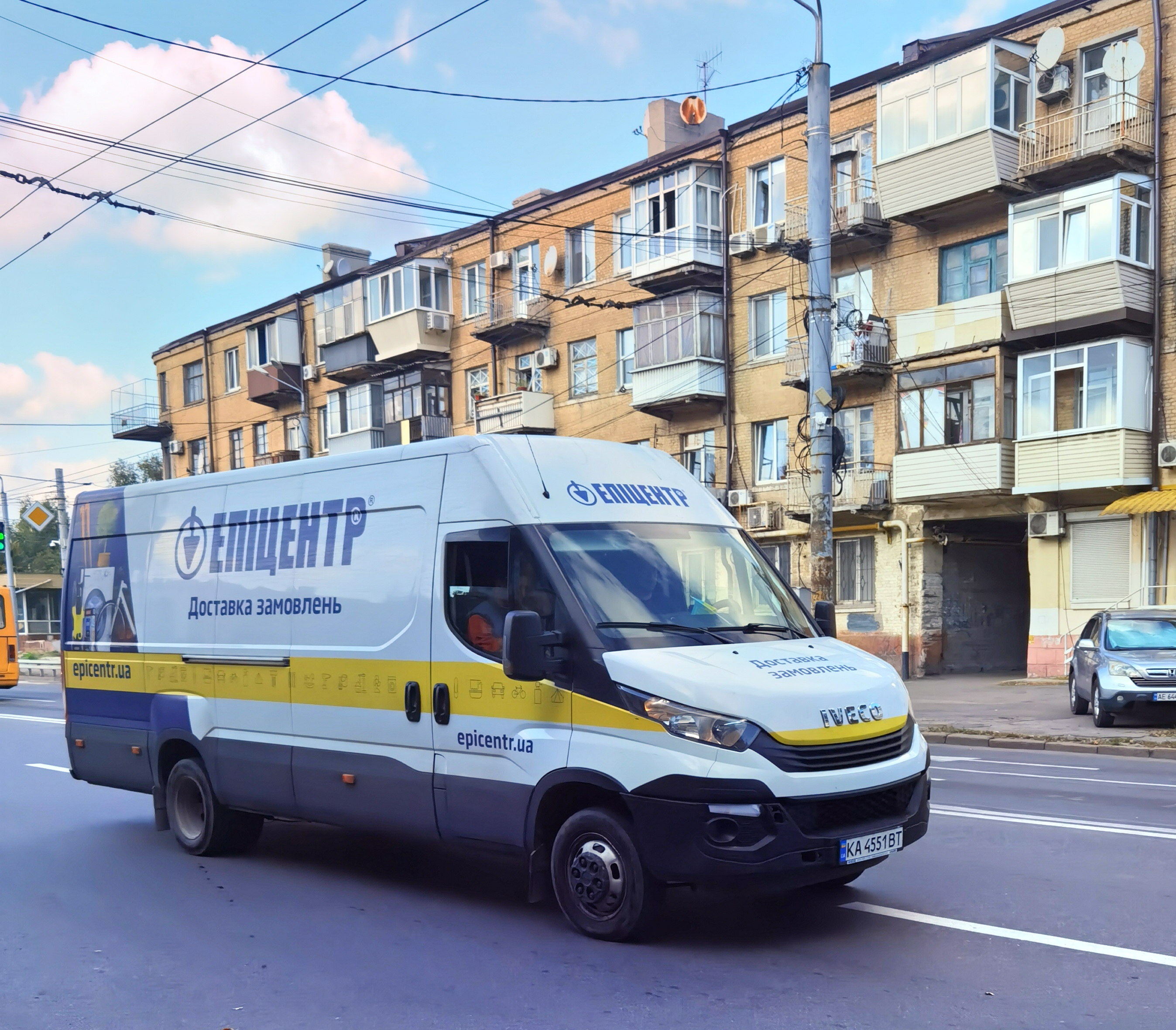
Delivery van of Epicentr in Dnipro

As of 2008, there were 16 stores built with eight more projected. New malls had been built in Rivne, Ternopil, Kharkiv and Chernivtsi. In 2008 an Epicentr Sports Club had been opened in Horodok, Khmelnytskyi Oblast.

In 2009, the company expanded its offerings to include consumer goods in addition to building materials. That year malls were opened in Uzhhorod, Lviv, Odesa, Luhansk, Cherkasy and Petropavlivska Borshchahivka (Kyiv Oblast).

On 11 December 2009 the company opened 56,000 square metres (600,000 ft^{2}) store on Berkovetska Street in Kyiv, the largest of its kind in Ukraine, the building also served as a company's main office. The opening ceremony was held by Viktor Yushchenko, the President of Ukraine at the time.

The peak of company's extension was in 2010–2013, 8-9 stores were opening each year.

In 2010 the new malls in Lutsk, Vinnytsia and Zaporizhzhia were opened.

In 2011 the chain had opened their 30th store, it was built in Mukachevo, Zakarpattia Oblast. Also the new malls were built in Kirovohrad, Luhansk and Kamianets-Podilskyi (Khmelnytskyi Oblast).

In 2012 the 40th Epicentr K was opened in Stryi, Lviv Oblast the Epicentr hypermarkets were opened in Dnipropetrovsk, Simferopol, Kherson, Mariupol and Horlivka (Donetsk Oblast).

In October 2013 Epicentr K acquired the controlling stake of Nova Liniia hardware store chain. The new malls were opened in Dniprodzerzhynsk (Dnipropetrovsk Oblast), Kolomyia (Ivano-Frankivska Oblast) and Donetsk. Also that year Epicentr bought the logistic complex in Kalynivka, Kyiv Oblast, it was reconstructed in 2015.

In 2014 Epicentr K began its format transition from hardware hypermarkets to modern malls, in December the company opened the 105,000 square metres (1,130,000 ft^{2}) hypermarket, at 20 Polyarna Street in Kyiv. The store is recognized as "The World's Largest Trading Center of DIY format" by the Book of Records of Ukraine, surpassing their previous record set in 2009. Also new malls had been opened in Brovary (Kyiv Oblast) and Sumy.

In September 2015 Intersport sports goods company became a partner of Epicentr opening their first Ukrainian stores in the hardware malls.

In 2015 the hypermarket chain had bought a closed Alta Center mall in Kyiv and began expanding it. The reconstructed mall was reopened as Epicentr K in March 2018. Also the company had opened an Epicentr Sports Complex in Khmelnytskyi and Kamianets-Podilskyi (Khmelnytskyi Oblast).

In July 2016 Epicentr K acquired the control stake of Vinnytsia Agrarian Holding which owns 50 000 ha of land.

In 2016 Epicentr opened their online store called 27.ua. Pick-up points began to open in various cities, the first Epicentr in Kyiv, opened back in 2003, was reconstructed into pick-up point as well. Also new malls were built in Bila Tserkva (Kyiv Oblast) and Dubno (Rivne Oblast).

In 2017 Epicentr K opened their smallest mall size of which is 3500 m^{2}, it is located in Shepetivka, Khmelnytskyi Oblast. Also a new mall was built in Uman, Cherkasy Oblast.

In 2018 the company planned to increase the total number of the stores to 53, opening new malls in Mykolaiv, Odesa and Slavuta (Khmelnytskyi Oblast).

At Retail & Development Business Awards 2018 Epicentr K received the Best Homeware Retailer award from Retail Association of Ukraine.

In March 2019 the company had bought an unfinished Arsen supermarket in Chervonohrad, Lviv Oblast, and rebuilt it into one of Epicentr K stores. In December an Epicentr was opened in former Nova Liniia hypermarket in Boryspil, Kyiv Oblast. Also the chain had built a new malls in Kovel, Novovolynsk (Volyn Oblast), Kramatorsk (Donetsk Oblast), Khust (Zakarpattia Oblast), Boiarka (Kyiv Oblast), Starokostiantyniv (Khmelnytskyi Oblast) and Pryluky (Chernihiv Oblast).

In 2019, the agrarian operations of Epicenter K expanded after its owners purchased 1,364 hectares.

In December 2019 27.ua website changed its domain to epicentrk.ua and became a marketplace next year.

In February 2020 Epicentr Agro acquired Svarog West Group in Khmelnytskyi Oblast.

In 2020 Epicentr K signed deals with 4F and The Athlete's Foot to open their stores in Ukraine. Also the company had bought the Modul mall in Bucha, Kyiv Oblast, and reconstructed it into one of their hypermarkets. New malls in Vinnytsia, Zaporizhzhia, Melitopol (Zaporizhzhia Oblast) and Kalush (Ivano-Frankivsk Oblast) were opened.

In 2021 Epicentr Ceramic Corporation plant was opened in Kalynivka, Kyiv Oblast.

In October 2021 Epicentr K had opened their first mall-in-mall format store in Kyiv's Blockbuster Mall, the size of hypermarket was 27 000 m^{2} and it was a first Epicentr to be opened in a rented space instead of a standalone building. Also new malls had been opened in Nikopol (Dnipropetrovsk Oblast), Mykolaiv and Pervomaisk (Mykolaiv Oblast), alongside them a former Nova Liniia store in Kherson had been reconstructed into Epicentr.

=== Russo-Ukrainian war (2022–present) ===
Epicenter K in Mariupol

During the Russian invasion of Ukraine, the Epicenter K in Mariupol suffered significant damage during a mass bombing on 2 March as part of the Siege of Mariupol.

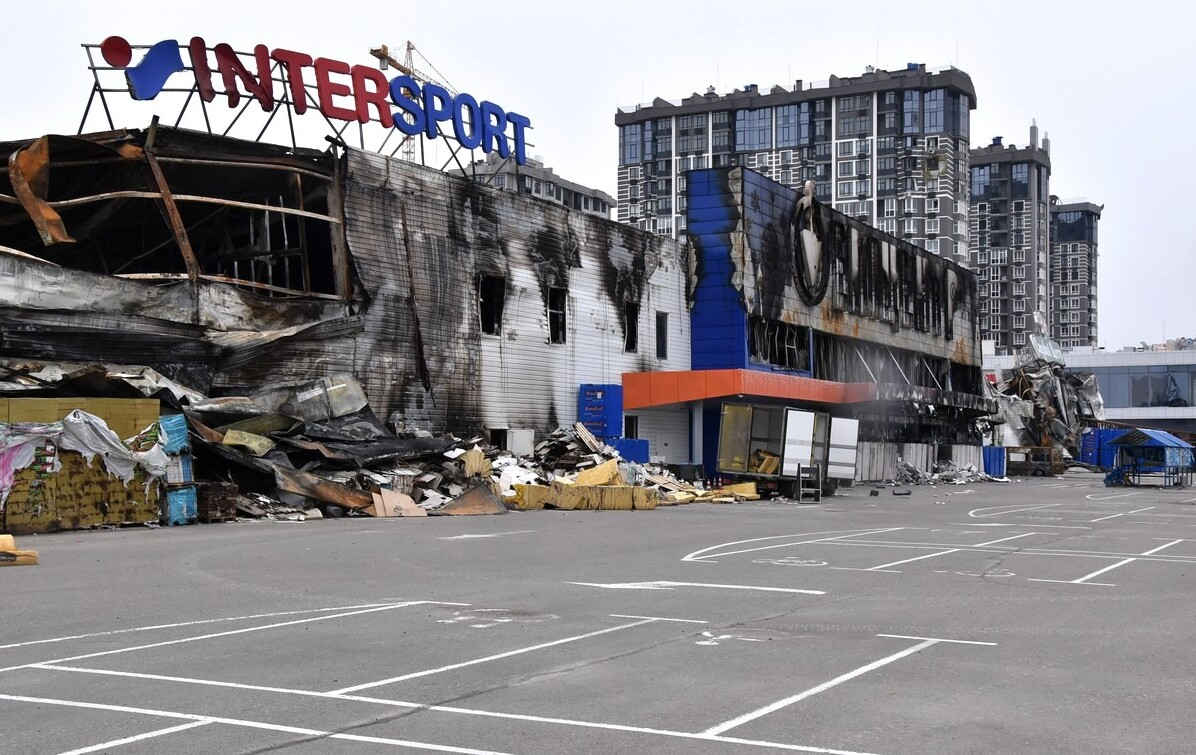
Burned out Epicenter K shopping mall in Bucha after the battle for the city.

In September 2022 (6 months after the onset of the full-scale Russian invasion of Ukraine) Epicenter K had opened a 'brave format' three-floor mall in Lviv, where the first floor is a hardware hypermarket, the second floor is a shopping and entertainment center and the third floor is rented out. The mall's size is almost 90, 000 m^{2}. Also new malls had been opened in Kyiv and Kharkiv.

On May 25, 2024, the mall in Kharkiv was hit and destroyed by Russian glide bombs. Eighteen civilians were killed.

In spring of 2025, independent estimates suggested that company's losses as a result of the war could be as high as US1$ billion. The amount of malls operated by the company dropped from 80 in 2021 to 70 in 2026.

According to the company's management, 10 of its shopping malls in Mariupol, Chernihiv, Bucha, Nikopol, Kharkiv, Kamianske, Kherson, Sumy and Kryvyi Rih had been destroyed and 13 had been damaged by Russian forces as of August 2026. Two logistic centers in Kyiv were also destroyed. Melitopol shopping mall came under Russian occupation.

On August 24, 2026, Russian forces struck and destroyed two Epicenter shopping malls in Odesa.

== Stores ==
Each store has a large overflow and free parking, as well as a cafe and a bank. The company offers a possibility of custom design on a wide selection of its products as well as delivery and an express delivery.

== Contributions ==
The company also helps with the construction of the Kyivan Spiritual Academy and participates in a wide variety of sponsorship throughout the country: Gert Goff show commemorated to 750-year anniversary of Lviv, jubilee concerts of Pavlo Zibrov and Valentyna Stepova, and many others.

=== Sport ===
In 2008, the company became the title sponsor of the Ukrainian Premier League in football.

For some period, the company was a sponsor of the Ukraine national football team (Ukrainian Association of Football).

Starting in 2019 the company's sponsorship made possible for one of the Ukrainian provincial football clubs from Dunaivtsi organize into a competitive collective and participate in football competitions at national level (FC Epitsentr Dunaivtsi).

== Incidents ==
9 September 2017 Epicentr K warehouses in Lviv caught fire. Approximately 30 m^{2} of space burned down because of fire at the plumbing rack.

2 September 2021 at 12:58 in Pervomaisk a man with an axe and a knife came to one of Epicentr K stores and spilled the flammables. Mall's security tried to stop him but he struck one of them with an axe, set the fire and ran away, they've chased them down in the yards but began to fight and wounded another guard. Meanwhile over 1000 m² of space were on fire, it was localized at 14:20 and liquidated at 18:30. February 4 police had caught the man and arrested him for 60 days.
