= Volodymyr Avramenko (businessman) =

Ukrainian politician and businessman (born 1959)

- Володимир Авраменко
- A portrait of him from 2020.

People's Deputy of Ukraine
- In office 31 March 2002 – 25 May 2006

Personal details
- Born: Volodymyr Fedorovych Avramenko; 18 April 1959 (age 67) Khrestivka, Ukrainian SSR, Soviet Union (now Ukraine)
- Party: For United Ukraine! Party of Regions
- Education: Donetsk National University of Economics and Trade named after M. Tugan-Baranovsky

Volodymyr Fedorovych Avramenko (Ukrainian: Володимир Авраменко; born 18 April 1959) is a Ukrainian politician, oligarch, and businessman. Avramenko served as a People's Deputy of Ukraine in the Verkhovna Rada representing the Party of Regions during the 4th convocation from 2002 to 2006. He is also the founder of AVK (АВК), which is a manufacturer of candies, in particular chocolates, and an investor in and sometimes considered the founder of EasyPay. He is also the director of some smaller enterprises, such as Troyanda and Polyus. He is considered an oligarch due to the scale of his business holdings, particularly of AVK.

== Early life ==
Avramenko was born on 18 April 1959 in the city of Khrestivka, which was then part of the Ukrainian SSR in the Soviet Union. After graduating from secondary school, he immediately decided to pursue higher education, graduating from the Donetsk National University of Economics and Trade named after M. Tugan-Baranovsky with a specialisation in mechanical engineering of machines. He then entered the workforce for a year, working at Store No. 1 and Store No. 12 in the city of Odesa. However, he left for a year to complete his mandatory military service in the Soviet Army. After returning to Ukraine, he moved to Donetsk and began working at the "Bilyi Lybid" shopping centre, becoming head of the centre there until he left in 1987. Avramenko then briefly entered politics until 1990, becoming an instructor at the Organisational Department of the Donetsk City Committee, and later also its head. In 1990, he left this post and became Head of Department No. 14 at the "Inzhener" complex in Donetsk, which he did until the collapse of the Soviet Union.

== Business activities ==
=== AVK ===
AVK's logo in 2021.

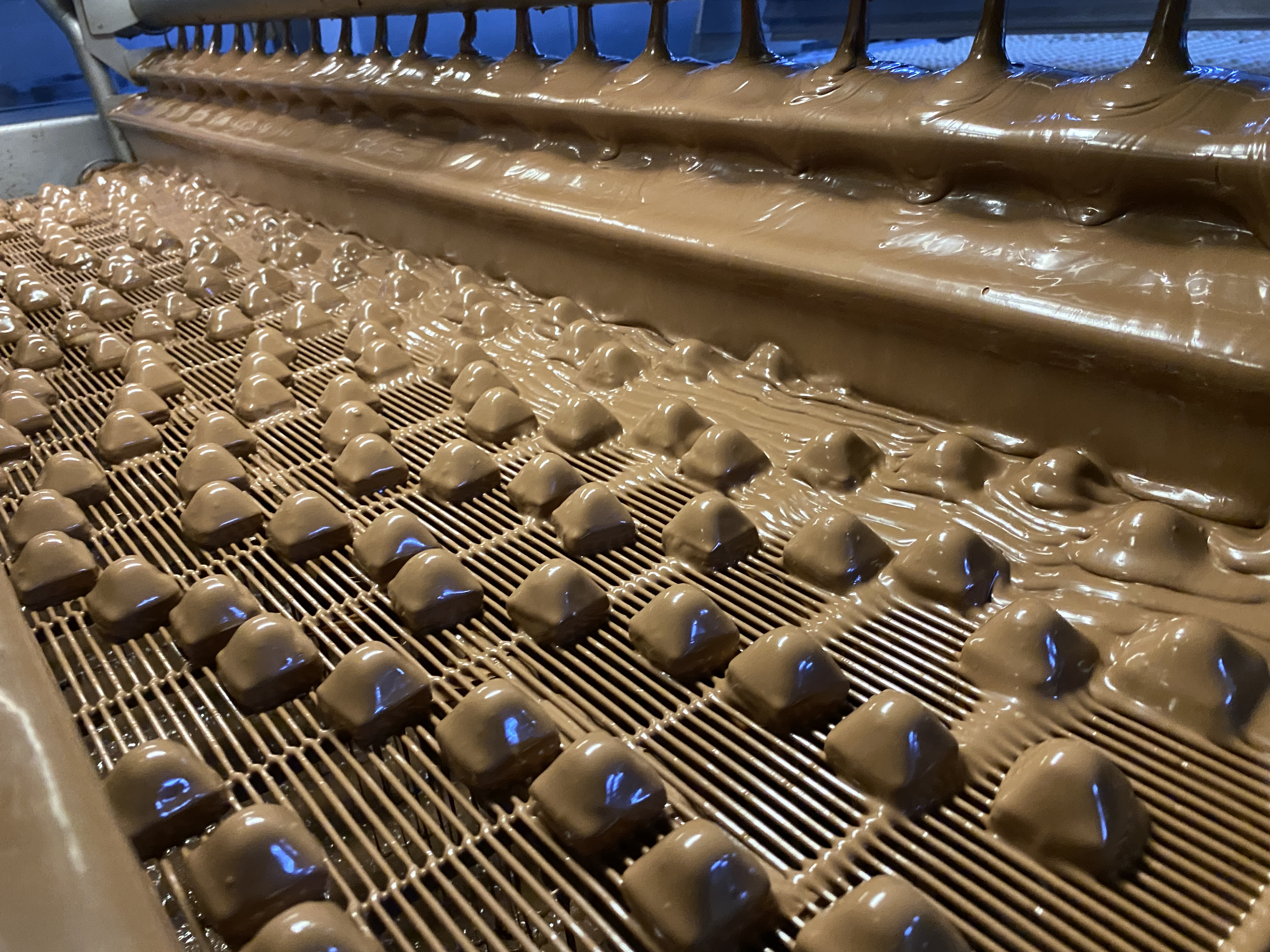
Production of AVK chocolates in a factory in 2021.

Avramenko founded AVK, a confectionery company, on 22 October 1991 in Donetsk. When he founded the company, it initially only supplied cocoa beans to larger confectionery factories in Ukraine, until AVK eventually began producing its own sweets too. Avramenko said that in its early years AVK held nearly the whole chocolate market, since other large enterprises like Roshen would not be founded until later. He eventually led AVK in expanding its production to other grain snacks and other types of chocolates in the early 1990s. He briefly left the company in 1995-98, when he became chairman and director of the "Donetsk Confectionary Factory", which was eventually folded into AVK, while AVK itself became the second-largest Ukrainian confectionery brand and created its own concern in 1998. After returning to direct AVK in 1998, he led the company in building a new factory in Donetsk and certifying the brand, while the Western NIS Enterprise Fund (WNISEF) invested in the business in 1999. AVK later bought back 25% of the shares from WINISEF in 2013 for $45 million. Avramenko eventually left AVK again in 2000, handing over ownership to co-owner Valeriy Kravets.

Avramenko returned to becoming director and co-owner of AVK in 2014, shortly before the War in the Donbas. Due to the war, Avramenko shut down its Luhansk (2014) and Donetsk (2015) factories, while most of the company's production was relocated to Kyiv and Dnipro, although it maintained other sites in Rivne, Poltava, and the Czech Republic. The assets in the Donbas were mothballed. The Donetsk factory was reportedly illegally being used by the company "Lakond", which branded its products as AVK, although it was not related to AVK. By 2016, AVK started exporting to the European Union, and opened up stores in Dnipro after the company was consolidated there. Avramenko also founded the plant-based meat company Dremeat and the Brunch grain snack, which were part of AVK. However, the company was still in bankruptcy due to most of the creditors being from Russia and because nobody would invest in the company since most of its assets were left behind in the Donbas. In 2019, due to a court ruling, Prominvestbank won an order to recover AVK's factory in Dnipro over debt. In July 2021, the parent company PrAT AVK was declared bankrupt by Avramenko, and liquidation proceedings started, which, in statements, the company blamed on Russia and court orders by Sberbank. In 2025, the main factory in Dnipro was sold to a Kyiv-based company.

=== EasyPay ===
EasyPay's logo in 2020.

Avramenko was either the first investor in EasyPay, which was said to have been founded by his son Oleksii in 2007, or the founder of EasyPay, according to different sources. EasyPay was created on the basis of EasySoft, and was based on payment terminals in Moscow. The company was said to be the first non-bank payment system in Ukraine, and was the first in mobile commerce for Kyivstar. Volodymyr himself was said to be the majority owner in 2015, although in 2026 the parent company behind EasyPay was LLC "FK Kontraktovyi Dim", which was reported to be co-owned by Volodymyr's sons, Oleksii and Anton. In 2015, Volodymyr also bought 72% of the shares of PJSC Bank "Trust", which partnered with EasyBank on cards, which was a small bank previously worth 563 million hryvnias. In 2016, the bank was declared insolvent due to the majority of borrowers being from Russian-occupied areas in Ukraine, who did not service their loans.

=== Other businesses ===
From 2000 to 2002 he was Director of Troyanda, a company based in Kyiv. Troyanda is an ice cream producer in Ukraine, producing ice creams such as "Tycoon", "Zolota Troyanda", and "Golden Key". It was also one of the companies invested in by WNISEF, which provided $4 million to the company. In 2002, he also became Chairman of the Board of Directors of the company "Polyus", which is based in Makiivka and is also an ice cream company, after he acquired a controlling stake in it. The acquisition of Polyus in 2002 allowed him to double the production of ice cream for Troyanda. In 2003, he was also elected to the Board of Directors of another confectionery company, Volzhanka, although the company is based in Russia and is part of SladKo. Avramenko also owns a vineyard in Kharkiv Oblast.

== Political career ==
In April 2002, Avramenko ran in the 2002 Ukrainian parliamentary elections in constituency no. 54 (Donetsk Oblast) for the electoral bloc For United Ukraine!. Avramenko later said he was invited to join the bloc by Leonid Kuchma. He was elected against 13 opponents with 67.22% of the vote. Once he joined the Verkhovna Rada as a deputy, he was initially part of the For United Ukraine! faction until June 2002, when he joined the Party of Regions. He was a member of the Committee on Fuel and Energy Complex, the temporary commission on monitoring electoral legislation, and the groups for relations with the United States, Russia, South Africa, and the United Kingdom. He opted not to run again in the 2006 Ukrainian parliamentary election, and left politics entirely. In later interview, he said the parliament "was not for him", and said he was not a politician.

== Personal life ==
He is married and has two sons, Oleksii and Anton, who own LLC "FK Kontraktovyi Dim", which is behind EasyPay.

As of 2017, he is the 77th richest person in Ukraine. He is considered a Ukrainian oligarch due to the scale of his business holdings and wealth. Avramenko occasionally gives to charity, giving 1 million hryvnias for medical equipment to the National Cancer Institute of Ukraine in 2019. He also financed Ruslan Ponomariov early in his career in chess after Ponomariov nearly switched national teams due to not being able to compete due to money.

== Honours and awards ==
Avramenko has been awarded the following honours:

- Honoured Worker of the Industry of Ukraine (2009)
