= Astarta Holding =

Agro-industrial holding

ASTARTA-KYIV
- Trade name: ASTARTA HOLDING PLC
- Native name: АСТАРТА-КИЇВ (ASTARTA-KYIV)
- Company type: Limited liability company
- Industry: Agriculture
- Founded: 1993
- Founder: Viktor Ivanchyk
- Headquarters: Kyiv, Ukraine
- Revenue: ▲€612 million (2024)
- Net income: ▲€83.0 million (2024)
- Total assets: ▲€748 million (2024)
- Total equity: ▲€549 million (2024)
- Website: https://astartaholding.com/

ASTARTA Holding (ASTARTA-KYIV, ASTARTA HOLDING PLC) is a vertically integrated agro-industrial holding company in Ukraine, a public European company. It produces food products with a focus on global markets.

The company was founded in March 1993 by Viktor Ivanchyk, who has been CEO since then.

The company's main activities are crop production, sugar production, dairy and meat farming, soybean processing, grain logistics, and bioenergy.

Since 2006, the company's shares have been listed on the Warsaw Stock Exchange (ticker: AST).

Astarta's majority shareholders are Viktor Ivanchyk and Fairfax Financial Holdings LTD. Other shareholders include institutional European and American investors.

In 2008, the company was one of the first in Ukraine to join the UN Global Compact network.

== Activities ==
Main activities:

Crop production. The company manages about 213 thousand hectares of agricultural land in seven regions. Key crops: sugar beet, soybeans, rapeseed, wheat, corn, sunflower. Annual production volumes: up to two million tonnes of sugar beet and one million tonnes of grains and oilseeds. The company processes part of its oilseeds at its processing plant in Ukraine and sells the rest.

Sugar production. The company's sugar refineries are located in the Poltava, Vinnytsia and Khmelnytsky regions. The company's annual sugar production in recent years has been 250-500 thousand tonnes. The company's plants can also produce sugar from raw cane sugar. The products are sold in the domestic and global markets.

Soybean processing. Soybeans are processed at the company's Globinsky processing plant, with an annual production capacity of 230 thousand tonnes. The company produces high-protein granulated meal, unrefined hydrated oil, and granulated shell. The products are sold domestically and exported to the EU, the Middle East and the Far East.

Livestock farming. Astarta is Ukraine's largest industrial milk producer. Its annual production is 119,000 tons of milk. The total cattle population exceeds 30,000 head.

Bioenergy. The holding company owns a bioenergy complex with a capacity of over 50 million m3 of biogas per year. Biogas is an alternative substitute for natural gas for the agro-industrial holding's processing enterprises.

Astarta actively cooperates with the world's leading financial institutions: the European Bank for Reconstruction and Development, the International Finance Corporation (IFC), the European Investment Bank, the Dutch Development Bank FMO, and the German Development Bank DEG.

== Timeline ==
1993 - Astarta-Kyiv was founded on March 2, Kyiv, Ukraine.

1994 - April, the company signed a landmark first contract for supplying energy to Ukrainian sugar factories in exchange for sugar.

1997 - The first agricultural subsidiary was established in the Poltava region, Ukraine, and the company started to engage in agricultural production.

1999 - Astarta became a shareholder in the first sugar plant in Ukraine and started producing sugar.

2003-2005 - the company acquired four more sugar plants in Ukraine.

2006 - on May 24, the holding company Astarta Holding N.V. was established under the laws of the Kingdom of the Netherlands.

On 17 August, Astarta Holding N.V. made its initial public offering on the Warsaw Stock Exchange. The funds raised through the IPO were invested in developing sugar production, improving agricultural technologies and modernising livestock farming.

2008 - Astarta started operations in the Khmelnytskyi region, Ukraine, by acquiring one more sugar plant.

2010 - the company launches a large-scale investment programme to build grain silo infrastructure, a new business. The first two grain silos were constructed and put into operation.

2011-2012 - the company built a new dairy complex for 1300 head of cattle and opened a newly constructed heifer complex for 5000 head of young stock in the Poltava region, Ukraine.

2014 - A processing plant was put into operation in the Poltava region, Ukraine (soybean processing into high-protein meal and soybean oil).

2017 - Astarta established an in-house IT company AgriChain, which started developing a unified digital agribusiness management system in 2018.

2018 - 2019 - the company continues its large-scale investment programme to create silo infrastructure, building and commissioning four more grain silos in the Poltava region, Ukraine. The company also purchased 200 new grain hoppers.

2020 - the company received a certificate of organic production.

2021 - Astarta paid its first dividend of EUR 0.5 per share.

2022 - In March, Astarta and the charity foundation "Believe in Yourself" created the Common Help Ukraine humanitarian platform to help the Ukrainian military and civilians affected by Russian aggression in Ukraine.

In October, the company's corporate headquarters were moved from Amsterdam (Netherlands) to Nicosia (Cyprus), and the company continued to list on the Warsaw Stock Exchange as Astarta Holding PLC.

2023 - Astarta marks its 30th anniversary on March 2.

2024 - Astarta became the first company in Ukraine to sign a special investment agreement with the Cabinet of Ministers of Ukraine, providing for state support of significant investments aimed at building a plant for the production of soy protein concentrate — a new product for the Ukrainian market. The total investment exceeds USD 80 million.

2025 - Astarta’s Board of Directors approved a new investment project to construct an oilseed processing plant (for soybeans and rapeseed) in Khmelnytskyi region, with a planned capacity of 400,000 tons per year and a total investment of USD 76 million.

2025 - Astarta and the International Finance Corporation (IFC) signed an investment agreement in Kyiv worth USD 40 million to support the construction of Ukraine’s first soy protein concentrate plant.

== Digital innovations ==
In 2017, Astarta set up an in-house IT company, AgriChain, which started developing a unified digital agribusiness management system in 2018. The AgriChain operating system automates various business processes of the company and allows online management of the land bank, agricultural production, crop monitoring, inventory and product logistics, warehousing and other business units. Since 2020, the product has been available to other agricultural companies.

In 2022, AgriChain started a partnership with Planet Labs, which integrated the AgriChainScout app and Planet Labs' platform for receiving satellite images of fields (Planet Visual, Planet NDVI). AgriChain also cooperates with the world's leading companies One Soil and Sentinel Hub.

The company was nominated for the global award, The 2nd Planet Purpose Awards 2023, in the Dream Big category.

In 2024, based on a joint study by Forbes Ukraine and KPMG in Ukraine, Astarta was included in the ranking of the Top 30 Digitalization Champions, taking 17th place among 203 Ukrainian companies across 11 economic sectors.

== Sustainable development ==
Astarta is actively working to implement sustainable development programmes in energy efficiency, environmental protection, social issues and corporate governance.

To accelerate the implementation of these programmes, the company has established a corporate governance system for sustainable development: an ESG Committee at the operational level and a Sustainability and CSR Committee at the Board of Directors level.

After joining the UN Global Compact network in 2008, Astarta started publishing non-financial reports, which have been prepared per GRI standards since 2017.

In 2008, Astarta was the first Ukrainian company to agree to sell carbon credits with the Multilateral Carbon Credit Fund established by the European Bank for Reconstruction and Development and the European Investment Bank under the Kyoto Protocol.

Since 2018, a comprehensive analysis of Astarta's progress in sustainable development based on ESG criteria has been carried out by the international rating agency EcoVadis. Astarta has been awarded the EcoVadis silver medal for three consecutive years.

Since 2020, the independent rating agency Sustainalytics has assessed the company's ESG risks. As of September 2021, Astarta was ranked second among 89 agricultural companies in the world evaluated by the agency and 93rd among 561 food companies.

Since 2021, Astarta has been reporting climate change issues on the Carbon Disclosure Project platform.

In June 2022, during the UN Global Compact Leaders Summit in New York, Astarta's CEO Viktor Ivanchyk was announced the winner of the 2022 SDG Pioneer for Sustainable Business Strategy nomination for his achievements in promoting the Sustainable Development Goals. Ukraine was represented at this competition for the first time.

To achieve its sustainability goals, Astarta actively cooperates with leading international institutions. In June 2023, the company received a USD 30 million financing from the EBRD. The package also included a USD 9 million sustainability-related loan from the Clean Technology Fund. It is the first transaction in Ukraine to be supported by the EBRD's High Climate Impact Corporate Sector Programme, financed by the Clean Technology Fund. The loan has an innovative blended finance structure whereby pricing is linked to achieving climate targets.

At the end of 2023, Astarta, together with the EBRD and EY, developed a climate corporate governance system and decarbonization strategy, which was approved by the Board of Directors on November 7; The document covers improvements in greenhouse gas emissions accounting (Scope 1–3), climate risk assessment, and the implementation of regenerative agriculture practices, energy efficiency, and the use of renewable energy sources.

In May 2024, Astarta received a “gold” rating from the European Bank for Reconstruction and Development in the “Climate Change Resilience” category for its activities related to achieving climate goals.

== Humanitarian and social initiatives ==
Astarta’s social initiatives are aimed at improving the well-being and sustainable development of the communities in which it operates. The company’s projects support local economic growth ("SMART Impulse for the Community"), foster youth leadership ("Pidiom"), and promote education through a combination of theory and practice ("Dual Education", "My Future in Agro", and "IT Education" in rural areas).

After the start of Russia’s full-scale invasion of Ukraine, the company focused on food and humanitarian security, launching the humanitarian project Common Help Ukraine together with the Believe in Yourself Charitable Foundation. Over nearly four years, the initiative has united more than 50 partners from 12 countries, providing assistance to over 831,000 Ukrainians.

The platform focuses on four key areas: providing humanitarian assistance to those affected by the war, supporting the military, and promoting the economic and psychosocial resilience of local communities.

Several large-scale entrepreneurial programs have been implemented — “Brave”, “Course for Independence”, and “Wings” — aimed at supporting small and medium-sized businesses, developing women’s entrepreneurship, and facilitating the social integration of veterans. These initiatives combine financial, educational, and mentoring support to create sustainable conditions for socially responsible entrepreneurship, economic resilience, and community self-sufficiency during and after the war.

Within these programs, 570 business initiatives have been financed, 1,110 jobs created, and 1,304 participants have completed training — both specialized (including the NUBiP “Crop Production and Processing” program) and business-oriented (from the “Light of Hope” Charitable Foundation and MIM Business School). According to an evaluation based on the SROI methodology, the social return on investment of the “Course for Independence” program amounts to €6.34 for every €1 invested.

A separate focus of the company’s activity is the reintegration and psychosocial support of veterans, families of servicemen, internally displaced persons, people with disabilities, low-income families, and the elderly. For this purpose, Astarta and the Ministry of Social Policy of Ukraine initiated and implemented the nationwide project “Resilience Centers.” Currently, more than 200 such centers operate across Ukraine.

== Astarta's contribution to the Ukrainian Economy ==
In August 2021, E&Y presented the results of its research on a comprehensive assessment of Astarta's total contribution to the Ukrainian economy.

In August 2025, Astarta reported that its contribution to the country’s economy over nineteen years of public operations had exceeded USD 3.12 billion.
