= Yuriy Zdebskyi =

Ukrainian former soldier and politician

- Юрій Здебський
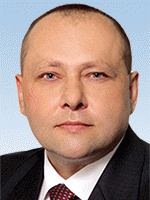
- Official portrait, 2019

People's Deputy of Ukraine
- Incumbent
- Assumed office 29 August 2019
- Preceded by: Volodymyr Mysyk
- Constituency: Kharkiv Oblast, No. 172

Personal details
- Born: 24 December 1972 (age 53) Liubar, Ukrainian SSR, Soviet Union (now Ukraine)
- Party: Servant of the People
- Other political affiliations: Independent
- Education: Kharkiv Military University; National Academy of the State Border Guard Service of Ukraine

Military service
- Allegiance: Ukraine
- Branch/service: State Border Guard Service of Ukraine
- Years of service: 1990–2018
- Rank: Colonel
- Battles/wars: Russo-Ukrainian War; War in Donbas

Yuriy Viktorovych Zdebskyi (Ukrainian: Юрій Вікторович Здебський; born 24 December 1972) is a Ukrainian former soldier and politician currently serving as a People's Deputy of Ukraine from Ukraine's 172nd electoral district since 29 August 2019. He is a member of Servant of the People.

== Early life and career ==
Yuriy Viktorovych Zdebskyi was born on 24 December 1972 in the settlement of Liubar, in Ukraine's Zhytomyr Oblast. He is a graduate of the Kharkiv Military University with a specialisation in mathematical support for automated control systems. He also graduated from the National Academy of the State Border Guard Service of Ukraine, and served as an officer in Ukraine's military for 28 years, retiring in 2018 with the rank of colonel in the State Border Guard Service of Ukraine. Prior to his combat service, he was actively involved in border issues, and he participated in a 2008 meeting with the Government of Ukraine regarding agreements on Ukraine's borders.

When the war in Donbas began in 2014, Zdebskyi was serving as deputy head for personnel work of the Security Service of Ukraine's eastern department. He went to the front as a member of the State Border Guard Service, and participated in combat until 2016. Following his retirement, Zdebskyi worked at the Central Clinical Hospital of the State Border Guard Service of Ukraine, where he served as the hospital's deputy head in 2018.

== Political career ==
During the 2019 Ukrainian presidential election, Zdebskyi was involved in the campaign of Volodymyr Zelenskyy, working in Ukraine's 170th electoral district (located in Kharkiv).

Zdebskyi ran in the 2019 Ukrainian parliamentary election as the candidate of Servant of the People (Zelenskyy's party) for People's Deputy of Ukraine in Ukraine's 172nd electoral district. He was successfully elected, defeating incumbent People's Deputy Volodymyr Mysyk with 43.61% to Mysyk's 43.17% - a difference of 0.44%, or 308 votes. An independent at the time of his election, Zdebskyi joined the Servant of the People parliamentary faction, as well as the Verkhovna Rada Committee on National Security, Defence, and Intelligence. He is also a member of the Slobozhanshchyna and "For Accelerated European Integration of Ukrainian Business" inter-factional associations.
