= Oleksandr Hereha =

Ukrainian politician

- Олександр Герега
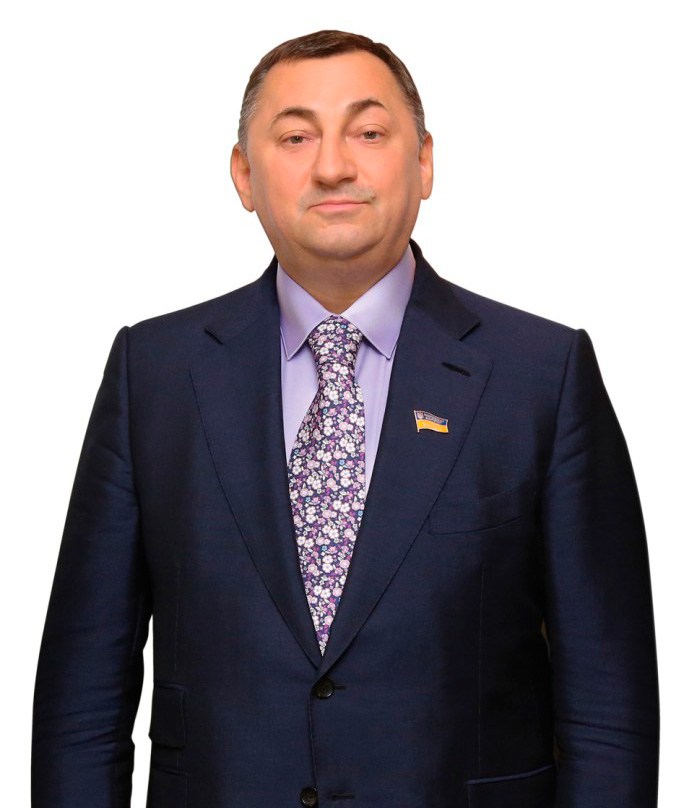
- Hereha in 2017

People's Deputy of Ukraine
- Incumbent
- Assumed office 12 December 2012
- Preceded by: Constituency established
- Constituency: Khmelnytskyi Oblast, No. 192

Personal details
- Born: 27 June 1967 (age 59) Horodok, Ukrainian SSR, Soviet Union (now Ukraine)
- Party: For the Future (since 2019)
- Other political affiliations: Party of Regions (2012–2014); For Tangible Solutions (since 2015); Independent
- Spouse: Halyna

Military service
- Allegiance: Soviet Union
- Branch/service: Soviet Army
- Years of service: 1984–1985

Oleksandr Volodymyrovych Hereha (Ukrainian: Олекса́ндр Володи́мирович Гере́га; born 27 June 1967) is a Ukrainian billionaire, businessman, philanthropist and politician currently serving as a People's Deputy of Ukraine from Ukraine's 192nd electoral district since 12 December 2012. One of the richest men in Ukraine, Hereha and his wife Halyna founded the group of companies Epicentr K construction hypermarkets and the Nova Liniya construction hypermarket chain. He is one of the richest men in Ukraine, with a net worth of $1.7 billion in 2021.

== Early life and career ==
Oleksandr Volodymyrovych Hereha was born on 27 June 1967 in Horodok, Khmelnytskyi Oblast, in what was then the Ukrainian Soviet Socialist Republic. His parents were factory workers. From 1984 to 1985, he served in the Soviet Army, and he subsequently studied at the Khmelnytskyi Cooperative Technical School from 1987 to 1990 before graduating from the Lviv University of Trade and Economics with a specialisation in organisational and administrative management.

== Business career ==
Hereha began working as a schoolboy, working at the local bread factory and sovkhoz on school holidays. In 1991, he founded a ceramic tiling and plumbing fixture service, before opening a retail store in 1996.

In 2003, Hereha and his wife Halyna founded Epicentr K LLC, which later became Ukraine's largest chain of construction and household hypermarkets, Epicenter. The first store of the chain was opened in 2005 on Bratislavska Street in Kyiv. From 2003 to October 2012, he headed the Epicenter K Limited Liability Company.

In 2013, Epicenter K LLC acquired a controlling stake in Nova Liniya construction supermarkets. In the same year, the Kalynivka logistics complex was acquired. In July 2015, the newly built Kalynivka customs terminal was opened on its basis.

As of 2021, 60 million people use Epicentr K's online services. Epicentr K has also forayed into agribusiness, owning its own production facilities and absorbing 19 production facilities in 2017.

In 2020, Epicenter began developing its marketplace. In the same year, it bought a controlling stake (80%) in the Vinnytsia Agro-Industrial Group holding. The Hereha family has invested over ₴6 billion into agribusiness, with plans to invest an additional ₴2.5 billion in 15 grain elevators with a total capacity of 1.5 million tons of grain storage.

The acquisition of the new assets brought the total area of land under cultivation of Epicenter Agro's agricultural enterprises to 160 thousand hectares in 5 regions (Vinnytsia, Khmelnytsky, Ternopil, Kyiv, Cherkasy, and Zhytomyr). The company grows grains and oilseeds: wheat, corn, sunflower, rapeseed, and soybeans. 20 livestock farms are owned by the Herehas. In 2019, they invested ₴3 billion into the development of a ceramic tile factory in Kalynivka, Fastiv Raion, Kyiv Oblast.

Hereha is one of the richest people in Ukraine, with a net worth of $1.7 billion according to Kyiv Post in 2021. According to the Pandora Papers, Hereha and his wife own five offshore companies in Cyprus.

In 2019, the Hereg couple invested UAH 3 billion in the construction of a plant for the production of ceramic tiles and porcelain stoneware by Epicentr Ceramic Corporation in Kalynivka, Kyiv region. The group's woodworking enterprise, the Osmoloda CSM, is also located in Kalush, Ivano-Frankivsk region.

In 2020, Epicenter K entered into an agreement with the Polish company OTCF to develop a mono-branded 4F store chain in Ukraine. In the same year, Epicenter began developing the country as a franchise of The Athlete's foot (TAF) sportswear and footwear chain. The brand is a subsidiary of Intersport International Corporation.

In March 2022, Multiservice dry cleaners were launched in the chain's stores, with the first outlets opening in a shopping center in Ivano-Frankivsk and on Polyarna Street in Kyiv. In 2023, it became known that the Hereg couple had purchased the Polish Intersport chain for €10 million.

=== Business activities in Russia and Russian-occupied Crimea ===
In 2018, it became known that the Hereha family had continued the operations of Epicentr K in Crimea following the peninsula's 2014 annexation by Russia. It was additionally discovered that they had been operating a company in Russia's Moscow Oblast. Hereha has claimed that he does not control Epicentr K in Crimea since the Russian annexation.

== Political career ==
Hereha was first elected as a People's Deputy of Ukraine in the 2012 Ukrainian parliamentary election as the candidate from Ukraine's 192nd electoral district. Elected as an independent, he joined the Party of Regions faction in the Verkhovna Rada (Ukraine's parliament). In 2014, he voted in favour of the anti-protest laws aimed at curbing the Euromaidan protests. He left the Party of Regions faction in February 2014.

In the 2014 Ukrainian parliamentary election, he won re-election with 73.86% of the vote, defeating the next-closest challenger, Myroslav Musiy, from the People's Front. He founded the party For Tangible Solutions in 2015. In the 2019 Ukrainian parliamentary election, he was again re-elected as a People's Deputy, winning 45.95% of the vote and defeating his closest competitor, Vasyl Humenyuk, from Servant of the People. Following his election, he became a member of For the Future. He is a member of the Verkhovna Rada Committee on tax, finance, and customs policy.

He is a member of the groups on inter-parliamentary relations with the Kingdom of Spain; the Italian Republic; the United States of America; the Swiss Confederation; the Republic of Poland; the Kingdom of the Netherlands; the Republic of Azerbaijan; the Ukrainian part of the Interparliamentary Assembly of the Verkhovna Rada of Ukraine, the Seimas of the Republic of Lithuania and the Seimas and Senate of the Republic of Poland.

== Public activities ==
In 2004, Hereha founded the Epicenter for Children Foundation, which develops social and sports schools.

In 2011, he founded the charitable foundation “Oleksandr and Halyna Hereh Foundation.”

In 2012, he founded the Khmelnytsky regional public organization “For Specific Causes”, which specializes mainly in helping veterans, repairing hospitals and schools, and equipping gyms.

In April 2013, he was elected president of the Ukrainian Weightlifting Federation."

On June 16, 2017, he was elected vice president of the Ukrainian Football Association (UAF), and in August 2020, he was elected first vice president of the Volleyball Federation of Ukraine.

In the first days after Russia's full-scale invasion of Ukraine, the co-owners of the Epicenter allocated more than 400 million UAH to help the Ukrainian military.

Together with the Kyiv City State Administration, in February 2022, the Humanitarian Headquarters was organized to provide the Armed Forces, the military and the population. Epicenter provided its own premises, vehicle fleet, labor force, and strategic stocks of goods.

The company ensured the reception and dispatch of humanitarian aid for Kyiv, Bucha, Irpin and Chernihiv.

In July 2022, Epicenter supported the initiative of the country's First Lady Olena Zelenska and the UNITED24 fundraising platform to raise funds for ambulances. The company donated 20 cars and announced a campaign to purchase 55 resuscitation vehicles and armored vehicles to evacuate the wounded from the war zone.
