= Hlynets =

Rural locality in Lviv Oblast, Ukraine

Hlynets Глинець
- Village
- Interactive map of Hlynets
- Location within Ukraine Location within Lviv Oblast
- Coordinates: 49°49′48″N 23°28′36″E
- Country: Ukraine
- Oblast: Lviv Oblast
- Raion: Yavoriv Raion
- Established: 1460
- Area: 4.47 km^{2} (1.73 sq mi)
- Population (2011): 211
  - Density: 47.2/km^{2} (122/sq mi)
- Post code: 81067
- Area code: +380 3259

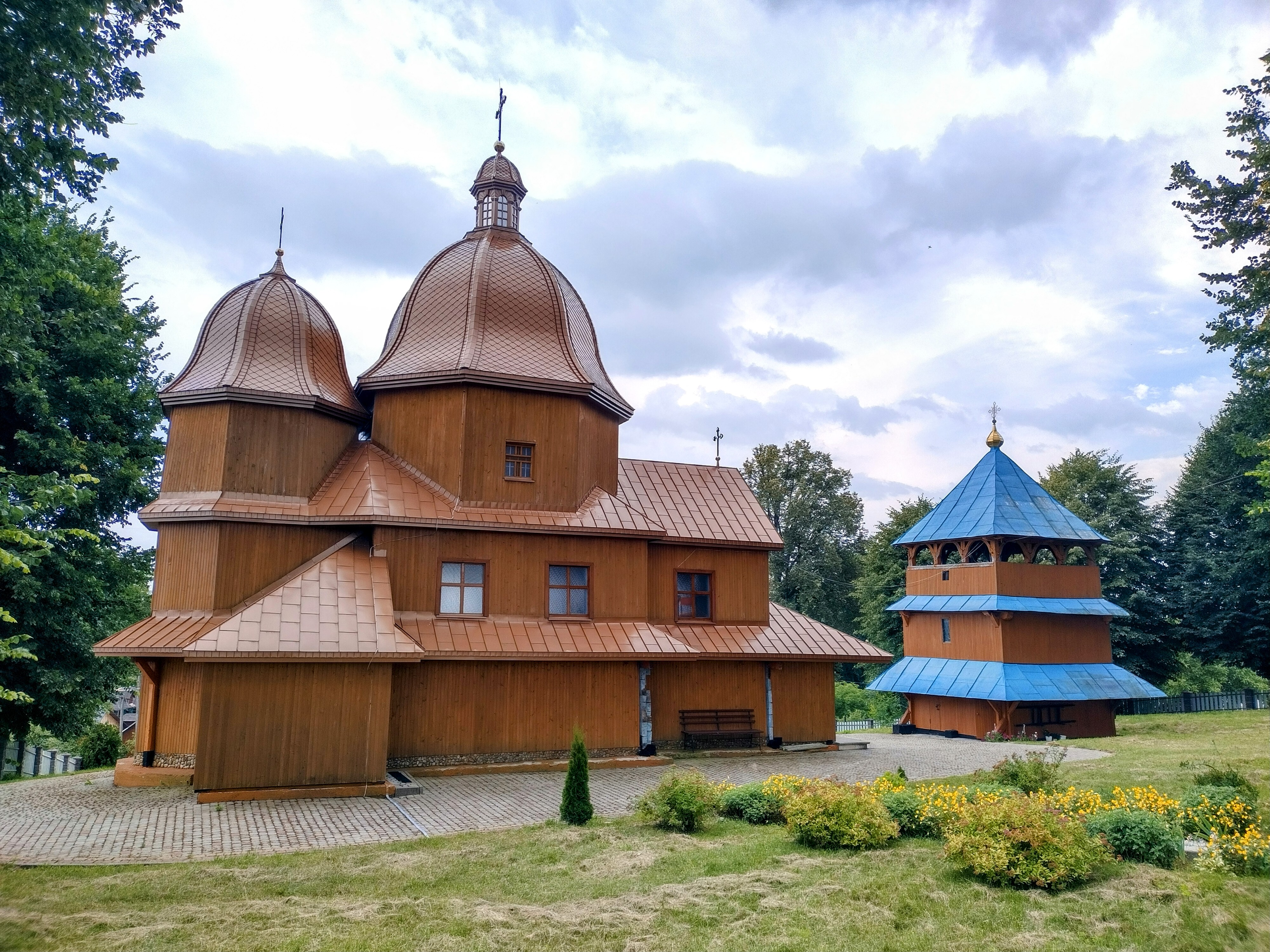
Panoramic view of the Church of the Nativity of the Blessed Virgin Mary (photographed 2023)

Hlynets (Ukrainian: Глинець) is a Ukrainian village in Yavoriv Raion (district) of Lviv Oblast (province). It belongs to Yavoriv urban hromada, one of the hromadas of Ukraine. Until 1949 it was known as Liashky (Polish: Laszki) when it was renamed after a local creek Hlynets (Polish: Gliniec).

== Notable people ==
- Halyna Hereha, businesswoman and politician
