= Viktor Ivanchyk =

Ukrainian entrepreneur

Viktor Petrovich Ivanchyk
- Віктор Петрович Іванчик
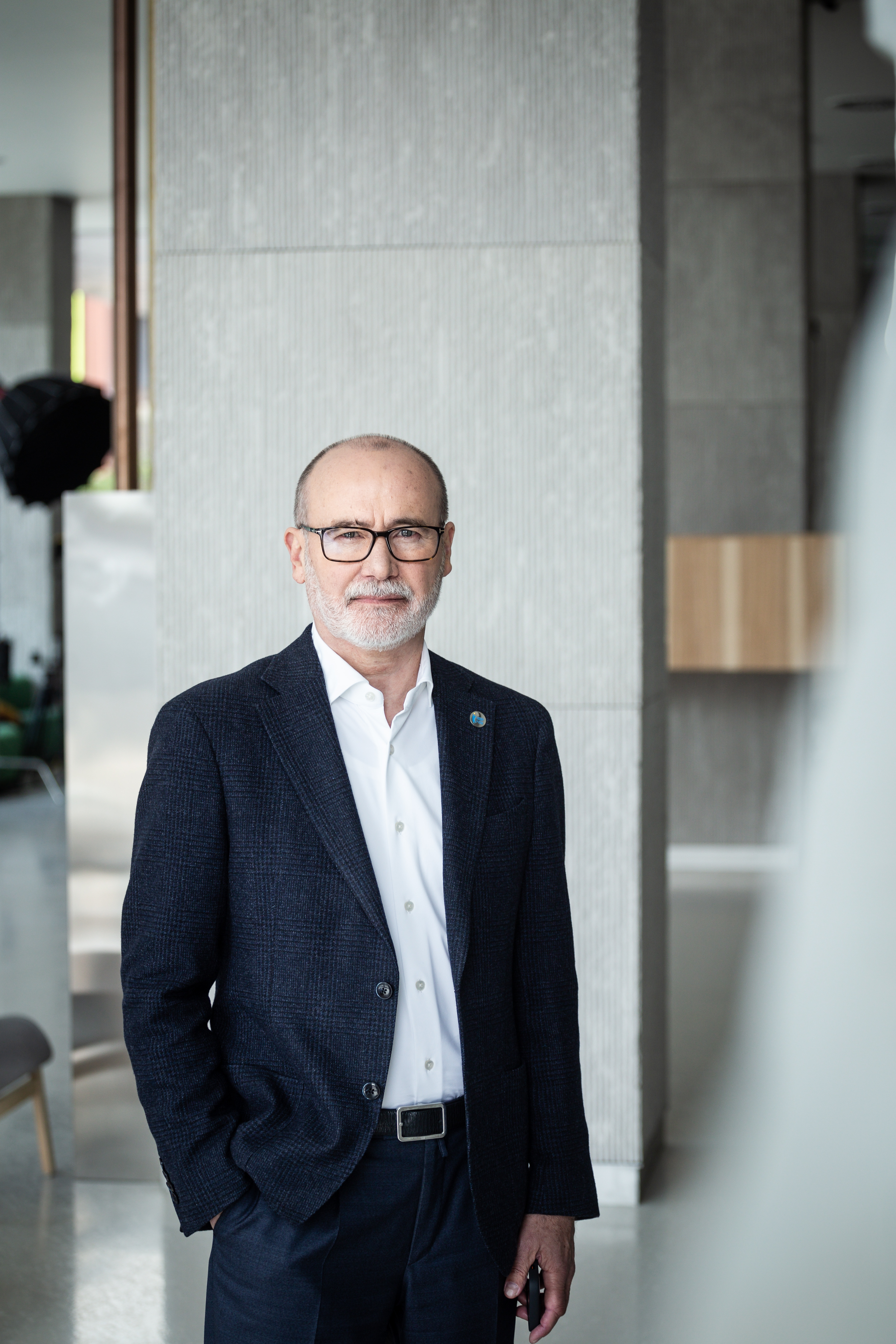
- Born: 2 April 1956 (age 70); Puzykove village, Globinsky district, Poltava Oblast, Ukrainian SSR, Soviet Union (now Ukraine)
- Citizenship: Ukrainian
- Education: National Aerospace University "Kharkiv Aviation Institute"
- Occupations: co-founder, majority shareholder and CEO of Astarta Holding
- Spouse: Married
- Children: 3

Viktor Ivanchyk (Ukrainian: Віктор Петрович Іванчик; born 2 April 1956, Puzykove village, Poltava Oblast, Ukraine) is a Ukrainian entrepreneur, co-founder, majority shareholder and CEO of Astarta Agricultural Holding. Honoured Worker of Agriculture of Ukraine.

As of 2021, Ivanchyk is among the top 100 wealthiest Ukrainians with $130 million.

== Biography ==
=== Early life and education ===
Viktor Ivanchyk was born in Puzykove village, Globinsky district, Poltava Oblast, Ukraine. As a teenager, he earned his first money on a farm and later worked as a tractor and combine operator's assistant. During his student years, he also worked in construction.

- 1973–1979 – MSc in mechanical engineering from the National Aerospace University "Kharkiv Aviation Institute".
- 1994 – an executive management course at the French Business School.
- 2006–2007 - Senior Executive MBA from the International Institute of Management (MIM-Kyiv).
- 2019 - School of Strategic Architect programme from the Kyiv-Mohyla Business School.

=== Career ===
- 1979–1983 - assistant master, process engineer at the Kyiv Aviation Production Association.
- 1983–1993 - civil service.
- In 1993, Mr. Viktor Ivanchyk became a co-founder and director of Astarta-Kyiv, a Ukrainian company with foreign investment.

In 2006, Astarta's team, led by Viktor Ivanchyk, successfully completed the company's initial public offering on the Warsaw Stock Exchange and became the first Ukrainian public agricultural company.

As of January 2024, Mr. Viktor Ivanchyk is the company's CEO and a majority shareholder of Astarta Holding, with a 40.3% stake.

=== Humanitarian and social activities ===
In 2009, Ivanchyk and his wife, Iryna Ivanchyk, founded the Charitable Foundation Believe in Yourself to promote education and science for a new generation of Ukrainians by supporting talented students and teachers

With the outbreak of the full-scale war in 2022, the foundation transformed its activities and, together with Astarta, created the Common Help Ukraine humanitarian platform, which brings together dozens of partners from twelve countries and over 1,000 volunteers. The platform's main activities include humanitarian aid to war-affected Ukrainians, support to the Armed Forces, regional entrepreneurship. There is also the "Resilience" programme targeted at military war veterans and their families, internally displaced persons, people with disabilities, those facing destitution and older people

Since 2018, Ivanchyk has acted as the chairman and a supervisory board member of the National University of Kyiv-Mohyla Academy. He is also a member of the Presidiums of the Federation of Employers of Ukraine, the Ukrainian Agrarian Confederation, and the Ukrainian Agribusiness Club.

== Family ==
Married, has three daughters and a stepson, Oleksandr Savilov, co-founder of Salateira restaurant chain. His wife, Iryna Ivanchyk, is a co-founder of the charity foundation "Believe in Yourself", and a senator of the Ukrainian Catholic University.

== Recognition ==
- "Entrepreneur of the Year 2023" in the nomination "Business Transparency and Business Reputation" and "Forbes’ Audience Choice" according to Forbes Ukraine.
- "CEO of the Most Effective Company 2023" in the agricultural sector of Ukraine, according to Forbes Ukraine.
- SDG Pioneer for Sustainable Business Strategy according to the UN Global Compact, New York, 2022.
- Honoured Worker of Agriculture of Ukraine (2007).
- In 2024, Viktor Ivanchyk was included in the Top 100 list of NV media as a person, who has played a key role in Ukraine for the last 10 years.

== Publications ==
- ""Astarta": How the Concept of Longevity Becomes Business Capital". Forbes.ua (in Ukrainian).
- "Hard and Soft Skills – A Vital Necessity for a Modern Leader: Leadership Rules of "Astarta" Founder and CEO Viktor Ivanchyk". Forbes.ua (in Ukrainian).
- "Leaders of "Astarta" and Bolt on Strategy, Leadership, and Effective Management". Forbes.ua (in Ukrainian).
