= Halyna Hereha =

Ukrainian businesswoman and politician

- Галина Герега
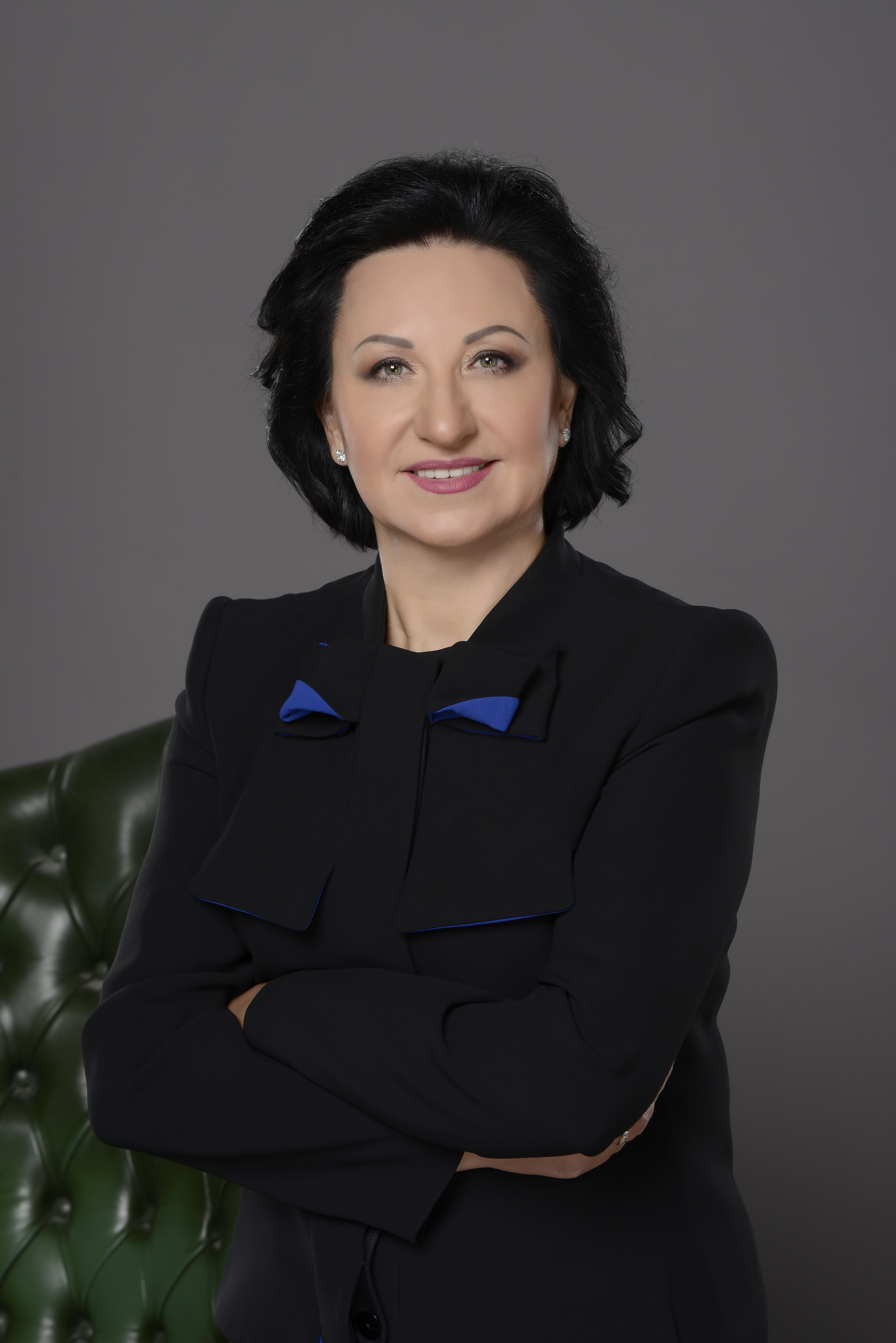

Acting Mayor of Kyiv
- In office 12 July 2012 – 5 June 2014
- Preceded by: Leonid Chernovetsky
- Succeeded by: Vitali Klitschko

Secretary of the Kyiv City Council
- In office 20 April 2011 – 5 June 2014

Personal details
- Born: 9 August 1959 (age 66) Hlynets, Ukrainian SSR, Soviet Union
- Party: Independent
- Spouse: Oleksandr Hereha
- Children: 1

Halyna Fedorivna Hereha (Ukrainian: Галина Федорівна Герега; born 9 August 1959) is a Ukrainian businesswoman and politician who served as acting mayor of Kyiv from 2012 to 2014. Hereha also was a Deputy Mayor and Secretary of the Kyiv City Council from 20 April 2011 to 5 June 2014. She is the co-owner of the store chain Epicentr K along with her husband, Oleksandr Hereha.

== Early life ==
She was born on 9 August 1959 in the village of Hlynets, Yavoriv Raion, Lviv Oblast, which was then part of the Ukrainian SSR. After completing secondary school, she entered the Lviv Cooperative Technical School, from which she graduated from in 1978. Hereha then attended the State University of Trade and Economics, from which she also graduated from in 1983 within the Faculty of Technology.

After graduating, she worked as a master in industrial training for vocational education at the Kyiv Culinary College. In 1988, she switched to being a technologist for Association 906, which was an internal technical association attached to the higher party school in Kyiv. From 1994 to 1998 she was then Deputy Director of Hlybochytsia, and then up until 2003 was then the financial director of Tsermet AGS LLC.

She defended her PhD thesis on "Economic efficiency of shopping malls" in 2015.

== Political career ==
During the 2006 Ukrainian local elections, she ran for a seat within the Kyiv City Council as a member of the Kyiv Public Asset party. During her time in the council, she was Secretary of the Standing Committee on Trade, Entrepreneurship, Public Catering and Services, and during an interview in 2007 she stated her main focus in the role would be on gambling. Later, on 20 April 2011, she was elected with 89 votes as the new secretary of the council after being nominated by then Mayor of Kyiv, Leonid Chernovetskyi. She was elected after the previous secretary, Oles Dovgiy, announced his voluntary resignation.

In 2012, she ran for the Verkhovna Rada in the G215 constituency (Kyiv, Troieshchyna), but was defeated by Andriy Ilyenko, a candidate from the All-Ukrainian Union of Freedom.

== Wealth ==
In 2011, Oleksandr and Halyna Hereha took 27th place in the ranking of the richest people in Ukraine according to FOCUS magazine with a fortune of $890.8 million. In a similar ranking for 2010, they held 26th place with a fortune of $395.4 million.

== See also ==
- List of mayors of Kyiv
