= Oleksandr Leshchynskyi (businessman) =

Ukrainian politician and businessman (born 1964)

- Олександр Лещинський
- An official portrait of him from 2007.

People's Deputy of Ukraine
- In office 29 March 1998 – 12 December 2012

Personal details
- Born: Oleksandr Olegovich Leshchynskyi; 2 March 1964 (age 62) Dnipropetrovsk, Ukrainian SSR, Soviet Union (now Dnipro, Ukraine)
- Party: Labour Ukraine (2000-2001); Party of Regions (2001-2002} For United Ukraine! (2002); Party of Regions (2002-2012)
- Education: Donetsk National Technical University

Oleksandr Olegovich Leshchynskyi (Ukrainian: Олександр Лещинський; born 2 March 1964) is a Ukrainian politician and businessman who served as a People's Deputy of Ukraine in the Verkhovna Rada from 1998 to 2012 through the 3rd to 6th convocations, primarily as a member of the Party of Regions. He is also a businessman and is considered one of the Ukrainian oligarchs due to his ownership of the enterprise "Ukrinterproduct", which was later called the "Lauffer Group", a major food corporation in Ukraine that consolidated grain enterprises, food factories, and dairies.

== Early life ==
Leshchynskyi was born on 2 March 1964 in the city of Dnipropetrovsk, which was then part of the Ukrainian SSR in the Soviet Union. He is ethnically Jewish and is the son of Oleg Hryhorovych and Vera Davydovna. After graduating from secondary school, he decided to pursue higher education, attending the Donetsk National Technical University (then the Donetsk Polytechnic Institute starting in 1981. While obtaining his degree, he simultaneously worked multiple jobs, becoming a concrete worker at the Research and Experimental Base of the Donetsk Design and Research Institute in 1982 and doing his mandatory military service in the Soviet Army until 1984. Upon completing his service, he worked as an underground electrician at the Fourth Mine Tunneling Construction Administration of "Donetsk Mine Tunneling". He finally graduated in 1989 with a specialisation as a mining engineer. After graduation, he briefly worked as Head of the Sales Department of "Illusion", until he left to work as an engineer at "Elkos" and later as a consultant at "Favorit" after the collapse of the Soviet Union. He also worked as a consultant at the small enterprise "Forward" until 1993.

In 1996, he went back to pursue a higher degree at the Donetsk National Technical University, graduating in 2002 from the Faculty of Economics and Law with a specialisation as a lawyer.

== Business career and Ukrinterproduct/Lauffer ==
=== As Ukrinterproduct ===
Sometime in the 1990s, he founded Ukrinterproduct, with his senior partner in the firm being Yevhen Shcherban. At the time of its start, it ran some vodka and bread factories, including one in Mariupol. A few years after it was founded, it controlled about 30 grain-processing enterprises, 20 canning firms, and meat plants in Makiivka and Krasnoarmiisk. He also gradually bought out sugar plants in the west, such as in Khmelnytskyi and Vinnytsia, alongside grain plants in Kyiv and Kirovohrad Oblast. However, by the end of the 1990s, Leshchynskyi switched to buying more factories specialising in oils and fats. After Shcherban died in 1996, Leshchynskyi split his assets in Ukrinterproduct with Rinat Akhmetov, with Akhmetov taking the fuel and industry side and Leshchynskyi the food side. Two years later, in 1998, Ukrinterproduct purchased a controlling stake in a fish cannery in Mariupol, although it did not fare well and went through bankruptcy proceedings, and attempts to sell it went in vain due to courts and Volodymyr Boyko backing out. Four years later, in 2002, he bought parts of Svytaoshyno in Kyiv through both Ukrinterproduct and the Azov Food company, which he had ties to. By 2003, Ukrinterproduct was the largest operator in the food market of Ukraine with 18 bread plants, two sugar plants, confectionery factories, and meat plants. It was noted at the time that he intended to expand Ukrinterproduct to purchasing fishing sites and factories in Crimea after the failed venture in Mariupol.

=== As Lauffer, expansion into the bread industry ===
Examples of commonly produced breads in Ukraine. In the 2000s, Leshchynskyi consolidated the bread industry in Ukraine under Lauffer.

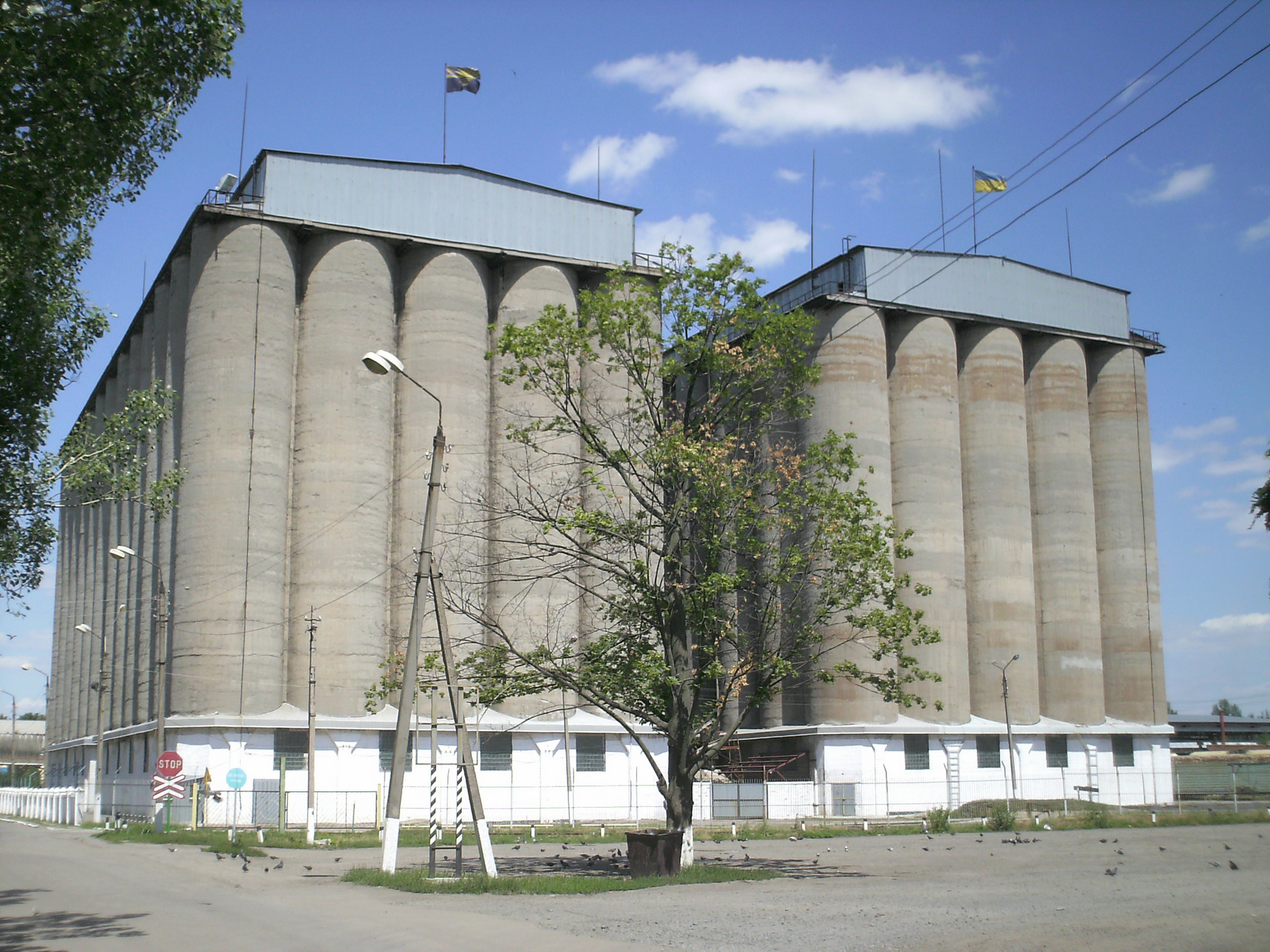
Slavoliya, an oil and fat combine factory in Sloviansk, which he acquired in 2005.

By 2003, Leshchynskyi also acquired Marg-West, the largest mayonnaise producer in Ukraine, which had 517 staff. Two years later, he was also allowed by the Antimonopoly Committee of Ukraine to take over a 50% stake in Slavoliya, which was based in Sloviansk and was an enterprise specialising in an oil and fat combine factory and a margarine plant in Donetsk. During this time in the mid-2000s, he also consolidated his bread enterprises more after multiple oligarchs left the field, such as Akhmetov and Danko, with Leshchynskyi buying out a bread combine in Donetsk from Akhmetov's System Capital Management. The consolidated enterprises for bread were known as "Donbasskhlib", with over 90% of the Donbas's bread coming from it. It also controlled most of the big flour mills in the Donbas, which allowed lower pricing. Around this time, Ukrinterproduct was also renamed to the Lauffer Group in 2002. In 2011, Leshchynskyi decided to invest nearly 100 million hryvnias in a credit line to the bread-products combine in Donetsk. He also began expanding under Lauffer that year, buying out Khlib (Dnipropretrovsk), Karavai (Luhansk, which held 20% of the bread market in Luhansk), Saltivskyi bread combine (Kharkiv, owned by Arsen Avakov), and TiS (owned by Volodymyr Slabovskyi and Mykhailo Tabachnyk). He was also allowed by the Antimonopoly Committee in 2012 to buy out Odeskyi Karavai and a bread-products company in Simferopol, Crimea (the latter was through Sberbank with a loan). By that point, Lauffer held around 100 enterprises, of which 39 were bread-related.

=== War in the Donbas and debts ===
Lauffer was heavily affected by the ensuing War in the Donbas and the 2014 Russian annexation of Crimea. The latter event led to nine of his enterprises based in Crimea (8 bread plants and a mill) being nationalised by the new authorities there in late 2014, which led Sberbank, in turn, to stop servicing the loan. He attempted to remedy this through the courts in Crimea and Moscow, but lost the cases. Meanwhile, in the Donbas, initially his plants ran at around 50-60% of their full capacity, with the plants in Donetsk falling sharply in production. Leshchynskyi claimed his factories in Horlivka and Yenakiieve were then seized by the pro-Russian, separatist Donetsk People's Republic, although he said he attempted to negotiate with them. In December 2015, the Russian-based Atlant bought a few of his assets in the Donbas including bread plants in Horlivka, Yenakiieve, Makiivka, Khartsyzk, Snizhne, Shakhtarsk, two bread plants in Donetsk, the mayonnaise plant in Donetsk, a pasta factory in Urozhai, and a bread-products combine. Leshchynskyi also responded by saying he would consolidate his businesses in Kharkiv and Odesa following the loss of control in the Donbas. However, in 2016, in statements through Lauffer, he confirmed that Lauffer was still selling its products in DPR-controlled areas, but justified this by saying he had lost 2.5 billion hryvnias during the annexation and war. In 2016, he also said that armed men had tried to seize one of his plants in Sloviansk (which was out of the ATO zone at the time), but by 2017 most of Lauffer's assets were frozen over loans with Oschadbank that were allegedly not paid, leading to wage protests across his enterprises. His flour mill in Mariupol was seized by Sberbank in response to the debts that year, with the reported debt being over 3 billion hryvnias.

== Political career ==
Leshchynskyi first entered politics in 1998, when he ran in the 1998 Ukrainian parliamentary elections for the 3rd convocation of the Verkhovna Rada in constituency No. 58 (Donetsk Oblast). After being elected, he was initially unaffiliated as an independent until he joined Labour Ukraine in 2000 and later the Party of Regions upon its formation in 2001. He was re-elected again in the 2002 Ukrainian parliamentary elections for the 58th constituency, this time representing the electoral bloc For United Ukraine!. He won with 42.91% of the vote against 15 other opponents. His election in 2002 was briefly declared invalid by the CEC shortly thereafter, which said that during a recount, it found there were more votes cast for Anatoliy Khmelyovy, a member of the Communist Party of Ukraine. Upon joining the Rada again for its 4th convocation, he stayed as a member of United Ukraine for two months in 2002 before returning to the Party of Regions for the rest of his mandate. He was also briefly, from 2004 to 2005, a trustee of Viktor Yanukovych for the 2004 Ukrainian presidential election in constituency No. 58. Leshchynskyi then ran for a 3rd time in the 2006 Ukrainian parliamentary elections, although this time he opted to run with the party list of the Party of Regions, and was no. 53 on the list. He was thus re-elected, but his mandate did not last long due to the early dissolution of the parliament and the start of the snap 2007 Ukrainian parliamentary elections just a year later. 2007 would be the last time he was re-elected to the Rada, which he entered through the party list again, but as No. 54 on the list. He did not run again in the following convocation and left parliament afterwards after 14 years.

Leshchynskyi was most notable for his truancy in the Rada, and was only behind Rinat Akhmetov in this for multiple years. In 2005, he did not speak to a session of the Rada once, and was one of two alongside Volodymyr Avramenko that year. In 2009, he was one of the 9 parliamentarians to not take part in more than 60 name registrations. In 2010, he was not present at 74 out of the 75 plenary meetings held in the Rada, and was one of seven to do so. In 2011, he was not present at any of the 60 plenary meetings of the Rada, and was one of 13 that year. In 2012, he attended only 1 of the 553 regular sessions of the Verkhovna Rada and was thus the 2nd-lowest attending parliamentarian.

== Personal life ==
He is married to Viktoria Leonidovna, who is the Head of the Market Analysis Department at Inter-Inves LLC. Together, they have a son, Leonid, who was born in 1985.

Leshchynskyi, due to the scale of his holdings and wealth, is often identified as a Ukrainian oligarch and was included as part of the group in an economic study by Demid Chernenko in 2018.
