= Kulynychi =

Rural locality in Kharkiv Oblast, Ukraine

Kulynychi Кулиничі
- Rural settlement
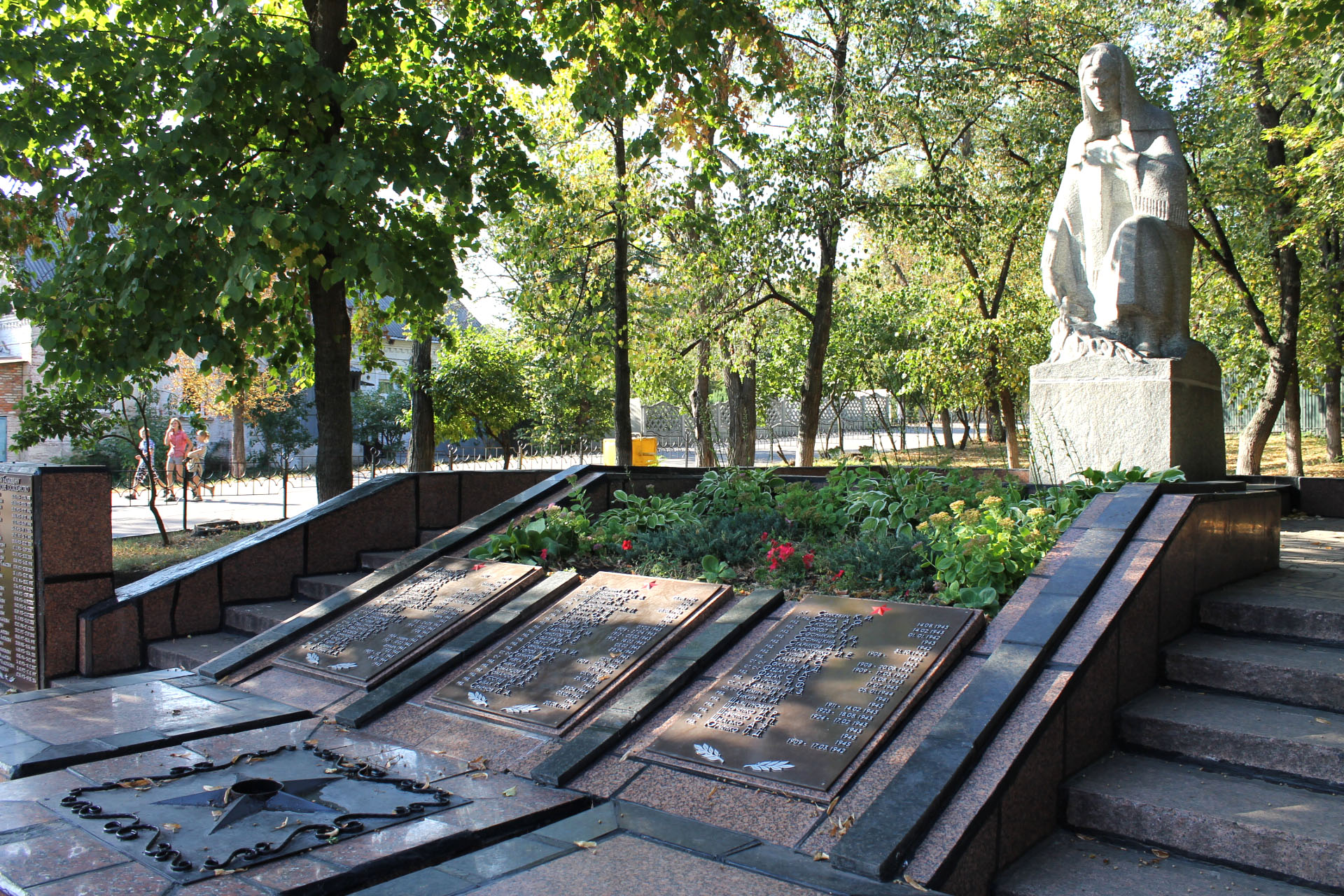
- 1941-1945, Kharkiv, former village of Kulynichi, Seventh Guards Army Street
- Interactive map of Kulynychi
- Location in Kharkiv Oblast Location in Ukraine
- Coordinates: 49°58′55″N 36°23′10″E
- Country: Ukraine
- Oblast: Kharkiv Oblast
- Raion: Kharkiv Raion

Population (2022)
  - Total: 2,972
- Time zone: UTC+2 (EET)
  - Summer (DST): UTC+3 (EEST)

Kulynychi (Ukrainian: Кулиничі, Russian: Кулиничи) is a rural settlement in Kharkiv Raion of Kharkiv Oblast in Ukraine. It is an eastern suburb of the city of Kharkiv. Since 2013, Kulynychi has belonged to the Kharkiv urban hromada, one of the hromadas of Ukraine. Population: 2,972 (2022 estimate).

== History ==
In 2013, Kharkiv Oblast Rada voted to merge the settlement with the city of Kharkiv. However, as of 2022, the population statistics estimate published by the State Statistics Service of Ukraine still listed Kulynychi as a separate urban-type settlement.

During the Russian invasion of Ukraine, Kulynychi was repeatedly shelled by the Russian army. Several houses, a clinic building and a kindergarten were seriously damaged.

Until 26 January 2024, Kulynychi was designated an urban-type settlement. On this day, a new law entered into force which abolished this status, and Kulynychi became a rural settlement.

== Economy ==
=== Transportation ===
The settlement is included in the road network of Kharkiv.

Industrialnaya railway station is located in Kulynychi but it does not have passenger traffic. It is a terminal station on a branch from Kharkiv. The closest station with passenger traffic is Traktornyi Zavod of Kharkiv Metro.
