= Creative Group =

Creative Group, OJSC
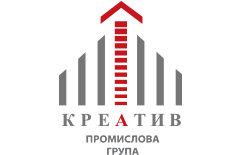
- Industry: producing sunflower oil and meal, fats and margarines, soybean meal and oil, biofuel pellets; agriculture
- Founded: 1991; 35 years ago
- Headquarters: Kropyvnytskyi, Ukraine
- Key people: Stanislav Berezkin, Maxym Berezkin, Yuri Davydov
- Number of employees: 3200
- Website: www.creativegroupua.com

Creative Group (full name: PJSC Creative Group Public Limited) is a Ukrainian integrated agro-industrial company specialized in the production of sunflower oil and meal, fats and margarines, soybean meal and oil, biofuel pellets and is also engaged in agriculture.

The Group has 9 plants and 8 elevator complexes, located in the Kropyvnytskyi, Mykolaiv, Kyiv, Dnipro and Sumy regions of Ukraine. The company has a land bank of around 30,000 hectares. In 2013, the company’s consolidated revenue amounted to $1.055 billion.

The company produces and sells both unbranded products to large industrial buyers and branded products for the retail segment (brands include Sonola, Delikon, Dyvne, Kum and Maslovyya). The company sells its products throughout Ukraine and exports to over 25 countries, including countries in Northern Africa, the CIS, India, and Asian region (Malaysia, Philippines and Indonesia). The group has representative offices in China and the UAE. Around 70% of the company's products are exported.

== Activities ==
The company ranks among the top 3 of Ukraine's biggest sunflower seed processors with a market share of more than 10% (measured during the period from September 2012 to February 2013) and is the country's second-largest sunflower oil exporter. The Group has a market share of about 30% in the production of fats and margarines and about 24% in soybean processing by the installed capacities. In 2013 the group processed 1.051 million tonnes of sunflower seeds.

The group’s plants produce unrefined and refined sunflower oil in bottles for retail sale and export to countries in the CIS region, Germany, the United Kingdom, the United Arab Emirates, Israel and Panama, and unrefined sunflower oil for sale in bulk and export for further processing. The main export markets for the group’s unrefined sunflower oil are countries in Northern Africa and EU, as well as India and China. The group also exports sunflower meal to countries in Western Europe and Scandinavia.

The main buyers of soybean oil are EU food industry companies, while most of the soybean meal is used as feed in poultry farming and livestock breeding. The group's facilities produce 75 types of fats, including confectionery and cooking fats and milk fat substitutes for the food industry, as well as 25 types of margarines for industrial production and retail sales. The company also produces special margarine. The group's fats segment products are sold in Ukraine and CIS countries. Products are mostly sold in bulk, partially destined for retail sales under the Sonola and Delikon brands.

The group uses processed agricultural products such as husk and waste for the production of biofuel pellets (around 40,000 tons per year), mainly for European Union-based green energy producers. The company is involved in many court cases due to non-payment for delivered equipment and goods.
