= Kernel Holding =

Ukrainian sunflower oil producer

Kernel Holding S.A.
- Native name: Кернел
- Type: Public
- Traded as: WSE: KER
- ISIN: LU0327357389
- Industry: Agriculture
- Founded: 1994
- Founder: Andriy Verevskyi
- Headquarters: Kyiv, Ukraine
- Website: kernel.ua

Kernel Holding S.A. (Ukrainian: Кернел) is the largest producer of sunflower oil in Ukraine. It operates under the brands Shchedry Dar, Stozhar and Chumak Zolota, exports oils and grain worldwide, and provides storage for grains and seeds. In 2019, it produced 8% of sunflower oil in the world and its products are supplied to over sixty countries, and operated 28 grain elevators in Ukraine with a total storage capacity of 2.34 million tons of grain, the highest among private-sector companies in the country.

== History ==
It was established in 1994 by Andriy Verevskyi.

Kernel launched an initial public offering on the Warsaw Stock Exchange in 2007, becoming the second Ukrainian company to hold an IPO in Warsaw. In 2020, Forbes Ukraine ranked Kernel as the third-largest private-sector company in Ukraine by revenue. Forbes Ukraine ranked Kernel the fourth-best employer in its 2021 list of the fifty best employers in the country.

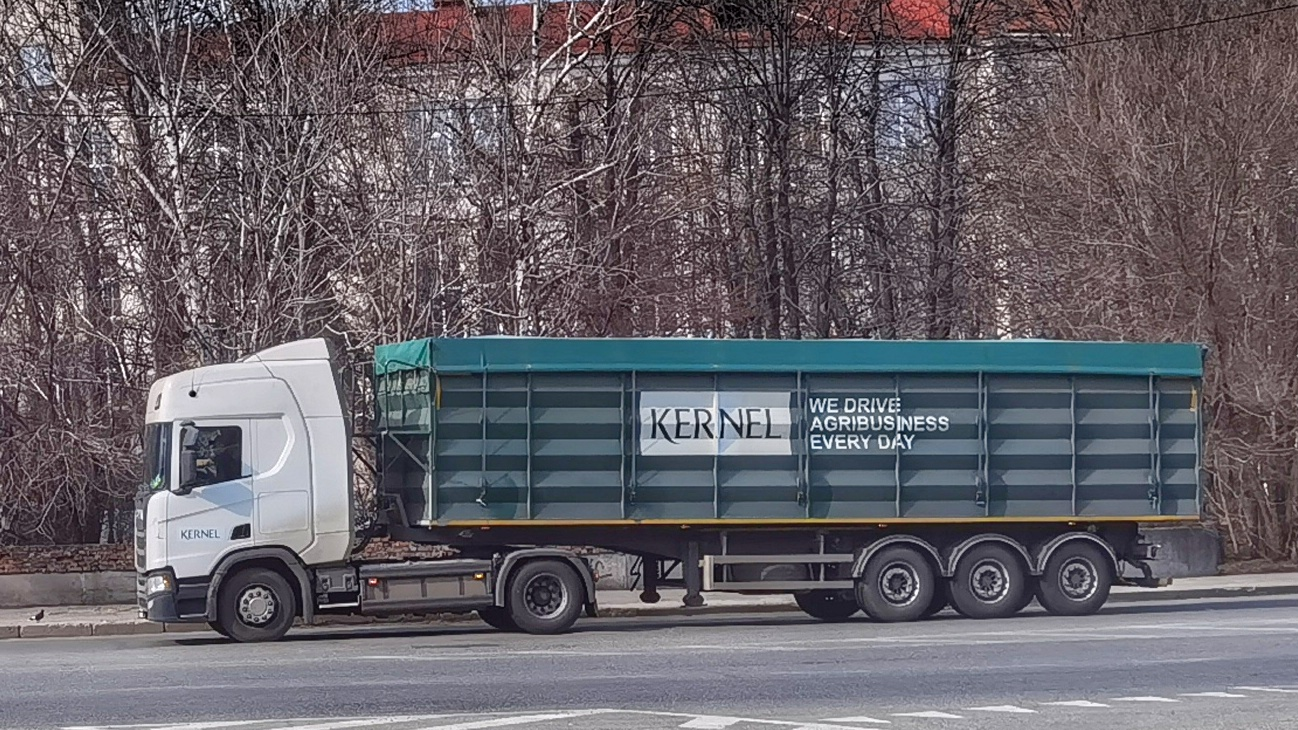
Kernel truck in Dnipro, Ukraine.

The company is actively investing in the development of small and medium agribusiness in Ukraine. Since 2019, the Open Agribusiness affiliate program has been operating. Kernel provides small and medium-sized partners with technology and agronomic support, access to credit, currency and forward programs. The company also helps partners protect their property from raiders and provides funding for the construction of elevators, granaries, land purchase. The project allows farmers to increase land productivity, boost yields and improve profits.

In 2023, Kernel Holding announced its intention to delist from Warsaw Stock Exchange. Andrii Verevskyi announced an offer to buy out all the shareholders in Kernel Holding at a share price approximately three times below their pre-war value, claiming the exit was due to Russia’s invasion of Ukraine.

The delisting was described as a controversial move to push out minority shareholders which could undermine foreign funding for the postwar reconstruction of Ukraine.

Verevskyi became entangled in a bitter courtroom fight with minority shareholders regarding the allocation to selected shareholders of newly issued shares, which Verevskyi ultimately won in March 2026 in the Luxembourg Court of Appeal.

In April 2026, Kernel signed an agreement to acquire agricultural company Enselco Holding for $348 million.

In August 2026, Verevskyi's Namsen Limited launched a process to buy out the minority shareholders, to prepare for delisting at the Warsaw Stock Exchange. The buyout price was set by the Luxembourg financial regulator, the Commission de Surveillance du Secteur Financier, following two independent valuations by accountants Grant Thornton and KPMG.

In November 2026, Kernel announced the shutdown of oil extraction at its plants nationwide (Poltava, Starokostiantyniv, Bandurka, Chornomorsk and Kirovohrad) due to severe damage to production buildings, technical equipment and storage facilities as a result of Russian strikes amid the ongoing conflict. The purchase of seeds had been suspended, but the company would continue to ship existing stocks from its storage facilities.
