= Vysoki Bairaky =

Vysoki Bairaky Високі Байраки
- Village
- Location in Ukraine Vysoki Bairaky (Ukraine Kirovohrad Oblast)
- Coordinates: 48°36′21″N 32°20′34″E
- Country: Ukraine
- Oblast: Kirovohrad Oblast
- District: Kropyvnytskyi Raion
- Founded: 1886
- Elevation: 147 m (482 ft)

Population (2021)
  - Total: 917
- Time zone: UTC+2 (EET)
  - Summer (DST): UTC+3 (EEST)
- Postal code: 27601
- Area code: +380 522
- Climate: Dfa

Vysoki Bairaky (Ukrainian: Високі Байраки) is a village in central Ukraine in Kropyvnytskyi Raion, Kirovohrad Oblast.

== Demographics ==
According to the 1989 census, the population of Vysoki Bairaky was 952 people, of whom 431 were men and 521 women.

Native language as of the Ukrainian Census of 2001:

- Ukrainian 95.80%
- Russian 3.09%
- Romani 0.88%
- Belarusian 0.22%
