= Andriy Verevskyi =

Ukrainian oligarch

- Андрій Веревський
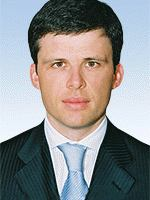
- Official portrait, 2012

People's Deputy of Ukraine
- In office 14 May 2002 – 5 March 2013
- Preceded by: Hryhoriy Omelchenko
- Succeeded by: Constituency abolished
- Constituency: Poltava Oblast, No. 146 (2002–2006); Yulia Tymoshenko Bloc, No. 44 (2006–2012); Party of Regions, No. 46 (2012–2013)

Personal details
- Born: 24 July 1974 (age 52) Poltava, Ukrainian SSR, Soviet Union (Now Ukraine)
- Party: Party of Regions
- Other political affiliations: For United Ukraine! (2002–2004); Yulia Tymoshenko Bloc (2004–2010); Batkivshchyna (2004–2010)
- Education: National Agrarian University

Andriy Mykhailovych Verevskyi (Ukrainian: Андрій Михайлович Веревський; born 25 July 1974) is a Ukrainian oligarch, founder and chairman of the board of Kernel, a Ukrainian diversified agri company. Verevskyi is a former People's Deputy of Ukraine, representing Ukraine's 146th electoral district in Poltava Oblast from 2002 to 2006 before subsequently being elected from the proportional lists of the Yulia Tymoshenko Bloc and the Party of Regions from 2006 until 2012. He was a member of the Agrarian Policy and Land Relations Committee.

== Education and career ==
Verevskiy graduated with a bachelor's degree in agronomics from the National Agrarian University and is an Oxford College graduate. In 1995, he founded a small grain trading enterprise focusing on grain exports out of Ukraine, which through the years grew into the present Kernel. Chairman of the board and majority shareholder of Kernel Holding S.A. since 2007.

== Business ==
Verevskiy is the founder, largest shareholder and Chairman of the board of Kernel Holding S.A. since 2007. Kernel Holding S.A. is an agri-business value chain management company operating in Ukraine, providing production, processing, storage, transshipment and export of agricultural commodities, the company supplies grain, sunflower oil (35% of Ukraine's market and meal produced in Ukraine and Russia; the largest supplier of bottled sunflower oil to the Ukrainian market; provider of grain silo services to farmers, and provider of services for the transshipment and export of grain, oil and meal from Black Sea ports.

Kernel Holding S.A. completed the initial public offering (IPO) on the Warsaw Stock Exchange (WSE) raising $221 million in November 2007. Since the debut on the WSE the market capitalisation of the company has tripled and reached US$2 billion in 2011. The IPO of Kernel Holding S.A. was named the Best IPO in Central and Eastern Europe on the WSE. Kernel is a member of WIG20 index of the Warsaw Stock Exchange. In 2023 Kernel Holding announced the delisting of the company from Warsaw Stock Exchange. The delisting was described as a cynical move to push out minority shareholders which could undermine foreign funding for the postwar reconstruction of Ukraine.

In 2012, US Forbes Magazine valued Verevskyi's net worth at US$1 billion. In April 2016 the Ukrainian magazine Focus estimated his wealth at $642 million.

== Political career ==
Verevskyi was first elected to the Verkhovna Rada (Ukrainian parliament) in the 2002 Ukrainian parliamentary election, representing Ukraine's 146th electoral district in Poltava Oblast. He was a member of the Verkhovna Rada Finance and Banking Committee. Until December 2004, member of the For United Ukraine! faction, European Choice group and Regions of Ukraine faction. He defected to the Yulia Tymoshenko Bloc in June 2005, and was subsequently re-elected to the Verkhovna Rada in 2006 and 2007 as the 44th candidate on the proportional list of the Yulia Tymoshenko Bloc. In both convocations of the Verkhovna Rada he was a member of the Agrarian Policy and Land Relations Committee. During this time, he was a member of the Batkivshchyna party.

In June 2010, Verevskyi crossed to the Stability and Reform coalition formed by the Party of Regions, Lytvyn Bloc and Communist Party factions. Since October 2010, member of the Party of Regions faction.

Verevskiy was placed at number 46 on the proportional list of Party of Regions during the 2012 Ukrainian parliamentary election. He was re-elected into parliament. The Higher Administrative Court of Ukraine stripped Verevskyi of his seat in parliament on 5 March 2013 because he simultaneously was parliamentary deputy and headed a commercial entity.

== Personal life ==
Andrey is married and has two sons and a daughter.
