= Kalynivka, Fastiv Raion, Kyiv Oblast =

Rural locality in Kyiv Oblast, Ukraine

Kalynivka Калинівка
- Rural settlement
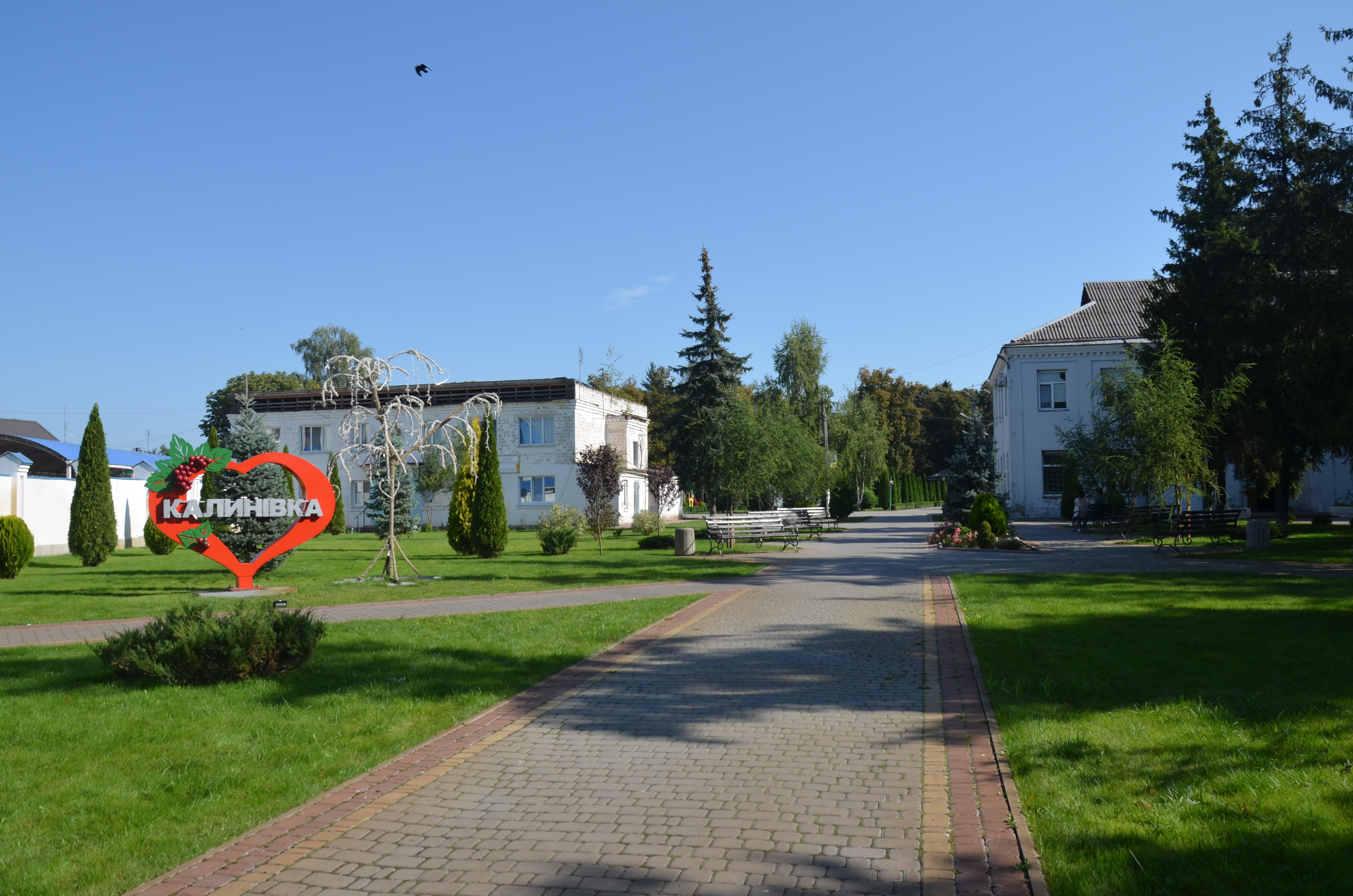
- A park in Kalynivka

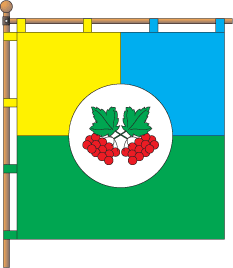
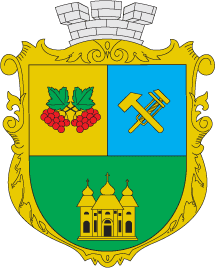
- Flag Coat of arms

- Location of Kalynivka in Ukraine Kalynivka (Ukraine)
- Coordinates: 50°13′32″N 30°13′55″E
- Country: Ukraine
- Oblast: Kyiv Oblast
- Raion: Fastiv Raion
- Hromada: Kalynivka settlement hromada
- Founded: 1957

Government
  - Town Head: Andriy Karpyna

Population (2001)
  - Total: 5,704
- Time zone: UTC+2 (EET)
  - Summer (DST): UTC+3 (EEST)
- Postal code: 08624
- Area code: +380 4571
- Website: http://rada.gov.ua/

Kalynivka (Ukrainian: Калинівка) is a rural settlement in Fastiv Raion (district) of Kyiv Oblast (region) in northern Ukraine. It hosts the administration of Kalynivka settlement hromada, one of the hromadas of Ukraine. Its population was 5,704 as of the 2001 Ukrainian Census. Current population: 5,166 (2022 estimate).

== History ==
Until 18 July 2020, Kalynivka belonged to Vasylkiv Raion. The raion was abolished that day as part of the administrative reform of Ukraine, which reduced the number of raions of Kyiv Oblast to seven. The area of Vasylkiv Raion was split between Bila Tserkva, Fastiv, and Obukhiv Raions, with Kalynivka being transferred to Fastiv Raion.

Until 26 January 2024, Kalynivka was designated an urban-type settlement. On this day, a new law entered into force which abolished this status, and Kalynivka became a rural settlement.
