= Volodymyr Kostelman =

Volodymyr Mykhailovych Kostelman
- Володимир Михайлович Костельман
- Born: 13 November 1972 (age 53); Dnipropetrovsk, Ukrainian SSR, USSR
- Education: National Metallurgical Academy of Ukraine
- Occupations: Singer, entrepreneur

Volodymyr Kostelman (born 13 November 1972, in Dnipro, Ukraine) is a Ukrainian entrepreneur, musician, and CEO of Fozzy Group, a millionaire. In 2020, Forbes Ukraine ranked him 42nd among the richest Ukrainians, with an estimated net worth of $215 million.

== Early life and education ==
Kostelman studied at the Tyumen Industrial Institute. In 1997, he graduated from the State Metallurgical Academy of Ukraine in Dnipro with a degree in Automation of Metallurgical Processes and Production. In 2001, he obtained a qualification in Organization Management from the Central Institute of Postgraduate Pedagogical Education at the Academy of Pedagogical Sciences of Ukraine.

== Career ==
Kostelman began his entrepreneurial career in 1992, initially working in the retail trade of coffee, tea, chocolate, and cigarettes. In 1997, he established Fozzy Group and opened the first Fozzy Cash & Carry hypermarket. By 1998, the first Silpo supermarket was opened.

In 2000, Nizhyn Cannery LLC became part of Fozzy Group. In 2002, the first Fora, a convenience store with a product range suited to everyday needs, was opened. In 2008, the Bila Romashka pharmacy chain was launched. In 2012, the first Le Silpo delicatessen market opened. In 2014, the Silpo Voyage travel agency network was established.

In 2016, Kostelman, in partnership with photographer Kyrylo Kislyako, opened the bar BarmanDictat. That same year, Fozzy Group launched the THRASH! TRASH! retail chain and opened the POSITANO restaurant-pizzeria, recognized by Gambero Rosso in 2021 as one of the best Italian cuisine venues in Ukraine.

In 2018, the Escobar and Who&Why.Drinkery restaurants opened. In 2021, Kostelman launched the network of modern sports clubs APOLLO NEXT, the MAUDAU marketplace, and the E-ZOO pet store chain. In 2022, Fozzy Group introduced the MINK online dry cleaning service, and the LOKO express grocery delivery service. In 2024, the company opened the Doctor Sam medical center in Kyiv.

He has business partners Roman Chyhir, Oleg Sotnikov, and Yuriy Hnatenko.

== Personal life ==
Kostelman writes poetry. In 1988, he co-founded the poetry group Poé Boé with Roman Chyhir. He is also a financial supporter of the international poetry festival Kyiv Laurels. From 2001 to 2015, he was the lead vocalist and guitarist of Remont Vody, a band he founded with Roman Chyhir and Oleh Sotnykov. Since 2015, he has been performing as the lead vocalist and guitarist of Gybky Chaplyn.

Kostelman is unmarried and has six children.
