= Inzhur =

- Type: Investment REIT company
- Founded: February 14, 2022
- Founder: Andriy Zhurzhiy
- Headquarters: 48, 50A Zhylianska Street, Kyiv, Ukraine
- Total assets: ▲2.70 billion UAH as of April, 2025
- Owner: Andriy Zhurzhiy
- Website: https://www.inzhur.reit/

Inzhur is an investment REIT company that unites small investors for the co-ownership of large-scale real estate. It is the first Ukrainian REIT company certified by NAREIT (National Association of Real Estate Investment Trusts) and EPRA (European Public Real Estate Association).

As of March 2026, Inzhur reports 60,568 active accounts and 5,690,974,123 UAH in assets under management.

== History ==
The company was founded on February 14, 2022, based on the REIT model. Its first investment fund was "Inzhur 1001," focused on a supermarket premises in Lisnyky, which attracted $1.3 million in investment within its first 10 days.

The company conducts an annual audit by Deloitte and an asset valuation by Baker Tilly, a member of the "Big Four".

On August 29, 2025, the National Securities and Stock Market Commission authorized the merger of five existing investment funds into the unified Inzhur REIT. Following this consolidation, the company reduced the minimum investment threshold to 10 UAH.

In November 2025, Inzhur announced the launch of its own stock exchange to facilitate the trading of investment instruments.

In December 2025, Inzhur REIT completed the acquisition of the Sky Park shopping and entertainment center in Vinnytsia from investment group Dragon Capital for more than 1.5 billion Ukrainian hryvnias, following approval by the Antimonopoly Committee of Ukraine.

The company has also been involved in disputes surrounding the delayed privatization of the Ocean Plaza shopping mall. In September 2025 the Kyiv Court of Appeal prohibited Inzhur Energy from continuing construction of a power plant near Kyiv, but later allowed it.

== Operations ==
As of 2026, the company's ecosystem consists of two primary real estate and infrastructure funds (Inzhur REIT and Inzhur Energy), while also providing retail access to Ukrainian government bonds (OVDP).

As of early 2026, Inzhur REIT manages a diversified portfolio of commercial real estate and land assets centered on high-traffic retail locations. Its operational holdings as of late 2025 included the Sky Park shopping mall in Vinnytsia, seven operational retail sites leased to major national chains such as Silpo, Fora, Comfy, and Masterzoo, and three operational McDonald’s restaurants. The fund’s development pipeline includes two additional Fora supermarkets, two McDonald’s locations, and a retail park anchored by a Novus supermarket. Furthermore, the fund is in the final stages of acquiring a major shopping center in a regional capital located west of Kyiv. The REIT's revenue model is based on monthly rental income from established corporate tenants and the long-term capital appreciation of its property holdings.

Inzhur Energy focuses on the construction and management of maneuverable gas-piston power plants designed to provide grid stability services. Revenue for this fund is generated through service agreements with the National Energy Company Ukrenergo, specifically for balancing and auxiliary power services. While the REIT distributes monthly dividends to its investors, Inzhur Energy operates on a capitalization-only model, where profits are reinvested into infrastructure expansion to increase the net asset value of investment certificates.

Additionally, the company operates as a market maker for Government Internal Loan Bonds (OVDP), providing a high-liquidity platform with minimal spreads and zero commission. This service is positioned as a higher-yield alternative to traditional bank deposits, allowing for the immediate purchase and sale of government securities.
