= List of supermarket chains in Ukraine =

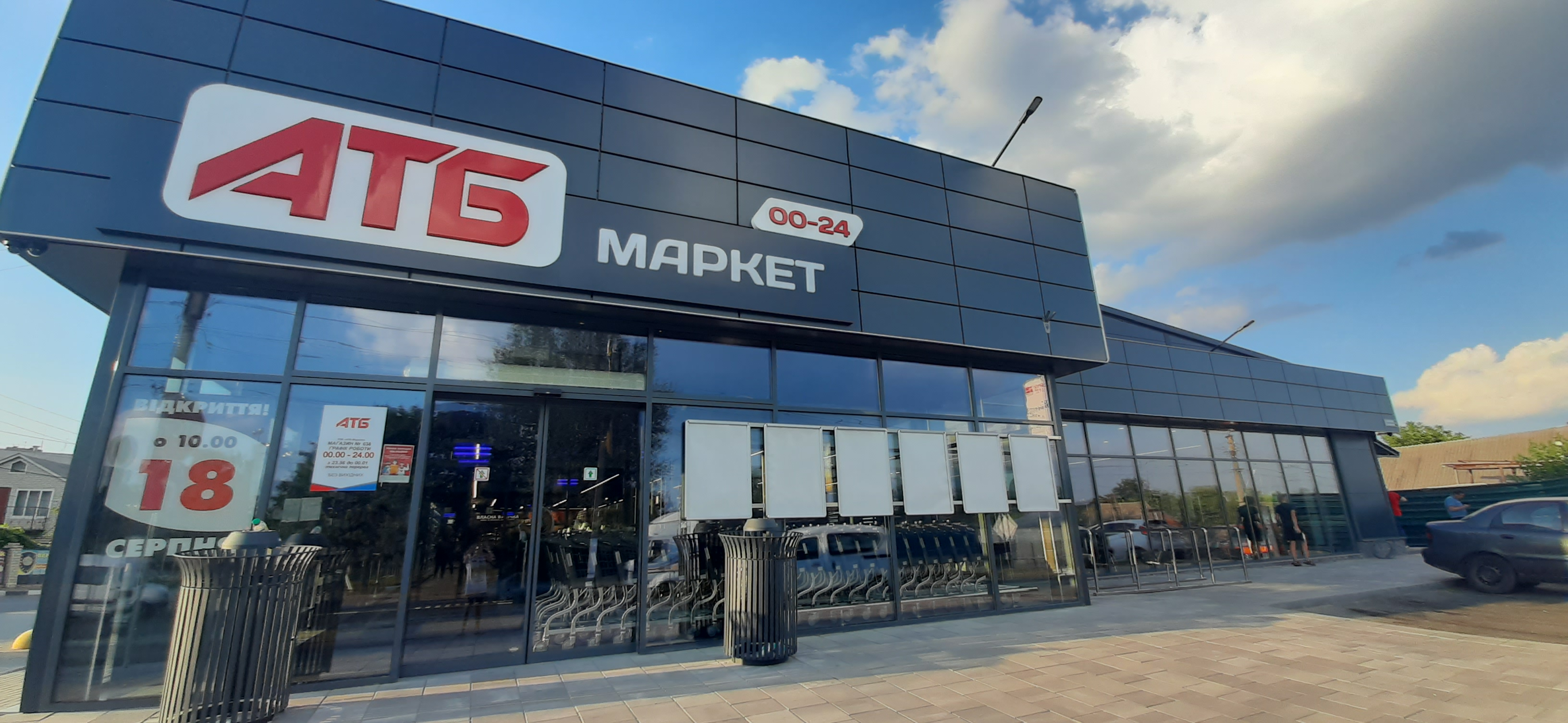
ATB-Market, Pisochyn, Kharkiv region, 2021

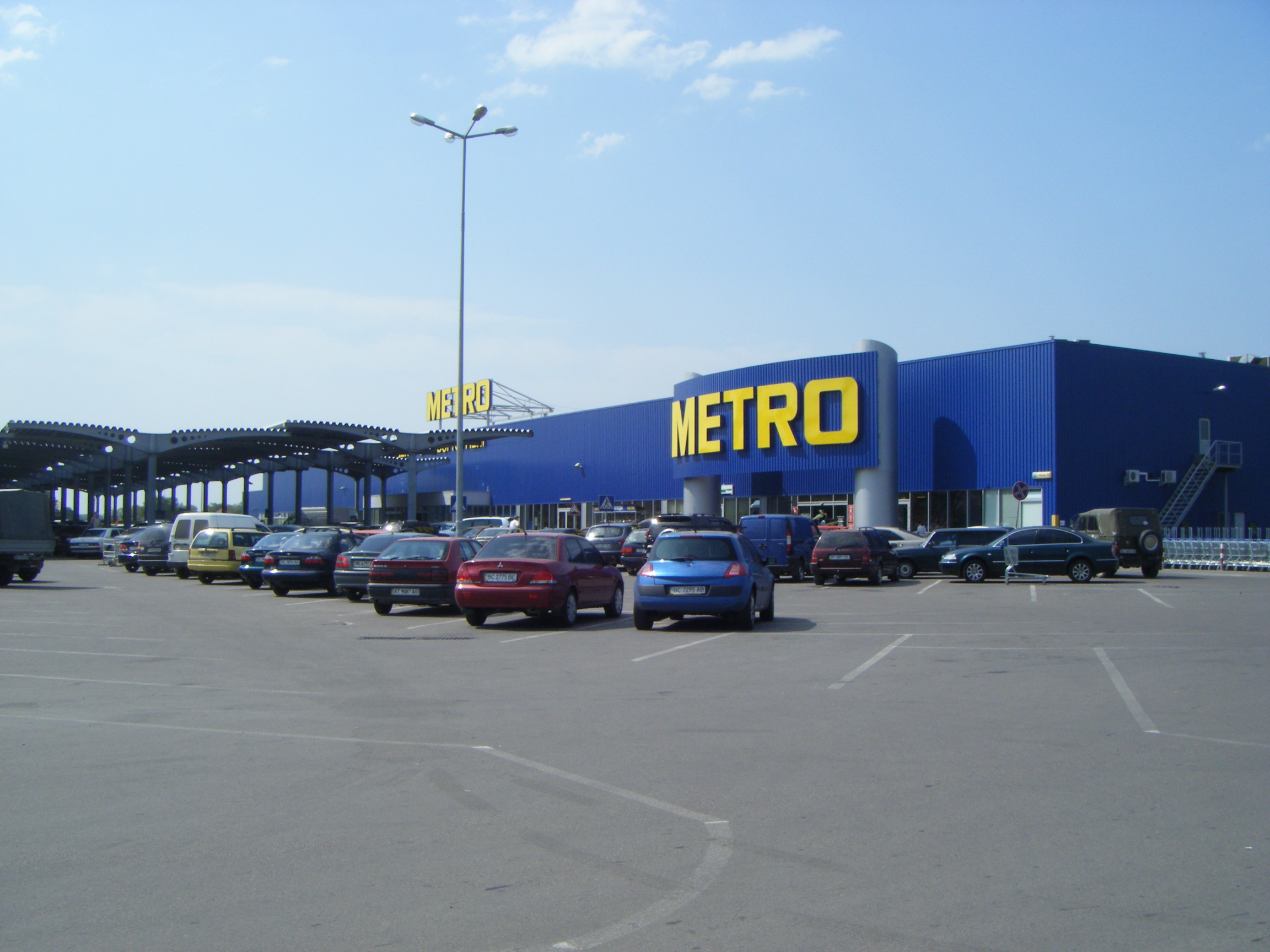
Metro Cash and Carry located in Lviv, Ukraine

This is a list of supermarket chains in Ukraine.

== Supermarkets ==
=== Active ===
Name	Origin	Year founded	Parent	Stores
Amstor	Ukraine	2003	Smart Holding	13
Arsen	Ukraine	2002	Eurotek	
ATB-Express	Ukraine	2018	ATB Corporation	
ATB-Market	Ukraine	1998	ATB Corporation	1,319
Badyoryi	Ukraine	2019	NEDLES	
Basket	Ukraine	2011	Basket Trade	12
Blyzenko	Ukraine	2017	Merezha-Service Lviv	144
Box Express Market	Ukraine	2020	Food Box Retail	70
Buffet	Ukraine	2021	Digma Business Group	
Chudo Market	Ukraine	2012	Chudo Market	
Delikat	Ukraine	1998	Delikat	
Delvi	Ukraine	2015	Delvi	
EKO-Market	Ukraine	2003	EKO	
Favore	Ukraine	2017	Fozzy Group	
Faino Market	Ukraine	2009	Veresen Plus	219
FOODpod	Ukraine	2020	Fozzy Group	
Fora	Ukraine	2002	Fozzy Group	379
Fresh	Ukraine	2007	Eurotek	
Green Market	Ukraine	2015	Green Market	
Kolo	Ukraine	2017	ARETAIL	
Kopiyka	Ukraine	2001	Kopiyka	
Kvartal	Ukraine	2003	Eurotek	
Le Silpo	Ukraine	2012	Fozzy Group	
LotOK	Ukraine	2011	LK-Trans	102
Nash Kray	Ukraine	2001	VolWest Group	221
Rukavychka	Ukraine	2003	Lvivkholod	217
Silpo	Ukraine	1998	Fozzy Group	309
Soyuz	Ukraine	1998	Eurotek	
Spar	Netherlands	2018	VolWest Group	4
Sympatyk	Ukraine	2003	EKO	
Tavria-V	Ukraine	1992	Tavria-V	
Thrash!	Ukraine	2017	Fozzy Group	
Varus	Ukraine	2003	Weygant Enterprises Limited	58
Velyka Kyshenia	Ukraine	2000	Retail Group	27
VK Express	Ukraine	2012	Retail Group	
VK Select	Ukraine	2011	Retail Group	1

=== Closed ===
Name	Origin	Year founded	Year dissolved	Parent	Stores
Absolyut	Ukraine	2002	2021	LIA	34
Barvinok	Ukraine	2001	2016	Eurotek	35
Billa	Austria	2000	2021	REWE Group	35
Brusnychka	Ukraine	2006	2019	Ukrainskyi Retail	
Bumi-Market	Ukraine	2002	2007	BM Trade	
Digma Food Market	Ukraine	2004	2021	Digma Business Group	30
Dnipryanka	Ukraine	2002	2019	Dnipryanka	
Furshet	Ukraine	1992	2021	Retail Center	45
PAKKO	Ukraine	2003	2020	HIPPO	10
Vopak	Ukraine	1999	2020	HIPPO	69

== Hypermarkets ==
Name	Origin	Year founded	Parent	Stores
Auchan	France		Auchan	23
Fozzy	Ukraine		Fozzy Group	9
Metro Cash & Carry	Germany	2003	Metro AG	33
MegaMarket	Ukraine	2001	MegaMarket	5
Novus	Ukraine	2008	BT Invest	40
Ultramarket	Ukraine	2021	Ultramarket	4
Velmart	Ukraine	2010	Retail Group	
ZaTak	Ukraine	2020	ZaTak	

== Other retailers ==
- Favoryt
- Intermarket
- West Line (supermarket chain)

== Speciality chains ==
=== Home Appliances, Electronics and Mobile stores ===
Name	Stores	Parent
ALLO	345 (Sept 2021)	ALLO
Citrus		
Comfy		
Eldorado	130 (Aug 2020)	
Foxtrot		Foxtrot
MOYO		
Rozetka.ua		

=== Furniture stores ===
Name	Stores	Parent
Jysk	29	Jysk
IKEA	1	IKEA

=== Bookstore retailers ===
Name	Stores	Parent
Bukva		
Knyharnia Ye (Книгарня Є)	20+	
Knyholend		
