= Andriy Zhurzhiy =

Ukrainian politician

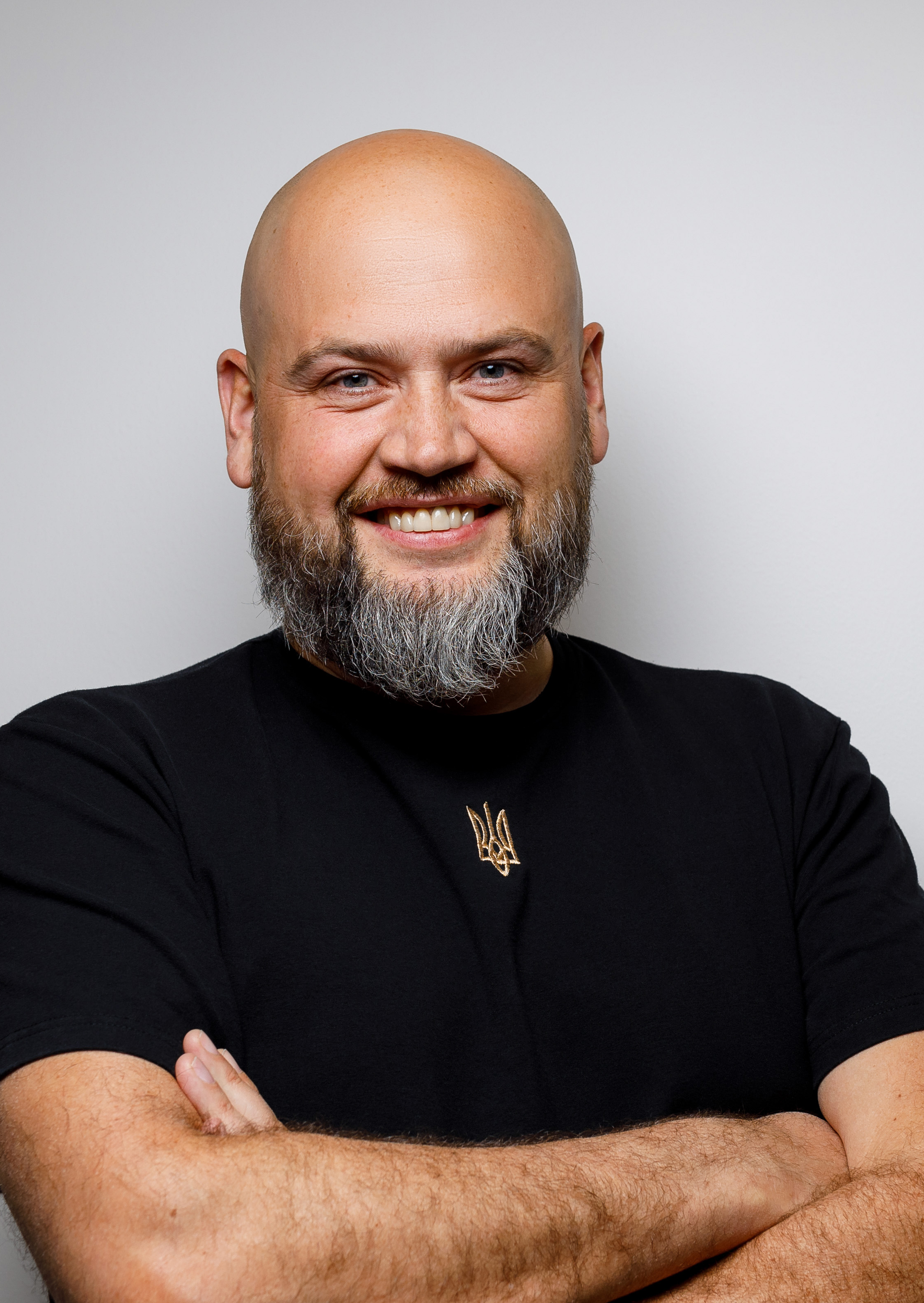
- In office 27 November 2014 – 29 August 2019

Personal details
- Born: 19 March 1978 (age 48) Uman
- Party: Samopomich Union
- Education: Odesa Academy of Law
- Occupation: Founder and ceo of the investment reit company inzhur

Andriy Valeriyovych Zhurzhiy (born 19 March 1978) is a Ukrainian entrepreneur, investor, and lawyer. He is the founder and CEO of the investment REIT company Inzhur. Zhurzhiy served as a member of Ukraine's Parliament of the 8th convocation from Self Reliance party

== Biography ==
=== Legal career (2005—2014) ===
From 2005 and until 2014 Zhurzhiy worked as the Director of the Law Department at Fozzy Group. Additionally, he was the president of Investment Partners Group. Zhurzhiy's Law Department in the Fozzy Group has been recognised as the best in FMCG by the newspaper Legal Practice in 2008, 2009, 2010, 2013. In 2008 and 2013 was named the best corporate lawyer by the newspaper Legal Practice. The same newspaper has named Zhurzhiy one of the three best lawyer in taxation. In 2013 Russian journal Corporate Lawyer has named the Law Department of Fozzy Group the best among trade companies law departments in CIS.

=== Business career (2008—present) ===
In 2008, he founded the asset management company "Investment Partners". In 2009, he founded Inzhur Capitals – an official depository institution that deals with the sale and storage of securities. As of 2024, the total amount of concluded securities transactions reached ₴65 billion.

In 2016, he founded Smile Development (now Inzhur) — a construction company that, as of early 2024, has built 39 commercial premises for "Silpo", "Fora", and McDonald's, as well as 19 sections of the RC "Optimisto" (another 6 sections are currently under construction).

In 2022, 10 days before the full-scale invasion of Ukraine by Russia, Andriy Zhurzhiy launched Inzhur – Ukraine's first investment company operating under the REIT business model, which allows private investors to buy shares in large and profitable real estate objects and receive dividends from rental payments. In the first 10 days, Inzhur attracted $1.3 million in investments for the startup project – a supermarket in Lisnyky. As of May 2024, the company has launched 6 investment funds, 4 of which have already been fully sold. Available as of July is the Inzhur Zhytniy fund and Inzhur Ocean for the buyout of the Ocean Plaza shopping center from the state.

=== Political career (2014—2018) ===
From 27 November 2014, to July 2018, he was an MP of the 8th convocation of the Verkhovna Rada of Ukraine, a member of the parliamentary faction Union "Self Reliance", and the first deputy head of the Committee on Tax and Customs Policy.

In this position, he primarily focused on lobbying new laws for Ukrainian businesses. In particular, these include the law on public procurement (Prozorro), the law on reducing tax pressure (reducing the USC on wages), and opposition to the restoration of the tax police.

In 2017, he was one of the initiators of the law ensuring the functioning of the Ukrainian language as the state language. In July 2018, he submitted a resignation request on his own accord.

In 2024, the publication NV.ua included Andriy Zhurzhiy in the list of "100 People of the Decade", which brings together Ukrainian citizens who played a key role in the life of the country since 2014 – for lobbying the Prozorro public procurement reform.

== Civil activities ==
He is an active participant in the public campaign to save the Zhytniy Market. On 19 March 2024, the Kyiv Department of Municipal Property announced an auction to find a tenant for Zhytniy Market with a starting price of ₴2.5 million, and the auction was scheduled for 25 March. After its postponement due to public campaign pressure, Andriy Zhurzhiy advocated for the cancellation of the auction, deeming it untrustworthy, and its replacement with a privatization auction.

Over the years, Andriy Zhurzhiy has been a member and headed several associations and committees, including:

- Member of the Board of the Association of Lawyers of Ukraine;
- Member of the Public Council under the Antimonopoly Committee of Ukraine;
- Head of the Disciplinary Committee of the Ukrainian Association of Investment Business;
- Co-founder of the Association of Tax Advisors.

In 2023, he assisted the NGO "Fond Velykyi Lioh" in the search for the burial of Bohdan Khmelnytsky and the archaeological excavations of the Epiphany Cathedral, where the burial of Petro Sahaidachny may be located.

== Personal life ==
Zhurzhiy is married and has three children. In 2004 he graduated from the Odesa Academy of Law.
