= ATB-Market =

Ukrainian retail trade company

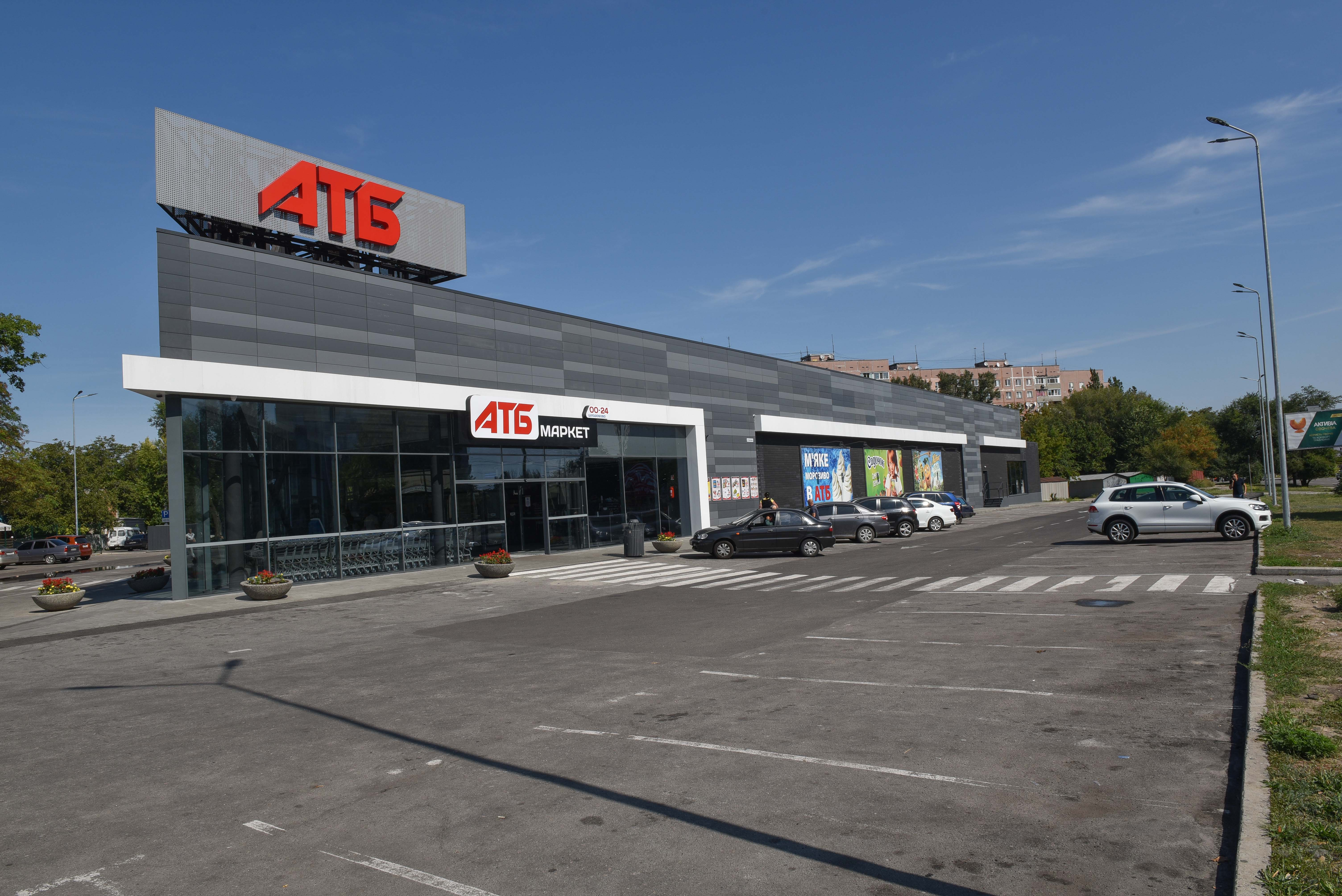
- Type: Limited liability company
- Industry: Retail (Grocery)
- Founded: 1993
- Headquarters: Dnipro, Ukraine
- Key people: Borys Markov (managing director) Hennadiy Butkevych (co-owner)
- Products: Foodstuffs and essential nonfood commodities
- Revenue: 294.2 billion ₴ (2025)
- Total assets: 54,530,397,000 hryvnia (2025)
- Number of employees: 48,500 (2025)
- Website: www.atbmarket.com

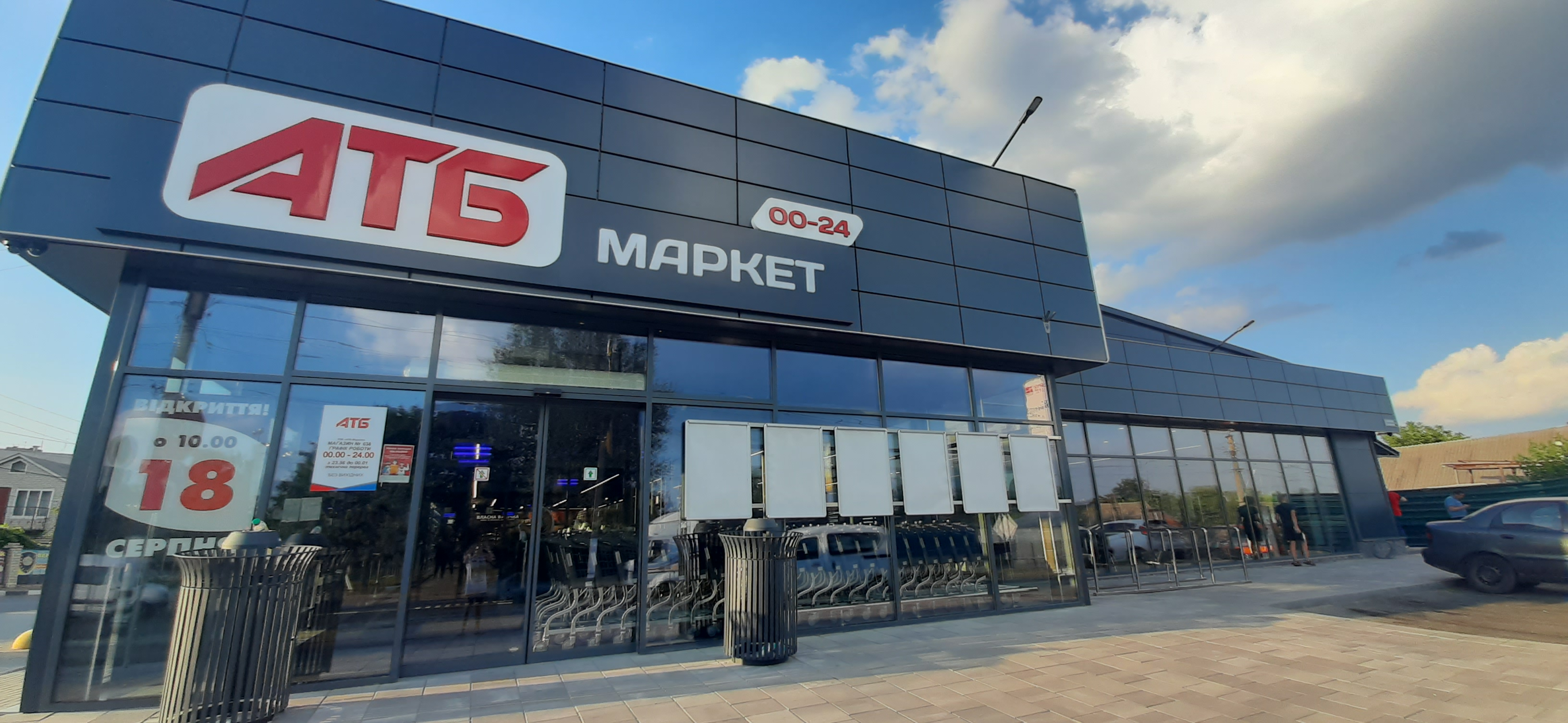
Updated store design

ATB-Market LLC (Ukrainian: АТБ-Маркет) is one of the leading retail trade companies in Ukraine. The company owns the largest national network of retail shops. The managing director is Borys Markov.

The company's shops operate in the "soft discounter" mode. The range of offered goods comprises ca. 3,500 articles. ATB discounters trade foodstuffs and essential nonfood commodities.

== History ==
ATB-Market was founded in 1993 in Dnipro as a group of six groceries. In 1998, the company received its current name ATB – a short name of AgroTechBusiness.

After the Russian invasion of Ukraine in 2022, the company lost 65 stores in the Kherson and Zaporizhzhia oblasts.

== Stores ==
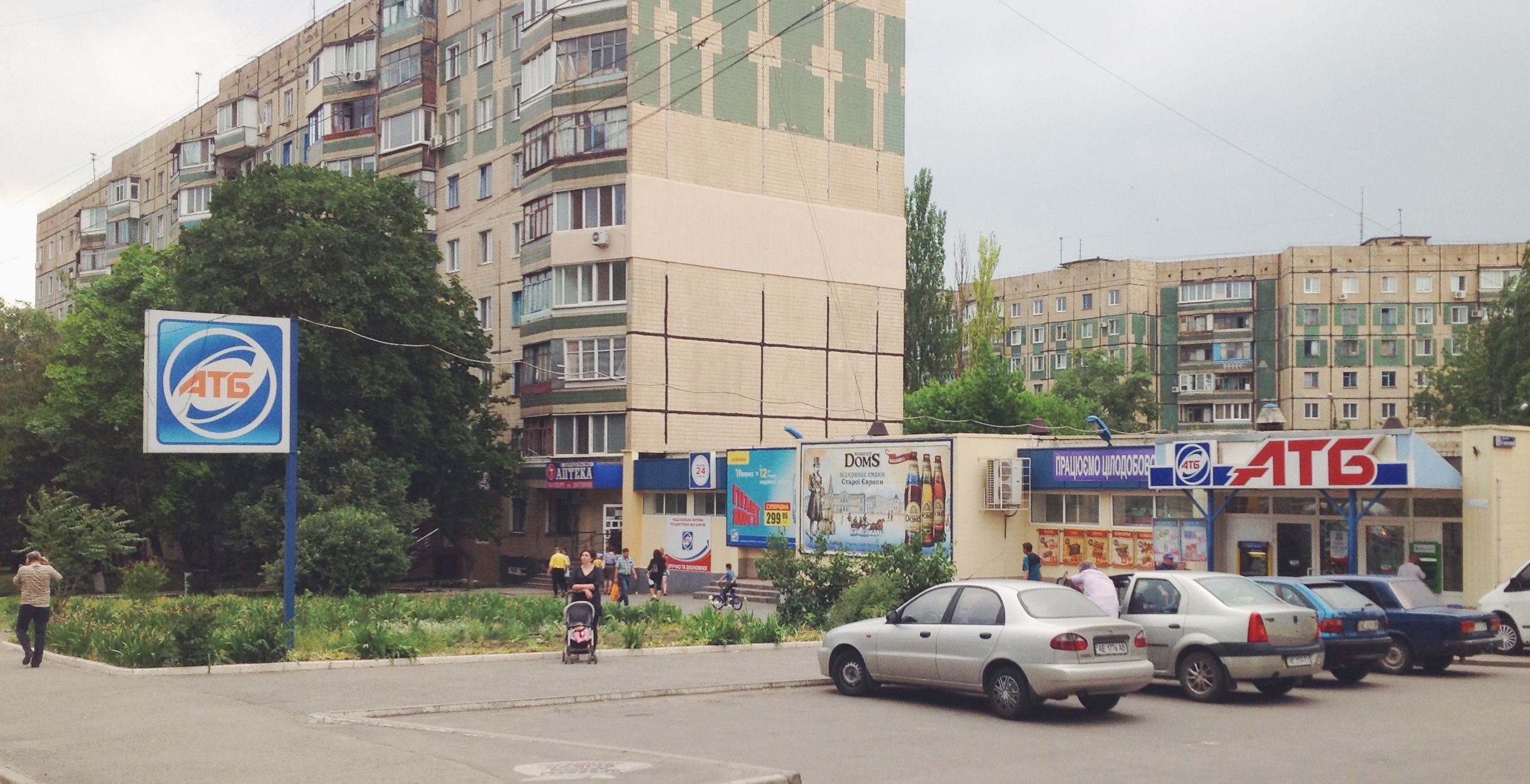
The exterior of the ATB store in Kryvyi Rih.

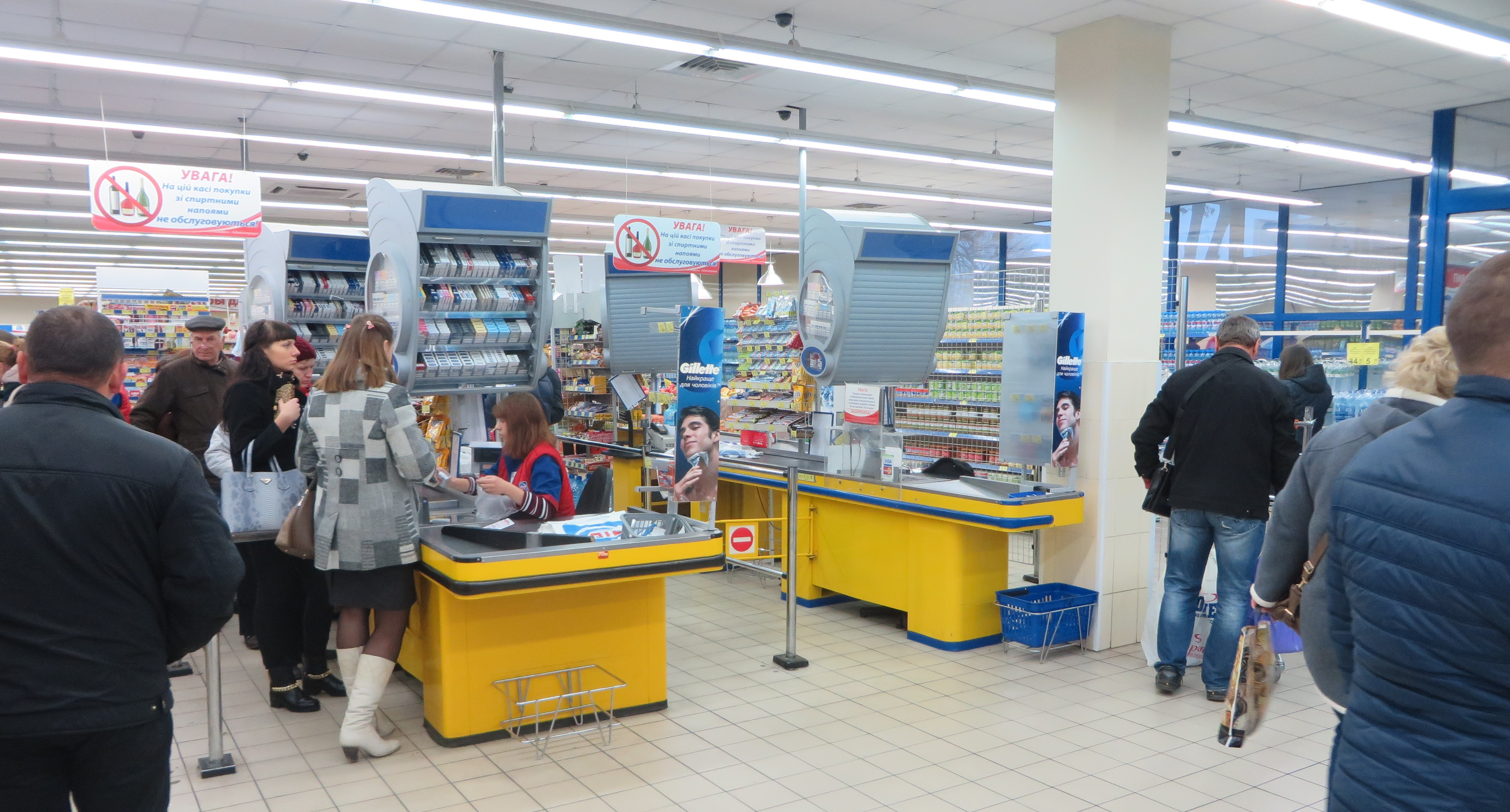
Inside a typical ATB store

As of early 2024, the ATB retail chain operated 1,207 stores across 24 regions of Ukraine. For the last four years [when?], the company has been showing the highest rate of expansion in Ukraine. In 2006 year 50 ATB discounter shops were launched in Ukraine, in 2007 – 52 shops, in 2008 – 75 and in 2009 – 83 shops, respectively. In 2009, the company was officially recognized as a retail trade leader due to its drastic expansion.

== Logistics ==
Development of own logistics service is of particular interest to ATB Market. The company is the owner of the largest national logistics complex comprising four B-category distribution centers, three of them are located in Dnipro city, and one in Donetsk. The monthly volume of the goods turnover processed by the distribution centers of ATB Market is 70,000 tons. The warehouse complex ensures supplies to all the shops of ATB trade network by planning, organizing and recording the commodity flows in the territory of Central, Eastern, Northern and Southern Ukraine. Further development of the company's logistics base is planned to be carried out in 2010. Two large regional distribution centers are planned to be built. One of them shall be servicing the shops located in the Southern regions of Ukraine, the other – those operating in the Northern regions of the country.

== Management and turnover ==
In its management, the company uses the experience gained by the "classical" European discounters such as Aldi and Lidl. Goods turnover of ATB retail network in 2009 amounted 8.9 billion Ukrainian hryvnas (VAT inclusive).

More than 1 million Ukrainians do their shopping in ATB every day, and over 350 million shoppers are served yearly by the retail network.

== ATB in the Donbas Region and Crimea ==
ATB stores in the territory occupied by Donetsk People's Republic were seized to form a new supermarket chain called "The First Republican Supermarket" (rus. Первый Республиканский Супермаркет) while stores in the territory occupied by Luhansk People's Republic were seized to form a new supermarket chain called People's [supermarket] (rus. "Народный"). ATBs in Crimea were seized by Russians to create "PNH" (Products Near Home) (rus. "ПУД" (Продукты У Дома)), a supermarket with a similar logo and inside of the market to ATB. Later, Art. Lebedev Studio developed a new logo.

== See also ==
- List of supermarket chains in Ukraine
