= Boris Muzalev =

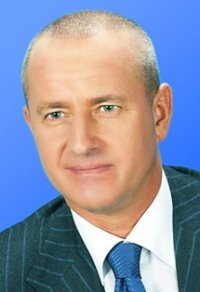
- Born: April 13, 1959 (age 67); Odesa, Ukraine
- Education: Odesa National Medical University
- Occupation: CEO of Tavria-V
- Website: http://www.tavriav.ua

Boris Muzalev (born April 13, 1959) is a Ukrainian-born businessman and politician. Muzalev is the CEO of Tavria-V and the honorary consul of Cyprus.

== Business ==
Muzalev's other interests include a chain of hypermarkets and luxury supermarkets. According to Forbes Russia in 2013 his main business operation Tavria-V reported revenue of $3.7 billion and a profit of $7.2 million ranking it among the largest companies in Ukraine. In 2012 the year prior Forbes ranked Boris Muzalev as the richest man in Odesa (Ukraine's third largest city, with an estimated net worth of $209 million. His supermarket chain Tavria-V occupies almost 40% of the retail market of Odesa.

== Politics ==
Muzalev is a member of the Socialist Party of Ukraine, the first secretary of the regional committee of Odesa STCs deputy Odesa Regional Council.

== Career ==
Upon graduating from Odesa Medical Institute (1981), he then became a pediatrician working in hospitals Kirovograd and Odesa regions. In 1993 he became the founder of the supermarket chain, LLC "Tavria V". In 1995 he founded the company "Dream", which today is a consultant for Foreign Affairs and chairman of the Supervisory Board. In 1997, Muzalev becomes deputy city council Illichevsk, in 2001, was re-elected for a second term. Since 2005 he has been a member of the Socialist Party of Ukraine (SPU). Since 2006 he has been a member of the Odesa Regional Council, in the same year he was elected first secretary of the regional committee of the Socialist Party of Odesa. In 2011 Muzalev prematurely terminated his powers of a deputy in connection with the appointment of Honorary Consul of Cyprus in the Odesa region. In addition to the network of supermarkets Tavria-V Muzalev develops delicatessen stores "Space" is the leader of the project "Victory Gardens" in Odesa.

== Achievements ==
Muzalev awarded an honorary distinction of the Socialist Party of Ukraine third degree, Diploma of the Ministers of Ukraine "For outstanding contribution to the reform of the national economy, business development, market infrastructure, high achievements in their professional activity and in honor of the entrepreneur" (2004 ). In 2011, the magazine Forbes gave Muzaleva 18 among the largest Ukrainian rentier estimated its rental income of $16 million in the list of the "100 richest people in Ukraine," the same publication Muzalev takes place No.62. In 2012, his fortune is estimated at $172 million by Magazine Focus which also included Muzaleva along with his brother Michael in the ranking of the 200 richest people of Ukraine 2012 coming in at No.116 with $80million.

== See also ==
- Odesa National Medical University
- Tavria-V
