= Velyka Kyshenia =

- Native name: Велика Кишеня
- Company type: Private company
- Industry: Retail
- Founded: June 4, 2000 in Kyiv, Ukraine
- Headquarters: Kyiv, Ukraine
- Website: www.kishenya.com.ua

Velyka Kyshenia (Ukrainian: Велика Кишеня [weˈlɪkɐ kɪˈʃɛnʲɐ], lit. 'Big Pocket') is a retail group based in Kyiv, Ukraine which owns several supermarkets and hypermarkets in Ukraine and Moldova.

== History ==
The development of Velyka Kyshena began in April 2000 with the opening of the first supermarket in Kyiv on the basis of the trade operator Kviza-Trade LLC. In 2005, the company's trade turnover reached ₴1 billion 400 million. The network's revenue in 2006 amounted to ₴2.4 billion.

In early summer 2010, the "Big Pocket" network began the process of redesigning its brand.

In 2013, the main owner of one of the country's largest food chains, Retail Group, Roman Lunin, acquired four Milky Way stores owned by businessman Oleksandr Malitsky and his family and two Stolychny delis in central Kyiv. Four of the six delis are located in the Pechersk district of Kyiv. In the spring, Lunin said that in 2013 Retail Group will focus its expansion primarily on the format of "home shop" "VK Express" and premium "VK Select". These formats appeared online in 2012. Prior to the acquisition in Kyiv, there were five VK Express and two VK Select. At the same time, the CFO of Retail Group said that he would spend $ 5-10 million on expansion.

By the end of 2016, Retail Group planned to open six Velmart supermarkets worth ₴24 million by rebranding individual Velyka Kyshenya supermarkets. The total amount of Retail Group's investments in the development of the Velmart network in Ukraine in 2016 will be ₴24 million. As reported with reference to the press service of Retail Group, in 2015, two supermarkets of the "Big Pocket" chain in Obukhov and Bila Tserkva (both — Kyiv region) due to the optimization of retail space were reformatted to "Velmart" hypermarkets. Thus, the total area of Velmart hypermarkets opened in 2015 amounted to 5.5 thousand square meters.

By the end of 2021, it was planned to close four of the thirteen Velyka Kyshenya stores in Kyiv. In their place will be new points of the Velmart network. Now it has 35 stores. Both brands are owned by Roman Lunin's Retail Group. Forbes Ukraine estimated its assets at $150 million in 2021. Retail Group's revenue in 2020 amounted to ₴12.2 billion, compared to ₴11 billion a year earlier.
