= Tavria V =

Ukrainian retail group

Tavria V (Таврія В)
- Type: Private
- Industry: Retail Wholesale
- Founded: 1992
- Founder: Boris Muzalev
- Headquarters: Odesa, Ukraine
- Revenue: 2,330,799,000 hryvnia (2025)
- Total assets: 6,430,988,000 hryvnia (2025)
- Number of employees: ~5.000 (2020)
- Website: www.tavriav.org

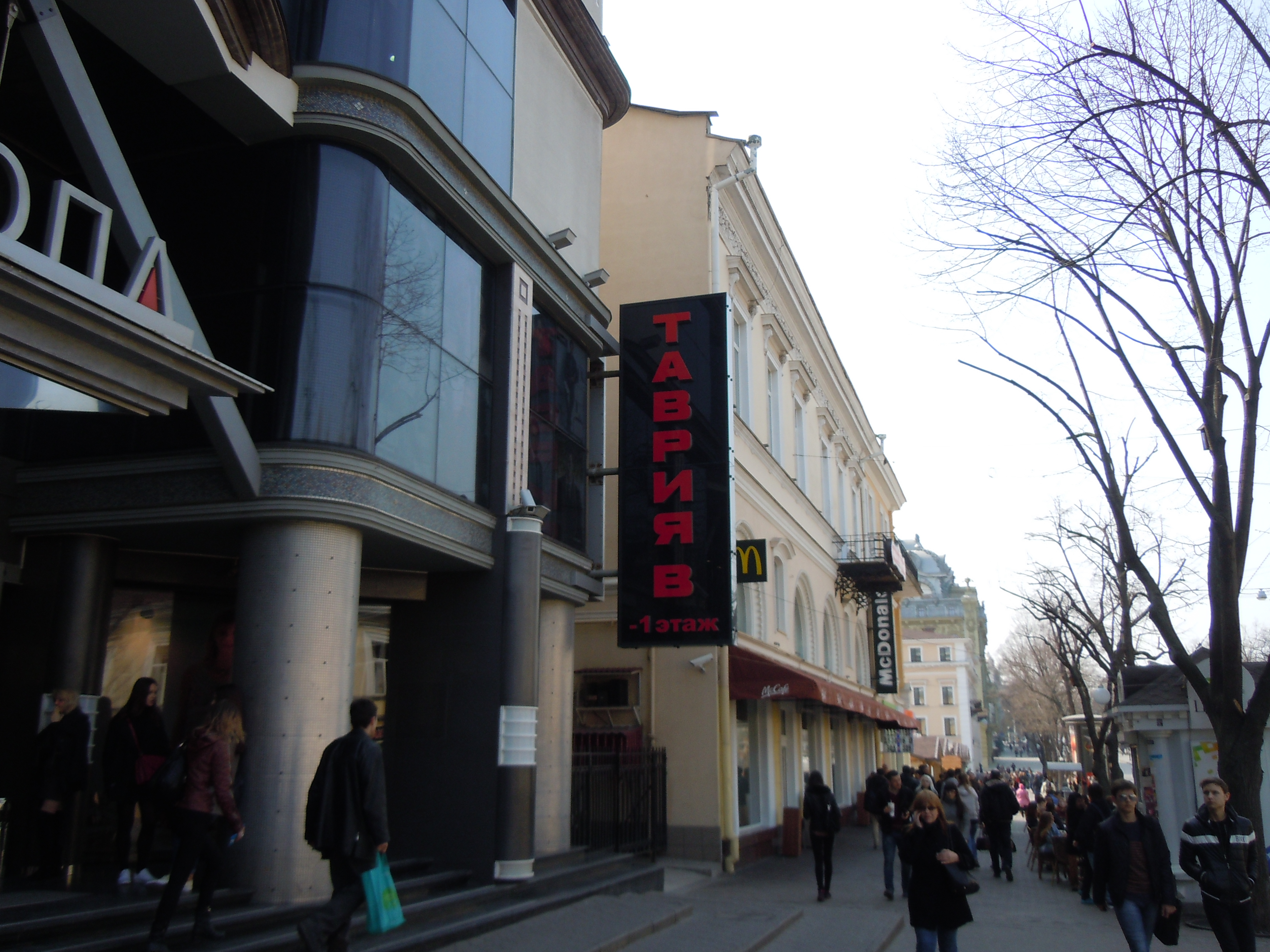
Supermarket Tavria V in Odesa

Tavria V (Ukrainian: Таврія В) is a multiformat retail group that is headquartered in Odesa, Ukraine. As of September 2025, the network of the group has 124 supermarkets. The chain also operates in Bilhorod-Dnistrovskyi, Izmail, Chornomorsk, Mykolaiv, Khmelnytskyi, Kharkiv, Kyiv, Kherson. Key areas of business include retail, wholesale, catering, production, construction and development, private label. Established in 1992, over 5,000 workers are employed. Every day, over 120,000 people shop at Tavria V shopping centers and supermarkets.

Tavria V retail chain’s target audience is urban dwellers with average and above-average incomes. The shops offer a variety of products for both higher-income and lower-income clients. The latter is achieved by having specialized departments targeted at senior citizens. The company was the first in Ukraine to implement free bus routes for Tavria V supermarket visitors. Online Home & Office Food Delivery Service for these cities in Ukraine is available.

== History ==
The first store of the company was opened in 1992 under MP "Tavria-V". The founders were two brothers, Mykhailo and Borys Muzalov, who were originally from Angarsk before moving to Odesa. In October 1996, the company was re-registered as LLC "Tavria-V". They pivoted to supermarkets after the summer of 1996 after visiting the country of Turkey and seeing the supermarket chains there. The first supermarket of the brand was opened in 1997 in Odesa under the name "Universam", and by 1997 they had additionally opened three convenience stores. The store-level names of Universam were changed in the early 2000s to Tavria, in line with the company's official name.

Their first hypermarket was opened at the Aeroportovsky shopping center in March 2002 on the site of a former plant for a total cost of $1 million. In June 2023, following the Russian invasion of Ukraine, a Kalibr cruise missile struck Odesa and hit the Tavria V warehouse there, which is the company's sole logistics warehouse for Odesa, causing a fire and destroying large amounts of the building. It also killed 3 of the company's employees. In June 2024, another Russian missile strike heavily damaged the warehouse again, destroying 20,000 of the 52,000 square miles of the building. Borys Muzalov later issued a public statement confirming that the warehouse was solely used by the company, and had never housed weapons or ammunition for the Ukrainian Armed Forces.

== Business models ==
Tavria V has multiple formats of stores, depending on location. The main types of stores they operate are hypermarkets, supermarkets, and the "Tavria V Express" format, which was launched in 2021. They also have the following less common types: Kosmos, Pyure, Blesk & Vedro, T-Sprint Cafe, Tref, and Hola Lala. Kosmos are delicatessen markets, of which there are three locations, including in Odesa and Kyiv. Pyure is a discount store that was first launched in the autumn of 2021 in Odesa, before expanding into seven stores, including in Mykolaiv, Bilhorod-Dnistrovskyi, Nikopol, and Podilsk. Blesk & Vedro is a chain of beauty stores, and they were first opened in December 2014, of which are 13 outlets currently in Odesa, Izmail, and Kharkiv. T-Sprint Cafe is a quick-service restaurant chain, although some have since been renovated into buffet-style restaurants and takeaway outlets. As of December 2022, there are 11 currently. Tref is a series of restaurants, including one with an in-house brewery opened in December 2017. The last, Hola Lola, is a fusion cuisine restaurant that was opened in August 2021 at the Sady Peremohy Shopping Center.

Private label brands that are produced by the company at the supermarkets are Eurogroup, Simmka, Subota, Natkhnennia, Didie, Nash Khlib, Kazka Smaku, Cappone, Sekretni Tekhnolohii and Ukrainska Zirka.
