= Fora =

Ukrainian supermarket chain

Fora, LLC
- Logo used since 2016
- Trade name: Фора; Favore
- Native name: ТОВ "Фора"
- Romanized name: Fora
- Type: Subsidiary
- Industry: Retail (stores near the house)
- Founded: 2002; 24 years ago
- Headquarters: Fozzy Fud, Kyiv, Ukraine
- Number of locations: 276 stores (2022)
- Area served: Ukraine
- Products: Foods and beverages
- Services: Delivery
- Revenue: 44,343,600,000 hryvnia (2025)
- Total assets: 11,968,085,000 hryvnia (2025)
- Owner: Fozzy Group
- Number of employees: 10,004 (2020)
- Website: fora.ua

Fora, LLC (Ukrainian: Фора) is a Ukrainian national retail company that operates a chain of stores Fora (also called supermarket) and premium delicacy store Favore, operated by Fozzy Group. Its headquarters are located at Fozzy Fud in neighbourhood Lisky of the Dniprovskyi District, Kyiv. Company was founded by Volodymyr Kostelman in December 2002. Most of its stores are concentrated in the Kyiv metropolitan area. The stores are partially automated, with customers able to purchase products without being checked out by a cashier using a self-service checkout.

== History ==
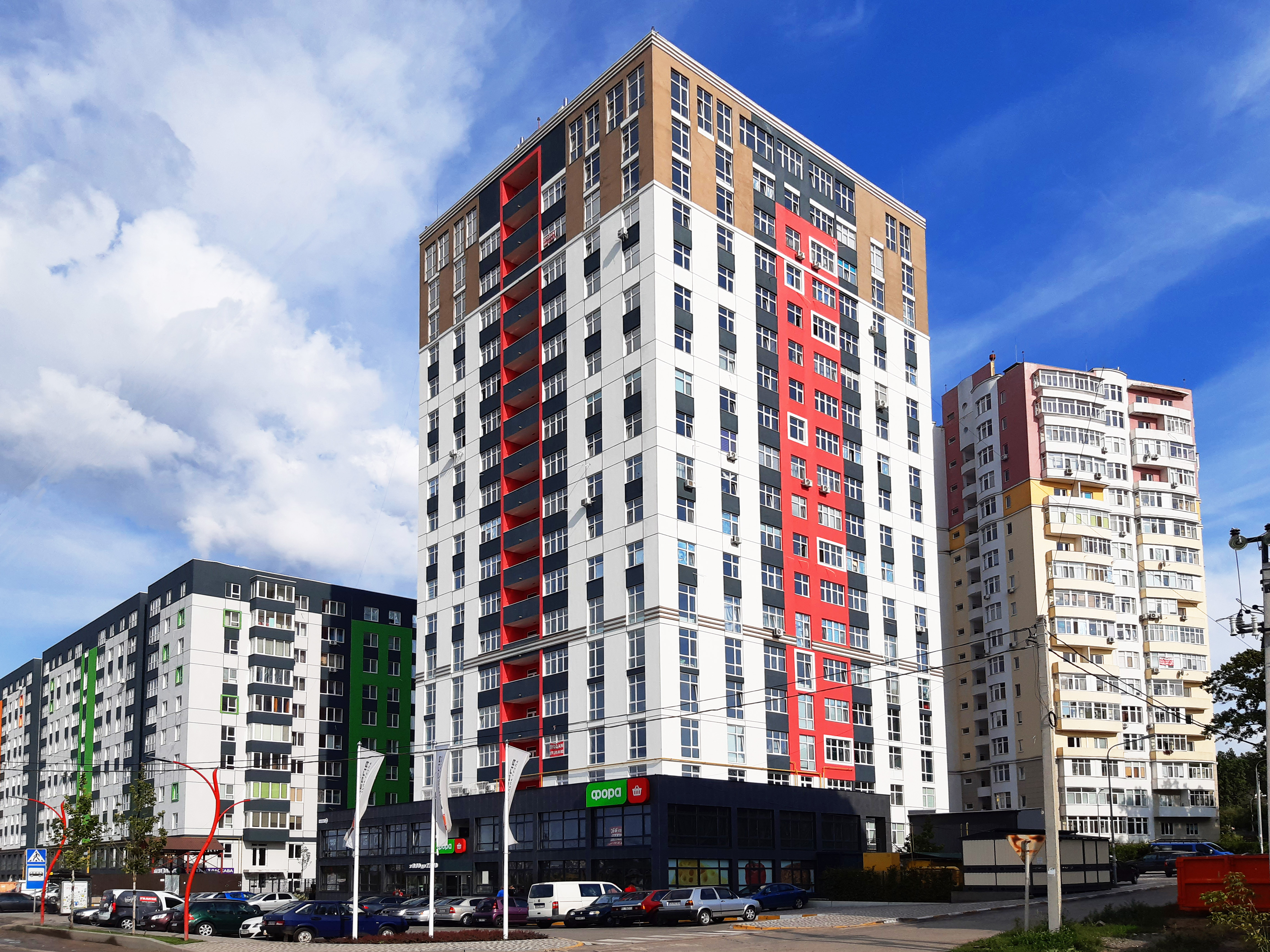
Fora store on Hryhoriia Skovorody Street in Irpin in August 2019
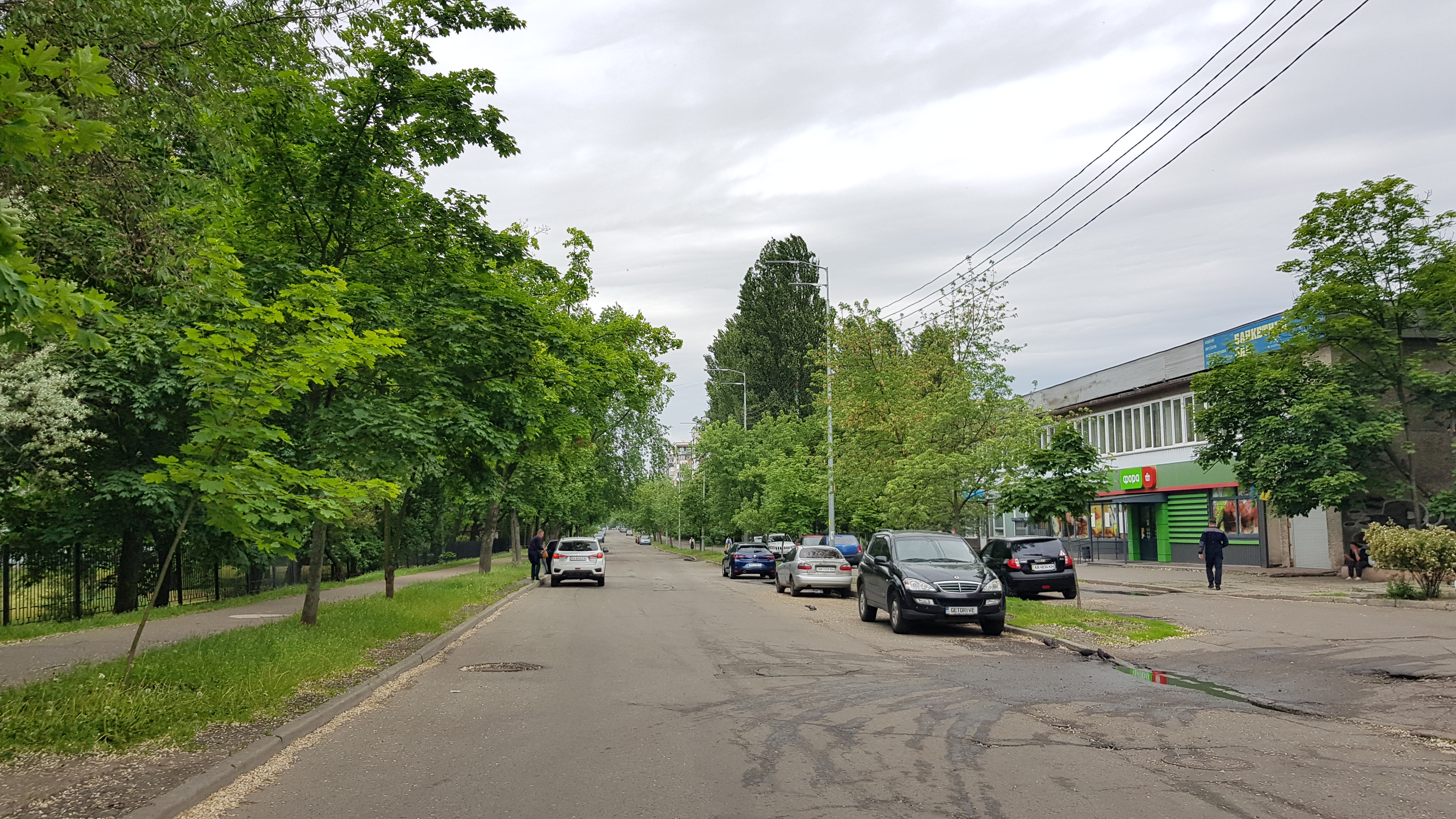
Fora store on Mykola Mateiuk Street in Kyiv in May 2022

In 2002, the owners of Silpo, having bought shares from the labor collective, acquired a chain of 38 "Dnipryanka" delis. This made it possible not only to expand the Silpo chain, but also to make room for new Fora stores — a chain that began its operations in December of the same year.

In 2005, Fora had 34 stores.

In 2006, chain of stores near the home Fora had 70 stores across Ukraine.

In the autumn of 2007, the Fozzy Group entered into an agreement with the company "BM-Trade" which received in 2006 of about $48 million revenue, which was 60% owned of the largest distributors of food products in the Baltic states — Sanitex, the rest — to individuals, citizens of Lithuania. Under the terms of the agreement, Bumi-market stores, which existed at that time 40 retail outlets in the "store at home" format with a total sales area of 15,600 m^{2} in the Kyiv, Chernihiv, Sumy, and Zhytomyr regions, will become part of the Fora retail chain, and until at the end of 2008, they will operate as part of the chain under its sign. The deal was closed on October 18. The amount of the deal was not disclosed, but in the message published the day before, Ukrsibbank stated that the bank acted as a co-underwriter of the placement Fora bonds sold for ₴200 million, which will be directed to "the purchase of a similar retail chain". Experts believe that Fozzy Group overpaid for the purchase of the chain. Dragon Capital analyst Tamara Levchenko estimated Bumi-market at $30–35 million.

In March 2008, Fozzy Group announced that it plans to open 15 stores Fora by the end of the year, and due to the crisis, from the statement published in September of the same year, it became known that only 8 stores Fora are planned to be opened by the end of the current year. However, during the year, the chain still updated several stores according to the new concept. During 2008, were opened 16 stores Fora.

From July 25, 2011, to July 24, 2012, Fora issued 120 thousand registered, interest-bearing, guaranteed bonds with a nominal value of ₴1,000 for ₴120 million at 14% for 3 years for additional financing of programs and development Fora chain store.

In 2012, Fora had 66 stores.

In 2014, Fozzy Group opened 25 new stores Fora.

In the first half of 2015, Fozzy Group opened 15 new stores Fora.

In 2016, Fozzy Group sold 8 stores of the Fora chain with a total sales area of about 2,500 m^{2} to the local retailer Digma, which at the time of purchase had 21 stores with a total sales area of more than 7,000 m^{2}, as the management of Fora made a strategic decision to develop and claim central regions of Ukraine.

On May 11, 2017, the first premium delicacy store Fora under the Favore sign was opened in Kozyn. On September 30, Fora opened the largest supermarket of the chain in Hlevakha, the area of which reaches 740 m^{2}. For the whole year, the chain was replenished with 15 stores and at the end of the year it had 245 stores.

In 2018, chain of stores Fora was replenished with 12 new stores.

At the beginning of April 2019, a new self-service service for members of the "Fora club" loyalty program — "Pocket cash register", was launched in test mode at the Fora store on Metrologichnaya Street in Kyiv, which made it possible to avoid queues at cash registers by self-scanning and paying for goods via mobile smartphone application yoCard. It was also announced that the service will be launched across the chain in the near future. In August of the same year, two years after the opening of the chain's largest supermarket in the Kyiv region, it was announced the opening of a new store in Vyshneve, the total area of which reaches 1,500 m^{2}, which is twice the size of the store that opened in 2017. Later that month, it became known that Fora had released an original mobile application, which, among other things, allows contactless payment for purchases using a QR code, which the cashier must scan from the visitor's smartphone display. This was achieved thanks to the integration of the Masterpass digital wallet platform into the mobile application, which allows you to pre-save payment cards and conduct transactions if there is a sufficient Internet limit on the card, even without an Internet connection. In 2019, the chain was replenished with 17 new stores, by the end of the year it had 248 stores. The income of the chain in 2019 amounted to ₴14.3 billion.

In 2020, chain of stores Fora launched its own online store located at shop.fora.ua. In April of the same year, the chain launched a product delivery service in cooperation with prom — regular customers and guests of "Fora" were able to order delivery of goods from the store on the web portal fora.prom.ua in Kyiv, Boryspil, Brovary, Irpin, Vyshneve, Sofiivska Borshchahivka and Petropavlivska Borshchahivka. Subsequently, it was planned to expand delivery to all regions where the chain operates. The service cost ₴69, orders were processed from 9 a.m. to 8 p.m. Later that month, the opportunity to order delivery of more than 500 types of goods from the assortment chain of stores Fora also appeared on the Bigl online marketplace owned the EVO. The company promised to collect the goods ordered from Fora and deliver them to your home within three hours.

In July 2021, chain of stores Fora launched its own ForaPay self-service service, which allows you to add goods to the electronic cart in the mobile application Fora by scanning barcodes with a smartphone camera and pay for them at self-service checkouts, bypassing cashiers. According to the results of the year, 14 new stores Fora were opened in 9 settlements of Ukraine.

By the beginning of 2022, chain of stores Fora had 280 stores across Ukraine. As a result of the Russian invasion of Ukraine, more than 25 stores were partially or completely destroyed, the work of some of them is gradually being restored. By the end of April, 212 stores were already working. On July 8, Fora opened two new stores in Kyiv. As of the beginning of August, 2 more stores were opened in Kyiv.

== Evaluation ==
In November 2017, the experts of NV together with MPP Consulting valued Fora at $57.5 million.

== Services ==
Fora club — a loyalty program that allows you to receive rewards for purchases, such as bonuses and special offers, which operates in the supermarket chain Fora. According to the results of 2021, it counted 4,841,564 participants.

ForaPay — a self-service service in supermarkets of the chain, which allows you to add goods to the electronic cart in the mobile application Fora by scanning barcodes with a smartphone camera, and pay at the self-service checkout, bypassing the cashiers.

== Gallery ==
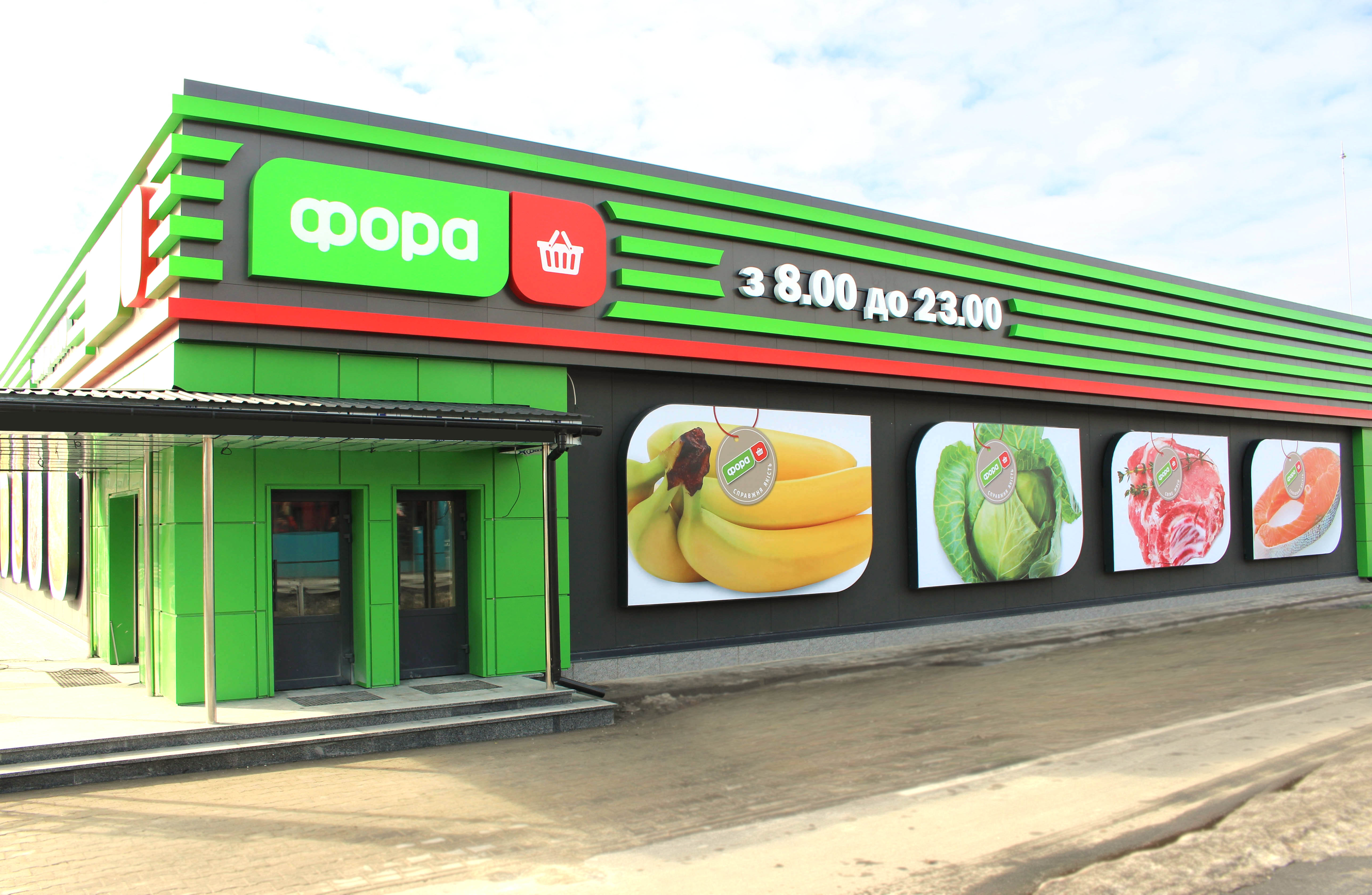
A new type of supermarket Fora

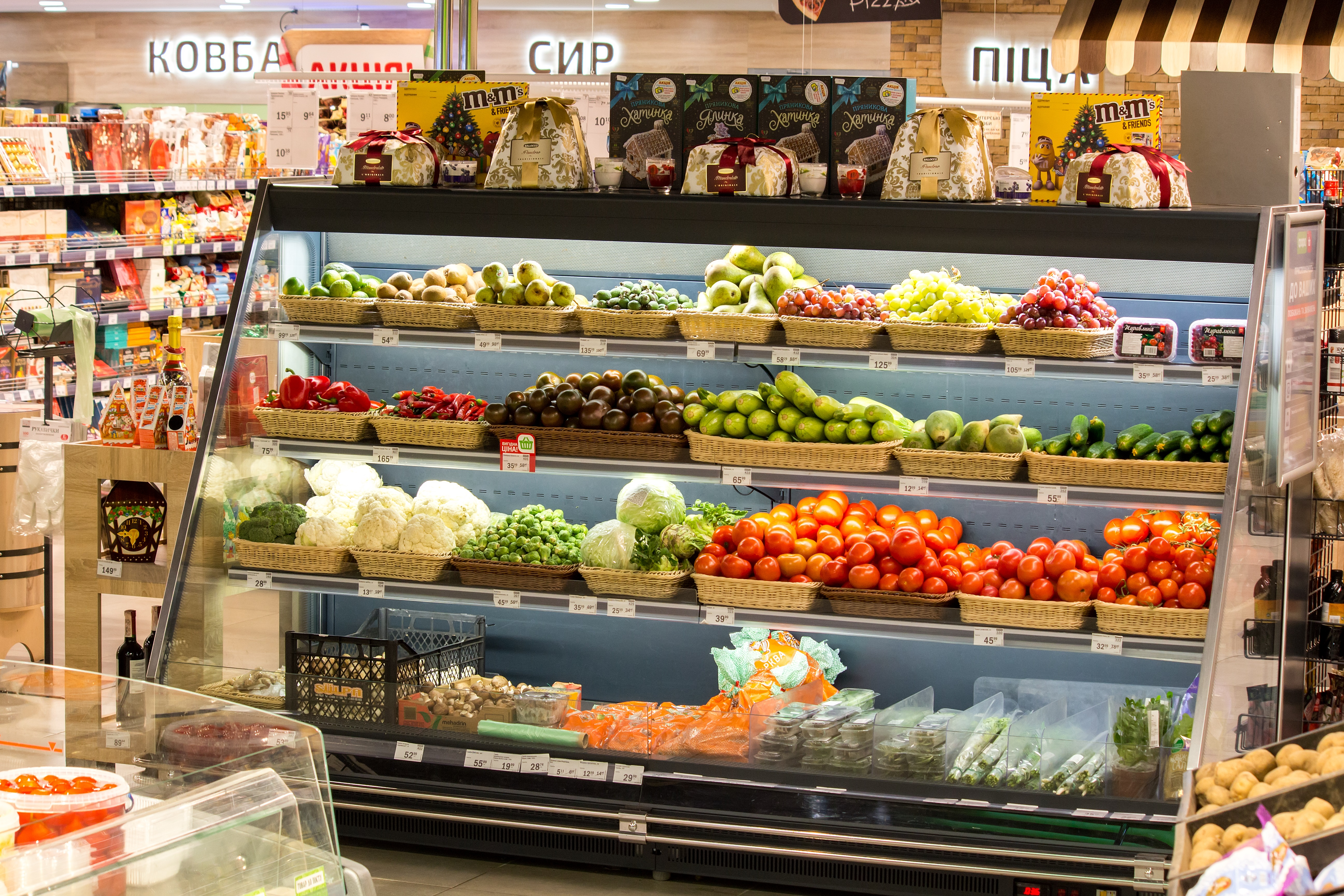
Refrigerator for vegetables and fruits

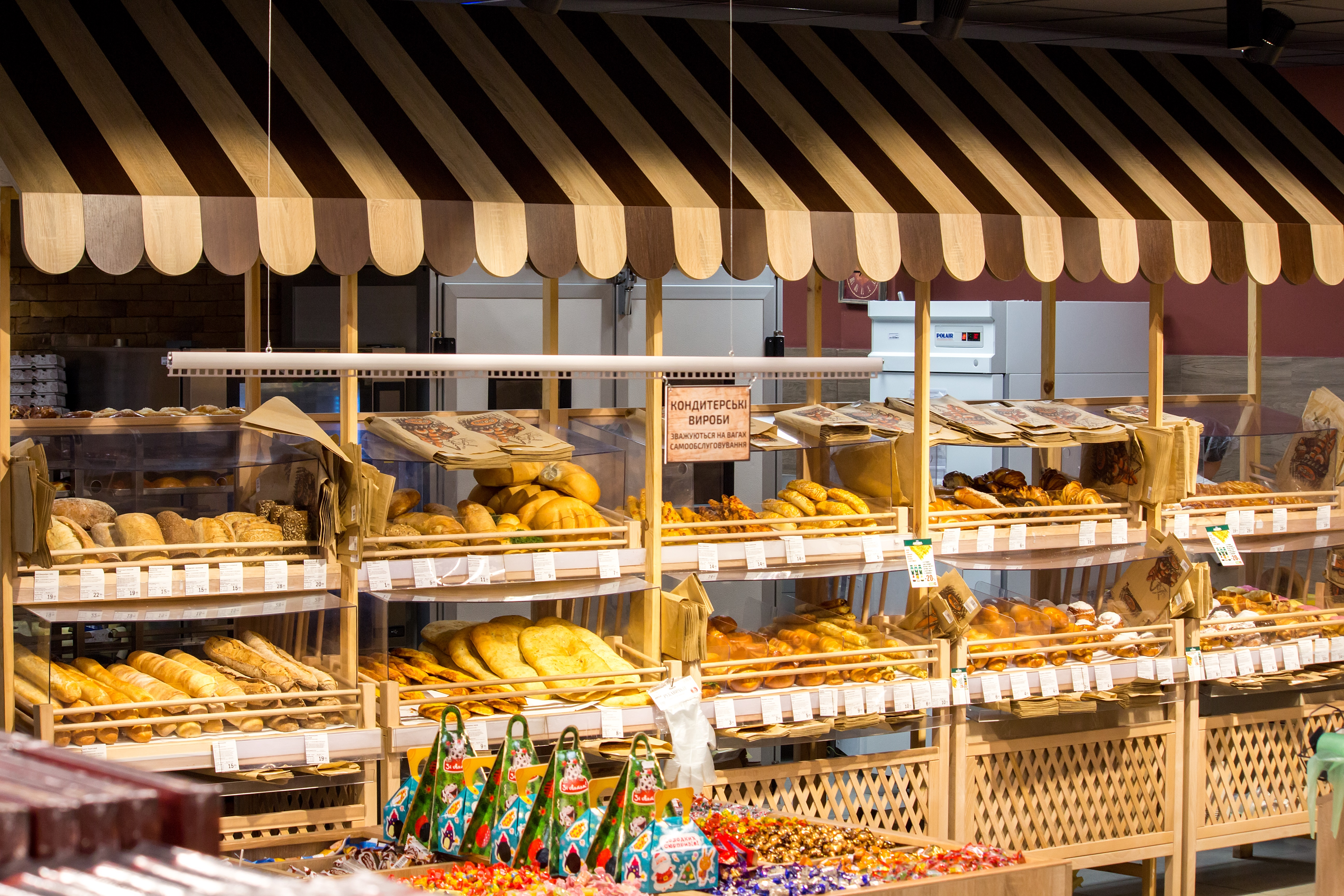
Own full-cycle bakery in Fora

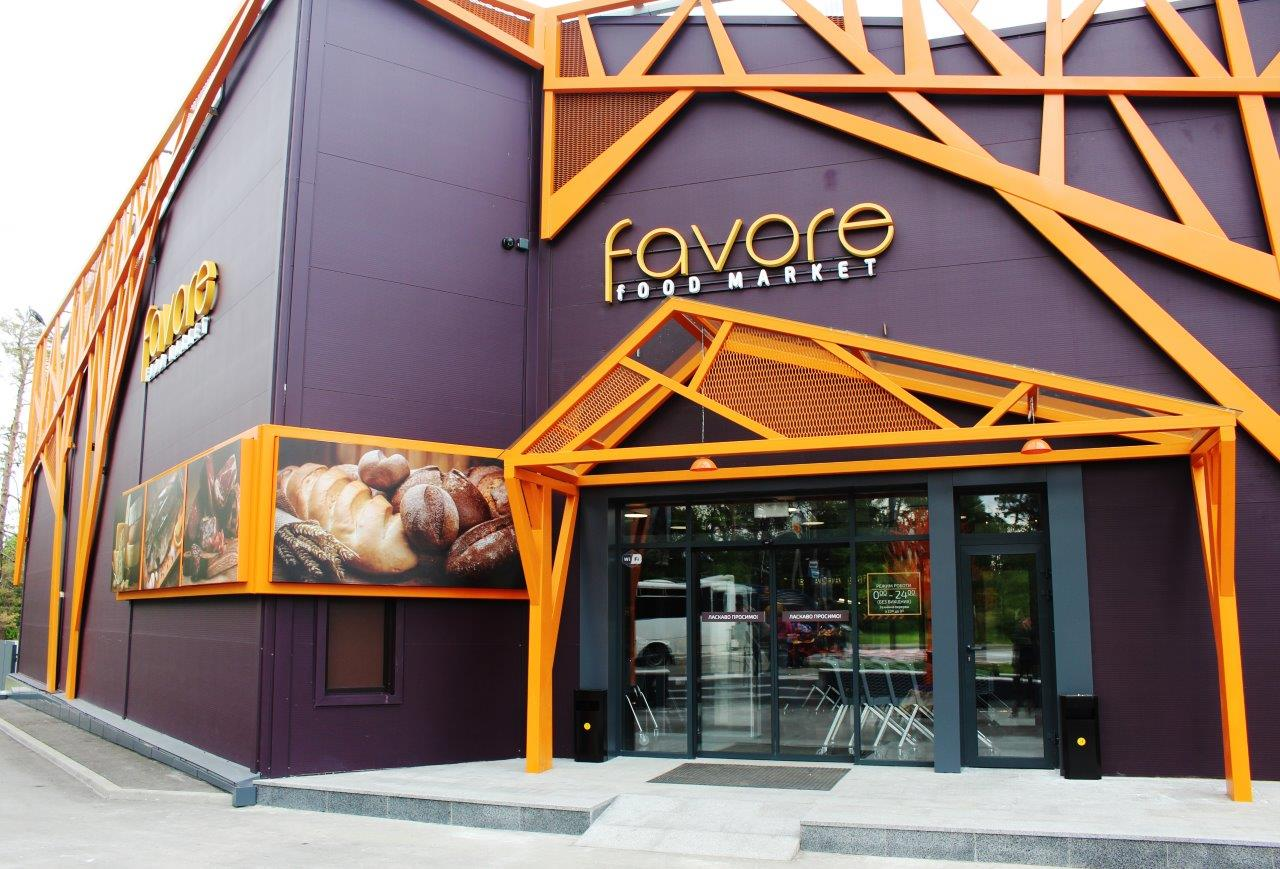
Exterior decoration of the facade of premium supermarket Favore

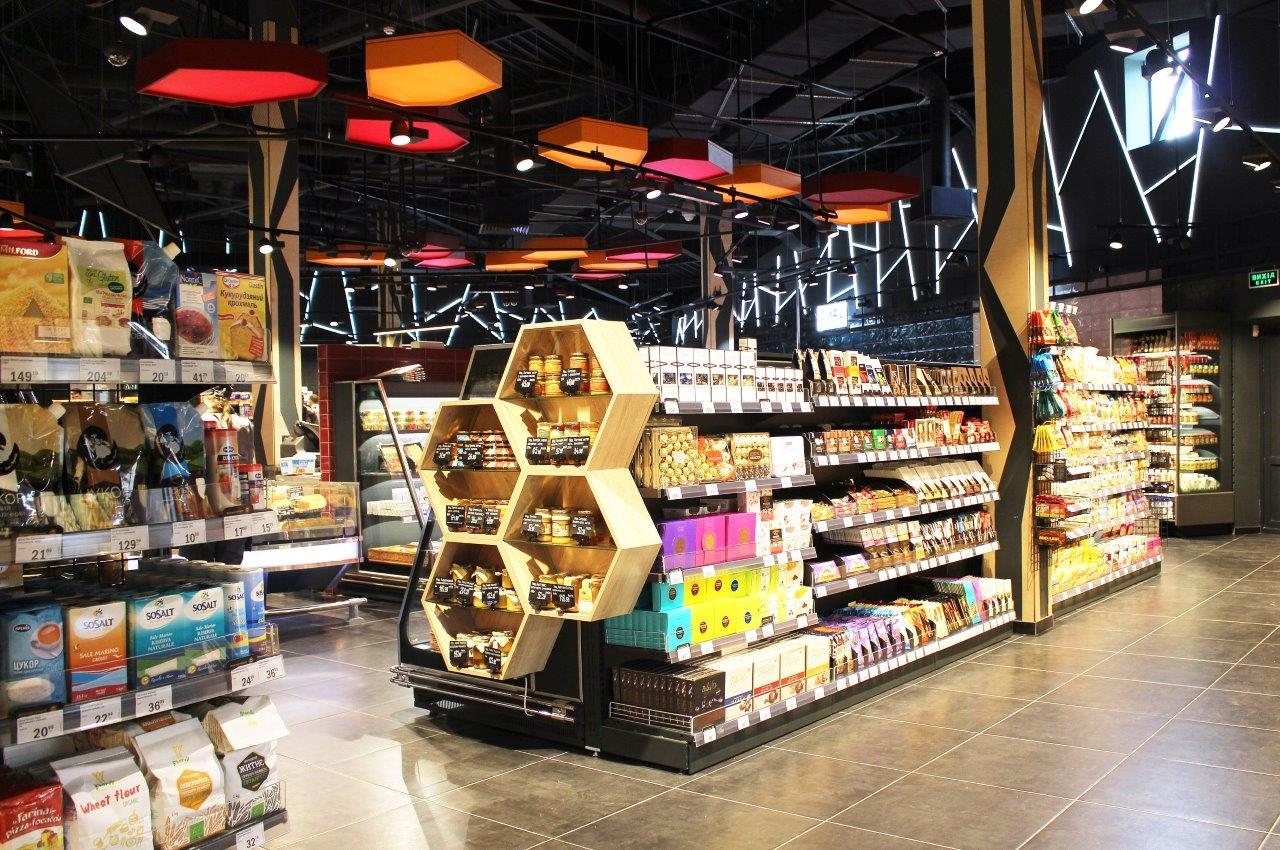
Trading hall of premium supermarket Favore

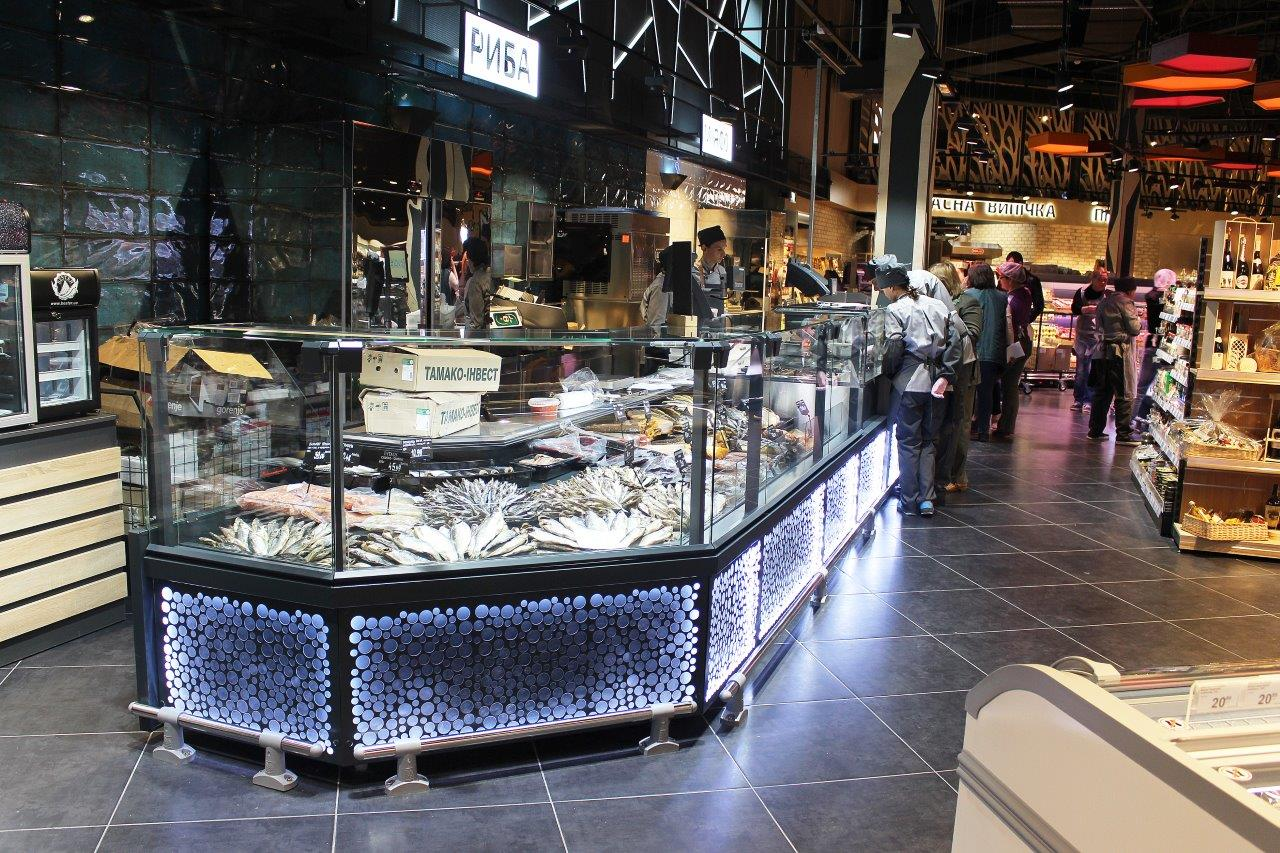
Seafood hall of premium supermarket Favore

== See also ==
- Fozzy Group
- List of supermarket chains in Ukraine
