= Zhytniy Market =

Market in Kyiv

- Житній ринок
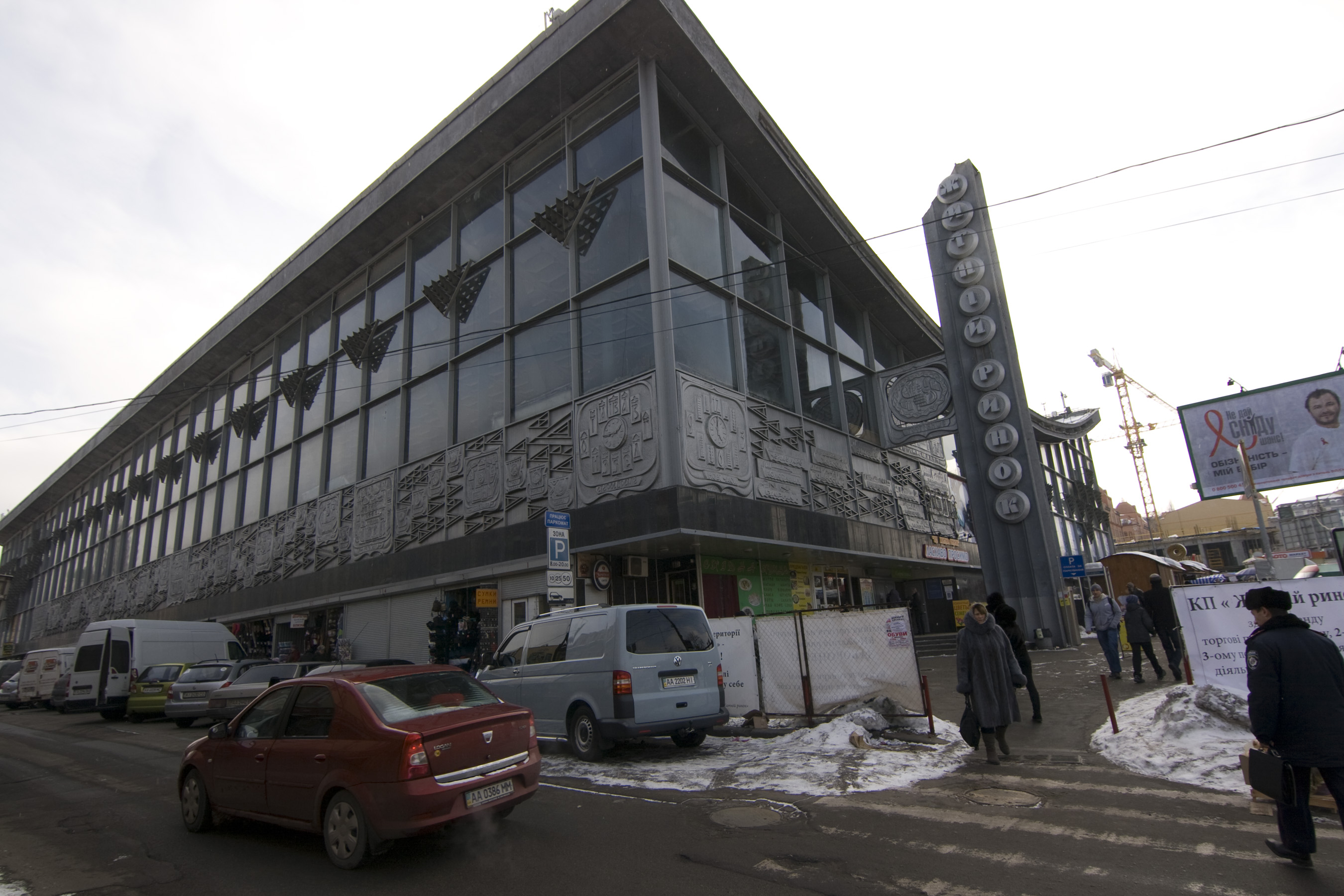
- Zhytniy Market in 2013
- Interactive map of the Zhytniy Market area

General information
- Type: Indoor market
- Location: 16 Verkhnii Val St., Kyiv, Ukraine
- Coordinates: 50.4650°N 30.5115°E
- Construction started: 1974
- Completed: 1980

Technical details
- Floor count: 2

Design and construction
- Architects: Valentyn Shtolko, Olha Monina
- Engineer: O. Bednarskyi
- Other designers: Anatoliy Domnych

Website
- www.zhytniy-rynok.kiev.ua (in Ukrainian)

Zhytniy Market (Ukrainian: Житній ринок, romanized: Zhytniy rynok) or Rye Market is an indoor market in the Podil neighbourhood of Kyiv, Ukraine. The modernist building, then the largest indoor market in Europe, opened in 1980 on the site of an open-air market dating to the time of the Kievan Rus'.

== History ==
=== Outdoor market ===
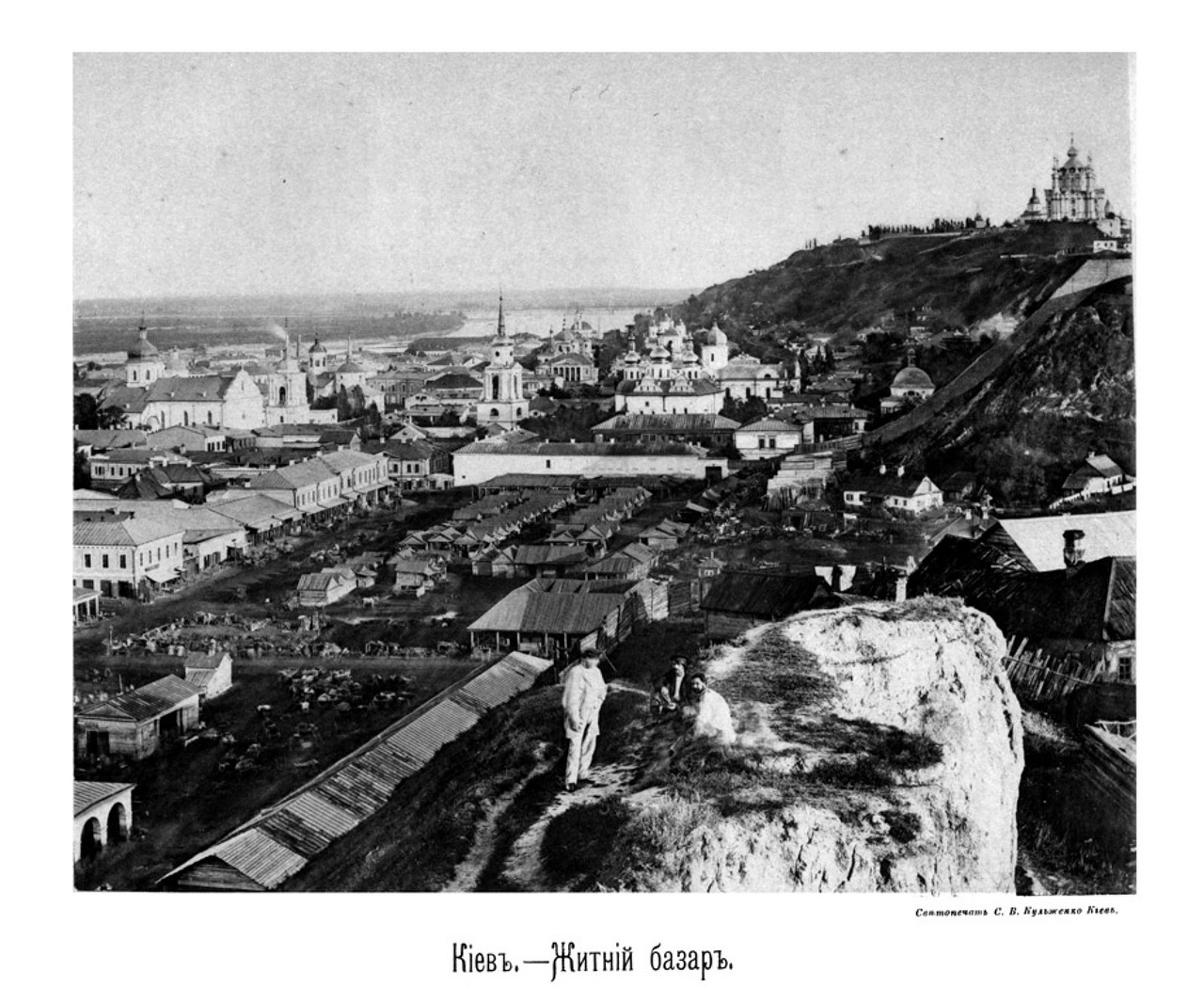
Outdoor market in 1888 (left foreground)

There has been a market on the site since the time of the Kievan Rus', and it has been a major marketplace since the 15th century.

In 1811 a fire started on a street near the market. The poor state of the roads prevented firefighters from reaching the location in time, so the fire spread to the market and the wooden buildings around it. The fire lasted for three days and became known as the Great Podil fire.

During the Ukrainian War of Independence, on 10 April 1919, two months after the capture of Kyiv by Bolsheviks, Zhytniy Market was captured by Ukrainian insurgents and became one of the centers of the Kurenivka uprising; later that day the entire city centre had been liberated. In the evening Bolshevik reinforcements arrived and the main battle took place in front of the market. Due to lack of weapons, the insurgents had to retreat and the following day the uprising was suppressed.

=== Indoor market ===
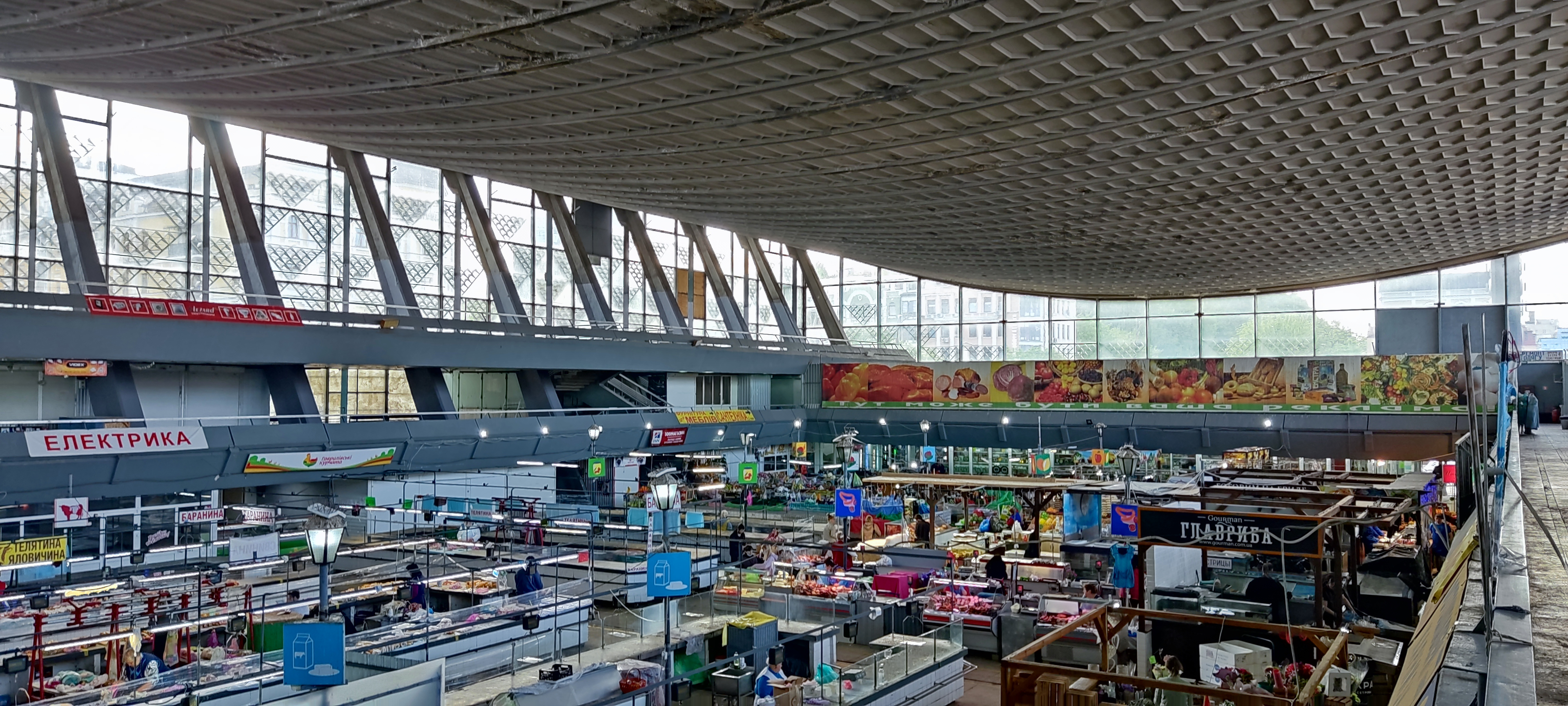
Market interior, 2021

The current modernist building was designed by Valentyn Shtolko and Olha Monina, and built in 1974–1980. Designed to accommodate 1,350 vendors, it was then the largest indoor market in Europe. A curving concrete ceiling patterned with hexagonal indentations spans the market hall, supported by jutting beams. Clerestory windows on all sides are overlaid with metal designs evoking the horse chestnut leaf that symbolises Kyiv. Metal reliefs on the exterior by Anatoliy Domnych depict Ukrainian trade routes over 1,500 years.

The projected development also included a 112-suite hotel; however, with Podil gaining the status of an architectural preserve, the plans were scrapped. Two rain shelters were installed on the site of the cancelled hotel; in the 1990s these were demolished and replaced with a car park.

On 29 January 2009 Kyiv City Council agreed to privatise the Zhytniy and Volodymyrskyi markets; the next day someone set fire to Zhytniy Market, which was a common scheme to legally demolish historic buildings in order to make way for new construction. Rather than market security, one of the market sellers saw the fire and called the fire department. The fire damaged a fish vendor's stall and filled the building with smoke so that it had to be ventilated for an entire day. On 2 February 2010 the workers of Zhytniy Market gathered to protest its privatisation.

Over the years the building has become increasingly in need of renovation, and it is threatened by the war that began with Russia's invasion in February 2022 and also by anti-Russian sentiment that has led to the destruction of many monuments from the Soviet era. Once packed with vendors and the site of monthly flea markets, it is now little used. In 2024, the city council twice offered its lease at auction and then withdrew it. Celebrity chef Yevhen Klopotenko is among those urging the building be saved and refurbished as a tourist attraction.
