= Fozzy Group =

Ukrainian retail companies

Fozzy Group, LLC
- Trade name: Fozzy Group
- Native name: Фоззі Груп
- Romanized name: Fozzi Hrup
- Type: Privately held company
- Industry: Retail supermarkets, stores and restaurants. Food production and canning
- Founded: 1997
- Headquarters: Kyiv, Ukraine
- Key people: Ms. Nadiya Bondareva, CEO; Volodymyr Kostelman, President
- Products: Canned foods, sausage, poultry, portable toilets
- Services: Food retailing, food processing, food export, catering
- Owner: Volodymyr Kostelman (51%); Roman Chyhir (23,2%); Oleh Sotnikov (23,2%); Yurii Hnatenko (2,5%)
- Number of employees: 55,000
- Divisions: Fozzy Agro; Fozzy Logistic
- Subsidiaries: Fozzy Commerce; Fozzy Farm; Fozzy Group Health; Fozzy Media Group
- Website: fozzy.ua/en

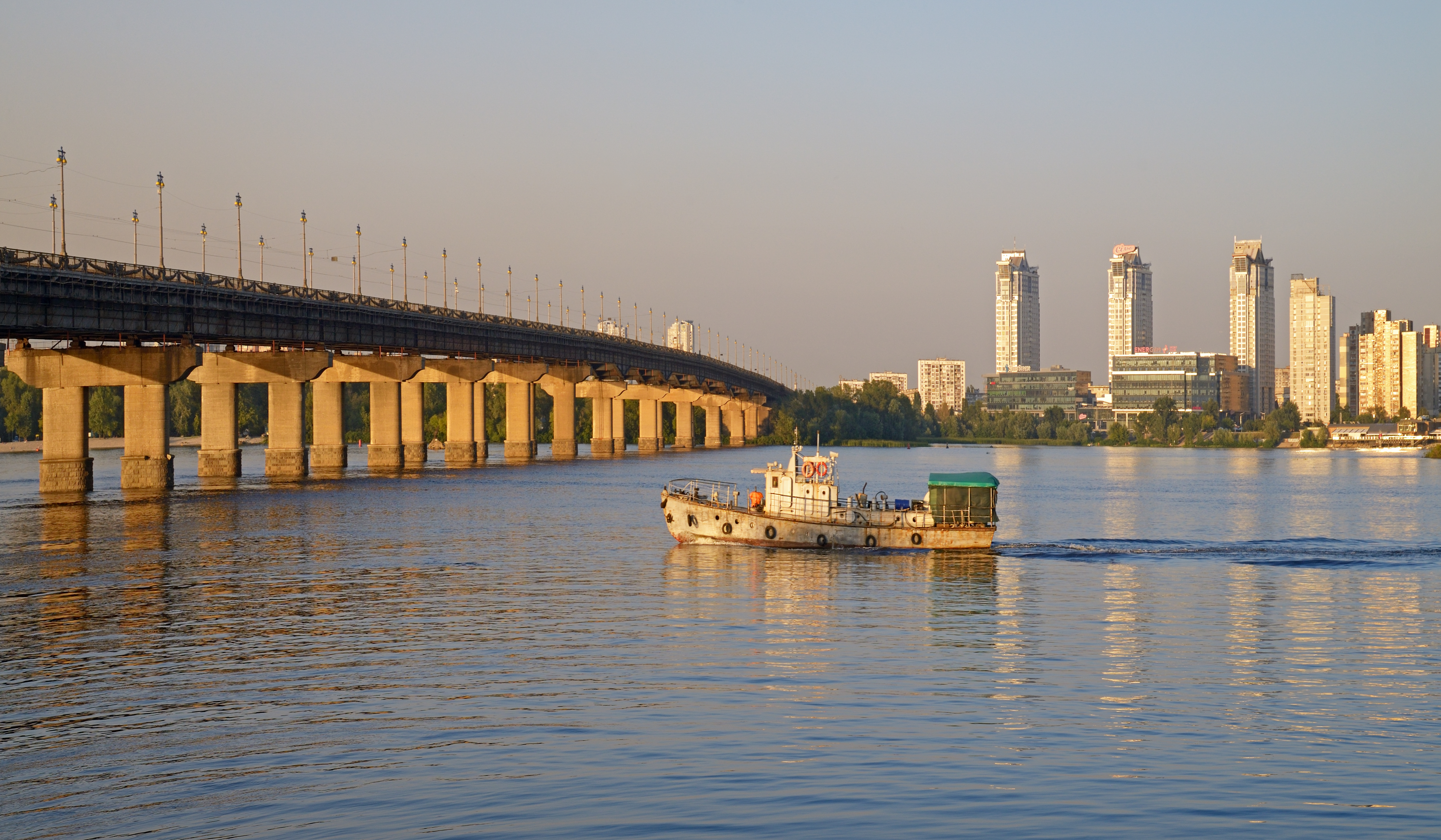
Fozzy Group headquarters on the left bank of Kyiv in the Silver Breeze multifunctional complex on Pavla Tychyna Avenue

Fozzy Group, LLC is the fifth largest private and the second largest retail company in Ukraine, operating over 830 stores across the country. Headquartered in Kyiv, the company was founded in 1997 by Volodymyr Kostelman and is controlled by him with a 51% stake and, in addition to retail, has business interests in agriculture, food manufacturing, banking, IT, internet media, e-commerce, healthcare, logistics and restaurants.

The company has operates in Ukraine the flagship chain of Silpo supermarkets and Le Silpo premium format delicatessen stores, Silpo Voyage travel agency, Fora minimarkets, Fora Express convenience stores, Fora To Go corner stores and Favore deli store, Thrash! grocery stores, Fozzy Cash & Carry wholesale hypermarkets, Sniatynska ptytsia fresh meat shops, Bila Romashka pharmaceutical shops and Bud Zdorovyi drugstores, E-ZOO pet stores, FEELtrd coffee shops, commercial bank VST and neobank BVR, dry cleaning Mink, sports clubs Apollo Next and medical centers Doctor Sam, online marketplaces Maudau and Pampik, internet media BZH and Village, courier service LOKO, food factories and restaurants U Khromogo Pola, Staromak, U Golema, La Bodeguita del Medio, Divan.

== Private labels ==
As of 2025, Fozzy Group owns 28 own brands and about 3,000 items. The flagship private label of Fozzy Group — Premiya is sold in most of the retail chains of the group of companies, and its widest range is presented in the Silpo chain, which was first introduced in December 2006. It includes the widest assortment, which increased from 87 product lines in 2006 to 520 product names in 72 categories in 2008, which includes cream cheese, sandwiches and greens in cans, and certified organic sturgeon roe is distributed under its own label Premiya Select. The group of companies also owns smaller labels Povna Chasha, Povna Charka, Protex.

== Wine importing ==
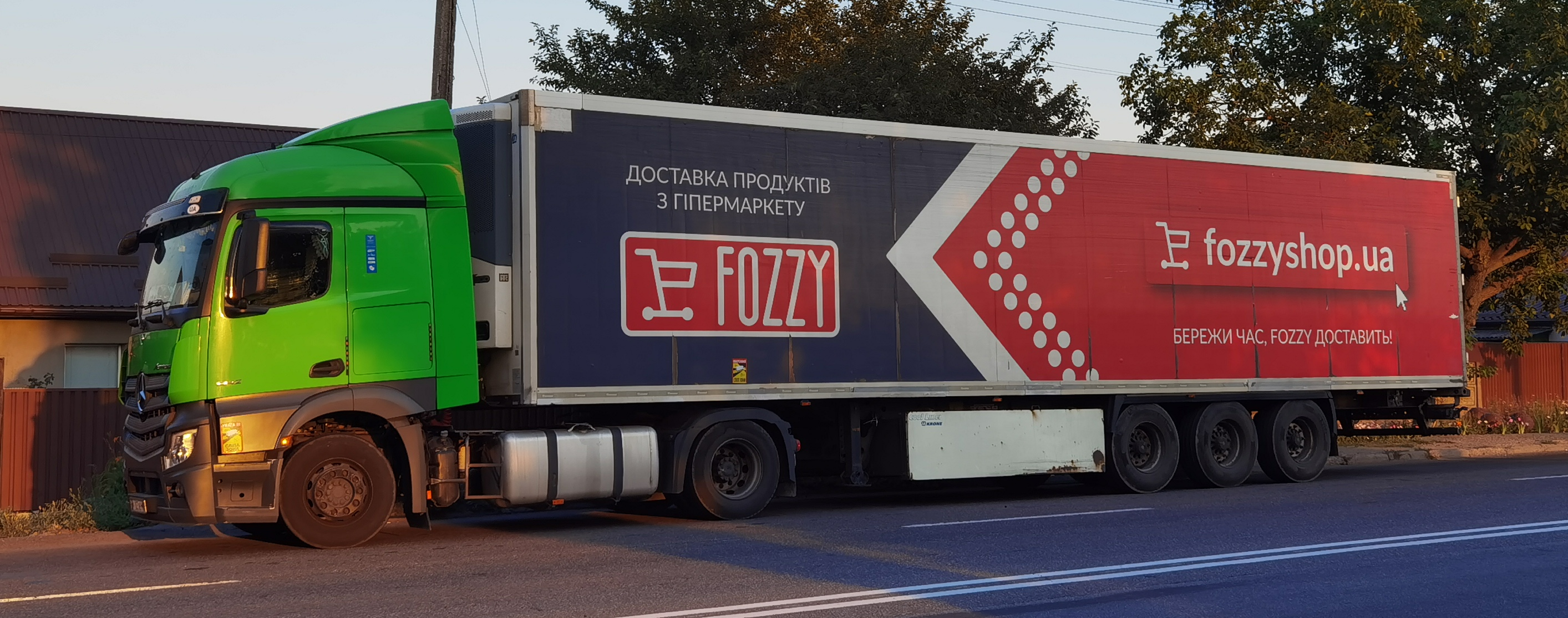
Fozzy truck in Dnipro.

Fozzy Group also imports wines into Ukraine from 34 wine producers (as of May 2011), including brands from Italy, Germany, Hungary, France, Italy, Chile, Argentina, New Zealand, and South Africa.

== Assets ==
=== Retail ===
- Silpo-Food, LLC — founded in early August 2016 with headquarters in Kyiv, a company in Ukraine that took over management of the Silpo and Le Silpo supermarket chain after Fozzy-Food, LLC, and later launched the online store silpo.ua. (Note: OVO.market as a startup legally named as Kyiv Ovochi, LLC, which began operations in the format of warehouse outsourcing, and had 10 couriers and about 50 employees as of June 2021, and about 10,000 of users in Kyiv and the region at the beginning of 2022, which was privately acquired by Silpo-Food in October 2023.)
    - OFFTOP — a chain of non-food boutiques was launched in 2020, the assortment of which, after the closure of the boutiques in early 2022, is located exclusively in the spaces of some Silpo stores.
    - FEELtrd — a chain of coffee shops was launched in 2020, which are mostly located next to the sales halls of the Silpo chain.
- Fora, LLC — is a Ukrainian company founded in 2002 with headquarters in Kyiv, which manages the supermarket chain of the same name and the Favore delicatessen.
- Ekspansiia, LLC — is a Ukrainian company founded in 2002 with headquarters in Vyshneve, which manages the chain of wholesale hypermarkets Fozzy Cash & Carry.
- Thrash, LLC — is a Ukrainian company founded in 2016 with headquarters in Kyiv, which manages a chain of grocery stores of the same name, stylized as Thrash!
- Fasol, LLC — is a Ukrainian company founded in 2016 with headquarters in Kyiv, was manages a chain of food minimarkets FOODpod, which previously operated as FOODY.

=== Logistic ===
- Ukrainski vantazhni kuriery, LLC — is a Ukrainian company founded in 2007 with headquarters in Vyshneve, which manages the logistics company UVK, founded in 2001 and acquired by Fozzy Group in 2006, one of the 10 largest logistics companies in Ukraine.
- Post-Interneishnl, LLC — is a Ukrainian company with headquarters in Kyiv, acquired by Fozzy Group in 2017, a private postal operator founded in 1999.
- Inpost Ekspres, LLC — is a Ukrainian company with headquarters in Kyiv, acquired by Fozzy Group in 2017, a private express operator founded in 2006.

==== Other ====
The group of companies has its own logistics, which includes 4 centers in Ukraine: in Kyiv, Zaporizhzhia, Odesa and Kharkiv. The needs of the group are served by 562 trucks. The main fleet is located in the village. Trebukhiv, Brovary district, Kyiv region, where the main office and service station (2,500 m2) are also located.

In February 2018, the group of companies renewed its fleet by purchasing 40 Mercedes-Benz Actros trucks worth € 5.2 million. In July 2018, the company bought the Post.ua courier service, founded by Vitaliy Yanitsky. Based on it, Fozzy Group began to develop its own delivery operator B2C Justin, which stopped working in the spring of 2022.

=== Developing ===
- Fozzy Commerce, LLC — a company founded in 2019 with headquarters in Kyiv, engaged in wholesale purchases for Fozzy Group.
- PJSC Silpo Retail — is a structural unit of Fozzy Group, was registered in 2005 in Ukraine with its headquarters in Kyiv, which is engaged in leasing own or leased real estate, building buildings and buying and selling real estate.
- JSC Ekspansia Retail
- JSC Fora Retail
- JSC Fozzy Retail

=== Service industries ===
- Silpo Voiazh, LLC — is a Ukrainian company founded in 2014 with headquarters in Kyiv, which manages a chain of travel agencies of the same name.
- Foodtech Haraka, LLC — is a Ukrainian company founded in 2021 with headquarters in Kyiv, which manages the Silpo-supported courier service ¡LOKO!, which was launched in June 2022.
- Weekly'n, LLC — is a Ukrainian company founded in 2021 with headquarters in Kyiv, which manages an online dry cleaning service Mink.
- E-Zoo: We love pets, LLC — is a Ukrainian company founded in 2021 with headquarters in Kyiv, which manages a pet stores of the same name, stylized as e•zoo.
- Garage Mobile Group, LLC — is a Ukrainian company founded in 2007 with headquarters in Vyshneve, the main activity of which was the management of the ringoo chain of personal electronics stores, which, as of its closure in March 2024, had 76 retail outlets in large cities and regional centers.
- Maudau, LLC — is a Ukrainian company founded in 2020 with headquarters in Kyiv, which operates an online marketplace of the same name.

=== Information technology ===
- Fozzy Media Group, LLC — is a Ukrainian company founded in 2016 with headquarters in Kyiv, which manages a web portal of culinary recipes shuba.life, news media bzh.life and VILLAGE.
- Temabit, LLC — is a Ukrainian business software development company founded in 2018 with headquarters in Kyiv.

=== Healthcare ===
- Apollo-18, LLC — is a Ukrainian company founded in 2021 with headquarters in Kyiv, which manages a chain of sports clubs APOLLO NEXT.
- Fozzy-Farm, LLC — founded in 2001, a Ukrainian company specializing in the retail trade of pharmaceutical products in its own pharmacy stores Bila Romashka and drug store Bud Zdorovyi.
- Fozzy Group Health, LLC — is a Ukrainian company founded in 2021 with headquarters in Kyiv, specializing in medical care and development of a chain of branded clinics and medical centers Doctor Sam, which is co-owned by Sam Aganov with a 5% stake.

=== Finance ===
- JSC VST Bank is a Ukrainian commercial bank acquired by Fozzy Group from Platinum Bank in 2012 with the main office in Kyiv, formerly as PJSC Bank Vostok which is the legal successor of PJSC Home Credit Bank, which in turn was organized on the basis of CJSC Agrobank, founded in 2002 year. The bank is controlled through Vostok Capital, LLC, which is a 50-50 joint venture between JSC Vermont and Fozzy Group, LLC through its subsidiary JSC Fozzy Group.
    - Bank Vlasnyi Rakhunok (BVR) is a Ukrainian neobank, founded in 2021, a new product (Note: In 2017, in cooperation with Mastercard, a program was launched to issue prepaid cards at Silpo supermarket checkouts, which were served until December 31, 2020 due to a change in legislation.) of cooperation between the Silpo chain, which has its own loyalty program Vlasnyi Rakhunok and Vostok Bank, which makes payments at Fozzy Group points of sale and under whose license the neobank operates, serving over 350,000 clients.

=== Agricultural industry ===
- Nizhynskyi konservnyi zavod, LLC — is a Ukrainian company founded in 2007 with headquarters in Kyiv, which produces and exports 40% of products under the Nizhin and Greenville brands at the plant of the same name, which is one of the five largest producers of canned vegetables in Ukraine, founded in 1927 in Nizhyn, and acquired by Fozzy Group in 2000.
- Vyrobnycho-komertsiina firma Varto, LLC — is a Ukrainian company founded in 2008 with headquarters in Vyshneve, which manages a poultry farm in Sniatyn, founded in November 1985, acquired by Fozzy Group in 2006.
- Sniatynska ptakhofabryka, LLC — is a Ukrainian company founded in 2011 with headquarters in Vyshneve, engaged in poultry breeding.
- Sumyrybhosp PJSC — is a Ukrainian company founded in 1998 that manages a fish and fish breeding enterprise, acquired by Fozzy Group in 2015.
- Bohuslavskyi zavod prodtovariv, LLC — purchased by Fozzy Group at the beginning of 2017, a Ukrainian company that manages a confectionery factory founded in 1982 in the city of Bohuslav under the trade mark Bohuslavna, in particular marshmallows made from applesauce of its own production, butter and oat biscuits, etc., in total, about 30 items.
- MCIBBC Group, LLC — is a Ukrainian company founded in 2016 with headquarters in Bohuslav, that manages a Zhytomyr Hosiery Factory founded in 2015 under the trade mark Left&Right.
- Vohni Hestii, LLC — purchased by Fozzy Group at the beginning of 2017, a Ukrainian company founded in 2006 with headquarters in Vyshneve, which manages a fish processing plant and produces products under its own trademarks SKADI, Vohni moria and the Premiya trademark.

==== Other ====
Fozzy Group exports its canned food products internationally, including to North America, Eastern Europe and Asia. Additional industrial lines owned and operated by the company are a meat-processing plant named Ruta LLC that produces manufactured meat and sausages, and a company named Eco-service Ukraine LLC involved in the commerce and servicing of portable toilets. In addition, Fozzy Group acquired the Friedrich Engels Confectionery Factory and the Malinsky meat processing plant in 2003, the Vozzelsky bread processing plant in 2014, the vegetable breeding company Agro-Alliance Zakarpattia in 2015, the agricultural company "Belarus" in 2018, and the agricultural firm "Orshevska" in 2020.

== Legal issues ==
In February 2003, the Ukrainian Prosecutor General's Office announced that several cases involving tax evasion, counterfeit vodka and illegal equipment sales had been opened against Fozzy Group. Additionally, accusations were made by the Prosecutor General's Office that Fozzy Group engaged in illegal money laundering. At the time, Volodymyr Kostelman, President of the company, stated that the Prosecutor General's Office findings regarding tax evasion were based upon incorrect figures, and that Fozzy Group had not engaged in any illegal activities. It was also reported at the time that Kostelman "hinted that his company was framed by tax officials and that Ukrainian businesses are currently not safe from corruption."

In May 2016, the Solomyansky District Court of Kyiv seized the accounts of Fozzy-Food, LLC due to understatement of value added tax by officials. The investigation established that officials of Fozzy-Food, LLC, while conducting financial and economic relations with a number of companies by conducting non-goods transactions, understated VAT in January-February 2015 by the amount of 32.2 million hryvnias. The offense was recorded in the act of an unscheduled on-site inspection of the Fiscal Service in November 2015. During the inspection, inconsistency of the purchased and sold goods, non-confirmation of the reality of financial and economic transactions, and the absence of the possibility of fulfilling contractual relations were revealed. It was established that Fozzy-Food, LLC has accounts in Joint Bank Pivdenny PJSC and Bank Vostok PJSC, on which, in order to stop criminal activity and to further compensate the losses caused to the state, a seizure was imposed on them and it was forbidden to dispose of funds and it was ruled to stop spending transactions with the funds coming into the accounts.

On July 12, 2016, the Pechersk District Court of Kyiv decided to seize the accounts of Fozzy-Food, LLC to ensure the fulfillment of its obligations to VTB-Bank PJSC (Note: Ukrainian subsidiary bank of the Russian majority state-owned bank of the same name.) under the 2007 credit agreement, under which the total amount owed by the retailer to the bank is ₴302.48 million. With this decision, the court partially satisfied the bank's claim and ordered the seizure of funds on any Fozzy-Food accounts in the amount of ₴239.13 million. In addition, the Kyiv Commercial Court of Appeal, by its decision dated July 19, 2016, also partially satisfied the claim of VTB Bank, imposing a seizure on Fozzy-Food funds in Bank Vostok PJSC accounts in the amount of ₴64.8 million.

On August 2, 2016, the Court of Appeal of Kyiv overturned the decision of the Pechersk District Court of Kyiv to impose seizures on the accounts of Fozzy-Food, LLC, a structural unit of the Fozzy Group registered in December 2002, which had been engaged in the operational activities of the Silpo supermarket chain in Ukraine since August 2003.

== See also ==
- List of supermarket chains in Ukraine
