= Silpo =

Ukrainian retail store

- Native name: Сільпо
- Type: Private
- Industry: Grocery retail
- Founded: 1998; 28 years ago
- Founder: Volodymyr Kostelman (Ultimate Beneficial Owner (UBO))
- Headquarters: Kyiv, Ukraine
- Number of locations: 305 (2025)
- Area served: Ukraine
- Products: Foodstuffs and essential nonfood commodities
- Revenue: 106,070,869,000 hryvnia (2025)
- Total assets: 34,084,893,000 hryvnia (2025)
- Parent: Fozzy Group
- Website: silpo.ua

Silpo (Ukrainian: Сільпо; legally Silpo-Fud) is a Ukrainian retail corporation that operates a chain of grocery stores. It is part of the Fozzy Group, a major Ukrainian industrial and trade group. As of early 2025, the network comprises 305 stores across 62 cities.

Since 2018, new stores have been opened in thematic designs — from Kabuki theatre to the world of the Little Prince or the video game S.T.A.L.K.E.R. — created in collaboration with Ukrainian artists and international brands. Silpo stores are regularly featured in the Europe’s Finest Store ranking by European Supermarket Magazine. The company also operates a premium-format store under the brand Le Silpo.

Silpo hosts a variety of events, including gastronomic festivals, tastings, theatrical performances, and guided tours. Another signature element of the brand is the short “predictions” printed on receipts.

Silpo develops its private labels and handles direct import operations to deliver unique products from around the world without intermediaries. It also supports small Ukrainian producers through the Shop of Traditions (Lavka Tradytsii) project.

The company also invests in online ordering and pickup services, and offers a mobile app with a built-in loyalty program called Vlasnyi Rakhunok (“Personal Account”).

== History ==
=== 1998–2005 ===
Silpo truck in Dnipro, Ukraine

The Silpo chain was founded in 1998, with the first store opened in Kyiv. By the end of that year, the chain had grown to five stores. By 2002, Silpo operated 23 supermarkets in Kyiv, Lviv, Odesa, Dnipro, and Zaporizhzhia. In 2005, the number of stores reached 81, covering most regional centers in Ukraine.

=== 2006–2011 ===
In 2006, Silpo was among the first Ukrainian retailers to launch private label brands, including Premiya, Premiya Select, Premiya Riki-Tiki, and Povna Chasha.

The same year, the loyalty program Vlasnyi Rakhunok ("Personal Account") was introduced in a pilot format and expanded nationwide in 2007.

By the end of 2008, the chain had grown to 150 stores.

In 2011, with store openings in Dnipro and Sievierodonetsk (before 2024, Severodonetsk), Silpo became a retail chain with a presence in all regions of Ukraine.

=== 2012–2015 ===
In 2012, Silpo launched a new premium delicatessen format, Le Silpo, with the first store opening in Kharkiv, followed by locations in Dnipro and Kyiv.

In 2014, Silpo introduced the concept of individually themed supermarket designs, starting with a pop-art styled store in Kyiv.

In 2015, a store inspired by Alice in Wonderland opened in Lviv, and the company began integrating food halls into its supermarkets.

=== 2016–2019 ===
In 2016, Silpo was recognized as one of the most innovative companies in Ukraine.

In 2017, three Silpo supermarkets were listed in the Europe’s Finest Store ranking by European Supermarket Magazine. The first True&Local festival of regional gastronomy also took place that year.

In 2018, Silpo introduced self-checkouts in two Kyiv locations and launched a mobile app with loyalty program and online payments via Masterpass and QR code. That year also saw the opening of Ukraine’s first recycling station inside a supermarket — #SilpoRecycling in Kyiv.

In 2019, Silpo together with Ukrainian animation studio Animagrad (FILM.UA Group) opened a designer store inspired by the animated film Mavka.

=== 2020–2021 ===
In 2020, Silpo opened Silpo ReCycling, the first Ukrainian supermarket certified under the international BREEAM eco-standard, producing energy from renewable sources.

The chain also launched its radio station, in-store FEELtrd coffee bars, and the neobank Bank Vlasnyi Rakhunok (with Bank Vostok). Online ordering services became available the same year.

During the COVID-19 pandemic, Silpo launched the #HeroesOfToday campaign, highlighting frontline workers. The company donated ₴100 million to support hospitals and provide personal protective equipment (PPE) for medical staff.

In 2021, Silpo opened 35 designer supermarkets.

In November 2021, the Merman art installation — a Burning Man grant winner — was installed in a Silpo store in Respublika Park mall.

=== 2022–2023 ===
The start of the full-scale invasion

Following Russia’s full-scale invasion in early 2022, Silpo temporarily closed 38 stores in Kyiv, Kharkiv, Sumy, and Chernihiv regions. Most of them were reopened by August. Additionally, 31 supermarkets were lost in active combat zones and temporarily occupied territories of Ukraine, with some of them partially or destroyed. One of the company’s distribution centers near Brovary in Kyiv Oblast was destroyed during the hostilities. At the time, it contained 10,000 pallets of goods valued at ₴560 million.

Despite challenges, the chain continued to expand, opening new designer stores in Uzhhorod, Kyiv, and Rivne.

In response to the threat of blackouts, Silpo installed generators and Starlink terminals in its stores and introduced Svitalni — special zones offering Wi-Fi, charging stations, and workspace for guests.

In 2022, Silpo launched LOKO, a fast delivery service for both groceries and restaurant meals.

In 2023, Silpo opened 12 new designer stores, including a goblincore, neo-folk, Gaudí-inspired, and glassblowing crafts store.

Silpo became one of the first retailers in Ukraine authorized to use Nutri-Score color labels on its private label products.

=== 2024–2025 ===
In 2024, Silpo opened eight new supermarkets, with design inspirations ranging from prehistoric art to molecular gastronomy. There was a cyberculture store in collaboration with NAVI and a claymation-style concept.

In August, a mural reading “I’m Fine” appeared on the Silpo store in Kherson, inspired by a Ukrainian installation from the Burning Man festival. Earlier during the occupation of Kherson, the Russian occupiers defaced the store's decoration, and later damaged the facade during shelling.

On the night of December 20, 2024, a Russian missile strike destroyed a Silpo frozen goods warehouse in the Boryspil district, resulting in losses exceeding ₴400 million.

In January 2025, two new concept stores opened: Through the Looking Glass and Rose-Colored Glasses. In March, another designer store launched, themed around the Japanese concept of chindōgu.

In July, Silpo reopened a renovated thematic supermarket in Odesa on the French Boulevard, themed Dream Magic, and another updated store in the Simiya mall with the concept Message in a Bottle.

In August, a new concept store opened in Kyiv, inspired by the history of the Lypky district.

In September, the Kyiv store on Hryhorenka Avenue was redesigned under the theme The Art of Transformation.

In November, Silpo reopened a supermarket in Vasylkiv, themed around local majolica, and opened a new designer store in Chernihiv, inspired by the pumpkin.

== Store formats ==
=== Designer supermarkets ===
Since 2014, Silpo has opened supermarkets with individual thematic designs. Starting in 2018, all newly opened stores have featured original concepts, incorporating unique visual styles and artistic installations.

Each designer store follows a distinct theme, ranging from countries (e.g., Brazil, Japan) and cultural codes (e.g., Kabuki theatre, neo-folk, mythology), to artistic styles (e.g., loft punk, steampunk), tributes to iconic figures or works (e.g., Van Gogh, The Little Prince, Mavka), video games (S.T.A.L.K.E.R.), or internet subcultures (e.g., goblincore, retrofuturistic helicopters).

Since 2017, Silpo supermarkets have been regularly included in the Europe’s Finest Store list by European Supermarket Magazine.

As of 2024, the chain features over 100 designer supermarkets.

=== Le Silpo ===
Le Silpo is a chain of delicatessen markets known for their elegant interiors and premium product selection. Shelves feature high-end goods from around the world alongside items prepared by in-house culinary artisans.

As of 2024, there are four Le Silpo locations: three opened in 2013 (Kyiv, Dnipro, Kharkiv) and a fourth in Odesa in 2017.

In 2018, the Odesa Le Silpo was recognized by European Supermarket Magazine (ESM) for having one of the best innovative store designs in Europe.

== Labels, imports and production ==
Silpo offers private label products, exclusive imports, and in-house food production.

=== Private Labels ===
Since 2006, Silpo stores have carried private label products under brands such as Premiya and Povna Chasha. In 2013, the range was expanded with a children’s line called Premiya Riki-Tiki. Later additions included the premium brand Premiya Select, as well as new lines like Popster, Feels Good, Zelena Krayina (“Green Country”), and others. As of 2025, Silpo offers around 24 private-label brands.

=== Direct Imports ===
Silpo has developed a direct import strategy to source products from around the world without intermediaries. As of 2023, the company imported over 12,000 SKUs from around 60 countries. That same year, Silpo became the exclusive official partner in Ukraine of Vivino — the world’s largest wine community and mobile app.

=== The "Shop of Traditions" (Lavka Tradytsii) ===
The Shop of Traditions (Lavka Tradytsii) is a Silpo initiative to support small Ukrainian producers. Since 2011, the chain has offered farm products from local suppliers across various regions of Ukraine. In 2021, the Shop of Traditions joined the international Slow Food movement.

== Services ==
=== Vlasnyi Rakhunok ===
Vlasnyi Rakhunok (“Personal Account”) is Silpo’s loyalty program for regular guests. Guests earn bonus points (balobonuses) with each purchase, which can be redeemed for future shopping. The program is integrated into Silpo’s mobile app and its neobank, Bank Vlasnyi Rakhunok, launched in 2021 in partnership with Bank Vostok.

=== Mobile App ===
In 2018, Silpo launched its mobile application, which enables users to register for the loyalty program, browse promotions, track bonus points, pay for purchases using QR codes, and place online orders.

=== Online Orders ===
Since 2020, Silpo has been developing its online supermarket, offering home delivery and in-store pickup. In 2023, the company introduced long-distance delivery to locations up to 100 km from regional centers. As of 2024, this service is available in Volyn, Ivano-Frankivsk, Poltava, and Rivne regions.

=== LOKO ===
In 2022, Silpo launched LOKO, a fast delivery service that allows users to order both supermarket items and ready-made meals from partner restaurants.

== Social initiatives ==
Since the first days of Russia’s full-scale invasion of Ukraine, Silpo has been actively supporting the Armed Forces of Ukraine, charitable organizations, hospitals, orphanages, displaced persons, and others in need. As of 2024, the total value of aid provided exceeded ₴148 million.

In 2022, the company coordinated humanitarian aid deliveries in cooperation with international suppliers, Ukraine’s Ministry of Social Policy, and charitable foundations. During massive attacks on energy infrastructure, stores were equipped with generators and Starlink terminals, and Svitalni — safe spaces with power, Wi-Fi, and workstations — were opened for guests.

In 2023, Silpo sold a special batch of salt sourced from the mines of temporarily occupied Soledar, raising ₴58.5 million to purchase kamikaze drones. As part of the educational charity project Instoryky, ₴5 million was raised to purchase 7,000 medical kits.

In June 2024, Silpo launched a long-term campaign titled Plus for Life (Plyus na Zhyttia) in partnership with the Ptakhy initiative by volunteer Tata Kepler. The goal of the campaign is to raise ₴40 million to purchase tactical medical supplies for Ukraine’s Defence Intelligence (HUR), the Da Vinci Wolves Battalion, Azov Brigade, and the 3rd Assault Brigade. For each purchase of more than 500 specially marked items in Silpo stores or via shop.silpo.ua, ₴1 is donated to the cause.

Silpo has also established a dedicated internal unit focused on veteran support and the reintegration of mobilized employees through a program called Hephaestus (Hefest). As of 2025, more than 2,000 Silpo employees have been mobilized into the Armed Forces, and over 250 have returned to work after demobilization.

== See also ==
- Fozzy Group
- List of supermarket chains in Ukraine
