= Enver Tskitishvili =

Ukrainian politician (born 1961)

- Енвер Цкітішвілі
- An official portrait of Tskitishvili from 2002.

People's Deputy of Ukraine
- In office 14 May 2002 – 25 May 2006
- President: Leonid Kuchma

Personal details
- Born: Enver Omarovich Tskitishvili; 15 November 1961 (age 64) Kommunarsk, Ukrainian SSR, Soviet Union (now Alchevsk, Ukraine)
- Party: For United Ukraine! (2002); People's Party (2002-2004); Union (2004); Yulia Tymoshenko Bloc (2005); Party of Environmental Rescue "ECO+25%" (2006)
- Education: Donbas State Technical University

Enver Omarovich Tskitishvili (Ukrainian: Енвер Цкітішвілі; born 15 November 1961) is a Ukrainian politician and businessman who served as a People's Deputy of Ukraine in the Verkhovna Rada from 2002 to 2006 during the 4th convocation. In addition, as a businessman, he was the director and chairman of the Alchevsk Metallurgical Complex in his native city from 1999 to 2002, director of the Dnieper Metallurgical Combine in Kamianske from 2003 to 2004, director of the Makiivka Metallurgical Plant in Makiivka from 2008 to 2010, and the General Director of the Azovstal plant in Mariupol from 2010 to 2022. As director of Azovstal, he was involved with the plant during the War in the Donbas and subsequent Battle of Mariupol (May-June 2014). He remained director up to when it ultimately became a focal point during the Siege of Mariupol in 2022, which ended in its near-total destruction.

== Early life ==
Tskitishvili was born on 15 November 1961 in the city of Kommunarsk, which was then part of the Ukrainian SSR in the Soviet Union. He is ethnically Georgian, and his father was born in the city of Kutaisi there. As a child, he used to visit the city, and some of his relatives still reside there. At the time, Tskitishvili was passionate about association football, and planned to play it professionally. After finishing secondary school, he decided to pursue higher education and began attending what was then the Kommunarsky Industrial School (now the Donbas State Technical University). He graduated from the school in 1980 while working as a mechanic in the bar rolling shop of the Kommunarsk Metallurgical Plant (now the Alchevsk Metallurgical Complex). He left the job upon his graduation to complete his mandatory military service in the Soviet Army, which he did until 1982. After returning to Ukraine, he returned to the Kommunarsk Metallurgical Plant, where he worked at for a long time and gradually rose through the ranks from a metal heater to acting deputy general director for commercial ffairs and later acting chairman of the board.

In 1991, he also obtained a degree from the Kommunarsky Industrial School with a specialisation as an engineer-metallurgist.

== Business career ==
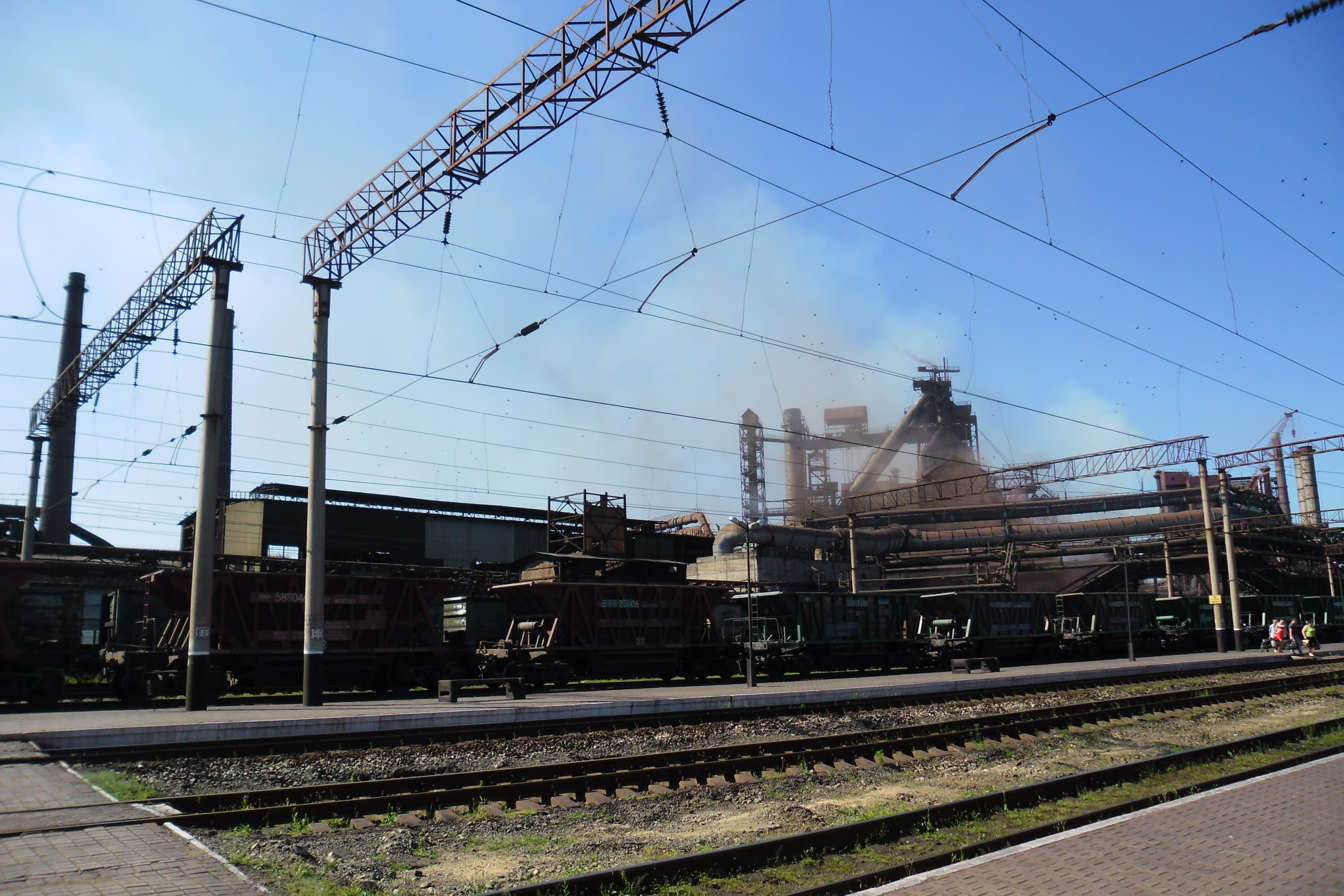
The Alchevsk Metallurgical Complex in Alchevsk, Ukraine, in 2012.

=== Alchevsk Iron and Steel Works (1999-2002) ===
Tskitishvili began his senior business career in 1999, when he became director of the now-renamed Alchevsk Metallurgical Complex, after having worked there for a long time. Tskitishvili was allegedly the preferred nominee of the Interpipe Group owned by oligarch Victor Pinchuk. Interpipe was one of three shareholders at the time of Alchevsk, alongside the Industrial Union of Donbas (ISD) and the Luhansk Oblast government. After Interpipe gave its stake to the ISD, he was given the choice of leaving in May 2002 for another company or joining politics, and he chose the latter option.

=== Dnieper Metallurgical Combine (2003-2004) ===
While still a deputy starting in late 2002, he became acting general director of the Dnieper Metallurgical Combine in Kamianske in 2003. He only held the post for nine months, and his directorship was attributed to the company preparing for privatisation. Under his brief tenure, around 110 million hryvnias went to repairs for the site, including the badly worn blast furnace, although it was confirmed that production would stop in April 2002 if an investor did not appear during the privatisation efforts under Tskitishvili because all the equipment was heavily outdated. The two final bidders ended up being ISD again and Privatbank, although he declined the bid from Privatbank because he said that they had never formalised a request, which he reportedly discussed with Mykhailo Chechetov. ISD was given the bid on 15 December 2003 for 711.549 million hryvnias under his tenure. After ISD took over, on 29 May 2004, the entire supervisory board of the plant was recalled, with Tskitishvili being dismissed in favour of Vitaliy Haiduk. Tskitishvili, however, was kept on the reserve of the supervisory board.

=== Makiivka Metallurgical Plant (2008-2010) ===
On 1 February 2008, Tskitishvili was appointed acting general director of the Makiivka Metallurgical Plant after Ihor Smiianenko resigned early. He was appointed general director by decree of the board on 18 March 2008. When he was later appointed to Azovstal, it was said that during his tenure at Makiivka he brought the company through the 2008 financial crisis, which required a series of changes to the plant to survive. He also led the company in putting into operation a new mill, which was announced in August 2008 with an estimated to cost nearly 660 million hryvnias and was designed by the domestic firm Krivorozhaglostroy of Kryvyi Rih. The mill was put into operation in July 2009 and cost about $160 million, and was planned to significantly expand the portfolio of the plant.

=== Azovstal (2010-2022) ===
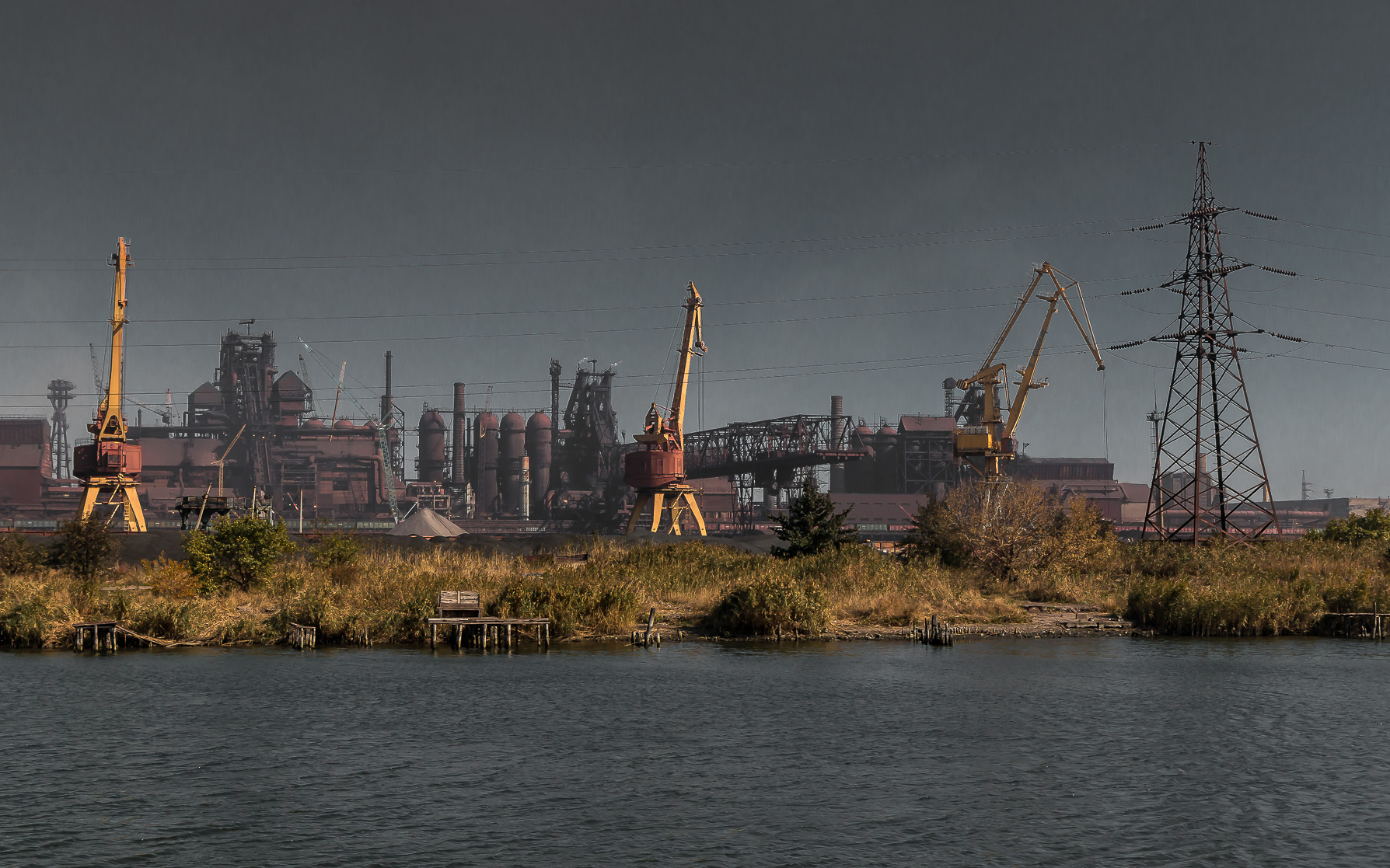
Azovstal under his directorship in 2014, shortly after its attempted capture.

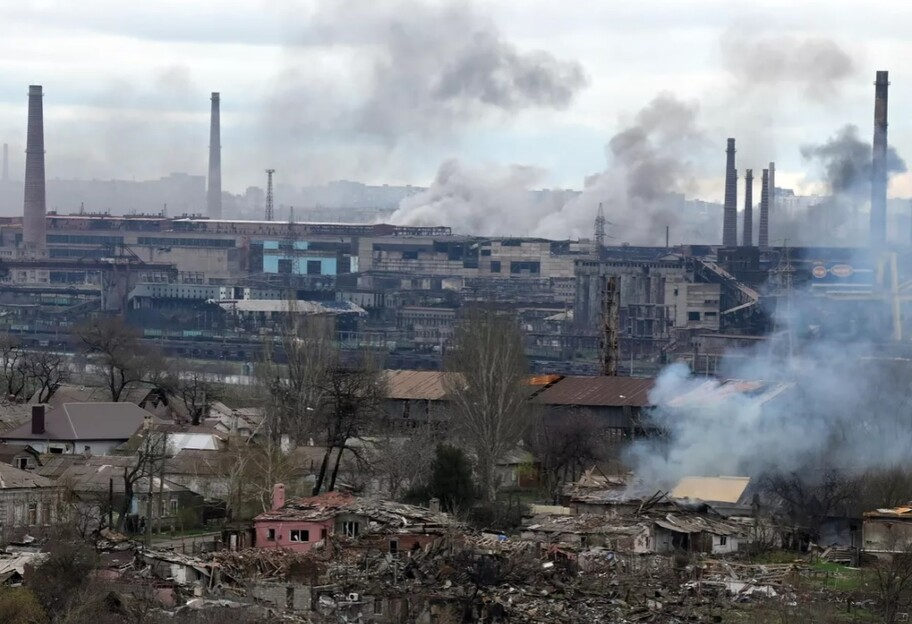
Azovstal in April 2022, when it was still being heavily shelled, and shortly after its capture by Russian forces in May.

On 23 September 2010, Dmytro Livshyts's resignation as Director of Azovstal, Tskitishvili was announced as the acting general director of the plant. He was confirmed as full director in April 2011, although by 2012 it was reported that the global rolled-metal market had collapsed, at least according to Tskitishvili. Thus, Azovstal lost numerous owners, and Ukrzaliznytsia said they would not be buying rails that season, which led to a significant decline in output. That year, the company lost 1.94 billion hryvnias. Two years later, during the War in the Donbas, Tskitishvili co-signed an appeal in April with Director of Illich Steel and Iron Works (also in Mariupol), Yuriy Zinechenko, which advocated against the violency and destabilisation due to the war. At the same time, the appeal supported decentralisation and the implementation of the Russian language regionally. A few days later he also signed a statement, together with SCM, which said that the company supported a united and independent Ukraine, with Metinvest (the owner of Azovstal) announcing that "people's squads" would start patrolling the city. He also helped workers in clearing barricades. With the outbreak of the Battle of Mariupol in May between the DPR and the government, Tskitishvili said that the company would implement a stoppage in protest of separatism and the DPR, and by June when it became clear that the government had won he said he supported the National Guard of Ukraine and the police. Tskitishvili also said the operation "was the only way out". The bunkers under Azovstal were also used during the battle.

After this, the plant began to gradually recover, with Tskitishvili advocating against mass scrap exports by the Ukrainian government in order to improve the domestic sector. However, in 2018, protestors outside the administration building of Azovstal demanded his removal, with a union of Azovstal workers accusing him of leading the company while it had labour safety and pay issues, with lawsuits pending. The union also said he was an ineffective manager, although nothing came of this. He was still director when the Russian invasion of Ukraine began, and upon its start he announced that the plant planned to go in idle shortly thereafter with the Siege of Mariupol starting. All of the blast furnaces and coke ovens were shut down by March, although Tskitishvili said that some staff would be retained to monitor everything, especially with the shelling of the site. He also promised the plant would be rebuilt. After the siege continued for months and eventually with Azovstal being used as the last pocket of Ukrainian resistance in the city, he said that the plant would continue to be used to defend the city with the bunkers being capable of withstanding a nuclear strike. In early May, he also that he did not expect the war to be as genocidal and inhumane as it was. After the Ukrainian government surrendered in late May, he stopped being director as the plant was practically destroyed and in Russian hands.

== Political career ==
In 2002, Tskitishvili entered politics, running in the 2002 Ukrainian parliamentary elections in constituency No. 106 (Luhansk Oblast). He was nominated by the electoral bloc For United Ukraine!, and ultimately won the election with 40.35% of the vote against 8 other opponents. Upon entering the Rada, he remained a member of For United Ukraine! only for a few months and also joined the Committee on Industrial Policy and Entrepreneurship at the same time. After leaving For United Ukraine! in July 2002, he joined the People's Party, an agrarian party, where he remained for nearly two years until May 2004, when he left it for the "Union" faction in the parliament. He remained there for exactly a year before defecting to the Yulia Tymoshenko Bloc in May 2005 after it gained more power following the Orange Revolution and Yulia Tymoshenko becoming Prime Minister of Ukraine, as the bloc nearly doubled its seats by September 2005. However, it was announced in September 2005 that he would be expelled from the bloc's ranks after he was one of seven of its deputies who supported the candidacy of Yuriy Yekhanurov for the post of Prime Minister of Ukraine after Tymoshenko was dismissed. During the four years he remained in parliament for the 4th convocation, he did not submit a single bill, and only submitted 3 amendments while being absent 65% of the time. In December 2005, it was announced that he would join the small ecological party, the party of Environmental Rescue "ECO+25%", led by Igor Rozhok. During the 2006 Ukrainian parliamentary elections, Tskitishvili then attempted to run for re-election with the party via its party list as No. 12 on it, but was not selected.

== Personal life ==
He is married and has a daughter, Yulia, who got married in 2013.
