= Oleg Mkrtchyan =

Ukrainian businessman (born 1966)

- Олег Мкртчян
- Born: 7 August 1966 (age 60); Armavir, Russian SFSR, Soviet Union (now Russia)
- Education: Stavropol Polytechnic Institute
- Occupation: Businessman
- Known for: Co-owner and CEO of the Industrial Union of Donbas

Oleg Artushevich Mkrtchyan (also transliterated as Oleh Mkrtchan; Ukrainian: Олег Артушевич Мкртчян; Russian: Олег Артушевич Мкртчан; born 7 September 1966) is a Russian and formerly Ukrainian oligarch and businessman. From 2002 to 2019, he was one of three co-owners and the general director of the Industrial Union of Donbas (ISD), which owns numerous enterprises within eastern Ukraine, most of which are metallurgical. He was also the co-owner of multiple association football clubs, including Metalurh Donetsk in Ukraine, FC Urartu in Armenia, and FC Kuban Krasnodar in Russia. In 2019, he was convicted of embezzlement of more than a billion rubles in a Russian court and was sentenced to nine years in a general corrective labour colony, although he was released early in 2025 due to health issues.

== Early life ==
Mkrtchyan was born on 7 September 1966 in the city of Armavir, which was then part of the Russian SSR in the Soviet Union. He is ethnically Armenian. As a child, he attended a sports boarding school in the Armenian capital of Yerevan, and even played for the youth national team of the Armenian SSR. In 1988, he graduated from the Stavropol Polytechnic Institute in Stavropol, Russian SSR, with a degree in process engineering.

== Business career ==
=== Industrial Union of Donbas ===
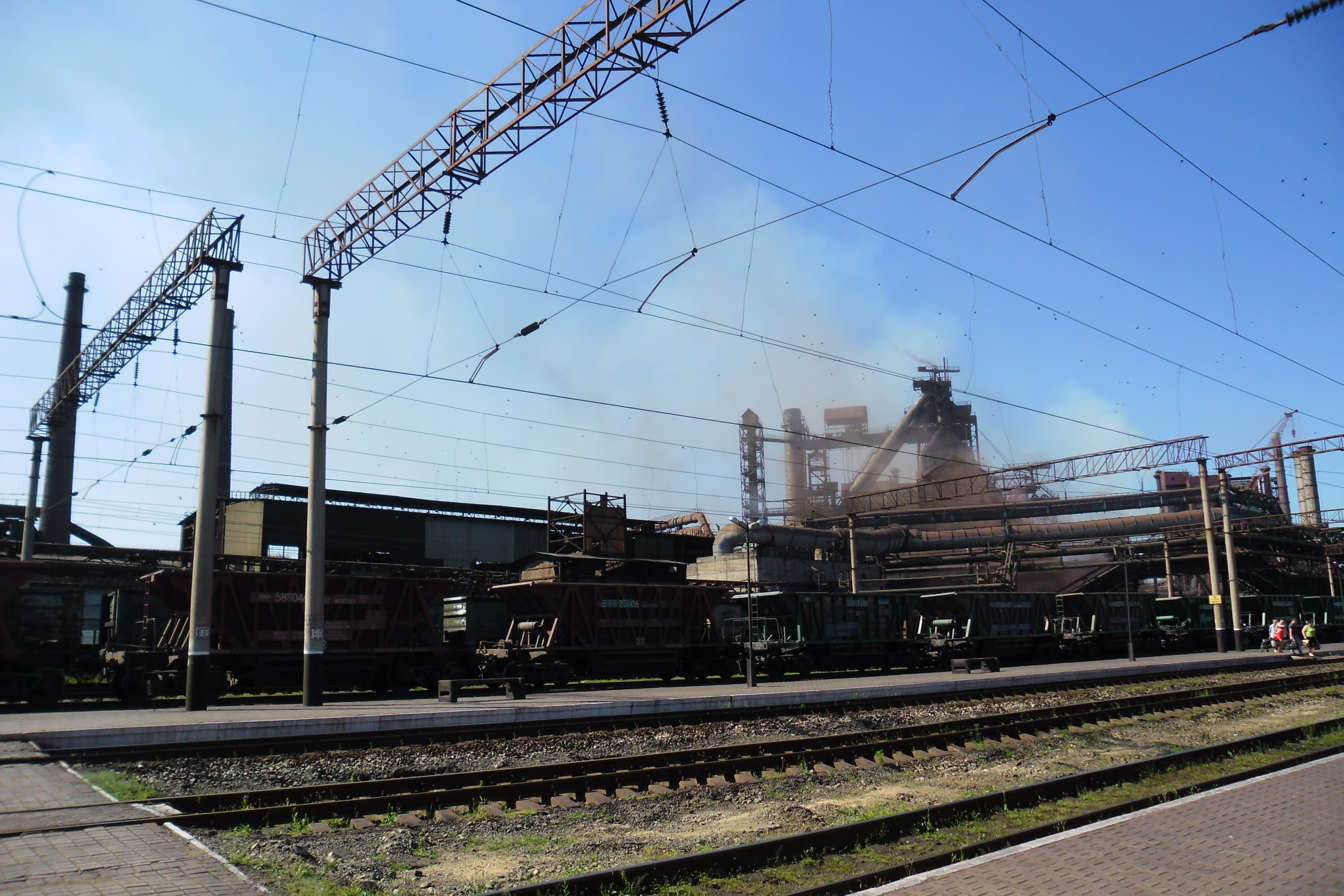
Alchevsk Metallurgical Complex, which ISD owns.

In 1997, Mkrtchyan joined the Industrial Union of Donbas (ISD) to head the metallurgy department. The department was specifically created by Serhiy Taruta for Mkrtchyan when he joined ISD, as ISD originally focused on gas operations. Allegedly, the two had known each other since the early 1990s, when Mkrtchyan was a trader near Azovstal, with Taruta working within the sales department of Azovstal. Mkrtchyan would end up heading the department for only five years, as he was promoted to becoming one of the three partners and co-owners of ISD in 2002. This occurred after Vitaliy Haiduk split from Taruta when he was appointed Deputy Prime Minister of Ukraine. Taruta retained the chairmanship of the board of ISD, while Mkrtchyan was appointed as general director, running operations and the structuring of the enterprises within ISD. Mkrtchyan then held a joint 49.9% ownership of the company with Taruta as co-owners, or a 25% stake in ISD as a shareholder, depending on the source.

Under Mkrtchyan's tenure, ISD increased and consolidated its stakes in Alchevsk, namely the Alchevsk Metallurgical Complex (AMK) and Alchevsk coke plant, with AMK being entirely rebuilt from 2003 to 2013. ISD also bought out the Dnieper Metallurgical Combine in 2003 for 98.81% of the company at 711.549 million hryvnias, which also led to large reconstruction efforts beginning in February 2004. Over the next few years, ISD also bought out multiple metallurgical enterprises in Poland and Hungary and plants in Fujairah and in his native Armvair. The Armvair plant, specifically, was built starting in 2008 for 1.5 billion rubles, although it was later finished and built more towards Krasnodar, with Mkrtchyan signing on to invest in projects in Armvair in return. However, between 2009-10, a significant amount of ISD's stake was bought out by a consortium via the Russian VEB, which included investors headed by Alexander Katunin. The investments were worth $8 billion for 50% and 2 shares. Other sources described the real owners as VEB; the company could not buy foreign assets directly, so it did so through intermediaries. Management was allowed to stay within Ukraine after the buyout, including Mkrtchyan, although in practice VEB appointed Yevhen Potapov as the financial director of ISD, and most major decisions had to be approved by Potapov.

After the War in the Donbas, Mkrtchyan said that ISD retained most of its assets, although the company lost control of the assets in Alchevsk once a trade blockade began in 2016. ISD eventually lost control of the Alchevsk enterprises to the pro-Russian, separatist Luhansk People's Republic in November 2017, which led to Mkrtchyan appealing to a court in Russia, although nothing ended up happening. In 2021, the Dnieper Metallurgical Combine was sold off with the main asset of ISD being ISD Dunaferr in Hungary at this point, although by that point Mkrtchyan was not formally involved anymore with the company due to him being in prison in Russia.

=== Sports ===
==== Metalurh Donetsk ====
Mkrtchyan, as one of the co-owners of ISD, was also involved with the ISD-created Metalurh Donetsk and was one of its co-owners together with Taruta and Haiduk. Donetsk had existed for around five seasons after being revived in the 1990s, and ISD became its sponsor in 2001. Although Taruta was formally president of the club, Mkrtchyan was in charge of most of the matters of the club, with Mkrtchyan extensively corresponding with coaches about squad picks He was also credited with selecting Henrikh Mkhitaryan to the team because of his Armenian heritage. Up until December 2014, Mkrtchyan remained the club's main investor, although by 2015 the club folded due to funding issues.

==== FC Kuban Krasnodar ====
In November 2007, Mkrtchyan himself acquired 50% stake in FC Kuban Krasnodar in Russia from Oleg Deripaska after it was relegated from the Russian Premier League. In 2008, Deripaska gave his 50% away to the regional administration of Krasnodar Krai, which put it up for auction at nearly 1.5 billion rubles, which Mkrtchyan ultimately won. Mkrtchyan in the end had 75% of the stakes of the clu at that point, which he held through ISK-Invest, while 25% of the region was owned by the krai. Mkrtchyan then appointed his nephew, Suren, as general director of the club while his uncle became the financier of Kuban. ISD was also brought in upon Mkrtchyan buying the club, with the company supplying most of the club's budget. Under Mkrtchyan, Kuban eventually won promotion back to the Premier league and played in the Europa League, for which he would be awarded the "Hero of Labour of Kuban" for.

At the same time, though, he was accused of only ever visiting the club every couple of months, with a long-time friend, Serhiy Doronchenko, handling much of the club, who dismissed the team's coach, which led to multiple departures. After the start of the War in the Donbas, Mkrtchyan stopped funding the club, and he sold off some of his stakes while the krai started taking ownership of the club. By July, he said he no longer had anything to do with the club, and for some time retained influeence through Doronchenko but he ultimately left after Ivelin Popov was sold off, which Mkrtchyan disagreed with. Despite this, Mkrtchyan at the same time said that the club would invest in a new stadium after it was not selected as a host city for the 2018 World Cup, although others accused Mkrtchyan of never planning to build the arena. A few months later, in September, it was confirmed that he was no longer financing the club, and that he had asked Veniamin Kondratyev to leave entirely. He finally withdraw form Kuban in April 2016, and gave up his shares to the state, although the debts of the club were very high when he left.

==== Other clubs ====
Mkrtchyan eventually also bought out FC Urartu, a club in Yerevan, Armenia, that was known as FC Banants at that point. The club was formerly owned by Dzhevan Cheloyants, a Russian business partner. He called Banants a "social project" until he eventually gave the stake in the club back to Cheloyants in 2016, when he also pulled out of Kuban. After Banants, he became a chief investor in Torpedo Armavir in his hometown, bringing in Valery Karpin as coach for the club. However, that same season, the club was relegated to the Russian First League, and although he continued to retain the club for some time, he eventually gave it to Cheloyants upon his conviction in 2019. Cheloyants said that he could return to the club if he wished, although it would eventually be dissolved in 2020. In addition to the other two, there were rumours in December 2014 that he was planning to invest in and develop Anzhi Makhachkala, a Russian club in Dagestan, but only if the club would return to the Russian Premier League of Russia. Said Kerimov was eventually reported to have become a partner in Anzhi with him, although the deal eventually fell apart.

== Personal life ==
He is married and has four sons. His son, Eduard, who graduated from Moscow State University, took over parts of Oleg's assets in 2015, including projects in Kramatorsk and scrap processing, giving him a net worth of around $200 million. It was theorised by the media that the transfer was to avoid confiscation of the assets.

Mkrtchyan has lived mostly in Russia after the War in the Donbas. It was reported that he gave up his Ukrainian citizenship for Russian citizenship after Euromaidan.

=== Wealth and rankings ===
Mkrtchyan, due to the scale of his holdings and wealth, is often identified as a Ukrainian oligarch and was included as part of the group in an economic study by Demid Chernenko in 2018.

In terms of the wealthiest people in Ukraine, he has been included in the list made by Korrespondent during the following years with the estimated wealth of:

- 2008 - $2.37 billion, 13th richest person in Ukraine
- 2009 - $753 million, 8th richest person in Ukraine
- 2010 - $1.06 billion, 12th richest person in Ukraine
- 2011 - $730 million, 16th richest person in Ukraine
- 2012 - $753 million, 16th richest in Ukraine
- 2013 - $663 million, 17th richest person in Ukraine
- 2014 - $2.4 billion, 13th richest person in Ukraine

=== Legal issues ===
In early February 2018, it was first reported that he was arrested at the Tverskoy District of Moscow at a Ritz-Carlton hotel. The case for his arrest came from the Investigative Committee of Russia, which referred to a report from Department K of the FSB. Upon his arrest, he was ordered to be detained until April on charges of large-scale fraud. Mkrtchyan's lawyer, while defending him, called the matter a "corporate dispute", while Taruta said that the bank credit funds that were alleged to be part of the fraud financed ISD. His detention was then extended multiple times until 5 January 2019, while the Moscow City Court stopped extending it. According to prosecutors at the time, Mkrtchyan had raised multiple loans through VEB for enterprises of the ISD, but had moved the money from the loans into an offshore company that he controlled. It was also reported that the borrower was Cypriot Margit Holding Ltd, which was controlled by VEB, but had passed around 85 billion rubles to AMK in turn for shares of AMK. As the general director of ISD, Mkrtchyan was alleged to have organised these repayments, but he had stopped funding the loans. In order to cover up the alleged fraud, it was said that he had paid interest to VEB for multiple years. In total, the amount that he was accused of embezzling was around a billion rubles, according to the court.

The trial for the case was held in August behind closed doors at the Moscow City Court because it was alleged to involve state-secret material. Mkrtchyan was ultimately sentenced on 16 August 2019 to nine years in a general corrective labour colony, and was fined 900,000 rubles. The nine years was the amount that the prosecutors had asked for him to be sentenced to. Only parts of the decision were read out due to it being behind closed doors, with the court finding him guilty of fraud through loans. He said he did not plead guilty after his defense said that they would appeal. While in prison, it was reported in 2021 that most of his assets were declared insolvent, and that multiple cases had been brought forth in court to seize the companies he owned, although seven claims were rejected due to the Russian courts saying that it could not be proven that he himself had acquired the companies. On 1 May 2025, he was released early due to health issues, and it was reported that he was in intensive care at a hospital and was given less than a year to live. Other sources reported that the treatment was done in Yerevan, and that he had been permitted to travel long distances for the treatment.

== Honours and awards ==
Mkrtchyan has been awarded the following:

- Defender of the Motherland medal (for the development of the coal industry in the Donbas, 1999)
- Miner's Glory Medal, 3rd degree (2001)
- Miner's Glory Medal, 2nd degree (2002)
