= Zachativka =

Zachativka (Ukrainian: Зачатівка) may refer to several small populated places in Ukraine:

- Zachativka (village), Volnovakha Raion, Donetsk Oblast
- Zachativka (rural settlement), Volnovakha Raion, Donetsk Oblast
- Zachativka, Horlivka Raion, Donetsk Oblast
