= Rivnopil =

Rivnopil may refer to:

- Rivnopil, Khlibodarivka rural hromada, Volnovakha Raion, Donetsk Oblast
- Rivnopil, Velyka Novosilka settlement hromada, Volnovakha Raion, Donetsk Oblast
