= Sukha Balka mine =

Iron mine in Kryvyi Rih, Ukraine

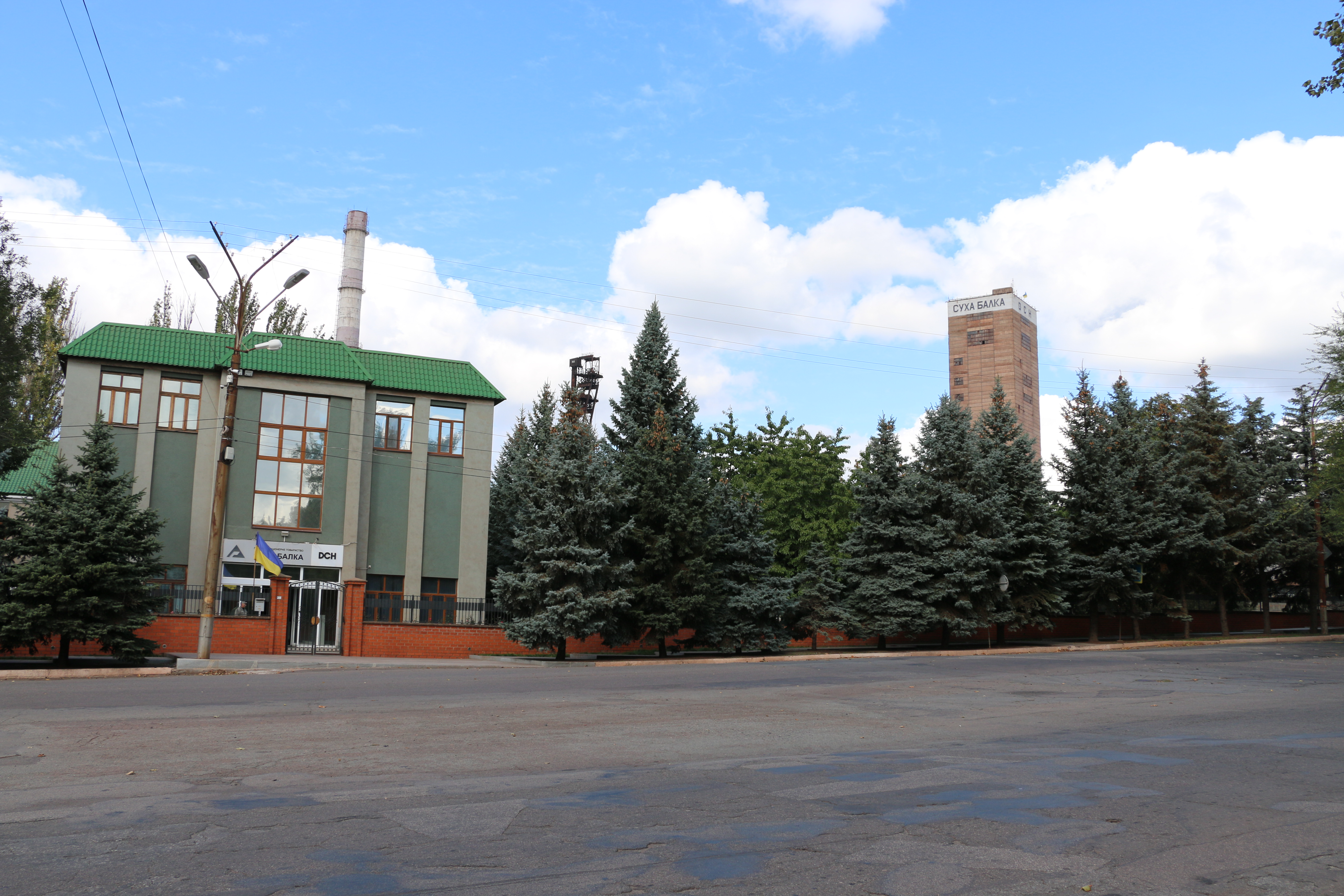
- Interactive map of Sukha Balka mine
- Location: Kryvyi Rih, Dnipropetrovsk Oblast, Ukraine; 48°2′0″N 33°28′0″E
- Products: Iron ore
- Website: https://sukhabalka.com/

The Sukha Balka mine is a large iron mine located in the Pokrovskyi District of the city of Kryvyi Rih in Dnipropetrovsk Oblast, Ukraine.

== Ownership ==
Larisa Chertok's Gehold SA privatized a stake in Sukha Balka, by 2008 Palmrose Ltd. controlled by Boholyubov and her brother Ihor Kolomoyskyi was the main owner of Sukha Balka which was sold for over $1 billion to Russia’s Evraz group, part-owned by Roman Abramovich. It is currently owned by the DCH (Development Construction Holding) of the Ukrainian business and investor Oleksandr Yaroslavskyi. Among DCH's other holder are the Dnieper Metallurgical Combine and the Kharkiv Tractor Plant.
