= Kharkiv Tractor Plant =

Factory in Ukraine

Kharkiv Tractor Plant (HTZ)
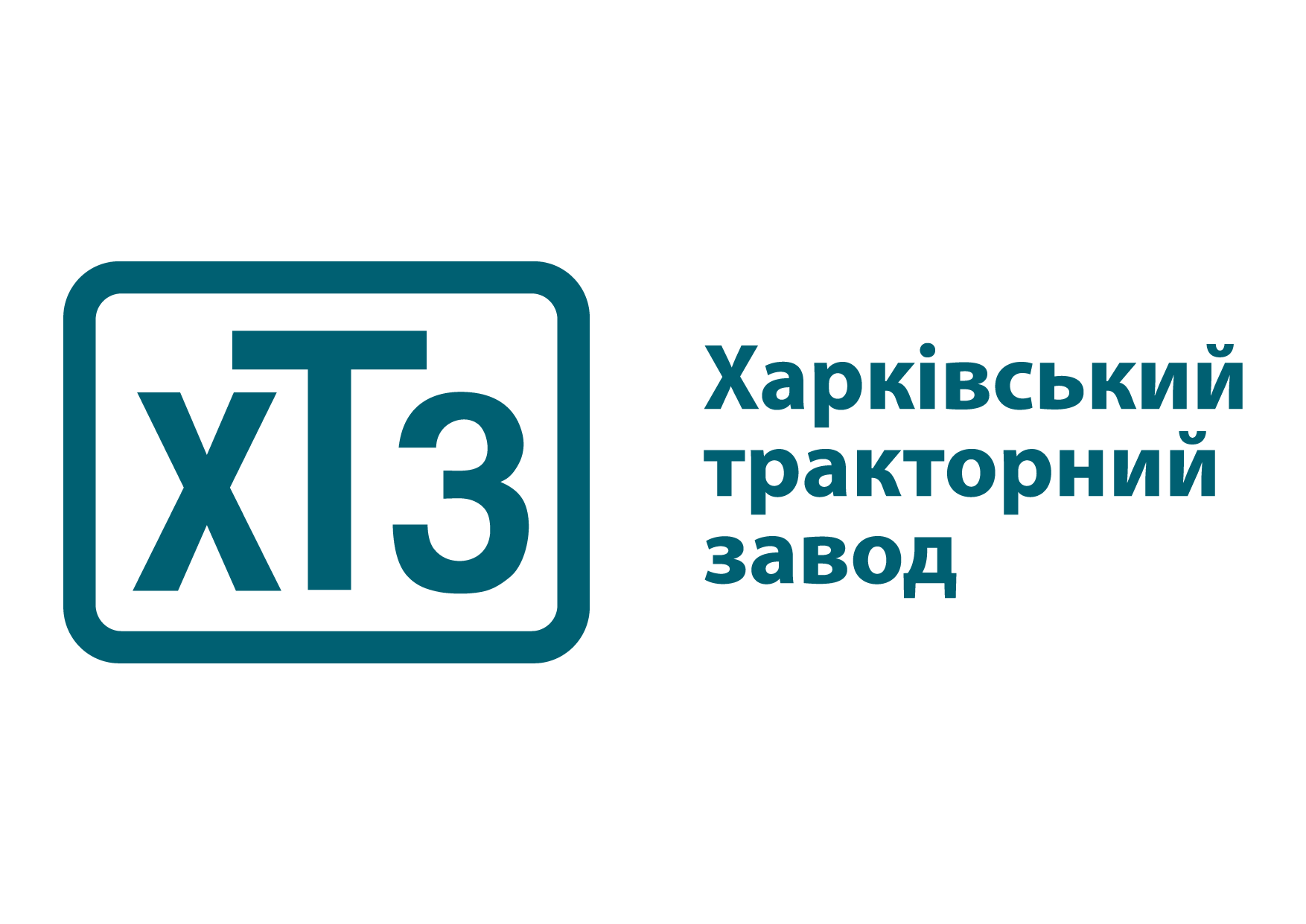

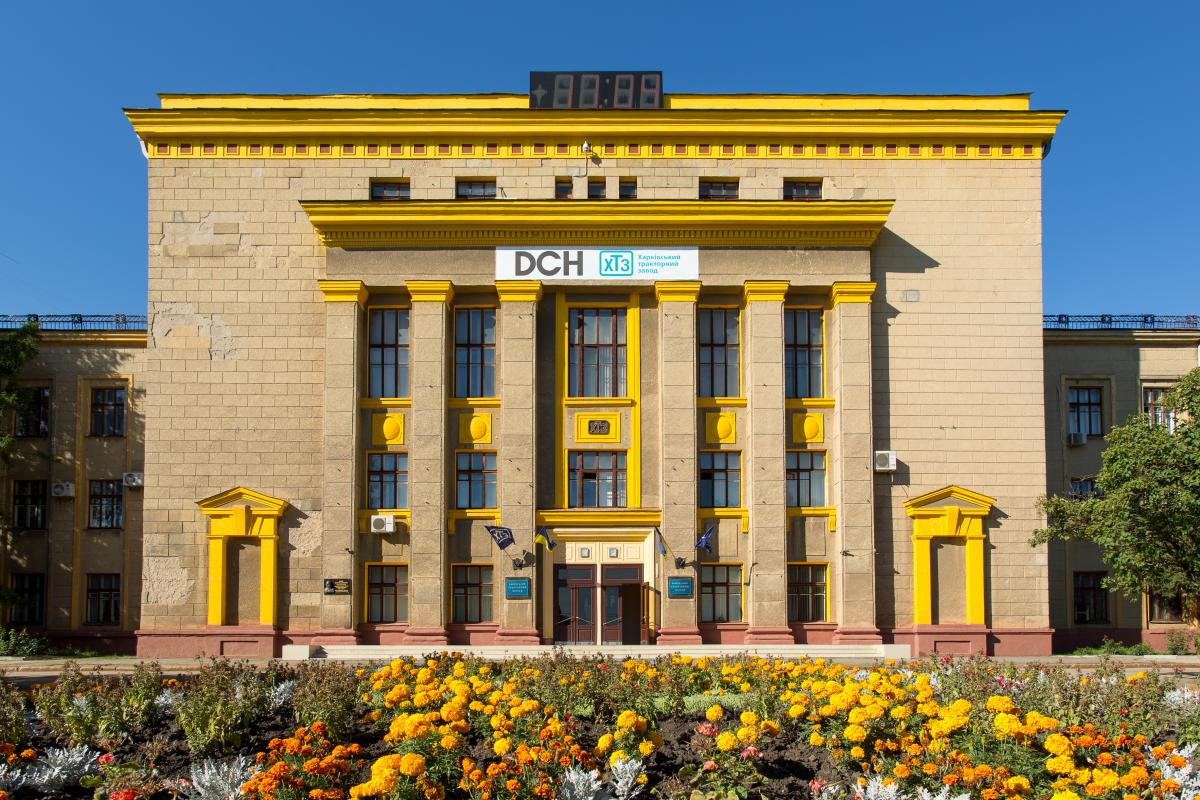
- Native name: Харківський тракторний завод
- Type: Public company
- Industry: Agricultural machinery
- Founded: 1930
- Headquarters: Kharkiv, Ukraine
- Products: Tractors
- Number of employees: 1000
- Parent: DCH
- Website: xtz.ua

Kharkiv Tractor Plant (KhTZ or HTZ) (Ukrainian: Харківський тракторний завод, ХТЗ, romanized: Kharkivskyi Traktornyi Zavod) is an agricultural machinery manufacturer in the Ukrainian city of Kharkiv. Established in 1930–31, as a centerpiece of Stalin's First Five-Year Plan for Soviet industrialization (1927–32), KhTZ was Ukraine's largest tractor manufacturer, producing both wheeled and tracked tractors. In 2016, the Ukrainian security service (SBU) alleged that at the Kremlin's direction the Russian owners were planning to decommission the enterprise. The industrial plant was reported destroyed by extensive shelling and resulting fires on the fourth day of the Russian invasion of Ukraine in February 2022.

== History ==
=== Building of the Plant in the First Five Year Plan ===
The Kharkiv Tractor Plant, on the south-east edge of Kharkiv, was one of three major tractor plants (the others at Stalingrad and Chelyabinsk) built as "giants of the first five-year plan", and was named, after the Commissar for Heavy Industry, the Sergo Ordzhonikidze Kharkiv Tractor Works. In the 1920s tractors had been seen as a way of improving agricultural production and persuading the peasantry of the merits of the regime and voluntary collectivisation. But by the spring of 1929 it was reported that there were only five collectives in Ukraine with significant agricultural output.

In the first five-year plan inaugurated in 1928, tractor production was linked with Stalin's policy of forced collectivisation and 'the liquidation of the kulaks as a class'. in this project, tractors became even more important symbolically and practically - to increase output and to compensate for the widespread loss of horses which were slaughtered in peasant resistance to forced collectivisation.

The plant was constructed upon designs formulated by Detroit architect Albert Kahn, the designer for Henry Ford, for the similar scale tractor factory in Stalingrad. Although not a carbon copy of the Stalingrad plant in terms of either material or labor, it was an early example of architectural standardization in the USSR. Stalin described the project as "a steel bastion of the collectivisation of agriculture in the Ukraine" and trusted that the workers and the engineering and technical personnel would "overcome the difficulties of the young enterprise" by utilizing the experience of the Stalingrad Works".

Construction of the plant began in April 1930 in the steppe behind the station of Losevo, located 15 kilometers southeast of Kharkiv. The aim was a plant that would eventually make almost everything needed for a tractor from the iron and steel to the most complex parts. Construction involved some 10,000 workers, 2000 horses, 90 million bricks, 160,000 tons of steel and 100,000 tons of iron. The building workers were former peasants escaping collectivisation, demobilised Red Army soldiers and some members of the Komsomolsk. They lived in primitive conditions in some 1500 wooden barracks.

Bricks were made on site with kilns constructed for the purpose and using local clay - some of which was dug out of the foundations. Materials were often hauled by hand and sleds. There were few machines - 24 powered concrete mixers and 4 gravel crushers. Building techniques often had to be learned on site by workers who in the past might only have built wooden peasant houses with their brick stoves.

Workers were encouraged by the propaganda of the time which praised heroes like the bricklayer Arkady Mikunis who was said to have laid 12,000 bricks in a day in a contrived example of fast work or a young woman, Varva Shmel, who went from being a peasant girl to a mechanic. The plant had its own newspaper (Temp) and agitators. Forms of socialist competition were used and slackers could be punished by denunciation on wall newspapers.

The shell of the plant was completed by July 1931. Some 500 specially selected workers were sent on special training courses in Moscow and Leningrad to learn how to use the new imported equipment. The first test tractors were produced in August and full production begun in October 1931. The opening of the plant was a major propaganda event both in the Ukrainian SSR and the wider USSR.

=== The Factory in the 1930s ===
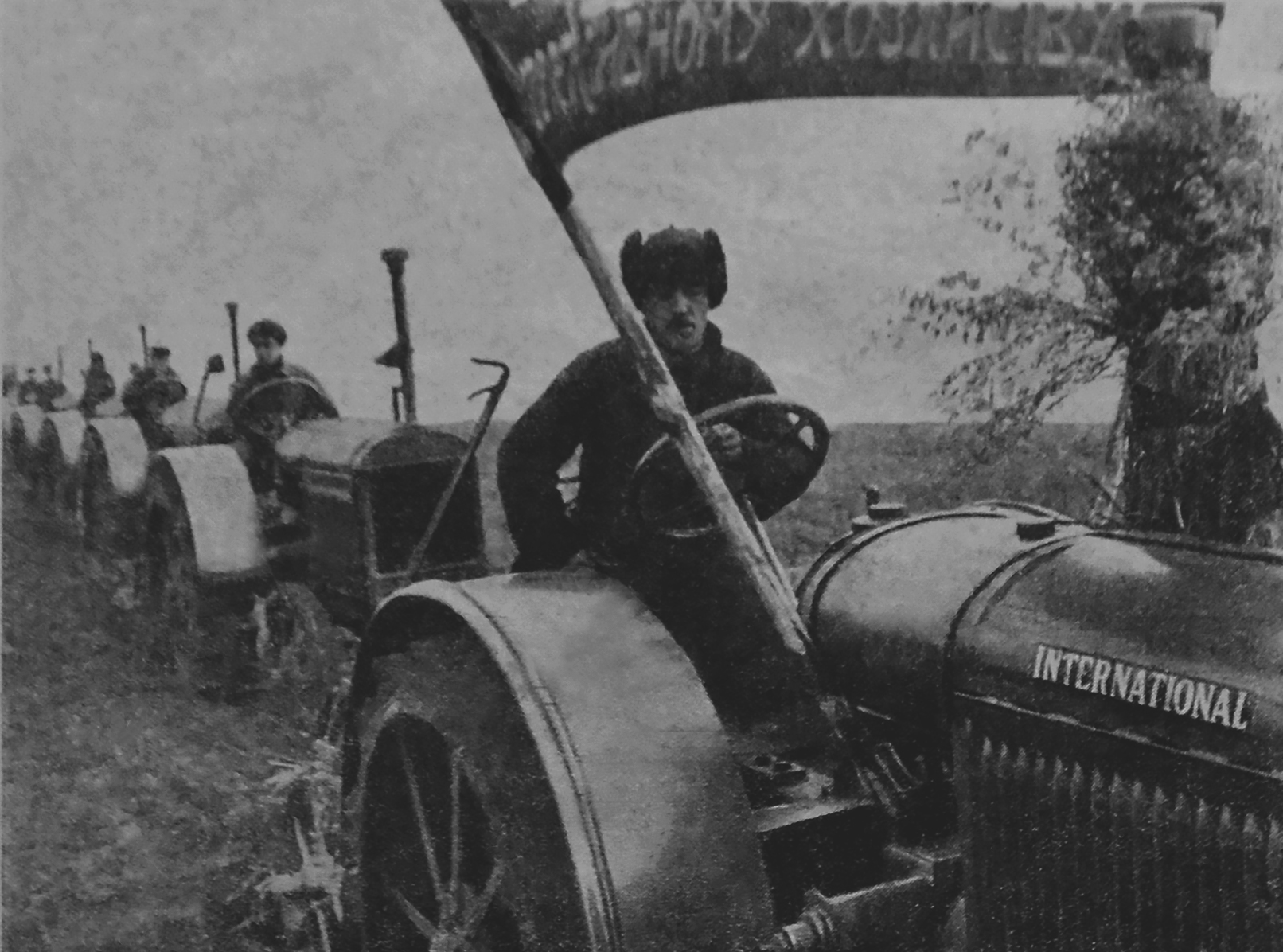
McCormick-Deering 15-30 (International Harvester), locally produced as KhTZ 15–30. Ukrainian SSR 1931

In October 1931, the plant started the production of the SXTZ 15/30 wheel-type tractors, which was equipped with a 30-horsepower kerosene engine and developed a speed of 7.4 km / h. The tractor was a copy of the “International 15/30” tractor produced by the American company International Harvester. The first director of the plant was P. I. Svistun. By the following year, In 1932, 17 374 tractors came off the assembly line and the works was awarded the Order of Lenin. In 1936, the 150,000th tractor is said to have left the plant.

On September 17, 1937, the KhTZ began serial production of the caterpillar tractor SXTZ-NATI. This was the first mass-produced tractor of Soviet design.

On the plant's opening in 1931, American Communist Fred Beal was appointed director of Propaganda and Cultural Relations for its colony of several hundred foreign workers and specialists, mostly Americans, Germans and Czechoslovaks. Under his name, Moscow published a Pictorial Survey of their contribution to "socialist construction". In this, Beal admitted only to the voluntary renunciation of "luxuries". Later, he was to give a very different account. The colony suffered acute shortages of food and fuel, but was "divided by a chasm from the ten thousand Russian workers employed". To protest their conditions, these workers resorted to the only weapon open to them, "silent sabotage". Meanwhile, the crowds of the hungry and dispossessed who daily besieged the foreign colony were regularly trucked out into countryside and abandoned in deserted villages and on wasteland.

"Engineers" often picked for their political loyalty, would be rushed through their schooling and let loose upon the factory where they would seek to correct the work of the distrusted foreign specialists. The result was breakable parts, ruined machinery and hampered production. According to Beal, who remained until the summer of 1933, "the average tractor sent out from the plant had a very short life".

The bosses of the plant and some of its workers were inevitably caught up in the purges of the later 1930s. These included the party agitator Boris Bibikov, who was shot as a Trotskyite but who it seems had sympathised with Kirov. Part of his story is told by his grandson, Owen Matthews, in an English language family memoir. Amongst the accusations made in these cases were various forms of sabotage in the plant including breaking machines, delaying the payment of wages etc.

=== World War II, The Great Patriotic War ===
During the Second World War, the plant's equipment was evacuated to Stalingrad and then to Rubtsovsk, in the Altai Krai in Siberia. There it was the basis of the M. I. Kalinin Altai Tractor Plant, which began production in 1942. The original Kharkiv plant itself was almost completely destroyed during the war.

On 24 October 1941, after a four-day battle, Kharkiv and the district was occupied by German forces. On 14 December, the German Stadtkommandant ordered the Jewish population to be concentrated in a hut settlement near the KhTZ. In two days, 20,000 Jews were gathered there. Those Jews that an SS Sonderkommando did not shoot were killed throughout January in a gas van.

When Kharkiv was liberated by Soviet forces for the final time in August 1943, work immediately began on rebuilding the factory. Production restarted at the end of 1944.

=== Soviet Era to 1991 ===
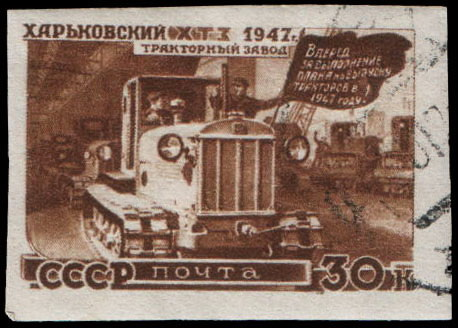
Kharkiv Tractor Plant on a 1947 stamp

From 1949 the plant made the DT-54 diesel tractor, the main ploughing tractor used in agriculture until 1962. From 1954 to 1972 the plant also produced a wheel-type row-crop tractor with a tractive force of 0.6 tons-force. In 1962 the T-74 ploughing tractor went into production. The plant produced its millionth tractor in 1967. During the ninth five-year plan (1971–75) the T-150K was introduced. The Soviet era factory was awarded the Order of the Red Banner of Labour in 1948, another Order of Lenin in 1967, and the Order of Georgi Dimitrov in 1975.

In the 1980s, the plant achieved maximum productivity – the output was up to 70,000 tractors a year. For small farms and small jobs, low-power tractors with engines from 12 to 24 hp, such as XTZ-7, DT-14, T-19, T-20 and T-25 were produced, as well as the medium powered DT-54 and DT-75. By the beginning of 1986 the plant was supplying tractors to 36 countries and prepared production of new models of large-capacity wheeled tractors: T-150 km and T-150K-02.

=== Post-Soviet era ===
In 1994, two years after the collapse of the Soviet Union and the independence of Ukraine, the plant was transformed into an open joint stock company. In the early 21st century the plant was producing tractors, including general purpose wheeled tractors XTZ-17221 and XTZ-17222, and upgraded the T-150 series, the wheeled arable XTZ-16131, the crawler-type XTZ-181, the farmers' ХТZ-3510, wheel loaders ХТZ-156.

In addition to tractors, the Kharkiv Tractor Plant (HTZ) produced military products – artillery tractors ATL. In the 2000s it was producing light multi-purpose tractors MT-LB and self-propelled 2S1 Gvozdika howitzers.

=== The KhTZ District ===
In 1936, Ordzhonikidzevskyi, the "socialist city" (sotsgorod) that developed around the plant to house its workers, had been named like the factory after Sergo Ordzhonikidze (who died the following year). In February 2016, twenty-five years after the break up of the Soviet Union, it was renamed Industrialnyi District to comply with decommunization laws. The popular name for neighbourhood was, and has remained, "KhTZ", with a reputation of being one of the more socially deprived areas of the Kharkiv.

=== Alleged Russian plot against the plant in 2016 ===
In 2007, the local investor Oleksandr Yaroslavskyi sold his majority stake in the concern to the Russian billionaire Oleg Deripaska. In 2006 Deripaska had been described in leaked U.S. diplomatic cables as "among the 2–3 oligarchs [Russian President Vladimir] Putin turns to on a regular basis".

In 2016, after the Ukraine government had sold its near-30 percent stake as part of an extensive sell-off of businesses to private enterprise, the Security Service of Ukraine (SBU) said that it had foiled a plot by the management of Deripaska's industrial group to effectively dismantle the Kharkov Tractor Plant, which was then still producing 60 per cent of the tractors sold in Russia. On the instructions of the Russian owners, the new General Director of the factory, appointed in March 2016, is said to have prepared the foundry equipment, technical and design papers, blueprints, etc. for dismantling and export. It was also reported that the Director was preparing to dismiss nearly a third of the workers. A corresponding order had been issued and a new staff list approved.

The SBU said "implementation of these plans would lead to a complete cessation of the Kharkiv Tractor Plant activities and sabotage of the Ministry of Defense order". The SBU seized control of the plant's property and accounts, a move that it says prevented the loss of production equipment and unique blueprints and saved nearly a thousand skilled workers from dismissal.

In late April 2016, with the support of Austrian businessman Siegfried Wolf, who had been the nominal owner of the plant under Deripaska's direction, Yaroslavskyi's DCH groups resumed a controlling stake in the company. Among the other assets of DCH (Development Construction Holding) are the Sukha Balka Iron Ore Mine and the Dnieper Metallurgical Combine.

In November 2018, the Russian Federation put Yaroslavskyi on a sanctions list. Sanctions were also imposed on the companies belonging to DCH, including the Kharkiv Tractor Plant. Yaroslavskyi described restrictive economic measures as a "political issue".

=== Plans for Ecopolis HTZ, 2022 ===
On the 90th anniversary of the Kharkiv Tractor Plant, 1 October 2021, Yaroslavskyi's DCH group announced that its extensive industrial site would be redeveloped as Ukraine's largest technology park, "Ecoplis HTZ". HTZ would continue as an anchor tenant, to be joined by participants in an innovation hub, a logistics and e-commerce complex, a medical center, an agro-technological cluster, a shopping center and research labs.

The construction of what would have been the largest of the new tenants, the automated logistics sorting hub for the national postal operator Ukrposhta, was to have started in March 2022. A number of global hi-tech companies were committed to follow, including the global IT giant Hewlett Packard.

Ecopolis HTZ, was the central project of the Kharkiv Development Strategy and of President Volodymyr Zelenskyy's National Program "Ukrainian Silicon Valley". Yaroslavskyi was to help co-ordinate an investment of about $1 billion to create more than 10,000 new high-tech jobs.

=== Destroyed in Russian invasion, February 2022 ===
According to a February 28, 2022, report from Agroportal24h, the Kharkiv Tractor Plant was destroyed and "engulfed in fire" by "massive shelling" from Russian forces. There is video purporting to record explosions and fire at the plant on 25 and 27 February 2022.

On 22 March 2022, the Romanian news site Observator reported that KhTZ tractor production is to restart in Halboca, a village near the city of Jassy (Iași) in eastern Romania. KhTZ is moving salvaged equipment to Halboca where planning permission for the new plant is to be expedited.

== Products ==
Until the Russian invasion in February 2022, the Kharkiv Tractor Plant was producing machines designed to perform a variety of functions in many industries, agricultural and communal services, construction.

KhTZ manufactures wheeled (180–240 hp) and tracked tractors (190 hp) for agriculture.

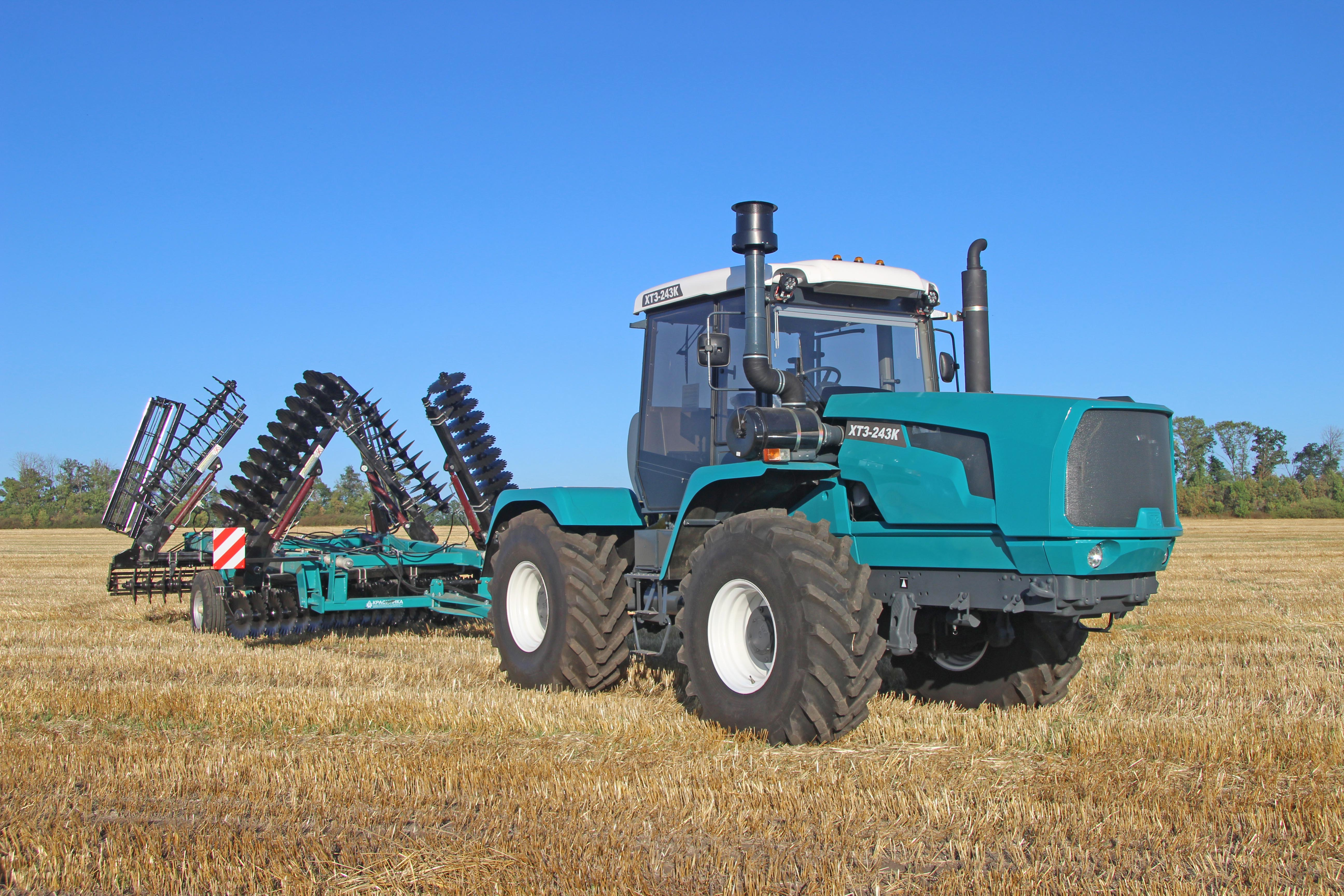
XTZ-243K

Wheeled tractors:

- XTZ-241K
- XTZ-242K
- XTZ-243K
- XTZ-248K
- XTZ-249K
- XTZ-150К-09.172.00
- XTZ-150К-09.172.10

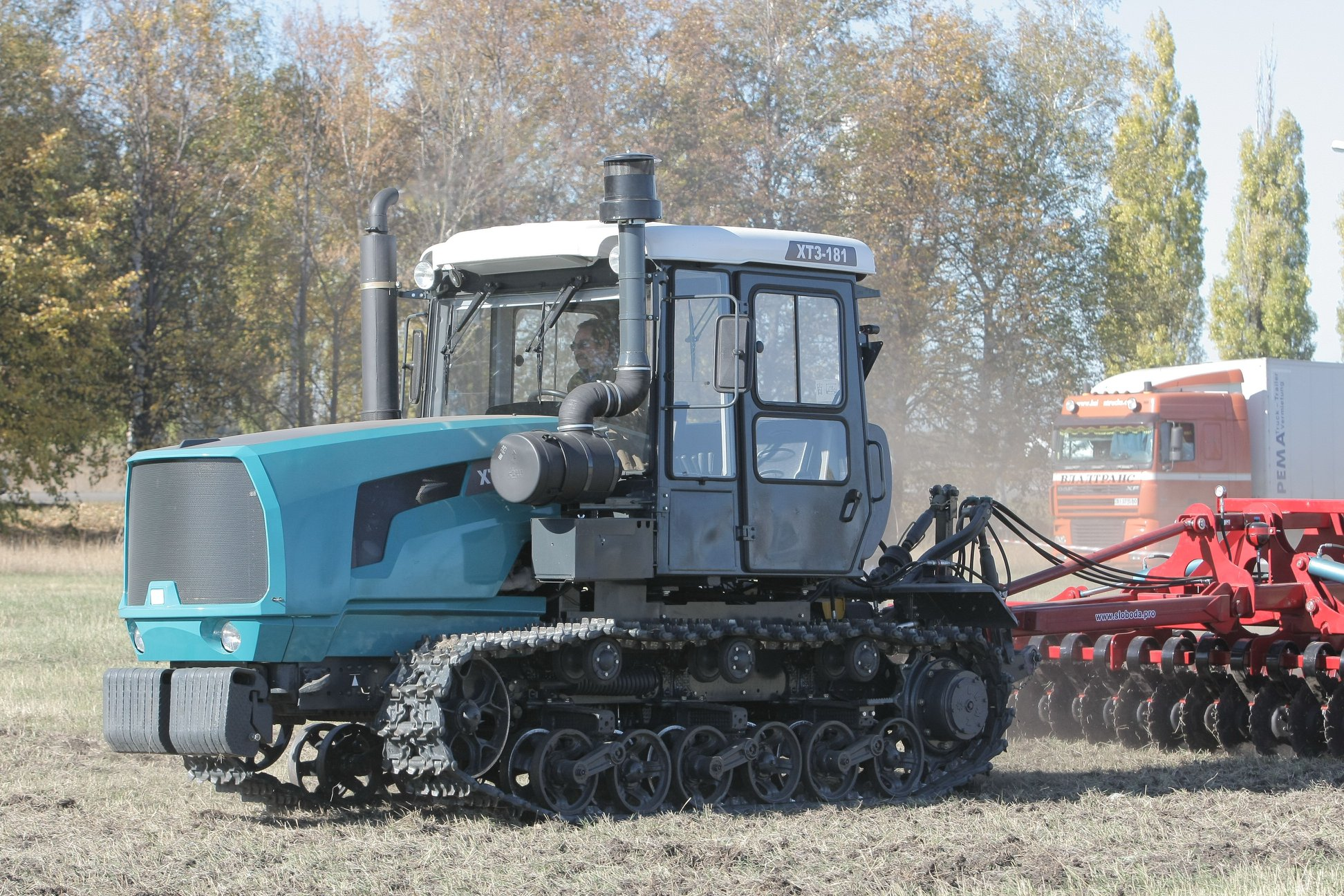
XTZ-181.20

Tracked tractors:

- ХТZ-181.20
- ХТZ-181.22

Special equipment:

- BKM-2M drilling and crane machine
- Mulcher
- ММТ-2, ММТ-2М
- Т-156B
- ММТ-2P

== Gallery ==
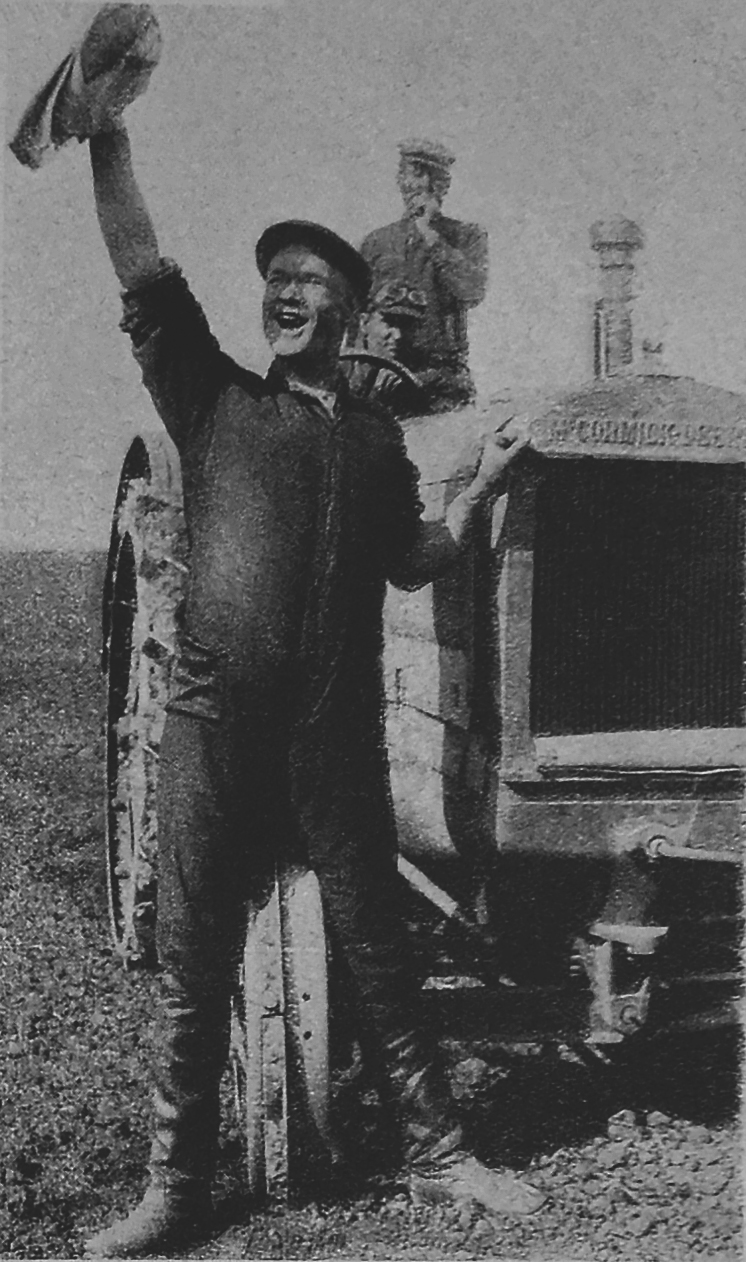
McCormick-Deering 15-30 (International Harvester), father of "KhTZ 15-30" 1931

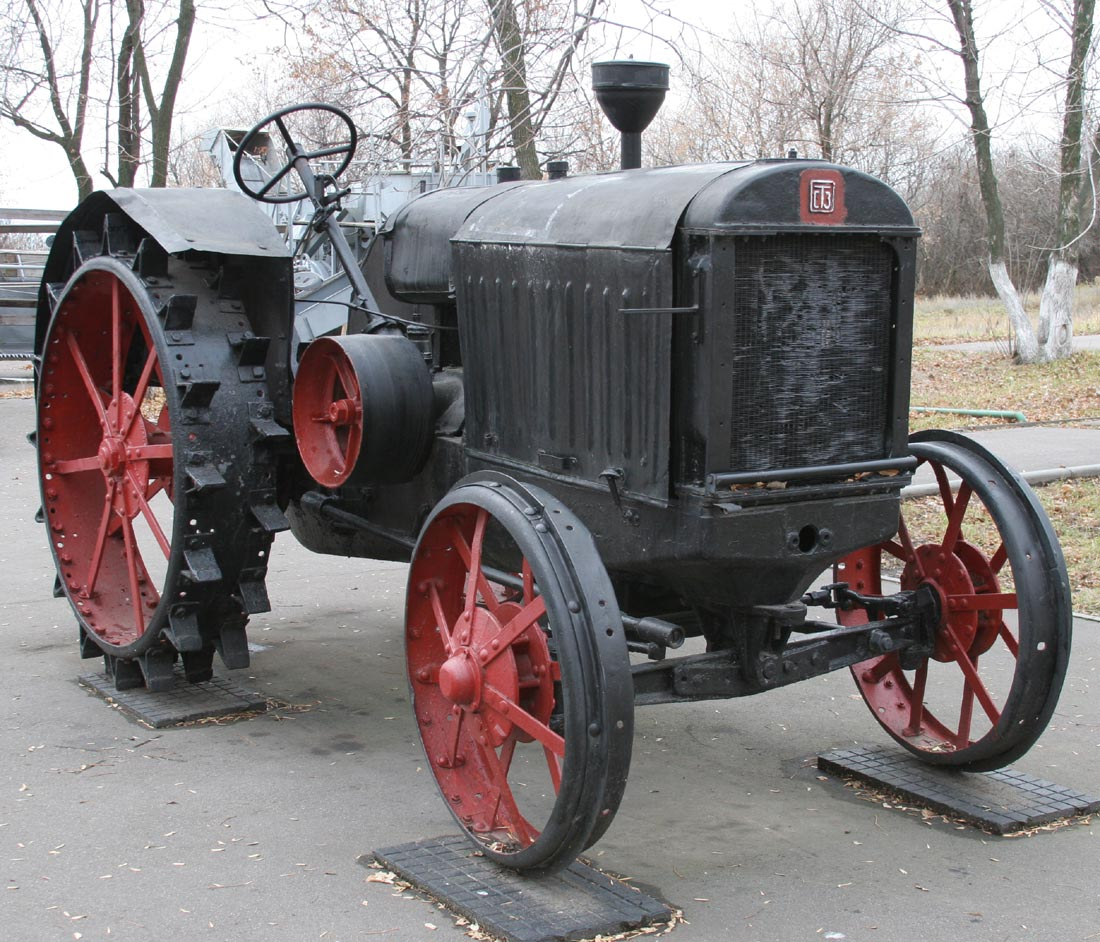
First serial SKhTZ 15–30

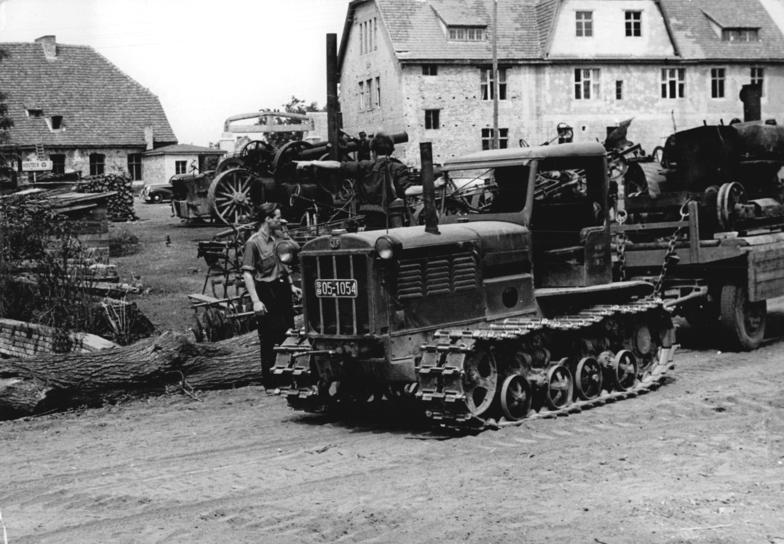
SKhTZ-NATI

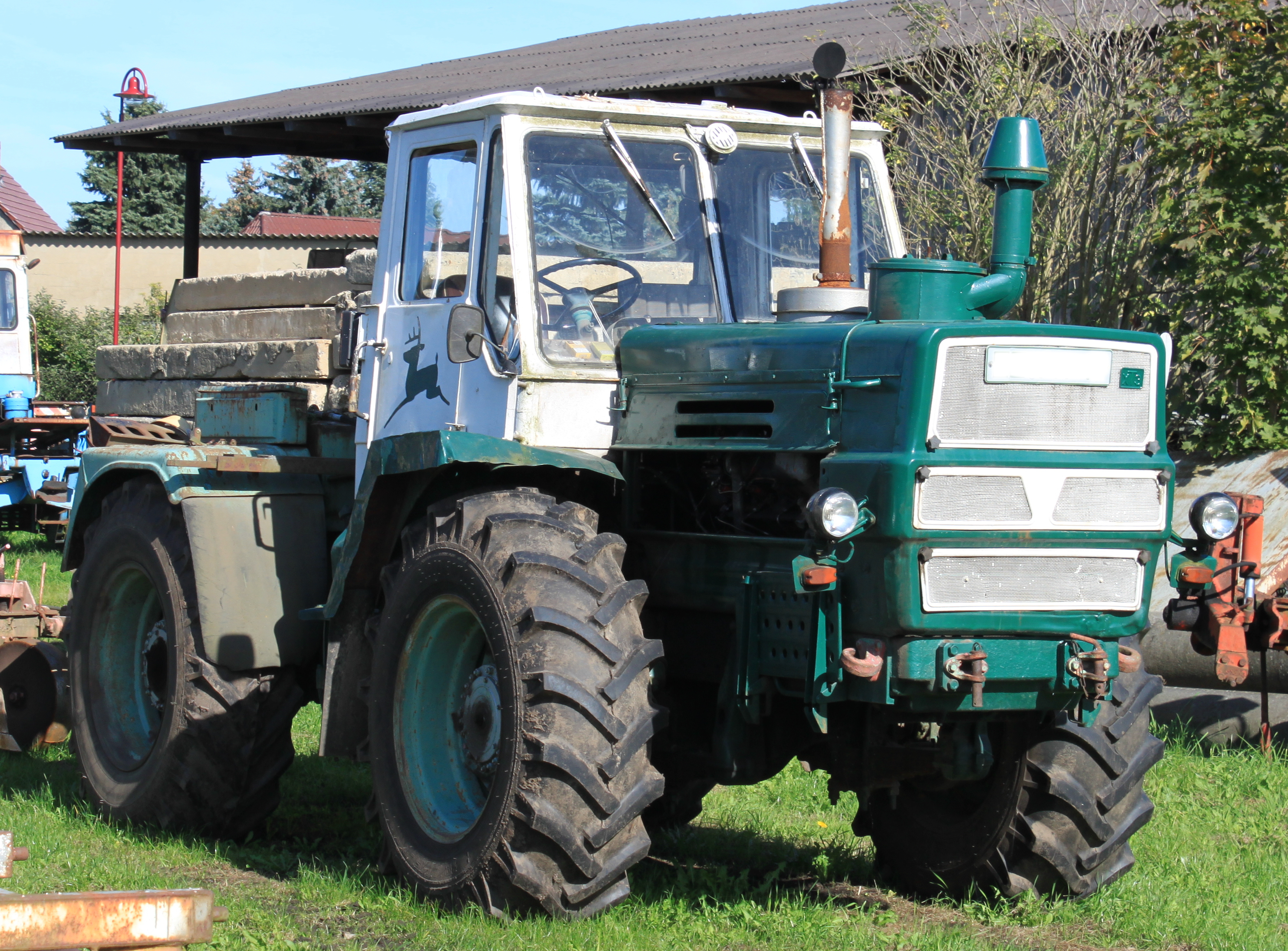
T-150K

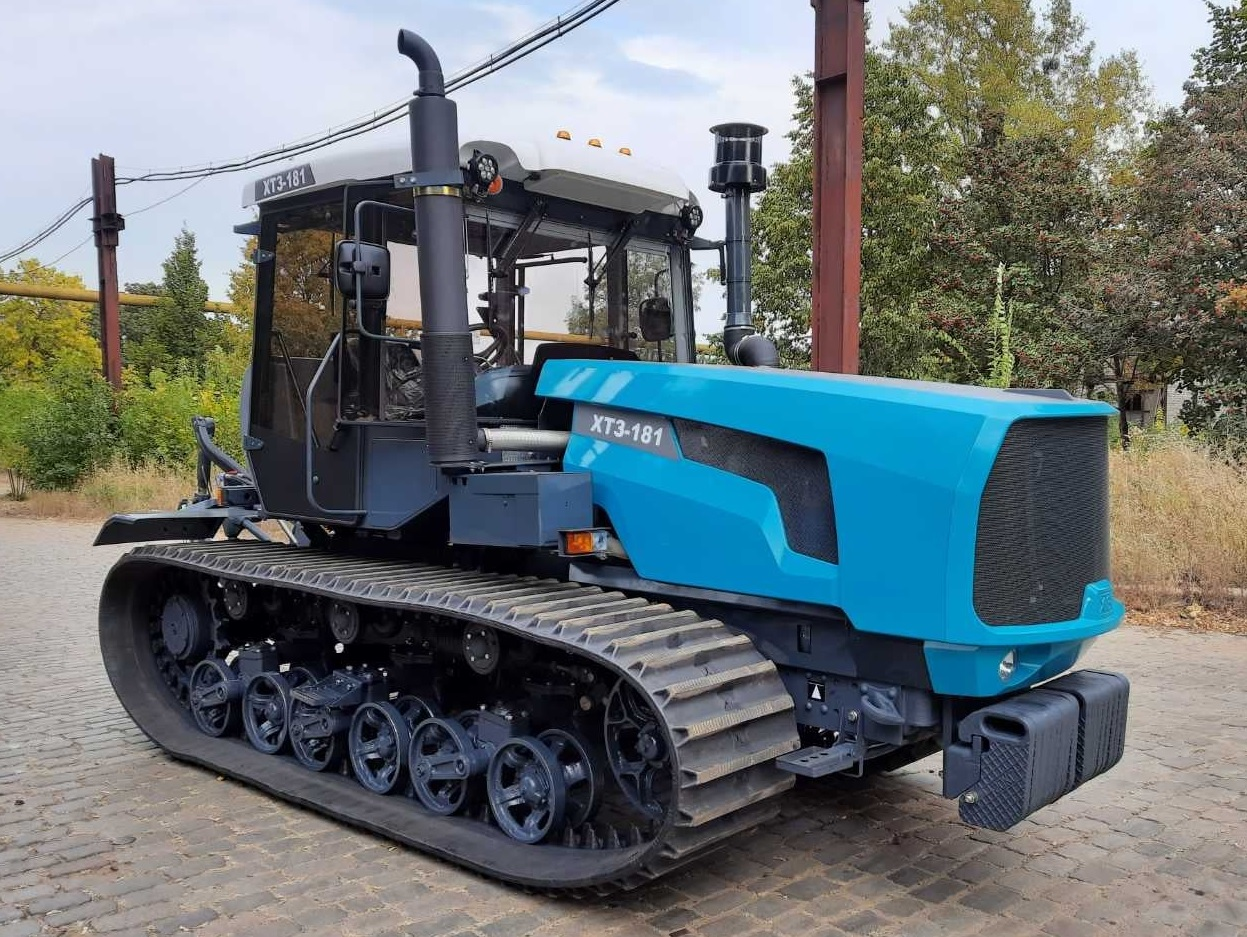
XTZ-181.22

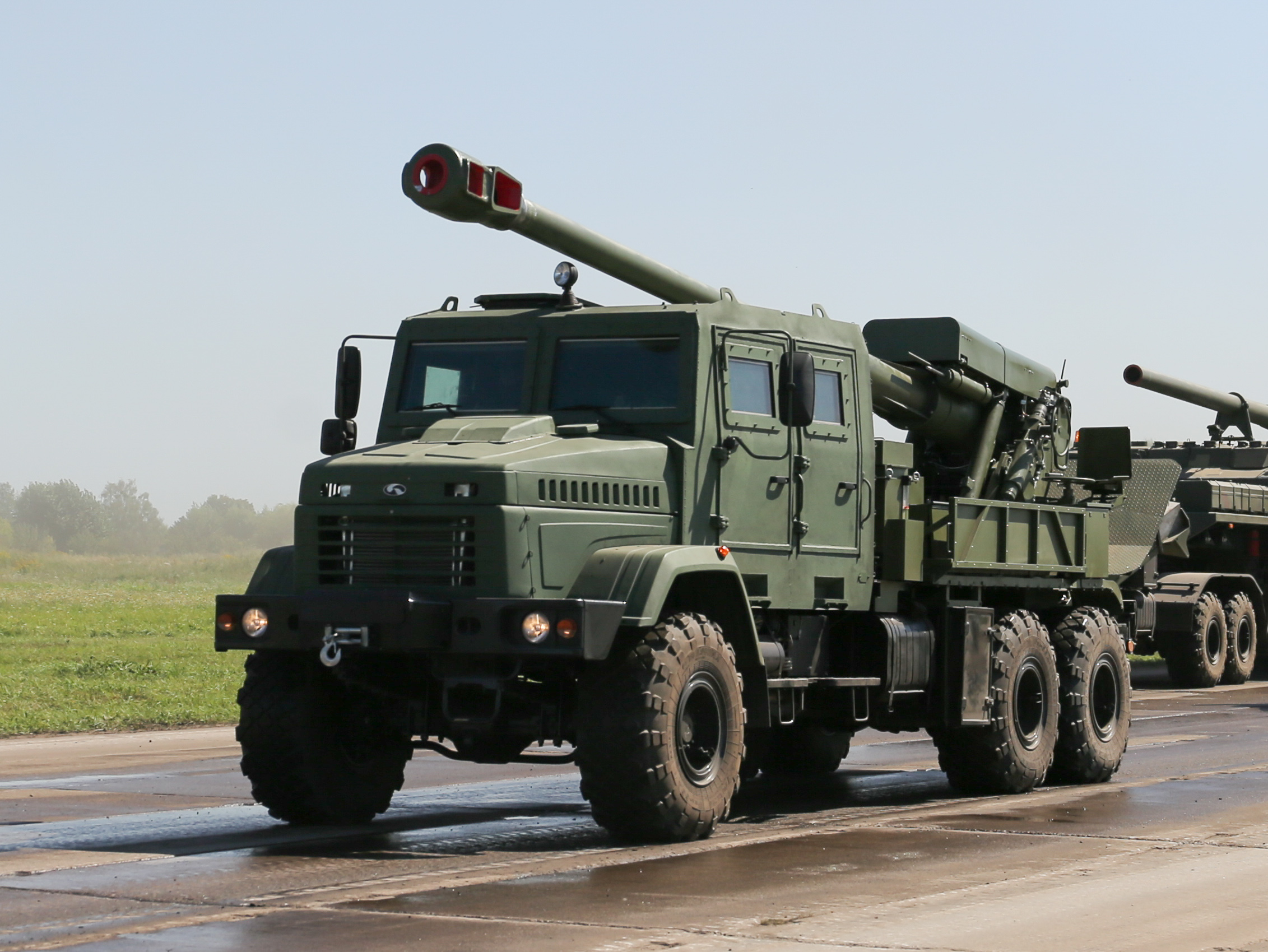
2S22 Bohdana Self-propelled Howitzer

== See also ==
- History of the Jews in Kharkiv
