= Khlibodarivka rural hromada =

Khlibodarivka rural hromada Хлібодарівська сільська громада
- Hromada
- Interactive map of Khlibodarivka rural hromada
- Country: Ukraine
- Oblast: Donetsk Oblast
- Raion: Volnovakha Raion

Area
  - Total: 662.2 km^{2} (255.7 sq mi)

Population (2020)
  - Total: 12,206
  - Density: 18.43/km^{2} (47.74/sq mi)
- Settlements: 27
- Rural settlements: 1
- Villages: 26

Khlibodarivka rural hromada (Ukrainian: Хлібодарівська сільська громада) is a hromada of Ukraine, located in Volnovakha Raion, Donetsk Oblast. Its administrative center is the village of Khlibodarivka.

It has an area of 662.2 square kilometres (255.7 mi^{2}) and a population of 12,206, as of 2020.

The hromada contains 27 settlements: 1 rural settlement (Zachativka) and 26 villages:

- Khlibodarivka
- Anadol
- Dianivka
- Holubytske
- Kalynove
- Kropyvnytske
- Lazarivka
- Lidyne
- Malynivka
- Novomykolaivka
- Novooleksiivka
- Peredove
- Petrivka
- Polkove
- Pryvilne
- Rivnopil
- Shevchenko
- Soniachne
- Stepne
- Stritenka
- Vesele
- Vilne
- Zachativka
- Zatyshne
- Zlatoustivka
- Znamenivka

== See also ==
- List of hromadas of Ukraine
