= Kulykivske, Donetsk Oblast =

Urban locality in Donetsk Oblast, Ukraine

Kulykivske Куликівське
- Rural settlement
- Location of Kulykivske within Donetsk Oblast#Location of Kulykivske within Ukraine Kulykivske (Ukraine)
- Coordinates: 48°6′35″N 38°32′27″E
- Country: Ukraine
- Oblast: Donetsk Oblast
- Raion: Donetsk Raion
- Hromada: Shakhtarsk urban hromada
- Elevation: 260 m (850 ft)

Population (2022)
  - Total: 624
- Time zone: UTC+2 (EET)
  - Summer (DST): UTC+3 (EEST)
- Postal code: 86240
- Area code: +380 6255

Kulykivske (Ukrainian: Куликівське), formerly known as Moskovske (Московське), is a rural settlement in Shakhtarsk urban hromada, Horlivka Raion, Donetsk Oblast, eastern Ukraine. Population: 624 (2022 estimate).

On 19 September 2024, the Verkhovna Rada voted to rename Moskovske to Kulykivske.

== Demographics ==
Native language as of the Ukrainian Census of 2001:

- Ukrainian 19.71%
- Russian 78.54%
- Belarusian 0.68%
