= Stizhkivske =

Urban locality in Donetsk Oblast, Ukraine

Stizhkivske Стіжківське
- Rural settlement
- Location of Stizhkivske within Donetsk Oblast Location of Stizhkivske within Ukraine
- Coordinates: 48°07′04″N 38°27′33″E
- Country: Ukraine
- Oblast: Donetsk Oblast
- Raion: Horlivka Raion
- Elevation: 264 m (866 ft)

Population (2022)
  - Total: 3,876
- Time zone: UTC+2 (EET)
  - Summer (DST): UTC+3 (EEST)
- Postal code: 86233
- Area code: +380 6255

Stizhkivske (Ukrainian: Стіжківське) is a rural settlement in Shakhtarsk urban hromada, Horlivka Raion, Donetsk Oblast, eastern Ukraine. Population: 3,876 (2022 estimate).

== Demographics ==
Native language as of the Ukrainian Census of 2001:

- Ukrainian 31.67%
- Russian 67.39%
- Belarusian 0.34%
- Armenian 0.11%
- Greek 0.02%
