= Khlibodarivka, Donetsk Oblast =

Khlibodarivka Хлібодарівка
- Village
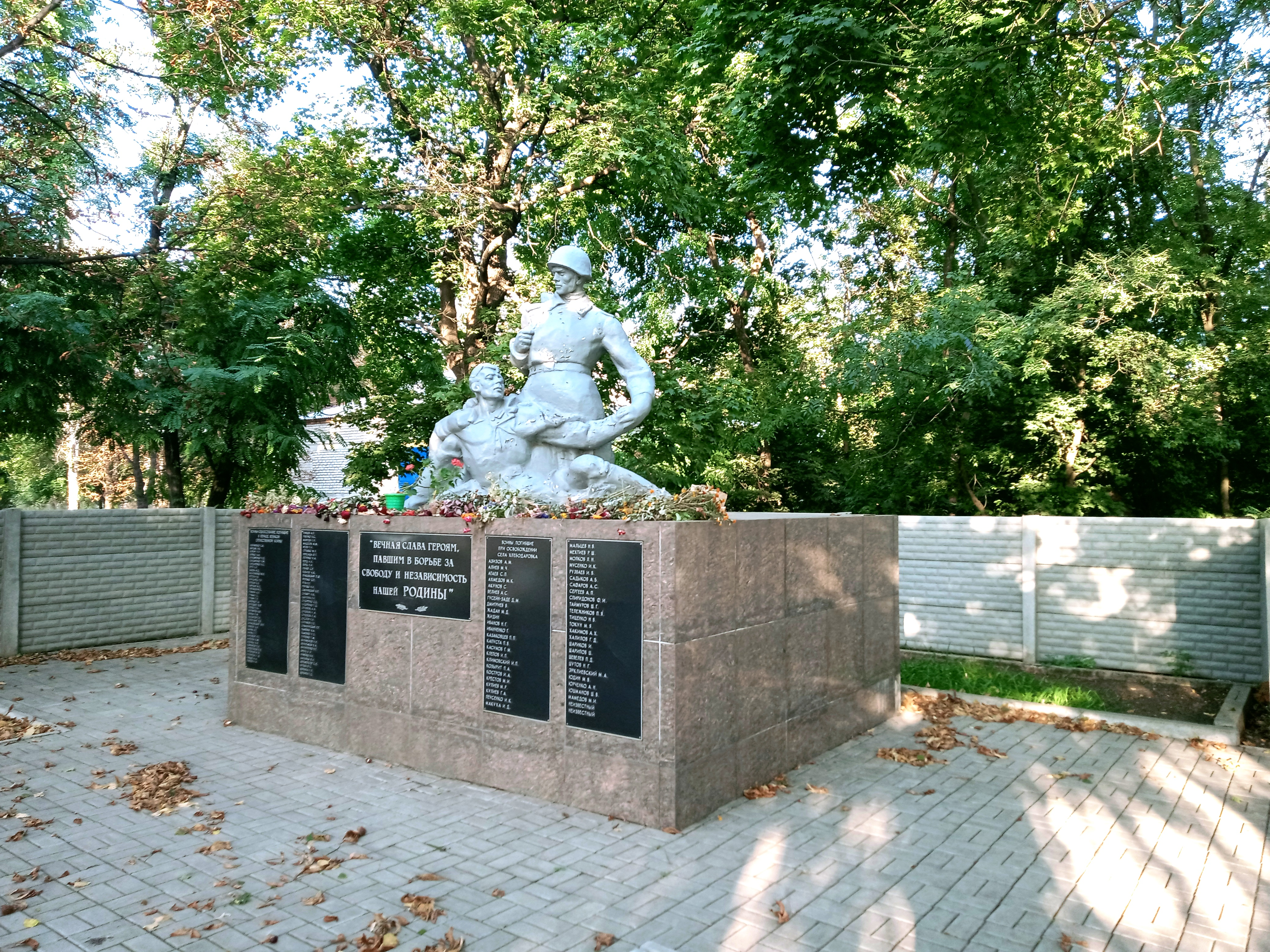
- World War II memorial in Khlibodarivka

- Location within Donetsk Oblast Location within Ukraine
- Coordinates: 47°28′51″N 37°23′41″E
- Country: Ukraine
- Oblast: Donetsk Oblast
- Raion: Volnovakha Raion
- Hromada: Khlibodarivka rural hromada
- Founded: 1858

Area
  - Total: 1.78 km^{2} (0.69 sq mi)
- Elevation: 216 m (709 ft)

Population (2001 census)
  - Total: 1,296
  - Density: 728/km^{2} (1,890/sq mi)
- Time zone: UTC+2 (EET)
  - Summer (DST): UTC+3 (EEST)
- Postal code: 85766
- Area code: +3806244
- KOATUU code: 1421588001

Khlibodarivka (Ukrainian: Хлібодарівка; Russian: Хлебодаровка) is a village in the Volnovakha Raion of Donetsk Oblast, Ukraine.

== Demographics ==
As of the 2001 Ukrainian census, the town had a population of 1,296 inhabitants. The linguistic composition of the settlement was as follows:

Native languages in Khlibodarivka
| | percent |
| Ukrainian | 69.2% |
| Russian | 30.2% |
| Armenian | 0.5% |
| others | 0.1% |

== Notable people from Khlibodarivka ==
- Vitaliy Haiduk (born 1957), Ukrainian businessman and politician
