= Shakhtarsk =

City in Donetsk Oblast, Ukraine

Shakhtarsk Шахтарськ Шахтёрск
- City
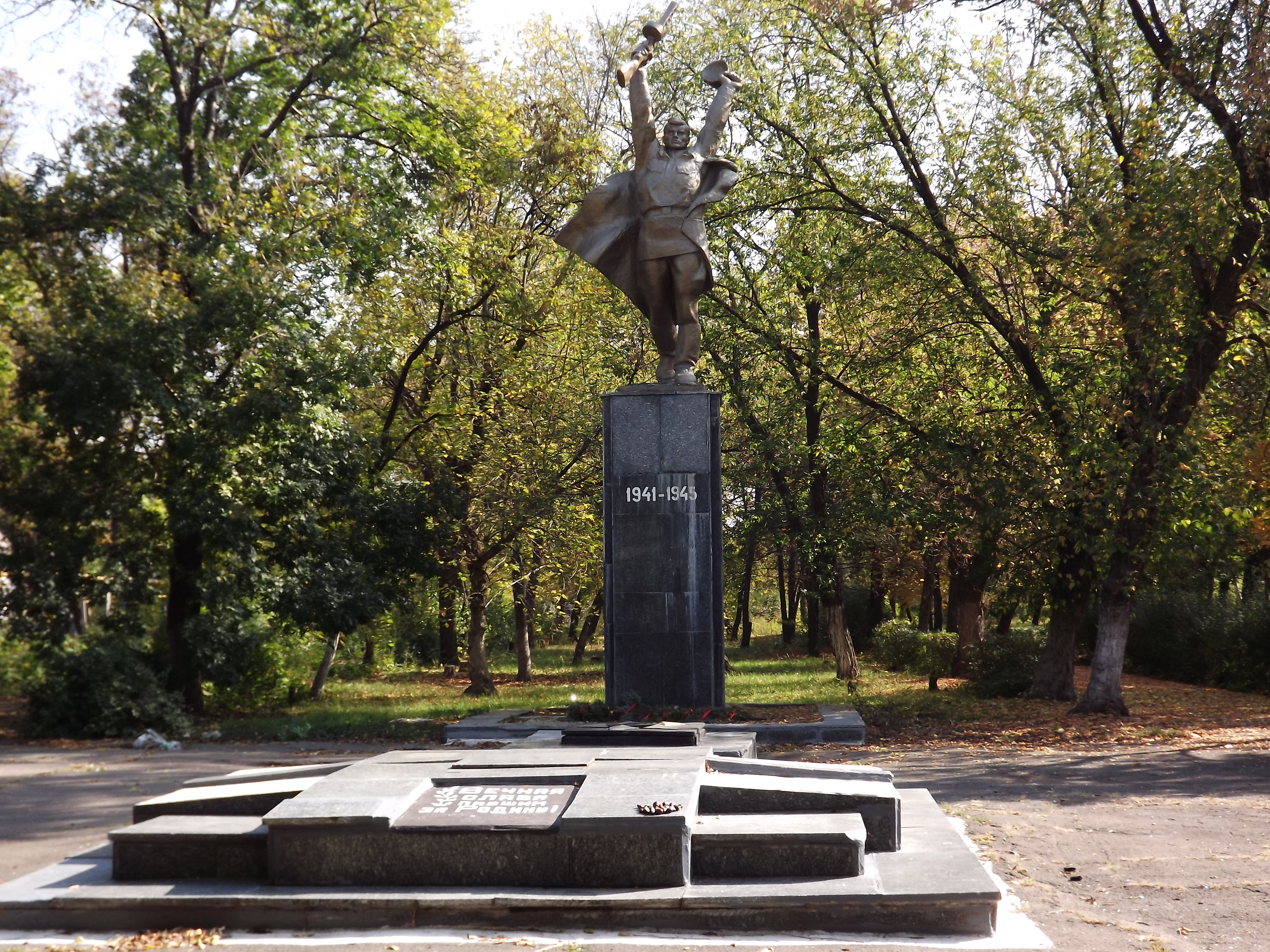
- A WWII monument in the city

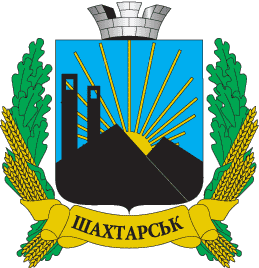
- Flag Seal
- Interactive map of Shakhtarsk
- Location within Donetsk Oblast Location within Ukraine
- Coordinates: 48°02′49″N 38°28′7″E
- Country: Ukraine
- Oblast: Donetsk Oblast
- Raion: Horlivka Raion
- Hromada: Shakhtarsk urban hromada
- Founded: 1953
- Incorporated: 1953

Area
  - Total: 51 km^{2} (20 sq mi)

Population (2022)
  - Total: 48,208
- Climate: Dfb
- Website: official site

Shakhtarsk (Ukrainian: Шахтарськ, IPA: [ʃɐxˈtɑrsʲk]) or Shakhtyorsk (Russian: Шахтёрск) is a city in Horlivka Raion, Donetsk Oblast, eastern Ukraine, currently occupied by Russia. Regionally, the city is the administrative center of the Shakhtarsk urban hromada. Population: 48,208 (2022 estimate).

== History ==
Urban-type settlement since 1938.

A local newspaper is published here since May 1946.

In August 1953 the urban-type settlement Katyk became a city Shakhtyorsk. Ukrainian: Шахтар is a coal miner. (The word comes from German: Schacht, which means shaft.)

In 1964, a trade college was opened here.

In 1985, the population of the city was 72 thousand people, the basis of the economy was coal mining.

In 1989, the population of the city was 73 854 people, the basis of the economy were coal mining, manufacture of clothes and knitwear.

Since Soviet times until 1997, there were four vocational schools (№ 70, № 71, № 97 and № 98) and one college (a college of commerce and trade); in May 1997, the vocational school № 71 was closed.

In 2000, a textile factory went bankrupt. After the beginning of the economic crisis in 2008, the mechanical-repair plant became bankrupt and was closed.

In 2013, the population was 51 007 people.

Starting mid-April 2014, the self-proclaimed Donetsk People's Republic occupied towns in Donetsk Oblast; including Shakhtarsk. On 27 July 2014, Ukrainian forces and pro-Russian local militia claimed Ukrainian troops had entered Shakhtarsk. On 30 July 2014, the DPR militia resumed control of the city.

== Demographics ==
According to the 2001 Ukrainian Census:

Ethnicity		
Ukrainians	41,951	57.7%
Russians	27,412	37.7%
Belarusians	1,080	1.5%
Tatars	689	0.9%
Moldovans	189	0.3%

Native language	
Russian	76.44%
Ukrainian	22.35%
Belarusian	0.13%
Armenian	0.07%
Moldovan (Romanian)	0.03%
Romani	0.01%

== Gallery ==
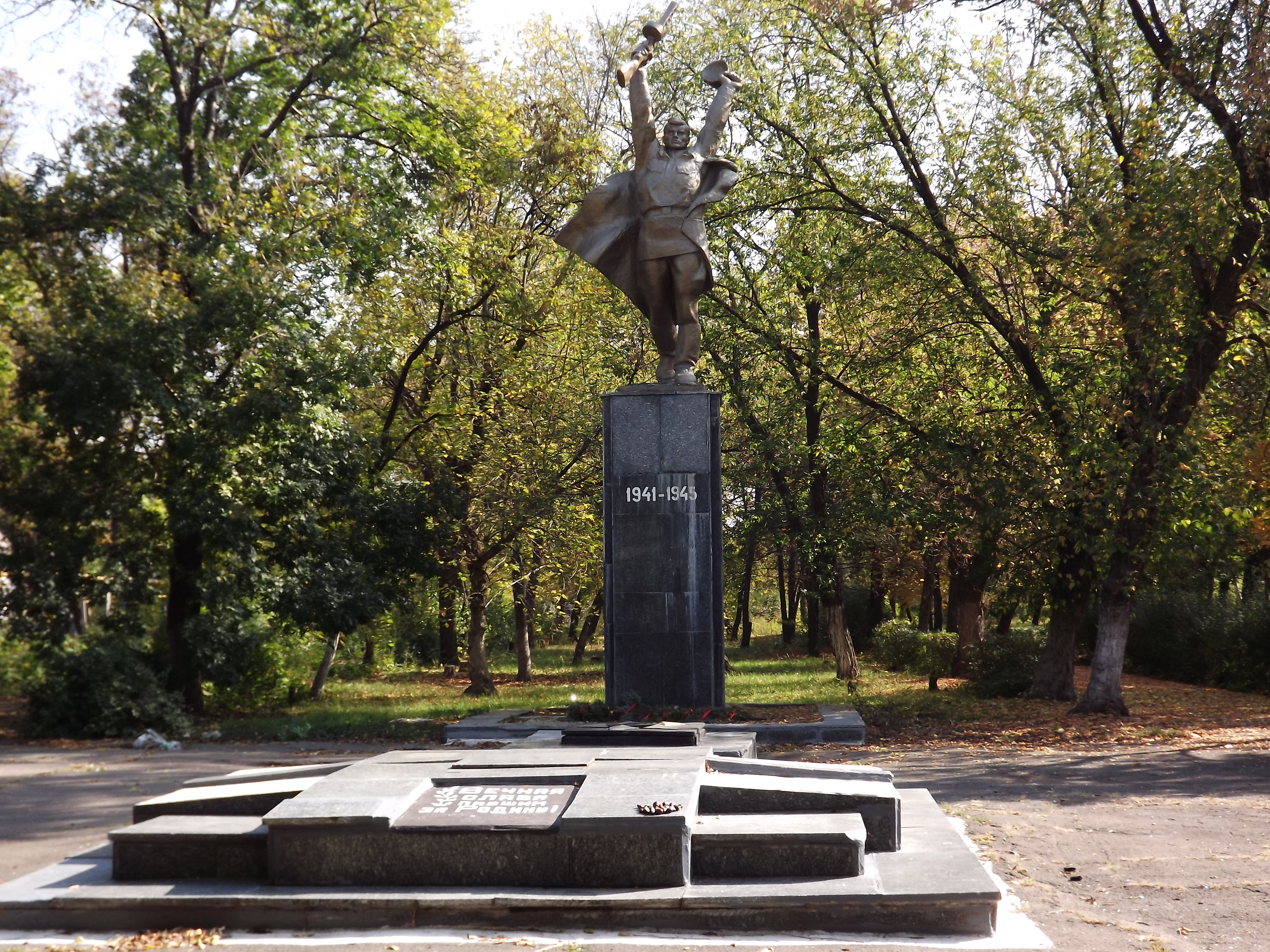
Mass grave of Soviet soldiers in Shakhtarsk

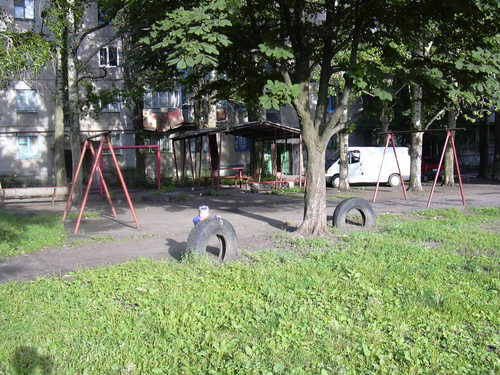
Shakhtarsk yard
