= Zatyshne, Donetsk Oblast =

Zatyshne Затишне
- Village
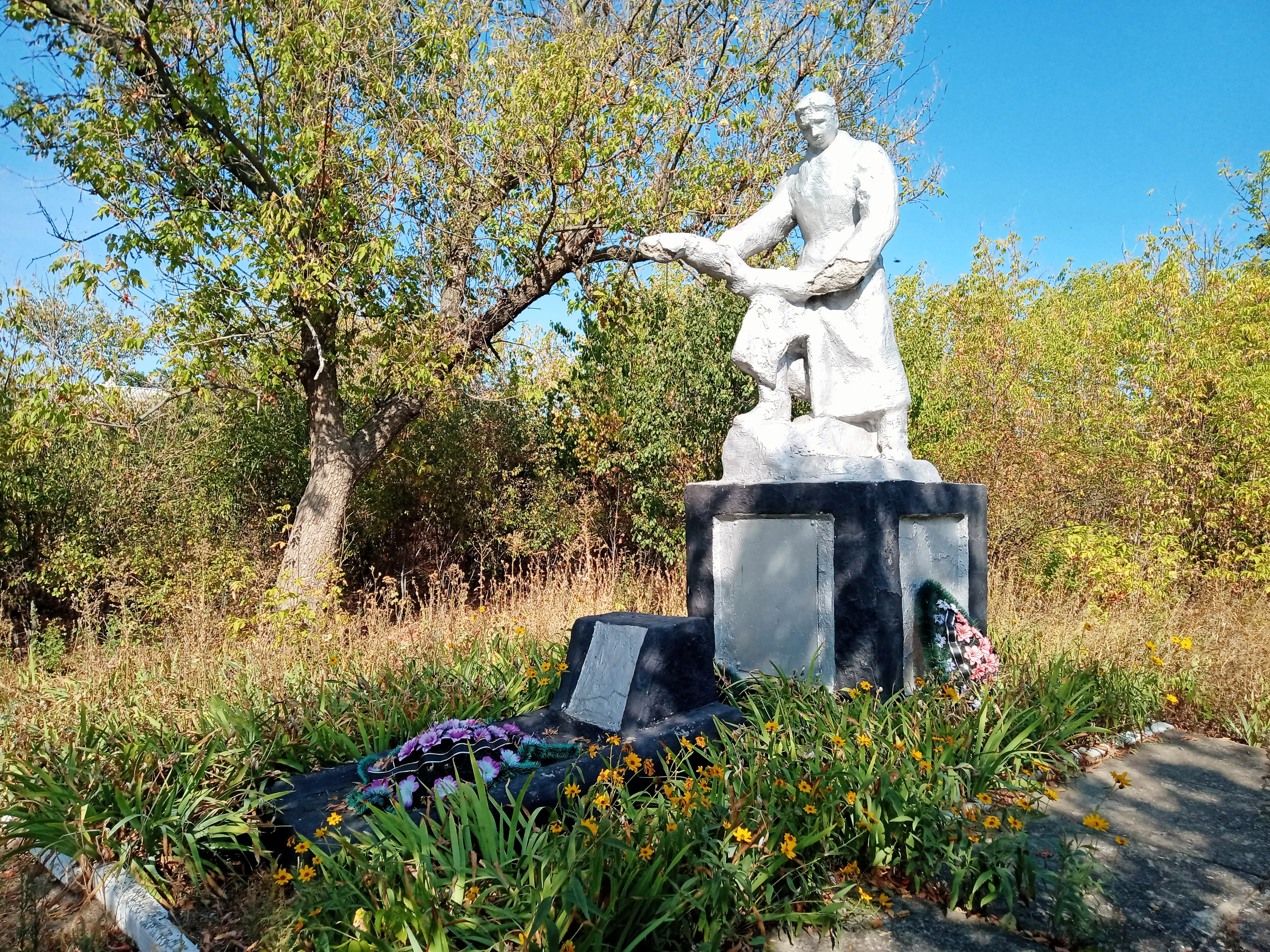

- Location of Zatyshne Zatyshne (Ukraine)
- Coordinates: 47°31′15″N 37°19′37″E
- Country: Ukraine
- Oblast: Donetsk Oblast
- Raion: Volnovakha Raion
- Hromada: Khlibodarivka rural hromada
- Elevation: 177 m (581 ft)

Population (2001)
  - Total: 201
- Time zone: UTC+2 (EET)
  - Summer (DST): UTC+3 (EEST)
- Postal code: 85765
- Area code: +380 6244
- Climate: Dfa

Zatyshne (Ukrainian: Затишне) is a village in the Volnovakha Raion (district) of Donetsk Oblast in eastern Ukraine.

== Demographics ==
Native language as of the Ukrainian Census of 2001:

- Ukrainian: 54.23%
- Russian: 45.77%
