= Shakhtarsk urban hromada =

Shakhtarsk urban hromada Шахтарська міська громада
- Hromada
- Interactive map of Shakhtarsk urban hromada
- Country: Ukraine
- Oblast: Donetsk
- Raion: Horlivka
- Settlements: 22
- Cities: 1
- Rural settlements: 14
- Villages: 3
- Towns: 4

Shakhtarsk urban hromada (Ukrainian: Шахтарська міська громада) is a hromada of Ukraine, located in Horlivka Raion, Donetsk Oblast. Its administrative center is the city Shakhtarsk.

The hromada contains 22 settlements: 1 city (Shakhtarsk), 4 urban-type settlements (Kontarne, Moskovske, Serdyte, and Stizhkivske), 3 villages (Velyka Shyshivka, Ternove, and Shaposhnykove), and 14 rural-type settlements:

- Viktoriya
- Vinnytske
- Hirne
- Dorofiyenko
- Dubove
- Zarichne
- Zaroshchenske
- Zakharchenko
- Zachativka
- Kyshchenko
- Lobanivka
- Molodetske
- Sadove
- Chumaky

== See also ==
- List of hromadas of Ukraine
