= Petrivka, Volnovakha Raion, Donetsk Oblast =

Petrivka Петрівка
- Village
- Location of Petrivka within Ukraine Petrivka (Ukraine)
- Coordinates: 47.479722°N 37.441667°E
- Country: Ukraine
- Oblast: Donetsk Oblast
- Raion: Volnovakha Raion
- Hromada: Khlibodarivka rural hromada

Area
  - Total: 0.15 km^{2} (0.058 sq mi)
- Elevation: 193 m (633 ft)

Population (2001 census)
  - Total: 19
  - Density: 130/km^{2} (330/sq mi)
- Time zone: UTC+2 (EET)
  - Summer (DST): UTC+3 (EEST)
- Postal code: 85710
- Area code: +380 6244

Petrivka (Ukrainian: Петрівка; Russian: Петровка, romanized: Petrovka), known as Petrivske (Ukrainian: Петрівське; Russian: Петровское, romanized: Petrovskoye) before 2016, is a village in Volnovakha Raion (district) in Donetsk Oblast of eastern Ukraine, at 71.7 kilometres (44.6 mi) SSW from the centre of Donetsk city.

== History ==
The village was founded in the late 18th century by migrants from Kharkov Governorate.

Petrivske was taken under control of pro-Russian forces during the War in Donbas, that started in 2014. It was renamed to Petrivka in 2016 as part of decommunization in Ukraine.

== Demographics ==
The settlement had 19 inhabitants in 2001; native language distribution as of the 2001 Ukrainian census:

- Ukrainian: 15.79%
- Russian: 84.21%
