= Zachativka, Horlivka Raion, Donetsk Oblast =

Coordinates: 48°01′50″N 38°22′40″E

Zachativka (Ukrainian: Зача́тівка) is a rural settlement in Shakhtarsk urban hromada, Horlivka Raion, Donetsk Oblast, Ukraine.

According to the 2001 Ukrainian census, the settlement had a population of 568, of whom natively 26.58% spoke Ukrainian, 72.18% spoke Russian, 0.53% spoke Moldovan (Romanian) and 0.18% spoke Greek.
