= Zachativka (rural settlement), Volnovakha Raion, Donetsk Oblast =

Settlement in Donetsk Oblast, Ukraine

Coordinates: 47°28′23″N 37°12′06″E

Zachativka (Ukrainian: Зачатівка) is a rural settlement in Ukraine, located in Khlibodarivka rural hromada, Volnovakha Raion, Donetsk Oblast.

In the 2001 Ukrainian census, the settlement was found to have a population of 668, of whom 74.25% spoke Ukrainian, 25.6% spoke Russian, and 0.15% spoke Greek (including Mariupol Greek and Urum).
