= Alchevsk Metallurgical Complex =

Steel company of Ukraine

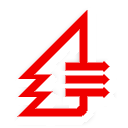
- Native name: Алчевський металургійний комбінат
- Type: Public company, Open joint-stock company
- Industry: Ferrous metallurgy
- Founded: 1895
- Founder: Oleksiy Kyrylovych Alchevsky, Petro Arsentiyovych Hmyria, Anatolii Vasyliovych Zherdev, Hryhoriy Savych Yakymenko, Taras Hryhorovych Shevchenko
- Headquarters: Luhansk Oblast Alchevsk Shmidta Street 4, Ukraine
- Key people: Valery Sherin (CEO)
- Products: Cast iron, Steel, Rolled
- Number of employees: 13,447 (2014)
- Parent: Southern Mining and Metallurgical Complex LLC (YUGMK)
- Subsidiaries: Alchevsk Coke-Chemical Plant (since 2022)

Alchevsk Metallurgical Complex (Ukrainian: Алчевський металургійний комбінат, romanized: Alchevskyi metalurhiynyi kombinat) is one of the oldest ferrous metallurgy enterprises in eastern Ukraine. Its history dates back to the 1890s, and its founder is Oleksiy Kyrylovych Alchevsky.

It was founded in 1895 as a metallurgical plant of the Donetsko-Yurievske Metallurgical Company.

In 1961-1991 it was called the Kommunarsk Metallurgical Plant, because at that time the city of Alchevsk was called Kommunarsk.

== History ==
From the beginning of the 1890s, on the initiative and financial participation of Oleksiy Alchevsky, two powerful metallurgical enterprises were formed: the Donetsko-Yurievske Metallurgical Company (now the Alchevsk Metallurgical Complex), designed and built by A. Mevius, and together with the Belgians the Russian Providence Company (now Mariupol Metallurgical Plant named after Ilyich).

In 1895, the Metallurgical Plant of Donetsko-Yurievske Metallurgical Company was founded near the Yurievka station (now Kommunarsk) of the Luhansk-Debaltseve railway. The first blast furnace was blown in May 1896. In 1900, the plant employed 3,200 workers.

In 1915, the plant had 5 blast furnaces, 7 open-hearth furnaces, and rolling mills.

The 90's were a rough time for AMC. Beginning in 1997 it underwent bankruptcy proceedings. Until recently, the plant was jointly managed by Interpipe Group and the Industrial Union of Donbas. In 2002, AMC came under the full management of the ISD.

Alchevsk Metallurgical Complex supplies its products to more than 60 countries.

=== Russian occupation (2014–present) ===
Due to the war in eastern Ukraine, in the spring of 2015, the complex ceased its activities as Alchevsk was seized by Russian-backed separatists of the LNR.

In December 2017, blast furnace № 5 was launched, the company has started operating as a branch of the Russian ZAO Vneshtorgservis. Finished goods are sold through the Russian company Gas Alliance (or Gaz-Alyans), an intermediary between Vneshtorgservice and end users. Since June 2021, the UGMK group (Southern Mining and Metallurgical Complex) has taken over the management of the metallurgical enterprise AMK. By 2025, plant increased its production volume to two million tons of steel per year.

== Ecology ==
As of 22 February 2011, the Alchevsk Metallurgical Complex was one of the ten facilities that are the largest polluters in Ukraine.

== Gallery ==
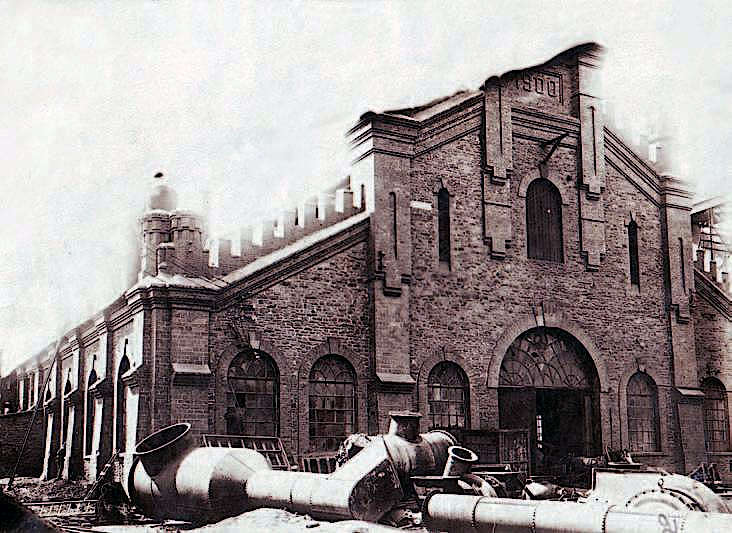
Iron foundry DYMC (1900)

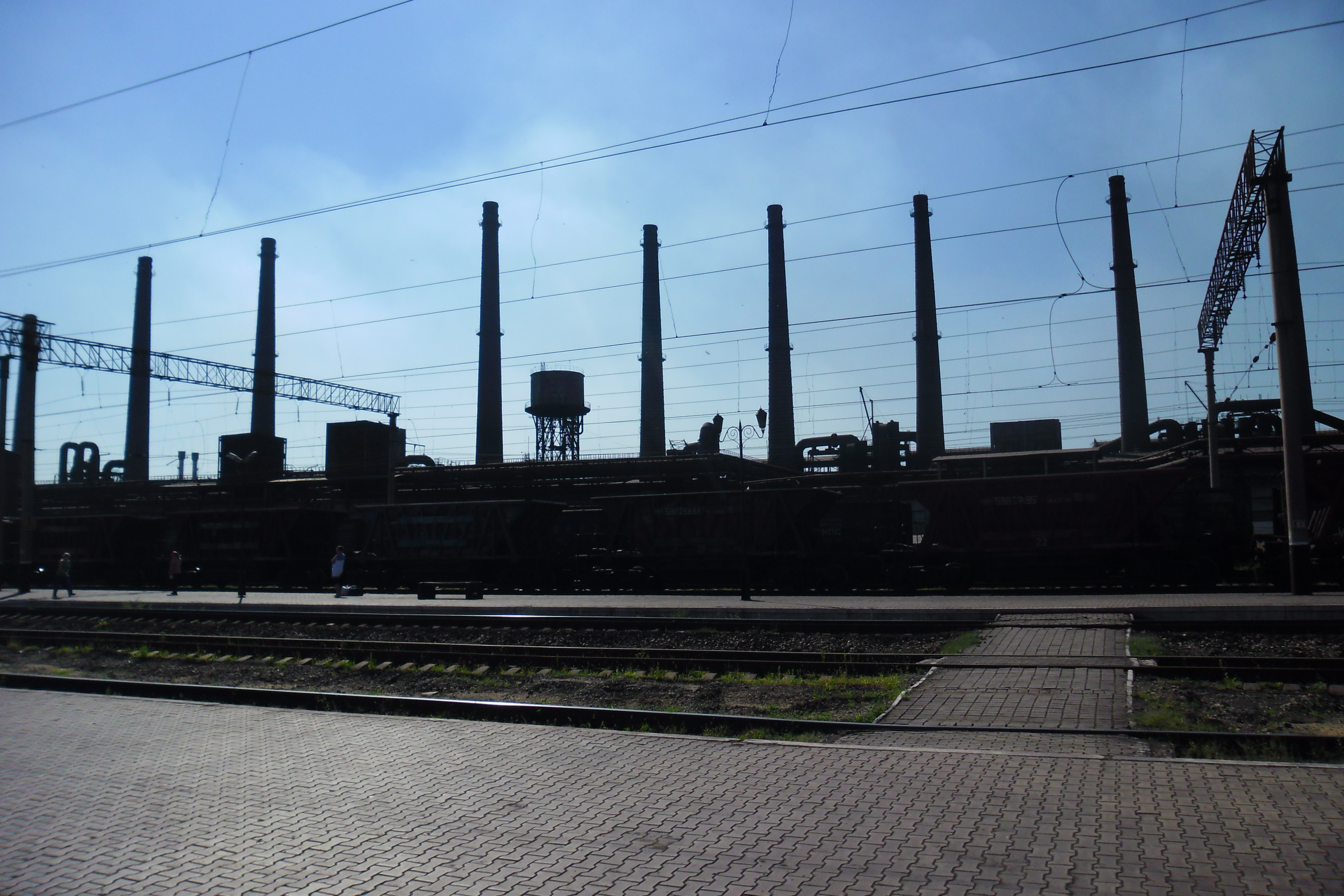
Alchevsk Metallurgical Complex

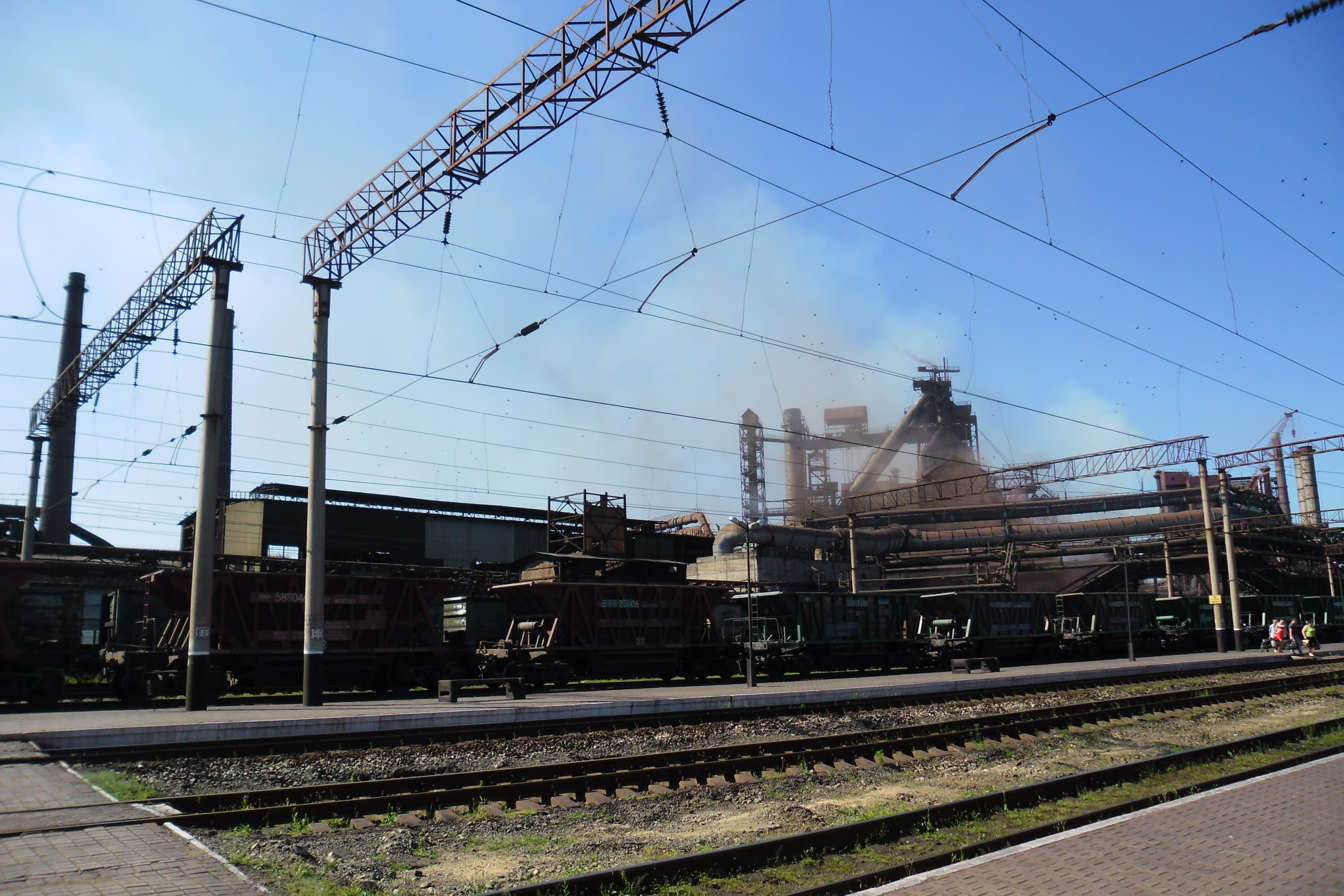
AMC
