= Rivnopil, Khlibodarivka rural hromada, Volnovakha Raion, Donetsk Oblast =

Village in Donetsk Oblast, Ukraine

Rivnopil Рівнопіль
- Village
- Interactive map of Rivnopil
- Location of Rivnopil within Ukraine Rivnopil (Ukraine)
- Coordinates: 47.558611°N 37.2325°E
- Country Country: Ukraine
- Oblast Region: Donetsk Oblast
- Raion: Volnovakha Raion
- Hromada: Khlibodarivka
- Founded: Middle of the 19th century

Area
  - Total: 1.68 km^{2} (0.65 sq mi)
- Elevation: 184 m (604 ft)

Population (2001 census)
  - Total: 1,423
  - Density: 847/km^{2} (2,190/sq mi)
- Time zone: UTC+2 (EET)
  - Summer (DST): UTC+3 (EEST)
- Postal code: 85760
- Area code: +380 6244

Rivnopil (Ukrainian: Рівнопіль; Russian: Ровнополь) is a village in Volnovakha Raion (district) in Donetsk Oblast of eastern Ukraine, at about 66.44 kilometres (41.28 mi) southwest (SW) from the centre of Donetsk city. It belongs to Khlibodarivka rural hromada, one of the hromadas of Ukraine.

The village was taken under control by Russian forces in March 2022.

== Demographics ==
In 2001 the settlement had 1,423 inhabitants. Native language as of the Ukrainian Census of 2001:

- Ukrainian – 82.83%
- Russian – 16.47%
- Belarusian – 0.35%
- Greek – 0.21%
- Armenian and Gagauz – 0.07%
