= Vitaliy Haiduk =

- Віталій Гайдук

Secretary of the National Security and Defense Council of Ukraine
- In office 10 October 2006 – 12 May 2007
- Preceded by: Anatoliy Kinakh
- Succeeded by: Ivan Plyushch

Minister of Fuel and Energy of Ukraine
- In office 22 November 2001 – 26 November 2002
- Preceded by: Serhiy Yermilov
- Succeeded by: Serhiy Yermilov

Deputy Prime Minister of Ukraine
- In office 26 November 2002 – 5 December 2003

Personal details
- Born: Khlibodarivka, Volnovakha Raion, Donetsk Oblast, Ukrainian SSR, Soviet Union (now Ukraine)
- Education: Donetsk Polytechnic Institute
- Occupation: businessman, politician
- Known for: co-founder of Industrial Union of Donbas
- Awards: Order of Merit (Ukraine)

Vitaliy Haiduk (born 19 July 1957) is a Ukrainian businessman and politician. One of the founders of the corporation Industrial Union of Donbas. PhD. From 10 October 2006 to 12 May 2007 Secretary of the National Security and Defense Council of Ukraine. One of the richest Ukrainians, his estimated net worth is $2.7 billion.

== Biography ==
Haiduk was born in the village Khlibodarivka, Volnovakha Raion, Donetsk Oblast. He is married and has a son and a daughter.

Education: Donetsk Polytechnic Institute (1980), engineer-economist, "Economics and Organization of the engineering industry", PhD thesis "Organizational — economic mechanism of leasing" (National Academy of Sciences Institute of Industrial Economics, 2001).

From 1980 — engineer, Donetsk Polytechnic Institute.

1981–1988 — Senior Economist, Head of Economics and Labour, Deputy Director of Economics, Donetsk Regional Center "AvtoVAZtehobsluhovuvannya".

1988–1994 — Director, Zuyevskaya electromechanical plant.

November 1994 — Deputy Chairman of Donetsk Regional Council.

November 1995 — July 1996 — Deputy Chairman of issues of industry, transport and communication, June — September 1997 — 1st Deputy Chairman of Donetsk Regional State Administration. In May 1997, the governor of the region was Viktor Yanukovych.

In January 2000 — April 2001 — Haiduk is 1st Deputy Minister, Ministry of Fuel and Energy of Ukraine.

2001 — 1st Deputy Head of the Central Office, the Party of Regions.

22 November 2001 — 26 November 2002 — Minister of Fuel and Energy of Ukraine.

26 November 2002 — 5 December 2003 — Deputy Prime Minister of Ukraine.

May 2004 — December 2006 — Chairman of the Supervisory Board of JSC "Dnieper Metallurgical Works named after Dzerzhinsky", President, Consortium "Industrial Group" (Kyiv).

He was a member of the Political Executive Committee of the Party of Regions.

== Proceedings and awards ==
Akademik of National Academy of Economic Sciences of Ukraine. "Honored Power Engineer CIS". Signs of "Miner's Glory" III, II Class. Diploma of the Cabinet of Ministers of Ukraine (2004). Order of Merit (2005). A civil servant rank 1 (January 2007).

Co-author of the book "Problems and prospects of development of leasing in Ukraine" (2000).
