= Industrial Union of Donbas =

Industrial Union of Donbas ISD
- Type: Holding
- Industry: major: metallurgy minor: agriculture
- Founded: 1995 in Donetsk, Ukraine
- Founder: Vitaliy Haiduk, Serhiy Taruta, Oleh Mkrtchian
- Headquarters: Donetsk, Donets Oblast, Ukraine
- Number of locations: Ukraine, Poland, Hungary
- Key people: Serhiy Taruta, Oleh Mkrtchan
- Owner: ISD (49.9%), Carbofer Group (50%+2)
- Website: www.isd.com.ua/en/

Industrial Union of Donbas (ISD; Ukrainian: Індустріальний союз Донбасу, romanized: Industrialnyi soiuz Donbasu) is one of the biggest corporations in Ukraine. It is a horizontally integrated holding company that owns or directs stocks of 40 industrial enterprises in East Ukraine, Hungary, and Poland. The company was created in 1995 and before the appearance of SCM Holdings in 2000 was a major steel rolling corporation in East Ukraine. According to Interfax, ISD produces 9.2 million of steel annually. In 2012 World Steel Association ranking the corporation placed 33rd sharing it with JSW Steel Ltd.

In 2021 a court process was initiated regarding bankruptcy of ISD. Later, the Alchevsk Coke-Chemical Factory was recognized bankrupt and proceedings were initiated to liquidate a business entity. In 2017 ISD was informing that lost control of the Alchevsk Coke-Chemical Factory.

== Stock holders ==
- Serhiy Taruta
- Oleh Mkrtchian
- Vitaliy Haiduk (left corporation)

In 2010 the Swiss-based Carbofer Group (associate of Evraz Group) along with a "group of investors" and the Vnesheconombank has purchased the controlling interest in corporation 50%+2 stocks. Because of that Vitaliy Haiduk left ISD. Earlier in 2007 Metalloinvest showed its interest to buy portion of ISD.

== List of holding's main enterprises ==
- Alchevsk Metallurgical Combine
- Alchevsk Coke-chemical Plant
- Dnieper Metallurgical Combine (Kamianske), in 2021 the Ukrainian Metinvest bought out the enterprise after it was recognized as bankrupt.
- ISD Dunaferr (Dunaújváros, since 2004), in July 2023 the British Liberty Steel acquired bankrupted Hungarian enterprise.

=== 2007 acquisitions ===
In 2007 ISD obtained from SCM Holdings the Kuibyshev Kramatorsk Metallurgical Plant (Kramatorsk) which was fighting against bankruptcy charges since 2006. At the end of 2012 the Donetsk Economical Court recognized Kramatorsk Metallurgical Plant as bankrupt, while most of its assets were transferred to two smaller factories - Kramatorsk Metal-rolling Plant and Kramatorsk Ferroalloy Plant.

ISD obtained 75% shares of the Gdansk Shipyard, with the remaining share held by the Polish government. The Polish government regained 50% in 2018.

=== Smaller companies ===
- Dnieper Pipe Plant (Pavlohrad, built in 2008)
- Enerhomashspetsstal (Kramatorsk)
- Panteleimon Refractory Plant (Horlivka)
- Agrarian companies: "Olha", "Zoria"
- Dianivska Poultry Farm
- Bakhmut Agrarian Union
- Karansky Grain Elevator

=== Media companies ===
- Internet publisher "ProUA"
- Comments newspaper (comments.ua)
- Economic news newspaper (www.eizvestia.com)
- Expert-Ukraine magazine
- Invest-Gazette

=== Sports ===
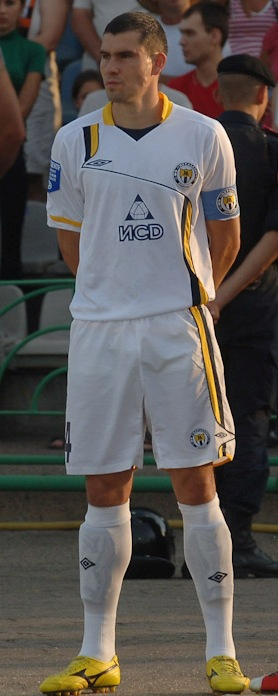
Vyacheslav Checher in the uniform of Metalurh Donetsk (name of the sponsor ИСD on his jersey)

- ISD sports club (www.sportclub-isd.com)
- FC Metalurh Donetsk (went bankrupt in 2015 and merged into Stal Kamianske)
- FC Stal Kamianske (moved to Bucha and became PFC Feniks Bucha before going bankrupt in 2018)
- HC Sokil Kyiv (sponsorship)

=== Former enterprises ===
- Khartsyzsk pipe plant
- Kramatorsk Metallurgical Plant
- ISD Huta Czestochowa (Częstochowa). (Since 22 January 2021 part of Liberty House Group.)

== Relations and controversies ==
Academics state that ISD provided significant financial support for Viktor Yuschenko during his presidential campaign and subsequent Orange Revolution. Vitaliy Haiduk (appointed by President Yushchenko) headed the National Security and Defense Council of Ukraine from October 2006 till May 2007. Haiduk also served as deputy minister and minister of fuel and energy from 2000 under former President Leonid Kuchma, who in 2002 promoted him to deputy prime minister. Haiduk also served as an adviser on energy to former Prime Minister Yulia Tymoshenko prior to 2010.

== See also ==
- Yevhen Shcherban#Assassination
