= Dnieper Metallurgical Combine =

Coordinates: 47°08′51″N 37°34′33″E

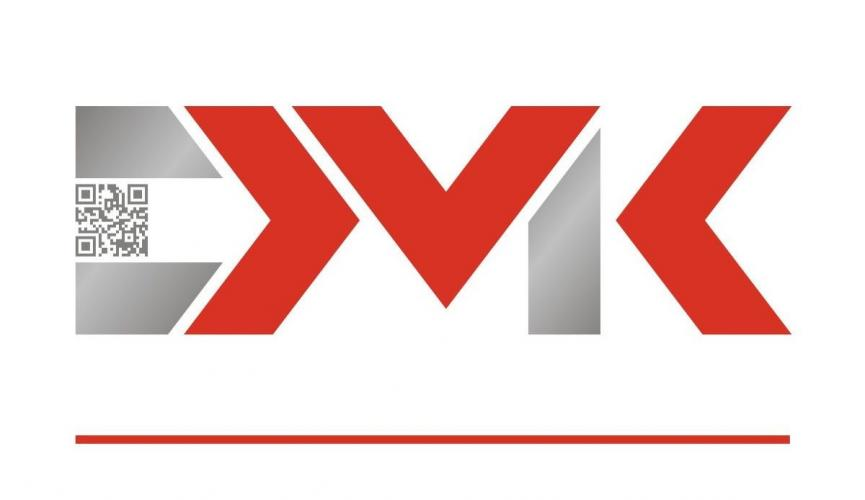
- Type: Public company
- Industry: Ferrous metallurgy
- Founded: 1887 / 1925
- Founder: South Russian Dnieper Association / Soviet Government
- Headquarters: Kamianske, Ukraine
- Products: cast iron, steel rolling, steel
- Revenue: 1,129,750,000 United States dollar (2023)
- Net income: −24,933,000 United States dollar (2023)
- Number of employees: 8,865 (2020)
- Parent: Industrial Union of Donbas
- Website: http://www.dmkd.dp.ua/

Dnieper Metallurgical Combine (Ukrainian: Дніпровський металургійний комбінат, romanized: Dniprovskyi Metalurhiynyi Kombinat) is one of the biggest metallurgical companies in Ukraine along with Kryvorizhstal and Illich Steel and Iron Works. It is located in Kamianske, Dnipropetrovsk Oblast.

== History ==
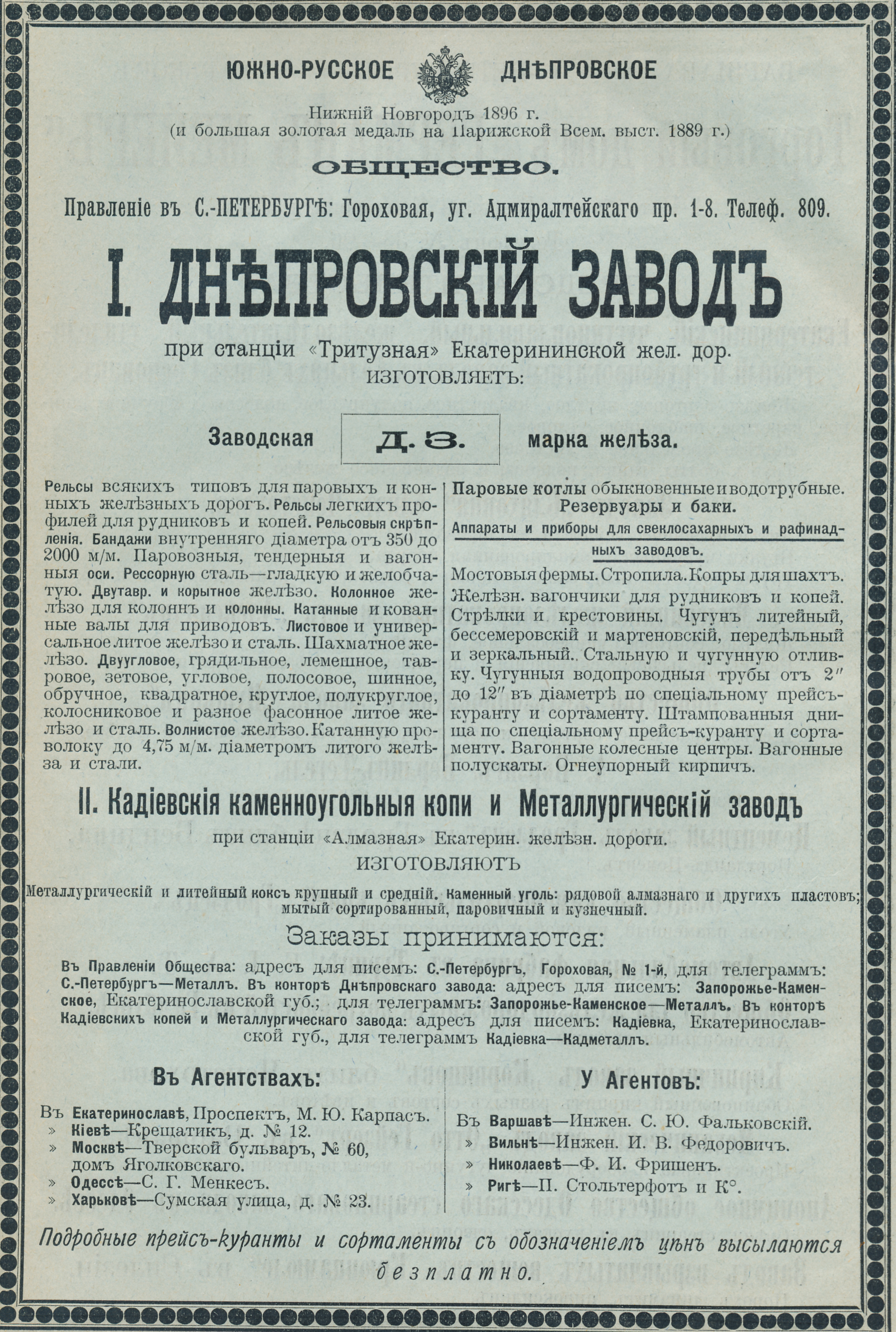
The 1907 advertisement of companies of the South-Russian Dnieper Association that mentions the Dnieper Works

The main plant was founded back in 1887 by the South-Russian Dnieper Association as the Dnieper Works.

With the occupation of Ukraine by Bolsheviks in 1917, the plant was "nationalized". Due to the war like situation in the region, the main plant did not operate consistently until 1925 when it was officially taken off the conservation and resumed its operations. The same year the plant received the name of Feliks Dzerzhynsky who at that time was a chairman of the Supreme Soviet of the National Economy.

About ten years later, the city of Kamianske where the plant is located, also followed the example and in 1936, it was renamed into Dniprodzerzhynsk.

== Present day ==
Dnieper Metallurgical Combine (DMC) specializes in the production of cast iron and rolled products and occupies a monopoly position in the market of wide-band universal steel and in the market of profiles. The plant supplier of rolled axial profile blanks for railway transport, sold mainly on the American market and certified by the Association of American Railroads. The plant supplies its products to Germany, Italy, Belgium, the CIS countries, the Middle East, China and the domestic market as well.

The plant was part of the Industrial Union of Donbas. The controlling stake belonged to structures affiliated with the Russian VEB. The minority owners are Serhiy Taruta and Oleg Mkrtchan. Since 2017, Metinvest has been part of the interests of Rinat Akhmetov and Vadym Novinsky. Since then, the supply of raw materials and the sale of finished products of the plant have been carried out through the structures of Metinvest.

On May 10, 2019, Serhiy Taruta announced the bankruptcy of the Dnipro Metallurgical Plant due to the aggressive actions of creditors. Creditors have declared demands on DMC in the amount of about UAH 130 billion. In October 2019, Dnieper Metallurgical Combine announced the shutdown of its main production facilities. The plant was put up for sale as part of a bankruptcy court case. On May 20, 2021, the Antimonopoly Committee allowed to buy DMC assets Rinat Akhmetov's company Metinvest BV. On July 26, 2021, the plant's assets were purchased by the Dnipro Coke Chemical Plant from the Metinvest group for UAH 9.1 billion.

DMC plans to invest $10 million in the capital repair project of blast furnace No. 9. The furnace will be shut down for 55 days from mid-July 2019.

In 2019, DMC plans to increase steel production to 3 million tons, due to the completion of the modernization of 3 MNLZs, according to the statement of the company's management.

On February 11, 2022, it was announced that the company would be renamed to KAMET-STEEL.

== See also ==
- List of steel producers
- Economy of Ukraine
- Metallurgy of Ukraine
