= List of SCM Group subsidiaries =

System Capital Management or SCM (Ukrainian: Систем Кепітал Менеджмент) is a major Ukrainian financial and industrial holding company which was established in Donetsk in the east of the country. Since 2014, the company has been headquartered in Kyiv. The business is controlled by a Ukrainian oligarch Rinat Akhmetov who owns 100% of the company shares. In 2010, the group has revenues of around $12.8 billion and has assets worth over $22.7 billion.

== SCM Holding ==
- System Capital Management
- SCM Advisors (UK)

== List of assets ==
- Metinvest holding (mining metallurgical complex)
- DTEK (energy engineering)
  - Corum Group (machine building)
- (banking and insurance finance services)
  - First Ukrainian International Bank (PUMB)
  - ASKA
  - ASKA-Zhyttia
- Vega telecom (telecommunications)
- ESTA Holding (real estate)
  - Donbass Palace (Donetsk)
  - Opera boutique hotel (Kiev)
  - Central Department store (Kiev)
  - Trading chambers in Ukraine, Russia, Kazakhstan
- United Minerals Group (UMG, clay mining)
  - Druzhkivka Quarry (Druzhkivka Ore Administration)
  - VESKO
  - Ogneupornerud (Fire Resistance non-Ore)
- Portinvest (Marine transportation, www.portinvest.com.ua)
- HarvEast Holding (agricultural business)
- Shakhtar Donetsk (football)
  - Donbass Arena

== Former assets ==
In July 2022 SCM Group owner and Ukrainian oligarch Rinat Akhmetov renounced his media assets due to an anti-oligarch law.

- Ukraina Media Group (media-business)
  - Ukrayina TV channel
  - Football 1 TV channel
  - Football 2 TV channel
  - Donbas TV channel
  - OLL.TV internet
    - Digital screens
  - NLO TV
- Segodnya Multimedia Publishing Group
  - Today Multimedia
    - segodnya.ua

== Related companies ==
- Lemtrans (Rail transportation)
- Dokuchayevsk Flux and Dolomite Combine
- Kryvbas Explosive Industries
- Novotroitsk Ore Administration
