= Rinat Akhmetov =

Ukrainian businessman (born 1966)

- Рінат Ахметов
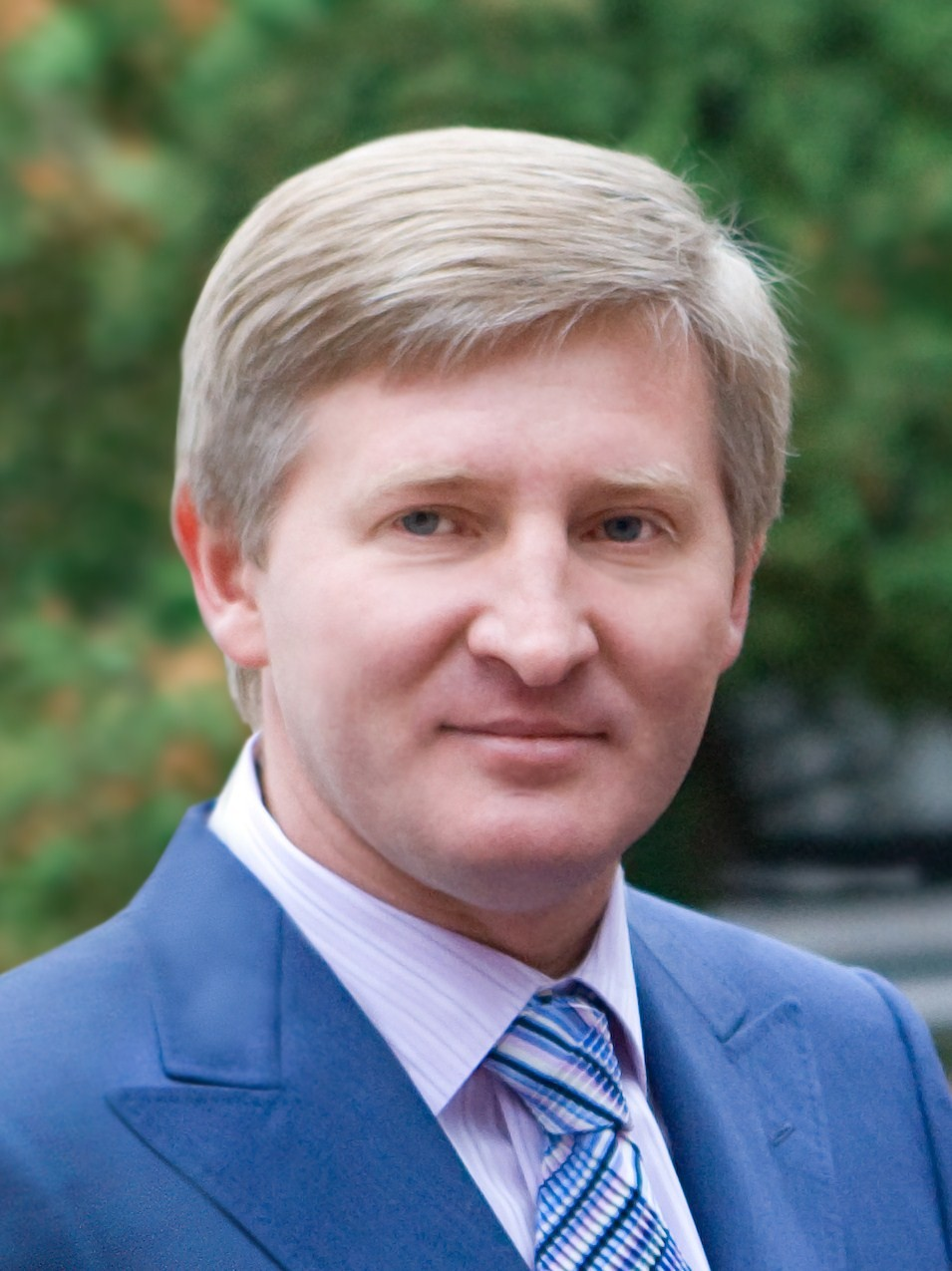
- Akhmetov in 2008
- Born: 21 September 1966 (age 60); Donetsk, Ukrainian SSR, Soviet Union (Note: Donetsk is claimed by both Russia and Ukraine. As of June 2026, Russia controls the city but is internationally recognized as being part of Ukraine.)
- Occupation: Businessman
- Known for: Owner, System Capital Management Group; Owner, Shakhtar Donetsk
- Spouse: Lilia Nikolayevna Smirnova
- Children: 2

Rinat Leonidovych Akhmetov (Note: Ukrainian: Рінат Леонідович Ахметов, pronounced [r⁽ʲ⁾iˈnɑt leoˈn⁽ʲ⁾idowɪtʃ ɐxˈmɛtou̯]; Russian: Ринат Леонидович Ахметов, pronounced [rʲɪˈnat lʲɪɐˈnʲidəvʲɪtɕ ɐˈxmʲetəf]; Tatar: Ринат Леонид улы Әхмәтов, romanized: Rinat Leonid uly Äkhmätov) (born 21 September 1966) is a Ukrainian oligarch, billionaire and businessman. He is the founder and president of international investment group System Capital Management (SCM), and is the wealthiest man in Ukraine.

As of May 2026, he was listed as the 483rd richest person in the world with an estimated net worth of US$7.8 billion. This made him one of six Ukrainian billionaires in 2026.

Akhmetov is the owner and president of the Ukrainian football club FC Shakhtar Donetsk. Since 2014, the Rinat Akhmetov Foundation has provided over 13 million food kits to the residents of Ukraine, and aid has reached more than 18 million people.

SCM businesses, the Rinat Akhmetov Foundation, and Shakhtar Football Club have collectively provided $368 million (UAH 13.5 billion) to aid Ukraine, its military, and civilians as of February 2026.

From 2006 to 2007 and 2007–2012, Akhmetov was a member of the Ukrainian Verkhovna Rada (parliament) for the Party of Regions. Later, in a comment to Radio Svoboda, he again called his move into politics a mistake: "And I have no intention of making the same mistake twice".

== Early life ==
Rinat Akhmetov was born in Donetsk, Ukrainian SSR, to a working-class family. He is an ethnic Volga Tatar and a practicing Sunni Muslim. His father, Leonid Alekseyevich Akhmetov, was a coal miner. His mother, Nyakiya Nasredinovna, was a shop assistant. His parents are Mishar Tatars and originate from the village of Surgod in the Torbeyevsky District of Mordovia.

Akhmetov had an older brother, Igor, who also worked as a coal miner but had to resign due to work-related health complications. Igor died on 24 January 2021.

Akhmetov earned a bachelor's degree in economics from Donetsk National University in 2001.

Akhmetov is married to Lilia Smirnova, an ethnic Russian. They have two sons.

== Business career ==
=== Beginnings ===
Details regarding Akhmetov's past, how he obtained his wealth after the fall of communism in Ukraine, and his activities between 1985 and 1995, remain controversial. Akhmetov has stated in interviews that he successfully made risky business investments in the first years after the collapse of the Soviet Union.

In an interview with The Guardian in May 2026, the businessman noted: "First of all we decided to trade in coke and coal, earning fairly small money. It started piling up and we began buying minority stakes in industrial companies. Stakes in metallurgy plants were very cheap as there was no competition from western businesspeople to invest in Ukraine, and many locals wanted to take their money to the west".

In 1992, Akhmetov said he and two partners started a company called ARS, which processed coal into coke — a key material in producing steel. Akhmetov said Bragin left ARS in 1993, but they remained close friends.

In a 2010 interview with Ukrainian News, Akhmetov denied inheriting any money from Akhat Bragin or anyone else, stating that he earned his "first million by trading coal and coke, and spent the money on assets that no one wanted to buy. It was a risk but it was worth it". Many publications in Ukraine and other European countries have made claims about Akhmetov's alleged "criminal past," though one Swiss newspaper later retracted such claims.

In a December 2022 interview with the Washington Post, Akhmetov said that he has "never been involved with any criminal organizations, I have never been prosecuted and no criminal charges were pressed against me."

Akhmetov and Leonid Kuchma, the second president of independent Ukraine, 2005

In his documentary book Donetsk Mafia: Anthology, Ukrainian author Serhiy Kuzin claims Akhmetov held the role of a 'mafia thug' in his early years. According to Hans van Zon, Professor of Central and Eastern European Studies in the University of Sunderland, "As early as 1986, Rinat and his brother Igor were involved in criminal activities." In 2008, the Donetsk Appellate Court ruled that the book was a work of plagiarism. The authors of the book, Borys Penchuk, Serhiy Kuzin, and the Anticorruption Foundation, were obliged to pay ₴200,000 in compensation for a breach of copyright to Oleksandr Kuchinsky, the editor-in-chief of Criminal Express regional weekly and the author of The Chronicle of Donetsk Banditry book after the Kyiv District Court found that Kuzin had copied significant portions of the authors' intellectual property while writing Donetsk Mafia: Anthology.

In the 1980s, Akhmetov acted as an assistant to Akhat Bragin, whom law enforcement agencies regarded as a powerful crime boss, allegedly in the illegal cloth trading business. Andrew Wilson, a scholar specializing in Ukrainian politics, categorized Akhmetov as an alleged former 'enforcer' and 'leader' of "[Akhat] Bragin's 'Tatar' clan", responsible for the use of "mafia methods to push aside the 'red directors' of the Industrial Union of Donbas (ISD)". By the early 1990s, Akhmetov began acquiring property in Donetsk allegedly by means of extortion with the assistance of Volodymyr Malyshev, Lieutenant-General of The Head of Ministry of Internal Affairs Department in Donetsk Oblast.

Malyshev, now a member of Ukraine's Parliament on the committee controlling law enforcement, is accused by Kuzin of using his position to do away with previously existing police records concerning Akhmetov shortly before becoming chief of security for Akhmetov's company. "In [the 1990s], Akhmetov was very different – he was totally private with no public persona, and was trying to find ways to deal with his 'difficult past'", noted U.S. ambassador William Taylor, citing prominent Ukrainian businessman Serhiy Taruta.

In October 1995, Bragin, president of Shakhtar Donetsk football club, was killed in a mysterious bombing along with six of his bodyguards at the team's stadium during a match. Some rumours associate Akhmetov with the death of Bragin. Following the assassinations, Akhmetov is said to have "inherited a vast financial empire from Bragin". Akhmetov himself recalls that Akhat was a very close friend of him, his death was a big tragedy for him personally, and he narrowly escaped the explosion himself. "Many say that the bomb detonated in the box (at the stadium). It is a lie. The explosion happened in the tunnel (leading to the box area)," he said. "We arrived at the stadium together, five minutes late. His car pulled up first, mine was second. Because we were late, he left his car and rushed inside without waiting for me. The gap was like five seconds, no more than that. The explosion happened when I opened the door of my car."

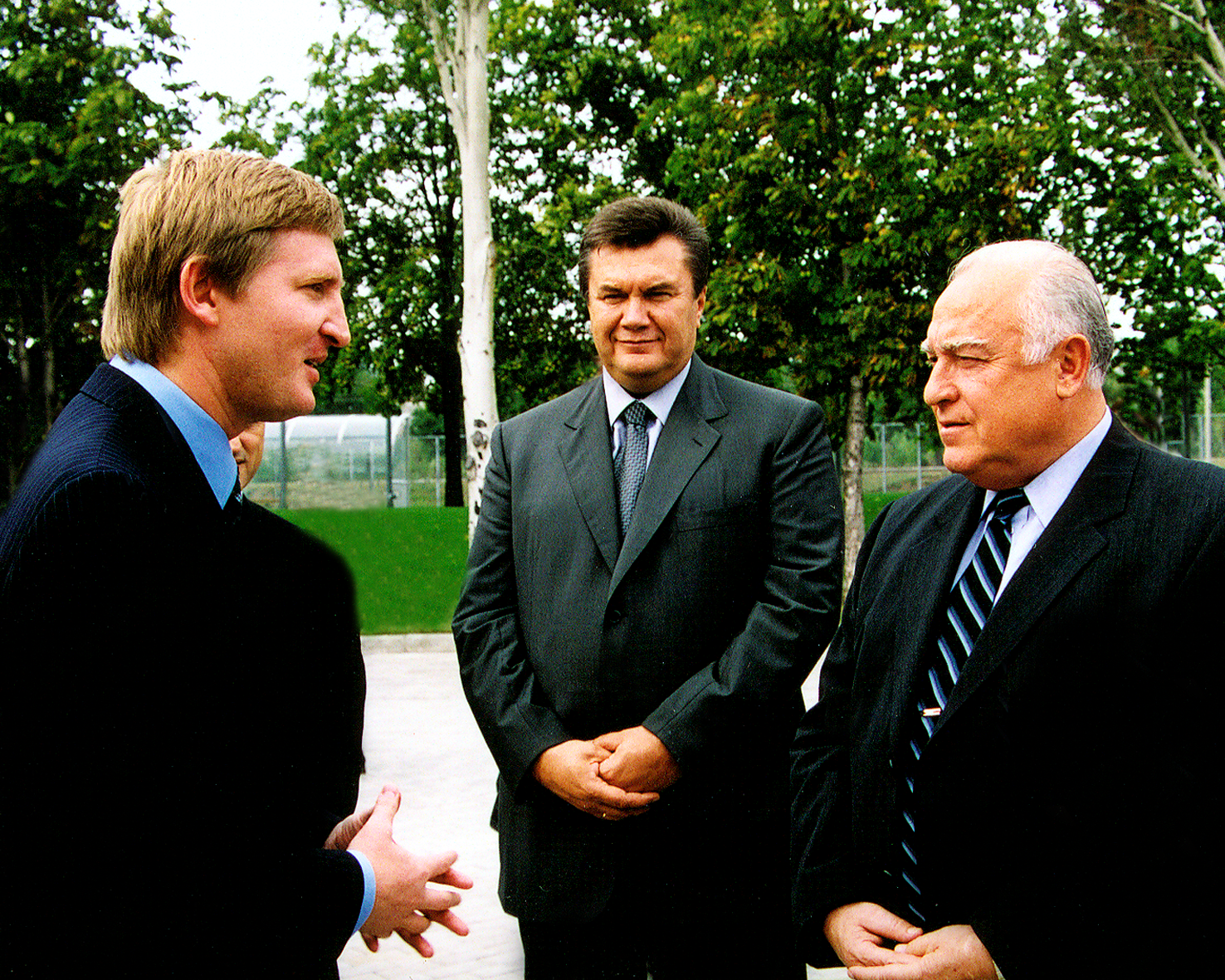
Akhmetov, Viktor Yanukovych and Viktor Chernomyrdin

Akhmetov headed Dongorbank, formerly Akceptbank, in 1995.

In September 1999, an official Ukrainian Ministry of Internal Affairs report titled the "Overview of the Most Dangerous Organized Crime Structures in Ukraine" identified Akhmetov as a leader of an organized crime syndicate. The report tied the group to money laundering, financial fraud, and the control of numerous large and fictitious companies. The report also says that the group's activities "have been stopped," and says further that their criminal natures "have not been confirmed". In a written statement, System Capital Management said that the internal affairs report "has been fully and publicly shown to be a fraud and a forgery" — conclusions that SCM noted were "reached and publicly disclosed in November 2011" by a Ukrainian parliamentary committee and the Ministry of Interior.

According to a leaked diplomatic cable, Volodymyr Horbulin, one of Ukraine's most respected policy strategists and former presidential advisor, told the U.S. Ambassador to Ukraine in 2006 that the Party of Regions, which "enjoyed deep pockets, being largely financed by billionaire Donetsk boss Rinat Akhmetov" is partly composed of "pure criminals" and "criminal and anti-democracy figures". In a U.S. diplomatic cable dated 3 February 2006, then U.S. Ambassador John Herbst referred to Akhmetov's Party of Regions as "long a haven for Donetsk-based mobsters and oligarchs" and called Akhmetov the "godfather" of the Donetsk Clan. Further in that article cited the answer of the spokesperson for Akhmetov addressed to the Kyiv Post: "We don't know whether this phrase is authentic and what it actually means. Although, any accusations of Mr Akhmetov's involvement in criminal structures is slander."

In 2014, Rinat Akhmetov's support of the peace process in Donbas and his assistance to civilians in Donetsk and Luhansk regions were highly appreciated by the United States. U.S. Ambassador to Ukraine, Geoffrey R. Pyatt who stated that he highly appreciates the efforts of Rinat Akhmetov "who has done probably more than anyone in this country to deliver food and clothes to victims of the violence occurring in Donbas".

After Ukraine's Orange Revolution of late 2004, in an attempt to fight corruption, several prominent businessmen who were also Party of Regions members came under criminal investigation. In 2011, Hennadiy Moskal, who in 2005 acted as the Deputy Minister of Internal Affairs of Ukraine, gave an interview to Ukrainian magazine Профиль (profil-ua), where he claimed to have been under Presidential orders in 2005 to investigate and audit Akhmetov for his alleged role in organized crime. Concrete evidence was never officially revealed against him, nor his company.

According to Moskal, the MVS investigated all incidents related to missing people in the 1990s in Donetsk region, who had any property left, and its current owners. No connections with Rinat Akhmetov and his entourage were found. Looking back, Moskal concluded that "we had nothing on Akhmetov in 2005". According to political journal's Post-Soviet Affairs, and The Nation, Akhmetov was investigated on murder charges and for his alleged role in organized crime in the Donetsk region. To avoid prosecution he was prompted to flee the country to Monaco.

In June 2005, Serhiy Kornich, then head of the Interior Ministry's economic crimes department, stated publicly that Akhmetov was "the head of [an] organized crime group." That year, Borys Kolesnikov, a friend and associate who had been tied to Akhmetov since the 1980s, was arrested on charges of extortion and conspiracy to assassinate a rival Donetsk businessman. Charges against Akhmetov and Kolesnikov were dropped in 2006 amid a significant rise in political power by the former, and the cooperation of the Yushchenko government, ending Akhmetov's exile.

=== SCM Group ===
Akhmetov founded System Capital Management Group (JSC "SCM") in 2000. SCM is the largest diversified financial and industrial group in Ukraine with interests around the world. The structure of SCM Group includes more than 250 companies employing about 150,000 people in Ukraine, the U.S., Europe, and across the globe.

SCM's main areas of interest and activities are metallurgy and coal mining, power generation, telecommunications, and banking. In various periods, Akhmetov controlled from 90% to 100% of the shares of SCM. He has been its sole proprietor since 2009.

The main assets of Rinat Akhmetov, according to information for 2022, include the following companies:

- SCM Holdings
- Metinvest (mining and metallurgical business)
- DTEK (energy industry)
- First Ukrainian International Bank (finance)
- Ukrtelecom (telecommunication business)
- ESTA Holding (real estate)
- Corum Group (mechanical engineering; formerly Ukrvuglemash and Mining Machines)
- UMG Investments (investments; formerly United Mineral Group)
- Portinvest, Lemtrans, Transinvest holding (transport business)
- HarvEast Holding (agriculture)
- FC Shakhtar Donetsk (sport)

According to Serhiy Holovnev and Yuriy Vinnichuk, in 2018 SCM enterprises paid ₴90.2 billion, or 22.6% of all tax revenues to the government budget of Ukraine.

In H1 2022, SCM paid about €1.2 billion in taxes to the national budget, becoming the country's biggest private taxpayer in the wartime.

According to the results of 2022, the enterprises of the SCM investment group sent ₴73.2 billion (almost $2 billion) of taxes and fees to the budgets of all levels.

According to the results of 2023 and 2024, Ukrainian, associated and joint enterprises of the SCM investment group paid $1.8 billion in taxes and fees to budgets of all levels each year. During the war, SCM increased its investments in Ukraine by one and a half times.

Capital investments SCM made in 2024 reached nearly $1 billion, primarily focused on restoring and enhancing the security of key enterprises. Most of these funds were allocated to the capital repair of thermal power plant unit installations, drilling of oil and gas wells, opening new coal mining longwalls, capital and routine maintenance of metallurgical equipment, and infrastructure improvements.

Over four years of war, by March 2026, SCM companies owned by businessman Rinat Akhmetov had invested around $4 billion in rebuilding infrastructure destroyed by Russia, developing new facilities and modernising production. Of that amount, nearly $1 billion was directed specifically to the urgent restoration of infrastructure facilities destroyed as a result of Russian shelling and massive air attacks.

SCM businesses and companies owned by Rinat Akhmetov paid $2.2 billion in taxes in 2025. In total, more than $8 billion in taxes has been paid over the four years since the start of the full-scale invasion.

Capital investment in 2025 reached nearly $1.4 billion. The lion's share was directed towards rebuilding infrastructure destroyed by Russia and protecting key enterprises, while SCM companies also invested heavily in modernising production, strengthening energy security and expanding Ukraine's logistics network.

NV Business analyzed the contribution of the 55 largest companies of Ukraine to aid to the country from 24 February 2022 to April 2024. SCM is in first place in terms of contribution. In total, this is UAH 8 billion. The publication notes that assistance to businesses is not limited to finance. In the country, "a new industry of defense tech was born" – the production of products necessary for soldiers. For example, SCM produces fortifications, protection for US Abrams tanks, and other things the military needs as part of the Steel Front initiative. The Steel Front initiative does not provide offensive materials.

Mariupol-based Azovstal and Illich Iron and Steel Works, destroyed by Russia, were the backbone of Akhmetov's steel business. Other steel companies, Zaporizhstal and Kametstal, had to curtail production significantly.

By July 2022, Akhmetov's DTEK has lost 70% of renewables facilities and 30% of thermal power generation plants.

Also, Rinat Akhmetov lost his coke plants in Avdiivka, the Luhanska, Zaporizhia and Kurakhivska thermal power stations, and the Kurakhivska Coal Processing Plant. In January 2025, Metinvest announced the suspension of operations at the Pokrovske Coal Group.

In 2023, DTEK commenced operations of the first phase of 565MW Tylihul Wind Power Plant —the world's first wind farm built during a war, situated just 100 km from the front line.

In 2023, Akhmetov was not afraid to complete the first stage and to start building the second stage of the Tylihul wind farm, the largest in Europe. This project is supported by the European Commission and the governments of Ukraine and Denmark. Total investment will make 650 million euros. In September 2023, DTEK received the Renewable Top Plant Award from the U.S. energy magazine POWER for this project.

At the international Ukraine Recovery Conference in Rome in summer 2025, DTEK Renewables presented one of Ukraine's flagship energy recovery projects – the DTEK Poltavska Wind Farm. With an installed capacity of 650 MW and an estimated cost of nearly $1 billion, it is set to become the largest wind farm in Ukraine. Construction is scheduled to begin in early 2026.

DRI, a subsidiary of Akhmetov's energy business DTEK, acquired an energy storage facility from the Polish company Columbus in late March 2024 in Trzebinia. Upon becoming operational, this facility will be the largest of its kind in Poland and one of the largest in Europe.

In June 2025 DTEK secured a $72-million loan to build it.

Also in June 2025 Reuters wrote that Britain's Octopus Energy Group and DTEK are seeking to raise 100 million euros ($115 million) over the next three years to help fund up to 100 solar and battery projects in Ukraine. Their initiative was designed to strengthen energy security in the country, where conventional power plants have been targeted in Russian attacks since its invasion in 2022.

World heavyweight boxing champion Oleksandr Usyk is supporting efforts to rebuild country's energy system after brutal Russian attacks: Usyk is partnering energy company DTEK to draw global attention to the plight of Ukraine's civilian power system.

Critics point out that at different times SCM used the political conjuncture for its development. For example, in 2004 Akhmetov and Pinchuk privatized Kryvorizhstal for $0.8 billion. But in 2005, re-privatization was carried out: the plant was bought by Mittal Steel Company for $4.8 billion. In January 2014 SCM businesses won 31% of all state tenders.

At the same time, researchers note that SCM Group has been trying to be a transparent corporation since its inception. SCM was one of the first in Ukraine to begin publishing social reports (2007). It was several times the leader in the rankings of Ukraine's "Socially Responsible Companies", and in 2011, together with its subsidiaries Metinvest and DTEK, it entered the top five of the Index of Transparency and Accountability of Companies in Ukraine.

During 2023, DTEK paid UAH 40.2 billion in taxes. During the full-scale war (from 2022 to early 2025), his company invested $1.2 billion in Ukraine in power grids, repairs and restoration of power plants, construction of new capacities, as well as sustainable production of coal, oil and gas.

His companies are trusted in the US, and he will transport LNG to Ukraine in 2024.

In July 2024 US company Venture Global has signed the first significant deal to supply liquefied natural gas to Ukraine. Ukraine's DTEK should began buying an unspecified amount of LNG cargoes from Venture Global later that year and continuing through the end of 2026.

In addition, DTEK has committed to buying up to 2mn tonnes a year of LNG from Venture Global's yet-to-be constructed CP2 project, also in Louisiana, over a 20-year period.

Financial Times called the deal "the latest step towards meeting a big goal of the Biden administration — to increase energy exports to eastern Europe and in the process reduce Russia's power in the region following its full-scale invasion of Ukraine in 2022".

While Europe was already the largest recipient of US liquefied natural gas exports, none have ever been purchased directly by Ukraine before. In December 2024, DTEK delivered its first shipment of liquefied natural gas (LNG) from the United States to Ukraine via an import terminal in Greece.

In the middle of 2023, Bloomberg states that due to the invasion, the oligarchs in Ukraine hid a significant part of their influence.

A new stadium for Everton FC, officially opened in the UK in April 2025, was constructed with 1,000 tons of hot-rolled steel from Spartan UK, a subsidiary of the Metinvest Group owned by Akhmetov.

Also in August 2025, Spartan UK signed a contract to supply 1,600 tonnes of steel plate for the construction of the new Sizewell C nuclear power plant on the Suffolk coast – one of the biggest energy infrastructure projects in the United Kingdom in recent decades.

In 2026, he purchased a €471 million ($554 million) apartment in Monaco, an amount representing 7% of his net worth. According to Bloomberg, this stands as the most expensive sale in real estate history.

=== Wealth ===
Rinat Akhmetov has been number one in Korrespondent magazine annual Ukraine's Top 50 richest people rating with the estimated wealth of:

- 2006 – $11.8 bn
- 2007 – $15.6 bn
- 2008 – $31.1 bn
- 2009 – $9.6 bn
- 2010 – $17.8 bn
- 2011 – $25.6 bn
- 2012 – $17.8 bn
- 2013 – $18.3 bn
- 2014 – $10.1 bn
- 2019 – $7.7 bn
- 2020 – $7.7 bn
- 2021 – $8.5 bn

Forbes' The World's Billionaires rating:

- 2006 – No. 451 with a net worth of $1.7 bil
- 2007 – No. 214 with $4.0 bn
- 2008 – No. 127 with $7.3 bn
- 2009 – No. 397 with $1.8 bn
- 2010 – No. 148 with $5.2 bn
- 2011 – No. 39 with $16 bn.
- 2012 – No. 39 with $16 bn.
- 2013 – No. 47 with $15.4 bn.
- 2015 – No. 201 with $6.7 bn.
- 2016 – No. 771 with $3.4 bn.
- 2017 – No. 359 with $4.6 bn
- 2018 – No. 334 with $5.5 bn
- 2019 – No. 272 with $6 bn
- 2020 – No. 875 with $2.4 bn
- 2021 – No. 327 with $7.6 bn
- 2022 – No. 687 with $4.3 bn
- 2023 – No. 442 with $5.7 bn
- 2024 – No. 785 with $4 bn
- 2025 – No. 390 with $7.9 bn
- 2026 – No. 477 with $7.8 bn

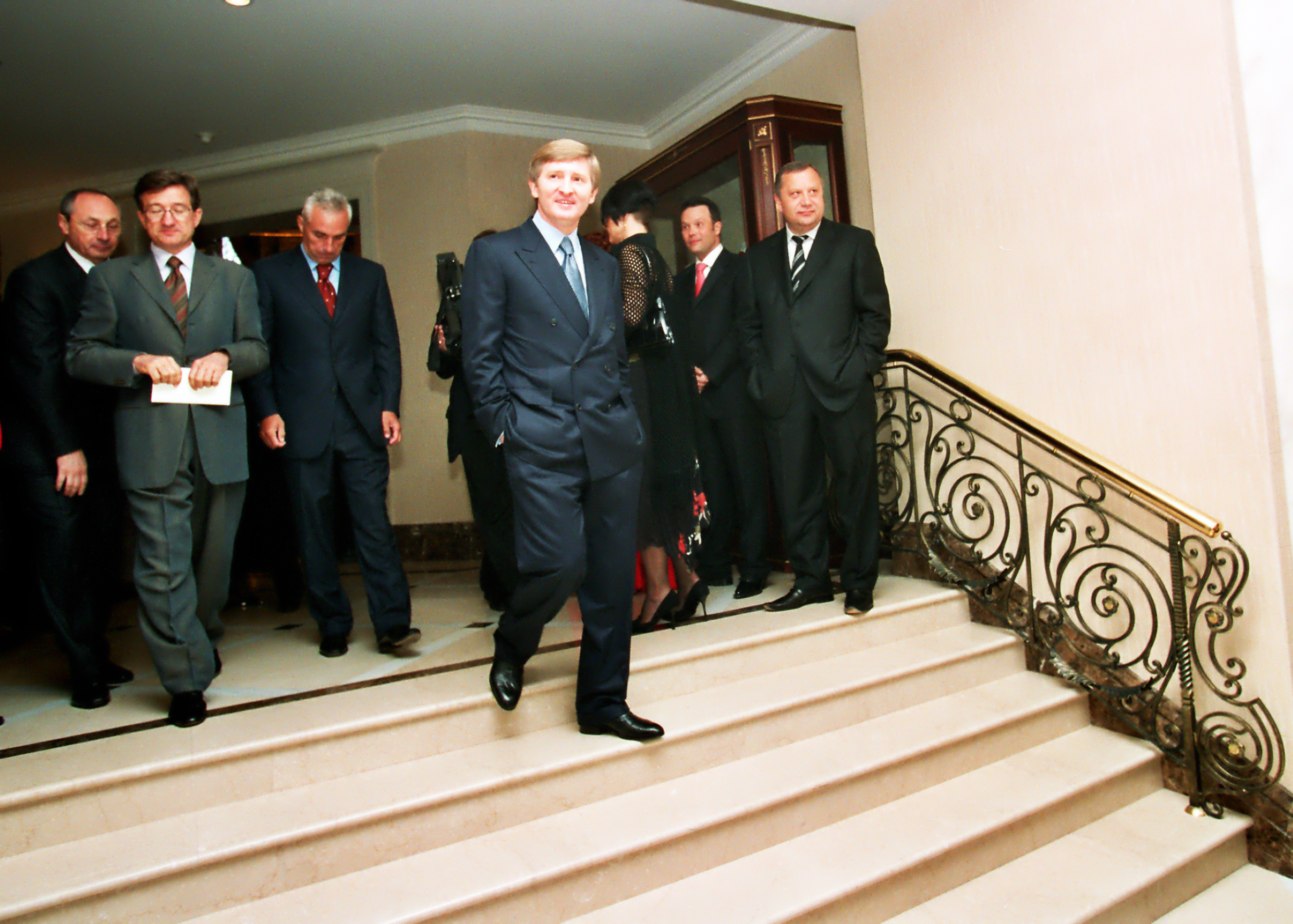
Akhmetov with Donbas oligarch Serhiy Taruta

In 2018 Akhmetov's fortune was valued at approx. $5.9 billion. Bloomberg reported that he was the richest person in Ukraine and that he had regained all of his losses suffered after the conflict with Russia in 2013–2014. Rinat Akhmetov's key assets are based in the east and south of Ukraine. Since the beginning of the war in February 2022, he has lost two thirds of his fortune, including steel, energy and agricultural assets. Overall, Russian forces have destroyed about 70 companies owned by Rinat Akhmetov.

In February 2023 all of Akhmetov's assets in Russian occupied Donbas were confiscated. The local Russian installed authorities justified this by declaring Akhmetov a "rogue individual."

== Political activity ==
Akhmetov has been noted as a financier and unofficial leader of the Party of Regions political party.

Following the Orange Revolution, Akhmetov was pivotal in arranging a lasting relationship between his employee and close friend Paul Manafort and defeated presidential candidate Viktor Yanukovich.

In a September 2007 diplomatic cable released between prominent Ukrainian business partners Serhiy Taruta, Vitaliy Haiduk, and U.S. ambassador William Taylor, Taruta alleged that Akhmetov had in 1997 persuaded Ukrainian president Leonid Kuchma to appoint Viktor Yanukovych governor of Donetsk oblast, who then made Haiduk his deputy. Akhmetov's spokesperson refused comment on the matter, and Haiduk denied the conversation taking place.

Akhmetov was elected as a member of Ukraine's Verkhovna Rada (parliament) during the 2006 Ukrainian parliamentary election, as a member of the Party of Regions. Akhmetov was reelected during the 2007 parliamentary election, again as a member of the Party of Regions. He only appeared once in the Verkhovna Rada building during his inauguration.

Leader of the party's faction in the Verkhovna Rada, Oleksander Yefremov, has mentioned that Rinat Akhmetov provides "substantive support" to the faction by providing what he referred to as "functioning expert groups he established that are counseling on draft laws". In December 2011 Akhmetov announced he was not going to participate in the 2012 parliamentary election.

U.S. diplomatic cables revealed that Akhmetov posted $2 million bail in 2007 for the release of three members of the Party of Regions, including former Sumy Governor Volodymyr Shcherban, who was accused of election rigging, extortion, tax evasion and abuse of office.

=== Reaction to the war in Donbas ===
In an interview with The Guardian in May 2026, Rinat Akhmetov recalled that at the beginning of the occupation of Donbas, he addressed the Kremlin-backed proxies at Donbas Arena and said: "You're good for nothing, you're terrorists. You need to be pushed out, you deceive the people. You bring Donbas to the grave." We put banners around the region with the motto: "A happy Donetsk and happy Donbas can only be part a unified Ukraine." People ask what I would say today to those in occupied regions, and it would be exactly the same.

Akhmetov has denied claims made by Pavel Gubarev (self-proclaimed "People's Governor" of the Donetsk People's Republic) in an interview published in the Russian state-controlled newspaper Rossiyskaya Gazeta on 12 May 2014. "Pavel Gubarev alleges that I bribed two thirds of the activists. I am firmly stating that I have never given and will never give anyone even a cent of bribe", replied Akhmetov.

According to Gubarev, Akhmetov has financed the separatist movement in the region, and the separatists "all took money" from Akhmetov and others, saying that "As it turned out, two-thirds of the activists were supported by the oligarch Akhmetov". On 10 May 2014, Akhmetov's Metinvest company announced it would be forming an unarmed militia of steelworker employees to stop looting by separatists and criminals in the city of Mariupol.

In a 19 May (2014) breaking news message on Ukrayina TV, Akhmetov claimed the representative "of this Donetsk People's Republic" were committing "genocide of Donbas". At his initiative the next day a so-called Peace March was held in the stadium Donbass Arena in Donetsk accompanied by cars beeping their horns at noon. Akhmetov has vowed that "siren [will be] ringing every day at noon across all of Donbas until peace is established".

Akhmetov is helping the victims of the war in Donbas. As of March 2014 he had allocated ₴35 million for this assistance. The Rinat Akhmetov Humanitarian Centre was established in August 2014 to provide maximum assistance to all civilians of Donetsk and Luhansk Regions affected by the military actions. The centre has pooled resources of the Foundation and all of SCM Group's businesses and FC Shakhtar. The activity of the centre is dedicated to financial, humanitarian, medical and psychological assistance for the victims of the war, and evacuation from the hot spots in the East of Ukraine.

In August 2014 Akhmetov's Foundation for Development of Ukraine started a project called Humanitarian Aid Drives. The purpose of this project is the regular delivery of food and children's packages to Donbas. As of October 2016 over 10 million food packages were provided to IDPs and residents of 57 districts and settlements of the Donetsk and Luhansk regions. The package includes flour, sugar, cereals, oats, tinned foods, sunflower oil, stew, pasta, canned corn, gingerbreads and condensed milk.

Akhmetov has made numerous statements, since March 2014, appealing for integrity of Ukraine and finding peaceful solutions of the crisis. He believes decentralization should be part of this peaceful solution.

In March 2017, protesters attacked Akhmetov's offices in Russian controlled areas. Pro-Russian separatists in the Donbas region seized control of companies owned by energy conglomerate DTEK, and steel company Metinvest, both owned by Akhmetov. Companies in the region controlled by the Luhansk People's Republic (LPR) took control of several Akhmetov owned companies.

Continued protests throughout 2017 led to allegations of corruption and profiteering between Akhmetov and President Petro Poroshenko, specifically over pricing for domestic coal suppliers and the buyout of DTEK debts by the government. On 27 August 2020, the Specialised Anti-Corruption Prosecutor's Office (SAPO) dismissed the criminal case concerning Rotterdam+ due to the lack of elements of crime. According to the SAPO, the investigation of suspects was closed as Rotterdam+ had not generated any losses.

=== Quitting media business ===
In November 2021 Ukrainian president Volodymyr Zelenskyy accused Akhmetov of being enlisted to help plan a coup against him by Russia. Akhmetov has denied these claims, calling the allegations "an absolute lie." The allegations were the culmination of a dispute between Zelenskyy and Akhmetov, as part of Zelenskyy anti-corruption clean-up efforts. Akhmetov is a noted opponent of Zelenskyy. His TV channels backed one of his opponents in the 2019 election and have been increasingly critical in coverage of Zelenskyy, especially since the government failed to reimburse one of his energy company subsidiaries for green energy purchased by state companies.

Akhmetov says that he does not interfere with the channels' editorial policy and that it's the "guests who come to the channels" and not the channels themselves that criticize Zelenskyy. In turn, Zelenskyy's MPs have boycotted what they view as hostile media. Akhmetov announced on 11 July 2022 that he would surrender licences of top television channels to the government and shut down both print and internet media to comply with so-called "de-oligarchisation" legislation aimed at curbing the influence of oligarchs. "I made an involuntary decision that my investment company SCM will exit its media business," Akhmetov said in a statement.

The Minister of Justice, Denys Maliuska, said that Rinat Akhmetov no longer fits the definition of an oligarch, as he has left the media business, and his business partner Vadym Novynskyi has completed the mandate of the Peopleʼs Deputy.

=== Activities during the Russian invasion ===
Akhmetov is the largest donor to the United Armed Forces of Ukraine. According to a study by the Ukrainian publication of the NV, in April 2025, the largest donor among business groups in Ukraine was Akhmetov's SCM Group.

"I have said more than once and I will say it again: happy Donetsk, happy Donbas can only be in a united and happy Ukraine," he said on 16 February 2022.

Financial Times reported in June 2022 that Rinat Akhmetov has allocated €100 million in humanitarian aid and support for the Ukrainian military during the first months of the 2022 Russian invasion of Ukraine. SCM businesses, the Rinat Akhmetov Foundation and Shakhtar Football Club have sent more than $223 million to help the country, the military and civilians during the 24 months of the full-scale invasion.

As of May 2024 they have collectively provided over $258 million (more than €242 million) in aid.

As of October 2025, sum of aid makes more than $350 million. As of February 2026 it makes $368 million.

On 22 February, as hundreds took to the streets of Mariupol to protest Russia's actions, Akhmetov announced SCM would pay ₴1 billion ($34 million) in taxes in advance to shore up state finances.

Reflecting on the events leading up to the full-scale invasion, Akhmetov told The Guardian: "I arrived in Kyiv on 23 February to attend a meeting organised for businessmen by President Zelenskyy. A journalist asked me what, if there would be a full-scale invasion tomorrow, my actions would be. I responded: "I will stay in Ukraine, I will not leave or travel anywhere, I will be helping our military and our army to stand strong, and I'll be helping civilian people to survive." And it seems to me that I stuck to the promise".

The Azovstal plant in Mariupol, owned by Akhmetov, was the site of fierce fighting during the Siege of Mariupol and was almost completely destroyed.

In the comment to The Wall Street Journal Akhmetov stated that both steel plants in Mariupol were under Ukrainian control, but that the plants were temporarily shut down, saying, "Russian troops are turning Mariupol into rubble, killing Mariupol residents, and bombing the plants," he said. "Under no circumstances will these plants operate under Russian occupation."

On 20 May 2022 Azovstal Steel Plant defenders had an order from higher command to surrender. Mr Akhmetov recalls his conversation with commander Denys Prokopenko just 15 minutes before they left the plant. "I said: "Denys, what can I do for you, what can I do for your guys"? "He responded: "You needn't worry about me, please take care of my men". This is how the "Heart of Azovstal" project came to life.

In January 2023, Akhmetov announced the launch of the Heart of Azovstal project to help Mariupol defenders and the families of fallen soldiers. He donated $25 million to finance the project. Sum was then increased to around $55 million in 2026.

As a result of the invasion, Akhmetov's fortune dropped from nearly $14 billion to less than $6 billion in just two weeks, and may likely be much less, according to Forbes. According to Akhmetov, "A total ceasefire, complete withdrawal of Russian troops from Ukraine, and full restoration of the internationally recognized borders of Ukraine. That includes the Crimea and Donbas" were his terms of a Ukrainian victory in the conflict. "My Foundation is helping Ukrainians survive by providing water, food, medicines, and any help we can give here and now. SCM businesses are helping the army and territorial defense forces to defend our sovereignty, our freedom, and independence, and win the war ... I am working with my company and my people. I am doing everything I can. I am confident that other people are doing the same."

In 2024, it became known that Akhmetov's fortune is estimated at $4 billion (via Forbes). This is $1.7 billion less the figure from 2023.

In December 2022, The Washington Post called Akhmetov Ukraine's biggest private donor during the war, who provided over $100 million in military and humanitarian aid, "from drones to food".

One year into the war, in February 2023, the SCM businesses, the Rinat Akhmetov Foundation and the Shakhtar football club provided assistance to Ukraine, the military and civilians for $150 million in goods and services, including infrastructure repair and energy supplies. Assistance reached more than 18 million people across the country and includes body armor, vehicles, equipment and fortifications for the Ukrainian Defence Forces, medicines and other humanitarian aid for civilians, and efforts to keep critical infrastructure up and running.

As of August 2023, the total assistance provided by Akhmetov during the war reached more than 165 million euros ($175 mln).

Over 24 months of the full-scale invasion, SCM businesses, the Rinat Akhmetov Foundation, and FC Shakhtar have collectively channelled more than $223 million (€210 million) towards helping Ukraine, its military, and civilians.

The Saving Lives initiative established by Metinvest, in concert with the Rinat Akhmetov Foundation, was meant to prevent a food crisis in Ukraine in the wartime. Contributions from the international partners and benefactors has helped provide 442,326 people with many kinds of assistance. It hands over food packages, hygiene kits, and medicines to Dnipropetrovsk, Zaporizhzhia, Donetsk, Kirovohrad, Kherson, and Odesa regions, taking care of shelters, and supporting local administrations.

Rinat Akhmetov's Steel Front is an initiative launched by businessman Rinat Akhmetov to support the Ukrainian Armed Forces and other defence forces during the Russian invasion of Ukraine that started in 2022.

SCM's businesses provide an extensive support to the Armed Forces of Ukraine, territorial defenders, the National Guard, National Police, Main Intelligence Directorate, and other military and security units. Metinvest also works to protect conscripted employees, utility workers, rescuers, military doctors, representatives of the national media who work in the combat areas by providing transport, drones, protective engineering structures, body armour, protective equipment, and medical assistance.

As of 24 February 2024 Rinat Akhmetov's Steel Front initiative donated more than 5000 drones, 1200 cars and special vehicles, more than 200,000 body armour items, including 170,000 bulletproof vests, 1,1 million litres of fuel to the Armed Forces of Ukraine, territorial defenders, and communities.

Metinvest is using its steel to make Czech hedgehogs slowing the advance of Russian tanks. The initiative also handed over 3 armored amphibious assault ships to the GUR in June 2024.

Shakhtar Donetsk, the football club sponsored by Akhmetov, opened this year Shelter Center at the Arena Lviv, since then it has received more than 2,000 internal migrants from different regions of Ukraine. As of the end of August, there were 6,000 temporary accommodation places arranged by Metinvest at its social facilities. The shelter residents receive hot meals, food and hygienic kits. The company has arranged 850 accommodation places in six Dnipropetrovsk and Kyrovohrad communities.

For three years of Russia's full invasion of Ukraine, DTEK returned power to more than 17 million households. The company's power engineers respond swiftly to re-energise localities cut off electricity supply because of hostilities.

After the power plants in Kharkiv and Dnipropetrovsk oblasts were hit by Russian missile strikes, causing widespread blackouts in five regions of Ukraine, Rinat Akhmetov and DTEK Group decided to start helping restore electricity supply all over Ukraine, even in the areas not covered by DTEK power grid.

In 2022, Akhmetov's DTEK has been supplying free electricity worth ₴350 million (later $10 million) to medical and military facilities in Kyiv, Dnipropetrovsk, and Donetsk oblasts.

Metinvest has developed special chemical composition of steel to produce plates for body armour. As of February 2023 the company has already provided 170,000 bulletproof vests to the army, the territorial defence forces, law enforcement agencies, and members of emergency rescue teams.

Highlighted by Bloomberg, the latest development of Metinvest's specialists is prefabricated dugouts, or portable steel war shelters for Ukrainian defenders. These special shelters for strengthening trenches can be used as a full-fledged field accommodation and one such shelter costs about ₴200,000 ($5,450). Like all other equipment and protective gear, Metinvest delivers the shelters to the military free of charge. The company has already sent 123 (170 as for April 2023) of them to the front lines. The company has already sent 200 for July 2023 and 500 for May 2024 to the front lines.

The Sun published an exclusive report on a frontline underground hospital created with the support of Rinat Akhmetov's Steel Front initiative. The article described the hospital as "one of the most remarkable innovations of the three-year war."

In August 2025, the official U.S. Army website published an analytical report titled "Ukrainian Underground: Lessons for MEDCOM Support in Large-Scale Combat Operations", prepared by the Center for Army Lessons Learned (CALL) for the U.S. Army Medical Command. Its author, Colonel Joseph (J.J.) Serowik, emphasised the importance of Ukraine's collaboration with private sector, in particular with Metinvest Group and Rinat Akhmetov's Steel Front initiative. This partnership demonstrates the rapid adaptation of Ukraine's medical infrastructure to enemy attacks, including the construction of NATO-standard underground Level II stabilisation facilities near the front line.

At the Ukraine Recovery Conference (URC) in Rome in summer 2025, the State Agency for Restoration of Ukraine, together with Metinvest Group, presented the Citadel project – prefabricated steel underground shelters to be installed in Ukrainian schools to protect children during air-raid alerts.

Metinvest, through «Steel Front» initiative, established the serial production and supply of anti-mine trawls for tanks that assist counteroffensives to the Armed Forces of Ukraine.

In December 2023, Metinvest has donated 10 high-speed boats, 12 trailers for their transportation and 800 self-inflating life jackets worth a total of UAH53 million to help the armed forces to resist the enemy on the water.

Metinvest has launched the mass production of engineered structures that act as "lancet catchers" to protect the valuable military equipment of the Armed Forces of Ukraine from enemy drone attacks. As for September 2023, Metinvest has donated 32 shelter structures to the AFU. Despite the war, Metinvest has increased the salaries of its employees since 1 May 2024.

Akhmetov told Forbes: "I am in Ukraine and I am not going to leave the country. I share the same feelings with all Ukrainians: I am sincerely waiting for the victory of Ukraine in this war."

From 24 February to early May 2022, Akhmetov's businesses, his Foundation, and FC Shakhtar have donated almost US$72 million in humanitarian aid and support of the Armed Forces of Ukraine and the Territorial Defence Forces.

On 25 May 2022, Akhmetov told Novoe Vremya that he was planning to sue the Russian Federation demanding "proper compensation for all losses and lost business", which, according to him, has caused him a loss ranging from 17 billion to 20 billion US dollars. From 24 February to 1 August 2022, they have donated almost US$90 million. As of 1 August 2022, the SCM businesses, the Rinat Akhmetov Foundation and the Shakhtar football club assisted in Ukraine, the military and civilians for ₴3 billion, or about $100 million. Assistance reached more than 11 million people across the country.

In June 2022, Akhmetov filed a lawsuit against the Russian Federation with the European Court of Human Rights for damages caused to his assets by Russia's military aggression against Ukraine, saying "this lawsuit is one of the first international legal steps against Russia to stop their ongoing crimes, destruction of the Ukrainian economy and the plundering of Ukrainian assets". It was reported that Akhmetov was suing for between $17 billion and $20 billion of losses.

In April 2023, Akhmetov stated that he would seek compensation for all the losses and damages caused by interference into the operations of his companies or expropriation of his assets and investments by the self-styled "Donetsk People's Republic" (DNR) and "Luhansk People's Republic" (LNR) controlled or guided by the Russian Federation in 2014–2017. The compensation will be used to help rebuild Ukraine.

In February 2026 Akhmetov's DTEK has announced that the US Court of Appeals for the D.C. Circuit has ruled unanimously in its favour, confirming that US courts have the legal jurisdiction to hear a case against Russia. The proceedings concern the unlawful seizure of DTEK's electricity assets in Crimea, Ukraine. This ruling permits DTEK's subsidiary, DTEK Krymenergo, to continue its legal pursuit in the United States to enforce an arbitration award valued at $300 million (UAH 11.4 billion.

Akhmetov has paid ₴1.77 billion in taxes to budgets of all levels since the beginning of 2022, according to Interfax-Ukraine.

As a result of massive combined (rockets and drones) attacks on 22 and 29 March 2024, DTEK lost 90% of its generating capacity.

As of April 2024 Akhmetov's DTEK thermal power plants were attacked 180 times since the beginning of the full-scale invasion. "As of today we have only 460 megawatts out of 5,000MW previously," DTEK chief executive Maxim Timchenko said to Financial Times in June 2024.

On 15 November 2023, it became known that starting from 24 February 2022, Akhmetov's companies sent more than 6.7 billion UAH (185 million euros) to the needs of the Armed Forces and the civilian population of Ukraine.

In May 2024, it became known that the Military Initiative "Steel Front" of Rinat Akhmetov announced the serial production of additional protective steel screens for tanks. Such screens were created specifically for the Soviet T-72, Ukrainian T-64 and the American M1 Abrams. After a long and thorough procedure of testing and testing, steel screens began to be supplied to the Armed Forces free of charge. So far, more than 25 additional protection systems have been manufactured and delivered, seven of which are for M1 Abrams tanks.

During two years of war, more than 12 thousand employees of SCM businesses joined the ranks of the Armed Forces of Ukraine. 846 workers (military and civilian) died, 97 people went missing, and 69 were captured.

In February 2026, media reported that Akhmetov transferred $200,000 to Ukrainian Olympian Vladyslav Heraskevych, who had been disqualified by the IOC from competing in the 2026 Olympics after appearing in a special "remembrance helmet" featuring artwork depicting Ukrainian athletes killed as a result of Russia's war. The amount is equivalent to the prize given to the nation's Olympic gold medallists.

The businessman said the funds were intended as support for the Ukrainian skeleton athlete in his fight for the right to remembrance and in defending Ukraine's interests on the international stage, while also supporting not only one athlete, but the entire team working towards results and representing Ukraine globally.

==== Assessment of Russia's actions ====
In an interview with Radio Svoboda in March 2022, Akhmetov said that the worst thing in Russia's war against Ukraine is that civilians are suffering and dying. And Russia's military aggression is a war crime and a crime against humanity against Ukraine and Ukrainians.

Asked by the Ekonomichna Pravda about Putin and Russia, Akhmetov said that "Russia is an aggressor and Putin is a war criminal. It's because Ukraine has always been a peaceful country, and has never attacked anyone."

In an interview with Forbes in March 2022 Akhmetov commented concerning Russian invasion of Ukraine: "What is unfolding here is a war crime and a crime against humanity, against Ukraine and the Ukrainians. This can neither be explained nor justified."

==== Vision of victory for Ukraine ====
In an interview with Forbes Ukraine, Akhmetov noted that the victory for Ukraine is "a complete ceasefire, the withdrawal of Russian soldiers from Ukraine and a full restoration of Ukraine's internationally recognized borders. Including Donbass and Crimea."

==== Plans on recovery of Ukraine ====
In a comment to Radio Svoboda, Akhmetov said he is confident that the time would come when Ukrainians would rebuild Ukraine, and stressed that he would personally invest all his strength and resources to restore Ukraine and become a prosperous country.

Akhmetov told The Guardian that: "My most important wish was always that Ukraine stays unified, free, democratic and thriving, and becomes a member state of the EU."

Akhmetov was asked by The Washington Post about his vision of Ukraine after the war, he called for a "new Marshall Plan" of hundreds of billions of dollars in investment and a country remade in the image of the West. "The goal is to build a new, strong, and European Ukraine, a member of the European Union, with strong institutions, the rule of law, clear anti-corruption rules, a democratic political system, and fair treatment of citizens," said Akhmetov.

In November 2024, DTEK stated that it would receive €62.8 million from the European Commission and US$46.1 million from the US government to rebuild the facilities destroyed by Russian attacks and prepare power plants for the upcoming winter.

In September 2025 in the interview to The Times, Metinvest CEO Yuriy Ryzhenkov told he is confident that Akhmetov will fund Ukraine's rebuild after the war. "I'm predicting that once it's all over, he will be focusing on investing into reconstructing Ukraine," says Ryzhenkov.

== Sports and patronage ==
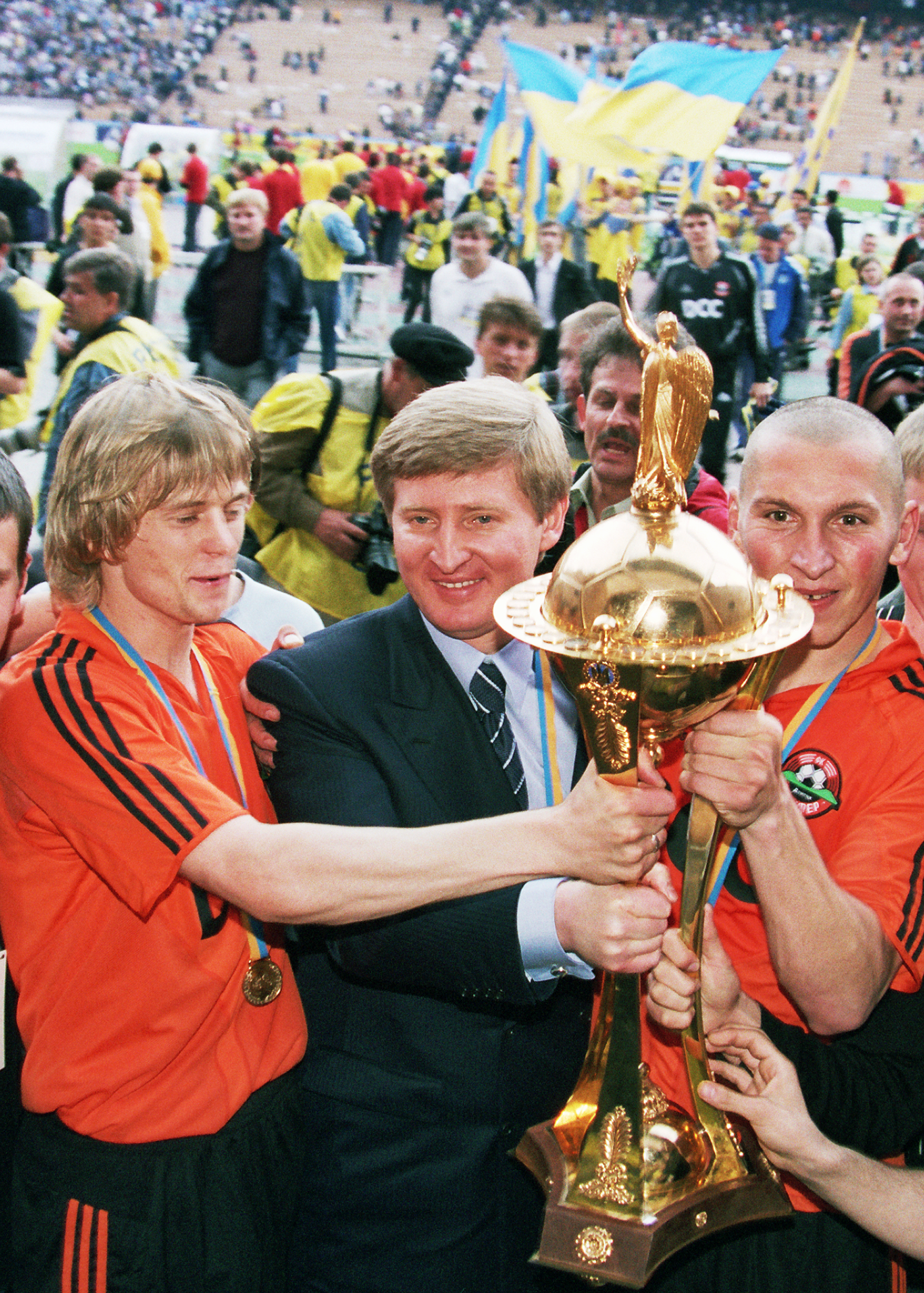
Akhmetov with players of FC Shakhtar Donetsk after the game (2002)

Following the October 1995 bombing assassination of former team president Akhat Bragin at the team's stadium, Akhmetov (who had served as Bragin's right-hand man and himself narrowly missed the attempt on his life), subsequently inherited operation of the Shakhtar Donetsk football club. On 11 October 1996, Akhmetov was appointed president of the team Rinat Akhmetov envisioned Shakhtar as a winner of European cups, so he began restructuring the club to achieve this goal. He changed the approach to the club management and transferred the operational management to the professionals. Under his leadership, FC Shakhtar became the country's champion fifteen times, won the Ukrainian Cup fifteen times, took the Ukrainian Super Cup nine times, and won the UEFA Europa League Cup for the first time in the history of Ukraine.

In 2009, Donbas Arena stadium was built in Donetsk at Rinat Akhmetov's initiative. It was the first stadium in Eastern Europe that was designed and built to the elite UEFA standards; its capacity is over 50,000 people. The venue was named the best stadium of Euro 2012. It ranks among 25 best stadiums in the history of the Champions League.

FC Shakhtar had to leave its home city of Donetsk due to the war in Donbas in Ukraine. Since the spring of 2014, its training base has been located in Kyiv. The team changed multiple home stadiums, moving to Lviv (Arena Lviv, 2014–2016), Kharkiv (Metalist, 2017–2020), and Kyiv (NSC Olimpiyskiy, since 2020). In the 2025/26 season, Shakhtar is playing its home matches at Arena Lviv. Since 2022, the club has played its European home fixtures abroad — in Warsaw, Hamburg, Gelsenkirchen, Ljubljana and Kraków.

After Shakhtar was forced to leave Donetsk in 2014 following the occupation of Donbas, Rinat Akhmetov decided not to attend the team's matches until it returned to Donbas Arena. He first spoke publicly about this decision in August 2015, explaining that it was an act of solidarity with the club's supporters, who had also lost the opportunity to watch their team play at its home stadium.

Shakhtar's last match at Donbas Arena was against Illichivets Mariupol on 2 May 2014. After that, Akhmetov did not attend another Shakhtar match until 9 April 2026, when he was present at the club's UEFA Conference League match against AZ Alkmaar – almost 12 years later.

In 2022, FC Shakhtar had to sign a stadium lease agreement with Legia Warsaw, because the Russia's war in Ukraine made it impossible to host international matches.

Shakhtar Donetsk's four-episode documentary series "Football Must Go On," produced by Paramount+, has won the prestigious Sports Emmy Award in the Documentary Series category.

Meanwhile, from August 2014 and until losing control of the stadium in 2017 the club's home stadium Donbas Arena served as a centre of humanitarian aid in Donetsk. Volunteers were unloading the food products, forming the individual sets and passing them to people in need there. During the fighting the Donbas Arena was seriously damaged as a result of shelling several times, the humanitarian aid distribution was continued.

In March 2017, a spokesperson for Akhmetov's foundation reported that humanitarian aid had been discontinued in the region after rebel organizations blocked access to the Shakhtar FC stadium, which serves as a center for relief efforts in the area.

In May 2025 the team won its 15th Cup of Ukraine.

== Personal life ==
Rinat Akhmetov is married to Liliya Nikolaievna Smirnova (born 1965), and has two sons with her, Damir (born 1988) and Almir (born 1997).

Akhmetov owns London's most expensive penthouse at One Hyde Park, which was originally purchased for a reported $213 million as a portfolio investment and spent another reported $120 million to fix them up. The information about the deal was disclosed only four years later, in April 2011, after the asset has shown a steady annual rise. In May 2013, the property was transferred from his company, SCM, to himself.

In 2019, Gruppo Campari sold Villa Les Cèdres in Cap Ferrat, France, to Akhmetov for €200 million.

In 2023, leaked documents revealed that Akhmetov bought a two-story penthouse in Belgravia, London, for approximately $122 million.

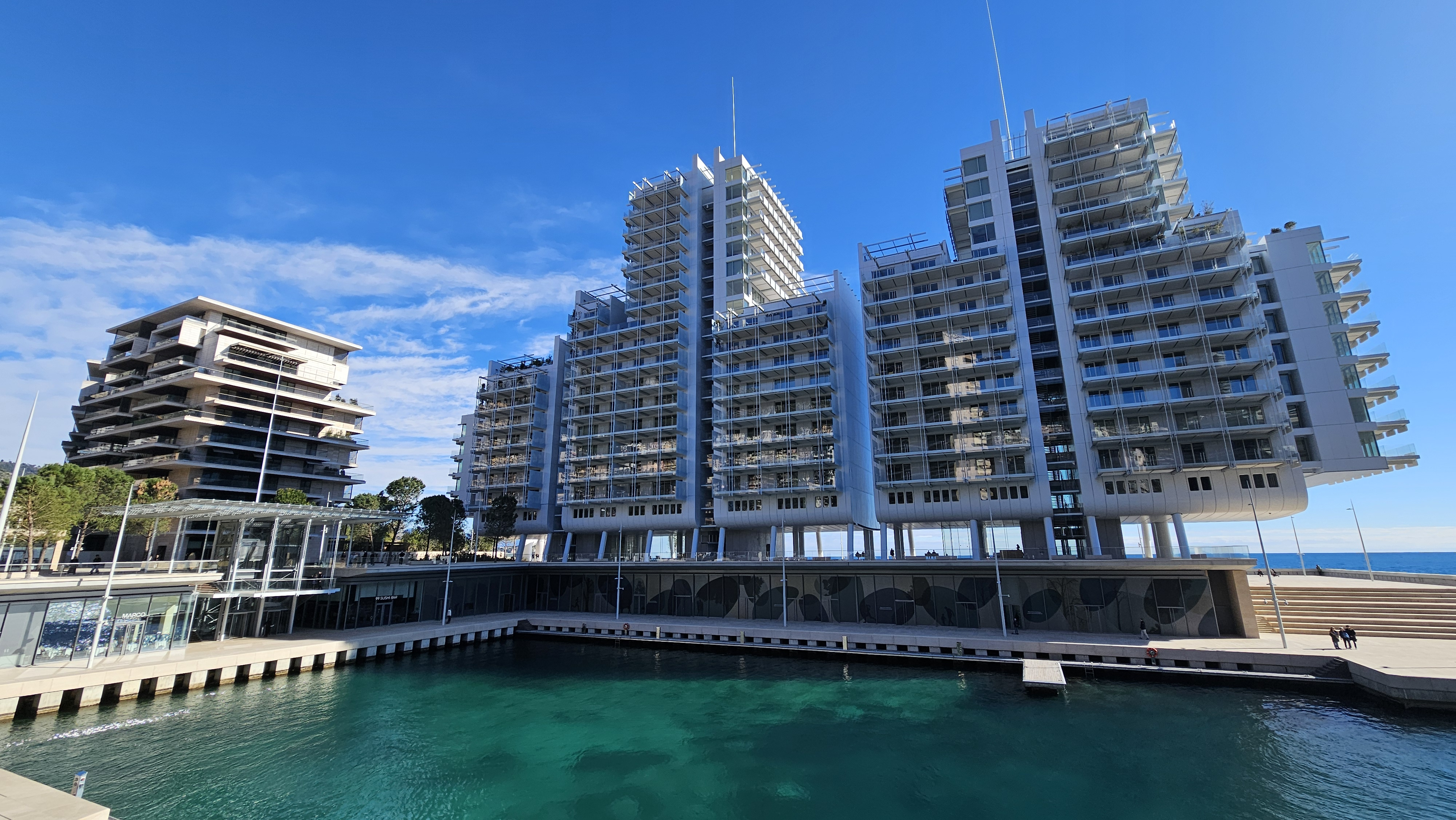
Monaco, "Le Renzo" building

In a sale completed in 2024, Akhmetov purchased a five-floor apartment with 21 rooms in the "Le Renzo" building in Monaco. It stretches over approximately 2,500 square meters (27,000 square feet), not counting balconies and terraces looking out over the Mediterranean Sea. It also has a private swimming pool, jacuzzi and comes with at least eight parking spots. The price was indicated to be €471 million ($554 million).

== Philanthropy ==
Researcher Natalya Kolosova believes that Rinat Akhmetov is one of the first modern Ukrainian philanthropists who switched from spontaneous aid to a systematic approach. Since 2006, Akhmetov has been among the leading philanthropists of Ukraine. According to various sources, he is among the first in terms of the amount of funds allocated to charity.

In 2005, on the initiative of Rinat Akhmetov, the SCM corporate charitable foundation Development of Ukraine was created (since 2018, the Rinat Akhmetov Foundation). Its main areas of activity include: national health, family, targeted assistance, dynamic culture, and modern education. Since March 2008, the fund has been separated from the company and operates as a personal charitable foundation of Rinat Akhmetov, it maintains a partnership with SCM. This Foundation is one of the most famous charitable organizations in Ukraine.

During 2007–2013 there was the Foundation for Effective Governance founded by Rinat Akhmetov. The organization was supporting the authorities and civil society institutions of Ukraine in the development of programs for the long-term economic development of the state. During its work, the Foundation was preparing The Ukraine Competitiveness Report for the World Economic Forum and created two clusters in Lviv (IT and woodworking).

In August 2014, on the basis of the Foundation for Development of Ukraine, Rinat Akhmetov Humanitarian Center Pomozhem was created, which provides humanitarian assistance in the form of food packages, medicines, and psychological assistance to citizens. More than 800 thousand people received 12-kilogram packages every month. For three years, the Humanitarian Center saved more than 1,139,000 people from death, hunger and disease in eastern Ukraine and became the largest humanitarian mission in the country. More than 39 thousand people were evacuated from the combat zone by the resources of this organization. Since February 2017, the Humanitarian Center has been working only on the territory controlled by Ukraine. In the Donetsk region, the Humanitarian Center is one of the most famous charitable organizations (2018).

On 28 February 2018, the assistance the Rinat Akhmetov Humanitarian Center provided in the non-government controlled territory was put on hold and later banned at all. Over 500,000 people could not receive assistance any more. In 2020, help expanded its support to the entire country and forwarded its resources to help all residents of Ukraine, in order to protect them from the threat of the COVID-19 epidemic.

Starting from the year 2000, Rinat Akhmetov and his friend Igor Krutoy have been involved in a charity campaign on Saint Nicholas' Day in Donetsk and Donetsk Oblast, visiting children deprived of parental care, orphans and children in hospitals. In 2012, he donated $19 million to build an oncology research center.

According to Akhmetov's spokeswoman, Olena Dovzhenko, Akhmetov' salary for being a member of Ukraine's Verkhovna Rada (parliament) was traditionally deferred to charity.

In 2019, Ukrainian hospitals received 200 ambulances.

In March 2020, Rinat Akhmetov began to financially help in the fight against COVID-19. After meeting with the president of Ukraine Volodymyr Zelenskyy, he began to oversee a number of regions (Donetsk, Ivano-Frankivsk, Luhansk and Lviv Oblast) and individual cities (Kryvyi Rih).

In February 2020, Akhmetov allocated ₴300 million to fight the coronavirus. About ₴500 million was allocated in total to fight the coronavirus within the framework of the Fight against COVID-19 in Ukraine project – part of the Rinat Akhmetov – Saving Lives program, its Foundation purchased over 200 ventilators for Ukrainian hospitals.

At the end of March 2026, businessman Rinat Akhmetov met with the supervisory board of his charitable foundation in Kyiv. Reports following the meeting stated that the Foundation had begun developing a new ten-year strategy focused on sport, children and young people, alongside support for veterans, remembrance, recovery and education.

== Controversies ==
=== Euromaidan ===
During the 2013–14 Euromaidan anti-government protests, Akhmetov became a target of protest as he was seen as a symbol of oppression. In December 2013 protesters picketed his residence in London on several occasions, urging him to cut ties with incumbent president Viktor Yanukovych. In response, Akhmetov issued a statement condemning police brutality. On 31 December, Akhmetov reprimanded a group of protesters in public near his home in Donetsk.

Following the Euromaidan Revolution and Donbas War, Akhmetov lost more than half of his wealth. His net value went down from $11.2 billion to $2.9 billion in 2017. News reports suggest that much of his former wealth has been redistributed to Russian oligarchs.

=== Disputes in the media ===
When dealing with public criticism and allegations concerning his past, Akhmetov has utilized a team of PR consultants and lawyers to protect his image and name. His team often contests reports on him that they consider to be libelous, scandalous, or inaccurate. Critics accuse Akhmetov of going beyond protecting his name, but rather fear mongering investigative journalists. As many court cases occur in London for its lax free speech laws, critics accuse Akhmetov and his legal team of abuse of libel tourism. In January 2008, Akhmetov won a London libel court case "for damage to his reputation" for such claims, while several other statements about his "criminal past" have been retracted by the media.

In a statement issued by Akhmetov's lawyer Mark MacDougall, "Akhmetov has done a lot of work to protect his good name from false accusations, which might hurt the reputation of his family and business. As the result of it, many publications in Ukraine and other European countries had published retractions and apologies… [and] admitted that their claims are false. We think that these facts speak for themselves".

In 2007, the Kyiv Post, the primary English language daily newspaper in Ukraine, published an article relating to Akhmetov's business transactions relating to the Dniproenergo thermoelectric generator and the Kryvorizhstal steel mill. The newspaper published an apology stating that "on closer examination, we concluded these allegations relating to Mr. Akhmetov were untrue and have no basis in fact."

In 2007, the German language Swiss newspaper Neue Zürcher Zeitung ("NZZ") retracted defamatory statements from published earlier article regarding Akhmetov's early business career in the 1990s, noting that "there is no connection between Akhmetov … and organized crime in Ukraine" and "[t]he economic success of Akhmetov is not based by any means on criminally acquired starting capital."

In 2008, a judgment was obtained from the High Court of Justice in London after Obozrevatel, a Ukrainian language Internet publication refused to retract false and libelous statements alleging that Akhmetov was connected to criminal activity and violence. The Obozrevatel reporter (Tetiana Chornovol) interviewed his former classmates and neighbors, and delved into his early years. Following court pressure Obozrevatel issued an official apology stating: "The editorial hereby admits that there was unchecked and false information about Rinat Akhmetov present in the … articles … We hereby give our apologies to Rinat Akhmetov for the problems resulted from the above-mentioned publications." Tetiana Chornovol refused to issue an apology or acknowledge any wrongdoing.

The website GoLocalProv.com, based in Providence, Rhode Island, published in 2010 allegations that Akhmetov had ties to organized crime. Subsequently, PolitiFact engaged in a review of the allegations on GoLocalProv's site and disputed the sources on which they were based, stating that "key elements of the [GoLocalProv] story are false or unproven" and that the story presented "suspicions, suggestions, innuendo, and conspiracy theories" as fact. The GoLocalProv articles and audio shortly after their publishing were removed from the site. The publisher, Josh Fenton, explained that they disappeared for "technical reasons" and the radio station which aired the interview containing the allegations refused comment.

In 2010, the French daily newspaper Le Figaro issued a retraction of false allegations it published on 18 January 2010 regarding Akhmetov, due to a lack of evidence to support their claims, and issued an apology., 29 January 2010, "French newspaper issues apology to Ukrainian businessman Akhmetov for false report". Akhmetov's U.S. lawyer, Mark J. MacDougall, stated that "the editors and publisher of Le Figaro have acted responsibly in issuing a swift apology and correcting the false statements published about Mr. Akhmetov <...> Mr. Akhmetov values his reputation throughout Europe, and today's action by Le Figaro recognizes that Mr. Akhmetov's good name was put at risk when false accusations were published," he added. Le Figaro had claimed that Akhmetov was "a scandalous Ukrainian oligarch" and that he was "a bandit in the past".

In 2013, Akhmetov's legal representatives issued a press release in response to accusations in the media, which cited politicians and journalists, that implicated Akhmetov in the 1996 murder of Donetsk-based Ukrainian oligarch Yevhen Shcherban. The official statement stated that they "have not found any proof suggesting that Akhmetov was involved in Scherban's or other businessmen's killings. To be honest, some of the businessmen killed in the 1990s were Mr. Akhmetov's close friends."

=== Connection to Donald Trump's 2016 campaign ===
In January 2019, Paul Manafort's lawyers submitted a filing to the court, in response to the Robert Mueller Special Counsel's accusation that Manafort had lied to investigators while supposedly co-operating with the investigation. Through an error in redacting, the document accidentally revealed that while Manafort was Donald Trump's campaign chairman, Manafort met with Konstantin Kilimnik, gave Kilimnik polling data related to Donald Trump's 2016 United States Presidential campaign, and discussed a Ukraine-Russia peace plan for the Russo-Ukrainian War with Kilimnik. As a Russian Main Intelligence Directorate GRU agent, Konstantin Kilimnik is a known member of Russia's intelligence community. (Note: Manafort has rejected questions about whether Kilimnik, with whom he consulted regularly, might be in league with Russian intelligence. According to Yuri Shvets, Kilimnik previously worked for the GRU, and every bit of information about Kilimnik's work with Manafort went directly to Russian intelligence.) Although most of the polling data was reportedly public, some was private Trump campaign polling data managed by Brad Parscale. (Note: Eric Trump's wife, Lara (née Yunaska) Trump, was the liaison between Donald Trump's 2016 presidential campaign headquarters in Trump Tower and Brad Parscale's Giles-Parscale company.) Manafort asked Kilimnik to pass the data to Ukrainians Serhiy Lyovochkin and Rinat Akhmetov. Rinat Akhmetov said in a statement to CNN that allegations of contacts with Manafort and Konstantin Kilimnik were "false" and that Manafort's work for Akhmetov's System Capital Management (SCM) ended over a decade ago.

== Awards ==
- UEFA chief Aleksander Čeferin presented Rinat Akhmetov the UEFA Football Leadership Award to mark Shakhtar's achievements during 25 years of his presidency and in the year of the club's 85th anniversary (2021).
- Order of Prince Yaroslav the Wise of the V class (2010)
- Full Chevalier of Order of Merit: I class in 2006, II class in 2004, III class in 2002
- Full Chevalier of the Miner's Glory Medal
- Honoured Worker of fitness and sports of Ukraine (1999)
- Award from President of Pakistan Sitara-e-Pakistan (2007) for merits to Pakistan
- Donetsk Citizens Recognition Prize in 2008 (est. by Donetsk City Council), in the nomination "Caring for the future"
- Honorary citizen of Donetsk (2006)
- On October 14, 2026, Akhmetov received an award from the Ukrainian Association of Football (UAF). Andriy Shevchenko personally presented him with the UAF’s highest honor, the Football Legend award, in London ahead of a match against AEK.

== See also ==
- Viktor Pinchuk
- Leonid Kuchma
- FC Shakhtar Donetsk
- Donbass Arena
- Timeline of investigations into Trump and Russia (2019)
- 2006 Ukrainian parliamentary election
- 2007 Ukrainian parliamentary election
