= ESTA Holding =

- Formerly: SCM Estate
- Company type: Subsidiary
- Industry: Real estate
- Founded: 2006; 19 years ago in Donetsk
- Headquarters: Kyiv, Ukraine
- Key people: Yulia Basistaya (CEO)
- Parent: System Capital Management
- Website: www.estaholding.com

ESTA Holding, formerly SCM Estate, is a wholly owned subsidiary of the Ukrainian financial and industrial holding company System Capital Management (SCM). ESTA is headquartered in Kyiv. Since 2018, its CEO has been Yulia Basistaya. Founded in 2006, the company is responsible for managing real estate assets in Ukraine; its business activities include investment, development of commercial and industrial properties, and hospitality.

== Portfolio ==
- TSUM Kyiv, Kyiv
- Leonardo Business Centre, Kyiv
- Europe Plaza Business Centre
- Pushkinskiy Business Centre
- Opera Hotel, Kyiv
- Donbass Palace, Kyiv
- Park Inn by Radisson, Donetsk

== See also ==
- SCM Holdings
- The Leading Hotels of the World
