= UMG (disambiguation) =

UMG most commonly refers to Universal Music Group.

UMG or umg may also refer to:

- Galician Youth Union (Galician: Unión da Mocidade Galega) the youth wing of the Galician People's Union, a Spanish political party.
- Macau-Guangdong Union (Chinese: 澳粵同盟; Portuguese: União de Macau-Guangdong), a political party in Macao
- Morrobolam language (ISO 639-3 code: umg), an Australian Aboriginal language
- UMG (TV series) a Thai science fiction romance
- United Minerals Group, the former name of umgi, a Ukrainian private equity firm
- Universidad Mariano Gálvez, a private university in Guatemala City
- University Medical Centre Göttingen (German: Universitätsmedizin Göttingen), part of the University of Göttingen
- Uttangal Mangalam railway station, a railway station in Tamil Nadu, India (station code: UMG). See List of railway stations in India § U
