= Dongorbank =

- Company type: Public Joint Stock Company
- Industry: Financial services
- Founded: April 6, 1992; 33 years ago
- Founder: National Bank of Ukraine
- Defunct: 2011
- Fate: Merged
- Successor: First Ukrainian International Bank
- Headquarters: Donetsk, Ukraine
- Area served: Ukraine
- Products: Banking services
- Website: www.dongorbank.com

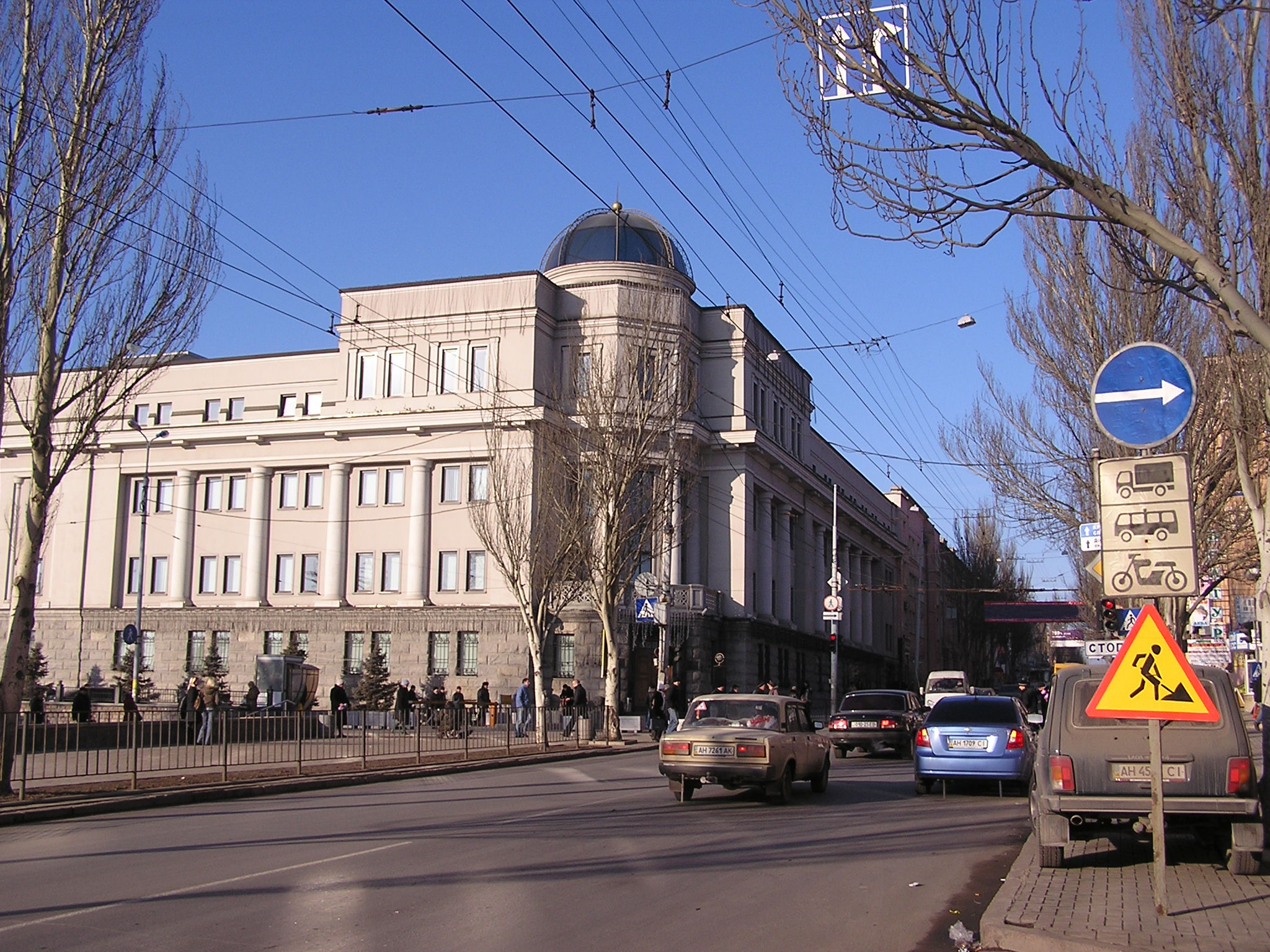
Façade of the bank building

Dongorbank was a Ukrainian bank headquartered in Donetsk in eastern Ukraine that was acquired by First Ukrainian International Bank (FUIB) in 2010.

== History ==
The bank was established with the National Bank of Ukraine as Donetsk Joint Stock Bank Aktseptbank on 6 April 1992. In July 1995 the bank was renamed into Donetsk Joint Stock Bank DONGORBANK by the decision of the general meeting of shareholders.

In December 2010, Central bank of Ukraine approved a reorganization plan through Dongorbank's joining the FUIB - the First International Bank of Ukraine, which was endorsed by an order of a single shareholder - SCM Finance Limited. On July 16, 2011, a consolidation of First Ukrainian International Bank (FUIB) and Dongorbank was completed and starting from July 18 the combined bank actives work under a joint brand FUIB.

Before the merger, as of 1 June 2010 in the overall ranking of Ukrainian banks Dongorbank ranked:

- 23rd by the size of assets with ₴8.797m
- 26th by the size of shareholders' equity with ₴1.058m;
- 23rd by the volume of retail deposits with ₴2.491m;
- 15th by the size of deposits held by corporations with ₴2.977m.

The Bank major shareholder was SCM Finance LLC (99.99% of the share capital). The bank's regional network consisted of 54 sub-branches.
