= First Ukrainian International Bank =

Ukrainian bank (founded 1991)

- Trade name: ПУМБ
- Native name: ПАТ 'Перший Український Міжнародний Банк'
- Romanized name: Pershyi Ukrainskyi Mizhnarodnyi Bank
- Industry: Finance and insurance
- Founded: 1991
- Headquarters: Kyiv, Ukraine
- Key people: Sergey Chernenko, Board Chairman
- Net income: ▲$56 mil (2011, IFRS)
- Total assets: ▲$3700 mil (2011, IFRS)
- Total equity: ▲$605 mil (2011, IFRS)
- Owner: Rinat Akhmetov
- Number of employees: 3,899 people
- Parent: SCM Finance LLC (92,3423%); SCM Holdings Limited (7,6577%)
- Website: pumb.ua/en

The First Ukrainian International Bank (FUIB, Ukrainian: ПАТ "Перший Український Міжнародний Банк", romanized: PAT 'Pershyi Ukrainskyi Mizhnarodnyi Bank', PUMB) is one of the leading banks in Ukraine, primarily owned by the oligarch Rinat Akhmetov through SCM Holdings. Established in 1991, the bank is headquartered in Kyiv. In early 2024, it was confirmed by the National Bank of Ukraine as one of the country's systemically important banks.

As of January 1, 2018, FUIB served 1.2 million private clients and more than 40,000 corporate clients.

== History ==
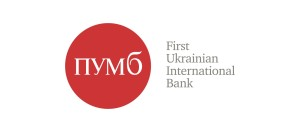
Former First Ukrainian International Bank logo, used since 2006 to 2024

The First Ukrainian International Bank was founded on 20 November 1991, registered with the National Bank of Ukraine on 23 December 1991. It commenced its banking operations in April 1992. In 1995 the Bank initiated its collaboration with the European Bank for Reconstruction and Development (the “EBRD”) followed by a partnership with Deutsche Investitions-und Entwicklungsgesellschaft MbH (“DEG”) in 1996. In 1999, DEG, EBRD and the International Finance Corporation (“IFC”) each became shareholders with a 10% holding. In 2000 Fortis Bank became a shareholder as the legal successor of Bank Mees & Hope N.V. The bank was among the first Ukrainian bank to institute IFRS financial reporting (in 1991) and to obtain a credit rating from an international credit rating agency (Fitch in 1998).

FUIB has been a principal member of payment systems Visa since 1996 and Mastercard International since 1993. It is also a regular participant of the State Retail Deposit Insurance Fund. In January 2022, the bank plans to launch a SWIFT payment service to a broker in the United States to buy/sell securities on the US stock market in collaboration with a partner company, as stated by Oleksandr Shcherbakha, the Director of the Bank's Retail Sales and Development Department.

In 2014, FUIB absorbed Renaissance Capital Bank, another Ukrainian bank also controlled by Rinat Akhmetov.

== Shareholders ==
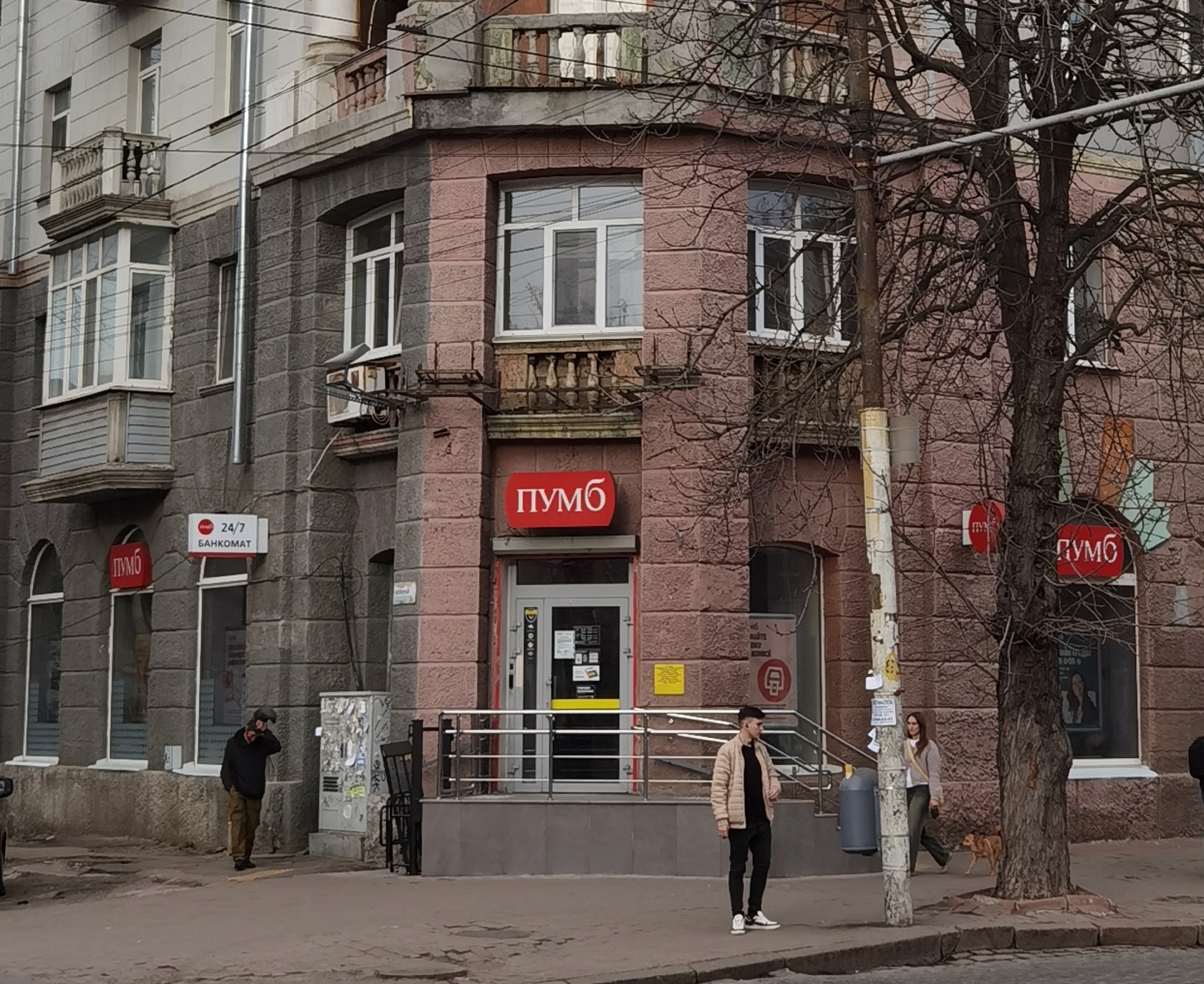
Branch in Dnipro

The controlling shareholder of FUIB is SCM Finance, which is associated with Rinat Akhmetov and holds 92.24% of the bank's shares. SCM Finance is fully owned by SCM Group. FUIB holds nostro accounts with 37 banks, while 61 banks hold vostro accounts with FUIB.

== General info ==
As of March 2012, FUIB held a stable rating from Moody's. The bank operates through 168 outlets across Ukraine. FUIB has been a member of various organizations, including the Society for Worldwide Interbank Financial Telecommunication (“SWIFT”) since 1993. In 2001 the Bank joined the Ukrainian First Stock Trading System (PFTS). In December 2010 Central bank of Ukraine approved a reorganization plan for Dongorbank by merging the two banks and incorporating Dongorbank into FUIB. On July 16, 2011, a consolidation of First Ukrainian International Bank (FUIB) and Dongorbank was finalized, and the combined bank's operations commenced under the joint brand FUIB.

== Controversy ==
According to Serhiy Leshchenko in 2017, both Phil Griffin and Leonid Avrashov (Ukrainian: Леонід Аврашов), who are associates of Paul Manafort, had credit cards with First Ukrainian International Bank. Leonid Avrashov had previously headed Black, Manafort, Stone and Kelly's Saint Petersburg office, as noted by Mustafa Nayyem in 2007. However, on September 2, 2014, Manafort claimed that Avrashov was associated with the International Republican Institute.

== See also ==
- List of banks in Ukraine
