= Donbass Palace =

5-star hotel in Donetsk, Ukraine

Coordinates: 48°00′14″N 37°48′14″E

Donbass Palace (Russian: Донбасс Палас) or Donbas Palace (Ukrainian: Донбас Палас) is the first 5-star hotel in Donetsk, Ukraine. It is located along Artema St, 80, Donetsk in Donetsk Oblast.

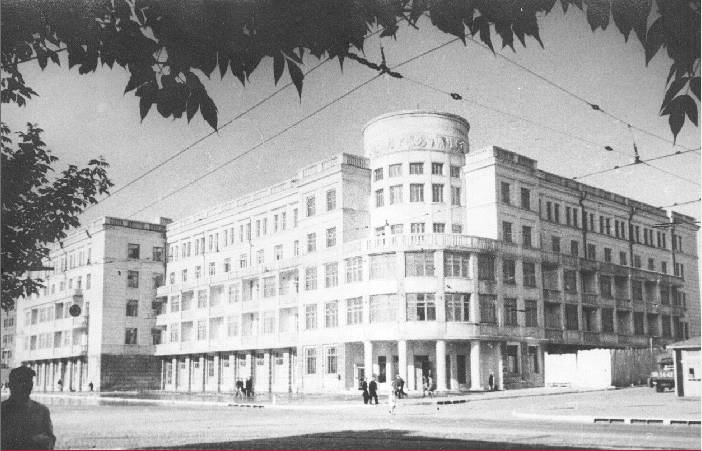
1938, construction completed

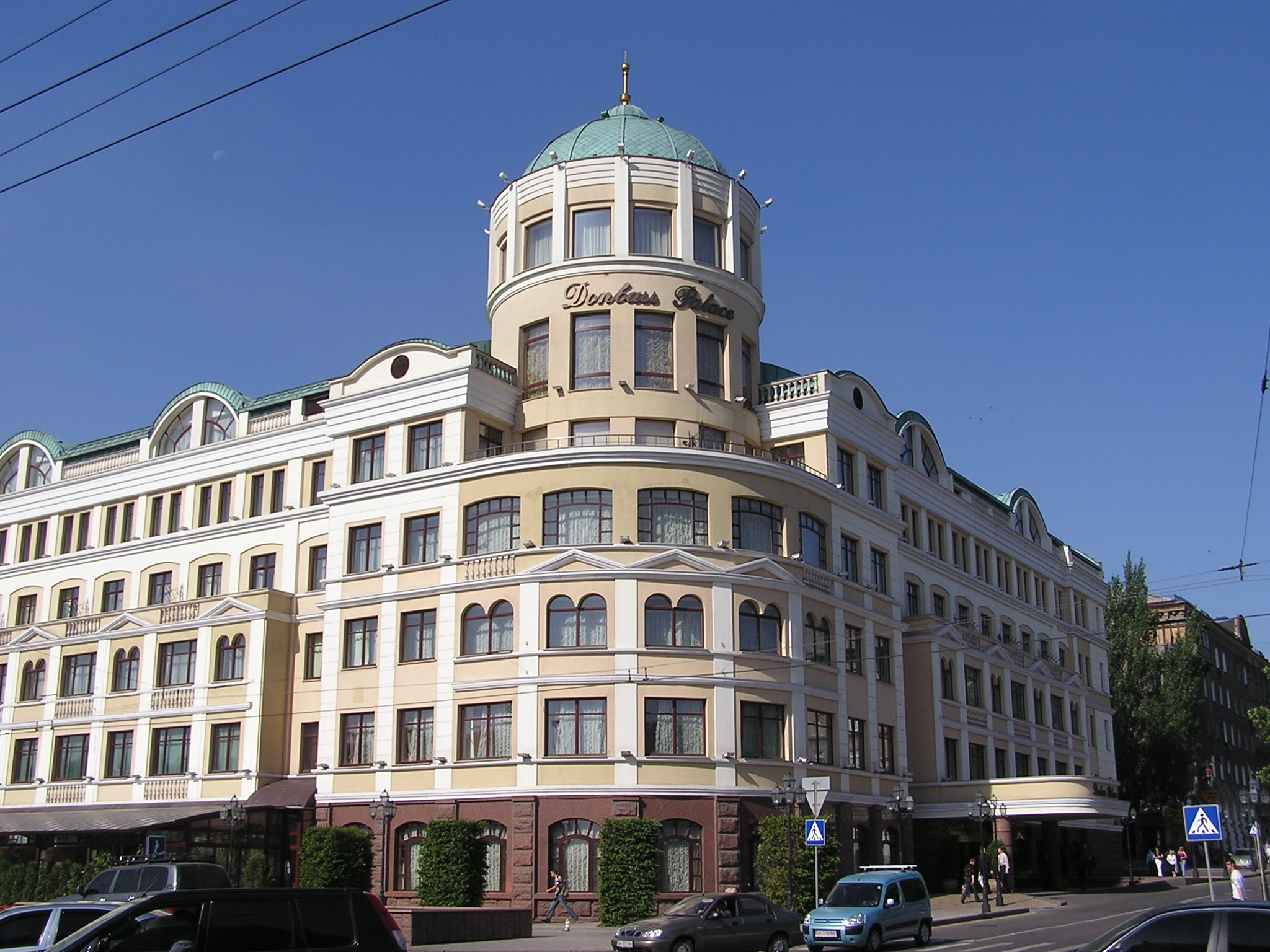
Donbas Palace, present view

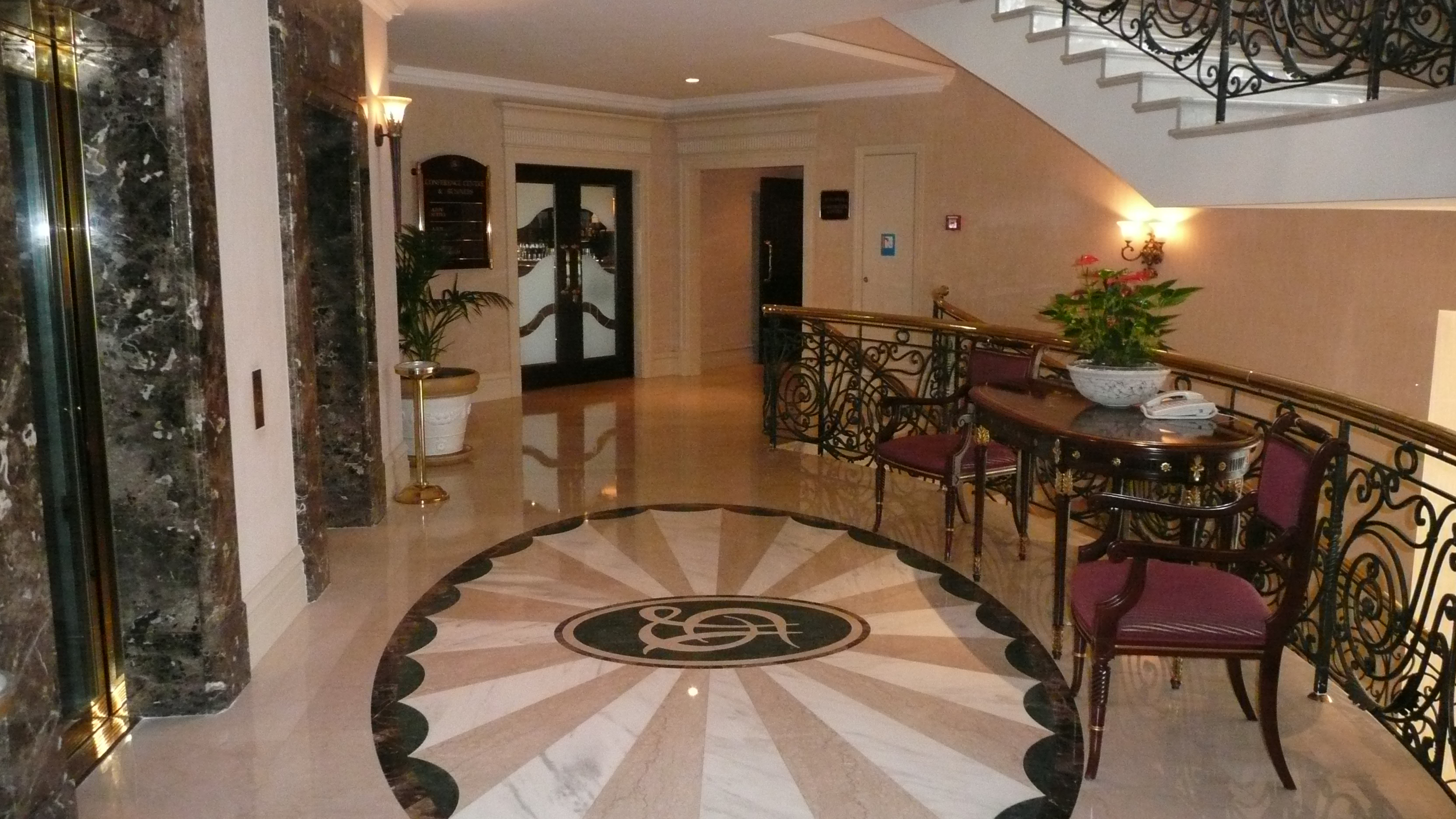
Donbas Palace, interior design

== History ==
Hotel "Donbass" was built in 1938 upon the plans of N. Rechanikov and A. Shuvalova. During the construction, the project was redesigned by N. Porkhunov. Panteley Tamurov supervised construction. During the Nazi occupation of Donetsk, the Gestapo was headquartered in the hotel; the building was partially destroyed during the war.

From 1947 to 1949, the building was renovated, but the dome was not restored due to a lack of funds. In 1971, the Donbas National Academy of Civil Engineering and Architecture conducted restoration works.

The hotel was considered an architectural monument of the Donetsk region. On 26 February 2001, the old building was blown up. On 15 May 2004, the five star hotel "Donbas Palace" was opened. The new building differs slightly from the original. Currently, Donbas Palace is owned by ESTA Group, which operates the real estate business of System Capital Management group.

During the cornerstone laying in October 2001, Rinat Akhmetov buried a time capsule.

In 2008, Donbass Palace served as the backdrop for the screen adaptation of Dmitry Gerasimov's novel "Cross in the Circle"

In 2009, Donetsk journalist Yevgeniy Yasenov published a book named Donbass Palace dedicated to the 5-year anniversary of the hotel.

== Facilities ==
Donbas Palace is located in the centre of Donetsk near the Drama Theatre, the Opera House and commercial areas. The hotel offers 129 rooms, an indoor pool, spa-center, and fitness club. Donbas Palace Hotel has two a la carte restaurants, a lobby lounge and L'Opera Hall which serves as a concert hall or a ball room. For business meetings, the hotel provides a business centre and two conference halls.

== Awards and recognition ==
Donbas Palace is the first Ukrainian hotel to become a member of the LHW

13 November 2005 - “Ukraine’s Leading Hotel 2005”
20 September 2006 - “Ukraine’s Leading Hotel 2006” and “Ukraine’s Leading Business Hotel 2006”
