= Vega Telecommunications Group =

- Company type: PrJSC
- Industry: Telecommunications
- Founded: 1994
- Headquarters: Kyiv, Ukraine
- Key people: Sergey Skripnikov CEO
- Services: Fixed telephony, Fixed Internet via FTTB and GPON technology, Data, IP-telephony, IPTV, CCTV. Vodafone TV
- Number of employees: 600
- Website: www.vega.ua

Vega Telecommunications Group is a Ukrainian operator of fixed telephony, broadband Internet access and data transfer. It is part of the Vodafone Ukraine group.. The operational management of Vega Telecommunications Group is carried out by PJSC "Farlep-Invest".

== History ==
Vega Telecommunications Group appeared on the Ukrainian telecommunications market on October 15, 2008 through the merging of the largest Ukrainian telecommunications groups Farlep and Optima Telecom, as well as companies Ucomline, CSS, IP Telecom, Matrix, Vilcom and others.

The story of Vega Telecommunications Group started in 1994, when its major members were established, and later included into Farlep group in Odesa and Optima-Telecom in Dnipropetrovsk. Both companies had innovative technologies for that time, such as digital telephony.

By 2005, Optima-Telecom had had over 300 000 subscribers in 13 Ukrainian cities.

In 2005, Ukraine's leading financial and industrial group System Capital Management has acquired Farlep-Invest Holding and Optima Telecom, and consolidated these assets into Farlep-Optima group. From 2005 to 2008 SCM has acquired and successfully merged a number of assets, including companies CSS, IP Telecom, Matrix, Vilcom, and over 30 others.

In September 2021, Vodafone Ukraine Group closed the acquisition of 99.99% of shares in Farlep-Invest, which operates under the Vega brand.
