= Alex Lissitsa =

Ukrainian economist

Alex Lissitsa (born 23 April 1974) is a Ukrainian public figure, specializing in the agribusiness and food industry sectors of the economy. He currently serves as the president of the Ukrainian Agribusiness Club.

== Education ==
Lissitsa was born in the village of Telne, Koryukiv district, Chernihiv Oblast. He holds a master's degree in enterprise economics from the National University of Life and Environmental Sciences of Ukraine and a Ph.D. in Agricultural Economics from Humboldt University of Berlin. Lissitsa has also conducted post-doctoral research at the School of Economics, University of Queensland (Brisbane, Australia) and Iowa State University.

== Career ==
During his time at Humboldt University, Lissitsa worked as a research assistant. After completing his studies, he was invited to work as a leading researcher at the Institute of Agrarian Development of Central and Eastern Europe in Halle, Germany.

In 2006–2007, Lissitsa held the position of General Director of the Ukrainian Agrarian Confederation Association. He went on to found and lead the Ukrainian Agribusiness Club in 2007.

From 2009 to 2011, Lissitsa served as a non-executive director of Agroton Group, one of Ukraine's largest agricultural producers.

Lissitsa has also been an adviser to the Minister of Agrarian Policy of Ukraine, Yuriy Melnyk, as well as the Committee on Agrarian Policy and Land Relations of the Verkhovna Rada of Ukraine.

In 2012, he held a non-executive director position at the Industrial Dairy Company (IMC). Since May 2013, Lissitsa has been the General Director of the Industrial Dairy Company (IMC).

Lissitsa currently serves as the chairman of the Board of the Ukrainian Center for European Policy and the Chairman of the Council for Agrarian Education at the Ministry of Education and Science of Ukraine since 2017. He is also a member of the Board of Directors of the Ukrainian Corporate Governance Academy.

Since 2019, Lissitsa has been actively developing the "Agrokebety" program, a multi-disciplinary specialist training program based on the Faculty of Agrarian Management at the National University of Life and Environmental Sciences of Ukraine, which provides a state-recognized degree.

In the early parliamentary elections to the Verkhovna Rada of Ukraine on 21 July 2019, Lissitsa was a candidate for People's Deputies of the party "Ukrainian Strategy of Groysman" and was listed as No. 15. He ran as a non-partisan candidate.

On 18 December 2020, Lissitsa was elected co-chair of the Eastern European Committee DLG (Germany).

In June 2021, he became an ambassador of the economic direction of the UN General Assembly in Ukraine.

Lissitsa, together with former Cabinet Minister Dmytro Dubilet, created an online land sale platform called dobrozem.com.ua.

== Education ==
In terms of recognition, Lissitsa won the grand prize at a prestigious competition organized by the Konrad Adenauer Foundation in 2000. He has been acknowledged as the best top manager in the agricultural industry by Landlord magazine. Additionally, he was the recipient of the 2020 Agro Champions Award in the category of Mentor of the Year.

== Publications ==
Lisitsa is the author of 40 scientific publications in Ukrainian, German, English and Russian.

Some of the publications:

- Lissitsa, Alexej & Rungsuriyawiboon, Supawat, 2006. Agricultural productivity growth in the European Union and transition countries (eng.)
- Lissitsa, Alexej & Odening, Martin, 2001. Effizienz und totale Faktorproduktivität in der ukrainischen Landwirtschaft im Transformationsprozess (deu.)
- Лисситса, Алексей 2006. Единая аграрная политика Европейского Союза: путь становления и принципы функционирования (rus.)
- In May 2024, he published a book titled "Meine wilde Nation: Die Ukraine zwischen Freiheit und Krieg", dedicated to modern Ukraine and its struggle for freedom during the Russian-Ukrainian war.

The author of a textbook for students "50 questions and answers about agriculture".
