= Ukrainian Agribusiness Club =

Ukrainian organization

Association Ukrainian Agribusiness Club (Ukrainian: Український Клуб Аграрного Бізнесу), also UCAB, is a Kyiv-based Ukrainian non-governmental organization, lobbying agribusiness interests. Dr. Alex Lissitsa serves as a president of UCAB.

The main UCAB activities include:

- Training and research
- Lobbying
- Work with media
- Participation and organization of trade fairs and exhibitions

Since its formation in 2007, Ukrainian Agribusiness Club quickly became the most quoted organization in the agricultural sector of Ukrainian economy.
