= Lemtrans =

Ukrainian rail freight company

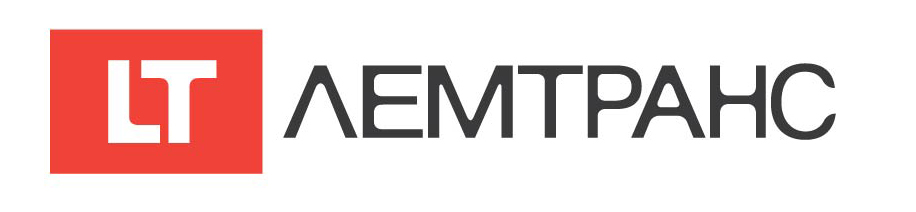
Company logo

Lemtrans is a private operator of railway rolling stock in Ukraine. The company owns over 15,000 gondola cars (open wagons), which transport over 52 million tons of cargo annually. It is fully owned by SCM Holdings. Lemtrans is a member of the International Federation of Freight Forwarders Associations and the European Business Association.

In 2017 the company signed a three-year cooperation agreement with its SCM Holdings sister company Metinvest, a steel and mining company.

In 2017 the head of Lemtrans, Volodymyr Mezentsev, explained that due to the War in Donbass, the company had control of 18,000 low-sided cars, with the other ones being blocked at the "ATO area". Despite the war conditions in the eastern areas of Ukraine, according to its reports Lemtrans had increased its cargo transportation in 2015 by over 13%.

Lemtrans carries out repair of rolling stock at rented depots at Volnovakha in Donetsk Oblast and Kamianske in Dnipropetrovsk Oblast. Early in the Russian invasion of Ukraine, fighting took place in Volnovakha, with Lemtrans's depot suffering major damage. In March 2022, Lemtrans lost control of the depot to the Russians, who tried to restart operations there.
