= HarvEast Holding =

Ukrainian agricultural company

Harveast Holding
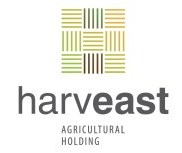
- Industry: Agriculture
- Founded: 2011 in Donetsk
- Headquarters: Donetsk, Ukraine
- Key people: Dmitriy Skornyakov (CEO)
- Revenue: 56,489,900 hryvnia (2025)
- Total assets: 703,561,800 hryvnia (2025)
- Website: http://harveast.com

HarvEast Holding is a Ukrainian agricultural holding established in March 2011 in Donetsk, Ukraine and owned by System Capital Management and Smart Holding groups.
In November 2011 HarvEast became a member of Ukrainian Agribusiness Club Association (UCAB).
HarvEast is one of the biggest agricultural companies in Ukraine, only in 2011 planning to invest ₴80 million in modernization of Ukrainian agricultural industry.
HarvEast is operating agricultural assets in the Crimea, Donetsk oblast and is primarily active in:

- crop farming with over 197 000 hectares land bank (wheat, sunflower, barley, perennial grasses, maize, fodder sorghum)
- livestock farming with over 17 500 heads of cattle (cattle, dairy farming, poultry)

CEO of HarvEast Holding is Dmytro Skornyakov.

According to the order of the Antimonopoly Committee of Ukraine, in 2018 the company acquired a stake in Agro-Holding MS LLC.

In 2021, the company announced the launch of a joint project with the Mariupol City Council to use urban wastewater to irrigate crops.

== See also ==
- Ukrainian Agribusiness Club
- System Capital Management
