= Opera Hotel =

Hotel in Kyiv, Ukraine

Coordinates: 50°26′53.0″N 30°30′00.2″E

Opera Hotel is the deluxe boutique hotel launched on 20 December 2006 in Kyiv, Ukraine.

The hotel is located in the center of Kyiv at the crossroads of the business, cultural and historical districts, not far from the Kyiv Opera and St Volodymyr's Cathedral. The hotel was built in 1906 and is an architectural monument.

In 2007, the Opera hotel was awarded “Europe's Leading New Business Hotel 2007” at the World Travel Awards in Newcastle, UK.

== Hotel infrastructure ==
The Opera hotel has 137 rooms in various sizes and styles, equipped with designer furniture. There are seven themed suites decorated to reflect atmosphere of the world famous opera compositions and various cultures: Japanese, Italian, Russian, Egyptian, French, American and Moroccan.

Conference services are provided by the Symphony Grand Hall, which accommodates up to 200 people.

== See also ==
- List of hotels in Ukraine § Kyiv
