= System Capital Management =

Ukrainian company

SCM Holdings
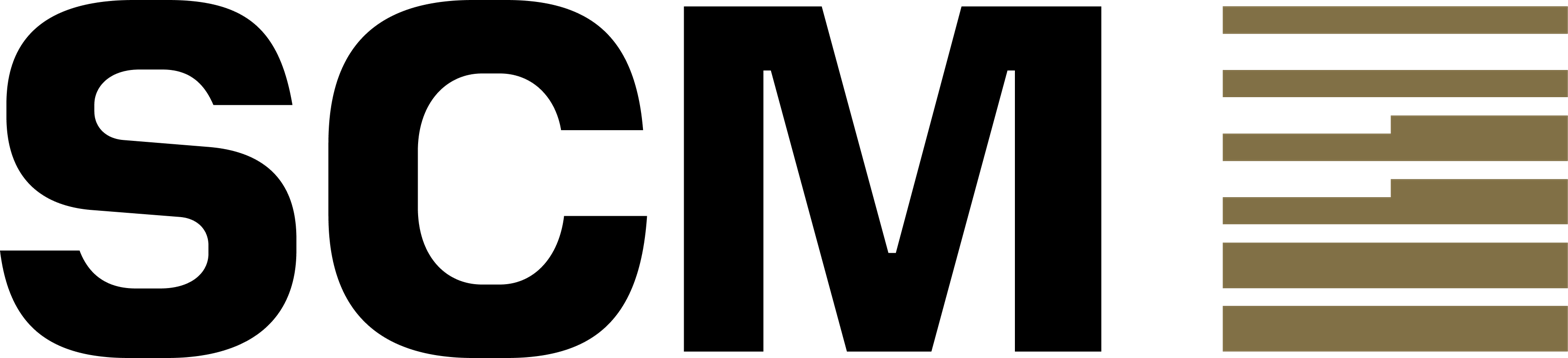
- Type: Private
- Industry: Holding
- Founded: 2000 in Donetsk
- Headquarters: Kyiv, Ukraine
- Key people: Rinat Akhmetov (owner); Angela Yatsenko (CEO)
- Revenue: ▲US$23.470 billion (2012)
- Total assets: ▲US$31 billion (2012)
- Owner: Rinat Akhmetov (100%)
- Number of employees: 150,000
- Subsidiaries: Metinvest; DTEK; ESTA Holding; Ukrtelecom umgi PUMB; HarvEast; Lemtrans
- Website: www.scm.global

System Capital Management (Ukrainian: Систем Кепітал Менеджмент) or SCM is a Ukrainian financial and industrial holding company established in 2000 in Donetsk, Ukraine. It is currently headquartered in Kyiv.

The company is Ukraine’s largest private-sector employer and taxpayer.

SCM’s portfolio includes more than 250 companies, across over 30 countries, employing approximately 150,000 people.

SCM’s portfolio businesses operate in energy, metals and mining, minerals, logistics, infrastructure, agriculture, telecommunications, real estate, finance and others. SCM develops large scale industrial facilities, with active development projects in a number of countries, including Italy, Poland, Croatia, and Romania.

In an interview with The Guardian in May 2026, Rinat Akhmetov noted: “First of all we decided to trade in coke and coal, earning fairly small money. It started piling up and we began buying minority stakes in industrial companies. Stakes in metallurgy plants were very cheap as there was no competition from western businesspeople to invest in Ukraine, and many locals wanted to take their money to the west.”

At the launch of the "Invest in Ukraine" initiative in September 2026, it was revealed that SCM had invested over $4.3 billion in the country since February 24, 2022, with approximately $1 billion of that amount going toward the restoration of facilities destroyed by the Russian Federation.

== Structure ==
The biggest company in the SCM Group is Metinvest, involved in the mining and steel business. It is one of Ukraine's largest private business and one of the biggest steel producers in Europe. It is also the largest Ukrainian producer of iron ore. In addition to Ukraine, Metinvest has assets in the US, Italy, UK, Bulgaria, and Switzerland.

DTEK, involved in electricity generation (both from thermal and renewable sources), distribution and customer service. As of 2025, DTEK has invested $1.2 billion in renewable energy, and has committed €450 million to the expansion of its Tyligulska Wind Power Plant, which can power nearly one million homes in south-west Ukraine once live.

Ukrtelecom, the national telecommunications operator of Ukraine. In 2024 alone, nearly 7,000 kilometres of fibre-optic cable were installed, enabling over 3 million households to access modern digital services even amid the full-scale Russian invasion.

First Ukrainian International Bank (FUIB or PUMB/ПУМБ) is the largest privately owned bank in Ukraine. It is recognized as a systemically important bank by the National Bank of Ukraine (NBU). FUIB is also an authorized institution for safeguarding the NBU’s cash reserves. The bank serves 147,000 corporate clients and more than 1.9 million retail customers, offering a comprehensive range of financial services. According to the NBU, FUIB ranks among the top five banks in Ukraine by loan portfolio size, total assets, and client account balances.

Lemtrans Group is the largest transport and logistics group in Ukraine, providing freight transportation services by rail, road, and marine routes both within Ukraine and the European Union. The Group's companies operate a fleet of freight rolling stock and containers, car maintenance facilities and container terminals (agriculture, mining and other industries).

ESTA Holding, an established player in Ukraine’s commercial real estate sector, specialising in offices, shopping centres, and hotel properties. Notable assets include the Leonardo Business Centre and five-star Opera Hotel in Kyiv. In 2016, after four years of reconstruction, ESTA Holding reopened Kyiv Central Mall (TSUM) on the capital’s main thoroughfare - Khreshchatyk.

umgi, a private equity firm founded by SCM in 2006. umgi was established to develop industrial ventures both in Ukraine and internationally. umgi currently manages a portfolio of eight companies across Ukraine, Poland, Spain, Italy, Turkey, Romania, Serbia, and India. These assets operate in diverse sectors including the green economy, industrial goods and services, and mining. As of December 2024, the collective market value of businesses under umgi's management reached $500 million.

HarvEast Holding is a diversified agribusiness overseeing a land bank of 123,000 hectares in Kyiv, Zhytomyr, and the Ukraine-controlled territory of Donetsk region. Сrop production is a priority area of activity of HarvEast. The main crops are winter and spring cereals (wheat, corn, barley), sunflower, rapeseed, and niche crops.

== SCM operations amid Russian military invasion ==
On 22 February 2022, in the aftermath of the Russia's invasion into Ukraine, Akhmetov announced that the company was going to pay $34 million in taxes upfront to bolster Ukraine's treasury.

Shortly after Russia invaded Ukraine, Akhmetov stated that the company's goal in war conditions was to help Ukrainians withstand the invasion: "My Foundation is helping Ukrainians survive by providing water, food, medicines, and any help we can give here and now. SCM businesses are helping the army and territorial defence forces defend our sovereignty, our freedom and independence, and win the war," he stated. Akhmetov stated that SCM was using its international connections and opportunities to communicate to their international partners that Ukrainians were dying and suffering because of Russia's aggression: "What is unfolding here is a war crime and a crime against humanity, against Ukraine and the Ukrainians. This can neither be explained nor justified."

SCM itself and its businesses have been some of the largest corporate supporters of the Ukrainian population and military since the outbreak of the war. In 2022 alone, SCM companies paid UAH 73.2 billion in taxes (approximately US$2.7bn). SCM together with the Rinat Akhmetov Foundation have channeled over UAH 11.3 billion ($315 million) to help Ukraine.

This included the following assistance:

- Through Steel Front, distributed ammunition, vehicles, drones, thermal imagers, radios, armor, medical kits, fuel, and more to Ukrainian military units. For example, Steel Front has already provided over UAH 85 million in support to the 157th Brigade.
- Launched the "Heart of Azovstal" project, allocating UAH 1 billion (~$25 million) to support defenders of the city of Mariupol with housing, medical care, legal and social assistance.
- Launched the "Saving Lives" humanitarian mission, delivering food, hygiene kits and medicines to displaced civilians and frontline communities. In 2023, this project directed EUR 1.26 bn to projects on the ground, including delivering approximately 70,000 food kits.
- The football club "Shakhtar" also provides consistent humanitarian assistance, supporting Ukraine’s military, aiding displaced families, and supplying medical equipment to hospitals.

In addition to support from SCM itself and Rinat Akhmetov, SCM portfolio companies have also been leaders in supporting Ukraine: Metinvest has been a major pillar of Ukraine’s defence and humanitarian aid, contributing over UAH 8.4 billion (≈ US $225 million) across military, social, and economic fronts. The company provided free steel, armour plates, 150,000+ bulletproof vests, 25,000 helmets, and 679 mobile dugouts/command shelters. More than 8,000 employees serve in the military and are supplied with armour, winter gear, and mental‑health support. Metinvest is Ukraine’s top private donor, continuingly paying full taxes (UAH 19.8 billion in 2024), maintaining operations despite disrupted assets, and investing in post‑war reconstruction projects like "Steel Dream".

DTEK has committed over UAH 1 billion (~US $30–35 million) to military and humanitarian aid. DTEK has provided free power—valued at ~UAH 350 million—to over 100 critical infrastructure facilities including hospitals, military facilities, bakeries, and water treatment plants in Kyiv, Donetsk, and Dnipropetrovsk regions. DTEK’s crews restored power to millions of homes across frontline areas, investing UAH 300 million in grid restoration and repairing war‑damaged power plants.

Ukrtelecom allocated around UAH 50 million to the military, delivering nearly 3,000 tactical first-aid kits, 4,000 tourniquets and 2,000 hemostatic bandages. Ukrtelecom ensured access to communication services in about 90% of settlements that had been covered by its network before the full-scale invasion. The company also equipped 503 school bomb shelters with Wi‑Fi and reconnected numerous medical and educational institutions. It continues to restore connectivity after frequent nationwide cyberattacks.

Since the beginning of the full-scale invasion, the Lemtrans Group has allocated over UAH 43 million to support various projects. This assistance has included transfers to the special account of the National Bank of Ukraine, payment of logistics tariffs for the transportation of humanitarian aid, as well as the delivery of food to several regions across the country.

First Ukrainian International Bank has contributed over UAH 916 million (~US $22 million+) through social projects and direct military aid. FUIB initiated a social project, "We are of the same blood," to support Ukrainian soldiers and civilians with blood supplies. This is a large-scale partnership project, which has 45 partners, including public organizations, illustrators, brands, shops, exhibition organizers, and even a football club. During its existence, the initiative "We Are of the Same Blood" raised more than 10 million UAH. The funds were used for 92 blood deliveries to hot spots; more than 6.7 thousand tactical medicine products; and 61 kits for emergency paramedics. Altogether, saved more than 160,000 lives. Approximately 3000 Ukrainians became donors, which means hope for recovery for 9,000 people.

Since 2022, umgi has provided comprehensive military and humanitarian assistance totaling over UAH 36.7 million. Direct financial aid of UAH 16.8 million included the procurement and delivery of body armor, radios, thermal imagers, drones, generators, communication systems, anti-drone devices, and medical supplies for the Armed Forces.

In-kind contributions worth UAH 19.9 million covered machinery, transport, fuel, building materials, and technical support. DTEK coordinated evacuations, supported fortification and road construction, supplied electricity and water to military units, and provided direct aid to mobilised employees. Many initiatives were implemented in partnership with international donors, notably the U.S.-based Unity for Ukraine Foundation.

SCM's Metinvest and DTEK have joined efforts with the Rinat Akhmetov Foundation to launch the Saving Lives humanitarian project, which supplies food to IDPs as well as helps evacuate and accommodate people.

Metinvest, UMG Investments, DTEK and other SCM businesses have joined efforts to create a national and international network of carriers to supply humanitarian aid during wartime, the Logistics Front. The objective of the logistics network is to help people as well as towns and cities affected by the Russian invasion deliver food and essentials and support critical infrastructure facilities. The company calls for carriers to join the network and become logistics partners.

=== Assets affected as a result of Russian invasion ===
Luhansk TPP was shelled on 22 February 2022, on the eve of the Russian invasion, during the escalation in certain areas of Donetsk Region and Luhansk Region (CADLR). It was the major source of heat and power in those regions. DTEK noted that restoration works could be carried out only in case of ceasefire.

In his comments to The Wall Street Journal, Ahmetov, the owner of the two biggest Mariupol metallurgy plants, Azovstal Iron and Steel Works and Illich Steel and Iron Works, stated that both plants were under Ukrainian control but had been temporarily shut down. "Russian troops are turning Mariupol into rubble, killing Mariupol residents and bombing the plants," he said. "Under no circumstances will these plants operate under the Russian occupation."

On 13 March 2022, Metinvest Group's Avdiivka Coke Plant came under heavy shelling. The shells damaged two coke shops and some other facilities of the plant. No one was injured.

In February 2023, all of Akhmetov's assets in Russian occupied Donbas were confiscated. The local Russian-installed authorities stated as a reason for the seizure that Akhmetov was a "rogue individual."

During the Russian invasion, nearly 260 Ukrtelecom facilities were damaged, with around 50 of them completely destroyed. The most severe damage was suffered by network nodes in the Donetsk and Luhansk regions, as well as in Kharkiv, Zaporizhzhia, and Kherson.

Losses in the temporarily occupied territories have been estimated at more than UAH 700 million. The total destructive impact of Russian aggression on Ukrtelecom amounts to UAH 2.8 billion, primarily due to the economic devaluation of operational assets.

Due to the Russian invasion, HarvEast has lost control over approximately 150,000 hectares located within the Donetsk region. This conflict also resulted in the loss of two seed plants, five farms, a large volume of harvested crops and significant agricultural machinery.

=== Asset protection in courts ===
In 2018, a claim was already filed with the arbitration court in The Hague regarding DTEK’s energy assets in annexed Crimea.

In April 2023, arbitration was initiated regarding compensation by Russia for all losses caused as a result of interference in the activities or expropriation of assets and investments by the so-called “DPR” and “LPR” under Russian leadership or control in 2014-2017.

In November 2023, the International Court of Arbitration in The Hague fully satisfied DTEK’s claim against Russia for seized assets in illegally annexed Crimea. The arbitration awarded Russia damages in the amount of $267 million, including interest and legal costs as of the date of the decision. Interest will continue to accrue until the full amount of the damages is paid.

The Court of Appeals for the District of Columbia has confirmed that a US district court has jurisdiction to hear DTEK's motion to enforce an arbitration award in the amount of over $300 million for Russia's seizure of the company's Crimean assets, thus rejecting the Russian Federation's appeal. This became known on February 23, 2026.

== Awards and recognition ==
In September 2011, under USAID support, the Centre for Corporate Social Responsibility Development published the results of the first Ukraine's Companies' Transparency Index. The top ten list included three SCM Group companies: System Capital Management, Metinvest and DTEK, with DTEK as number one in the list. SCM Group prepared the first corporate social responsibility report in Ukraine in 2005.

On 1 December 2011, SCM was honored at the Business Leadership Roundtable and Corporate Social Responsibility Awards Luncheon held during Ukraine's 20th Anniversary of Independence Gala events in Washington, D.C. On 15 December 2011, SCM took the first place at the National CSR Business Case 2011 Contest for its Contemporary Education social programme.

At the beginning of 2012, Metinvest, DTEK and SCM took three first places at the ranking compiled by Gvardiya national ranking magazine as the most socially responsible businesses in Ukraine.

== See also ==
- Industrial Union of Donbas
- List of SCM Group subsidiaries
