= Umgi =

umgi
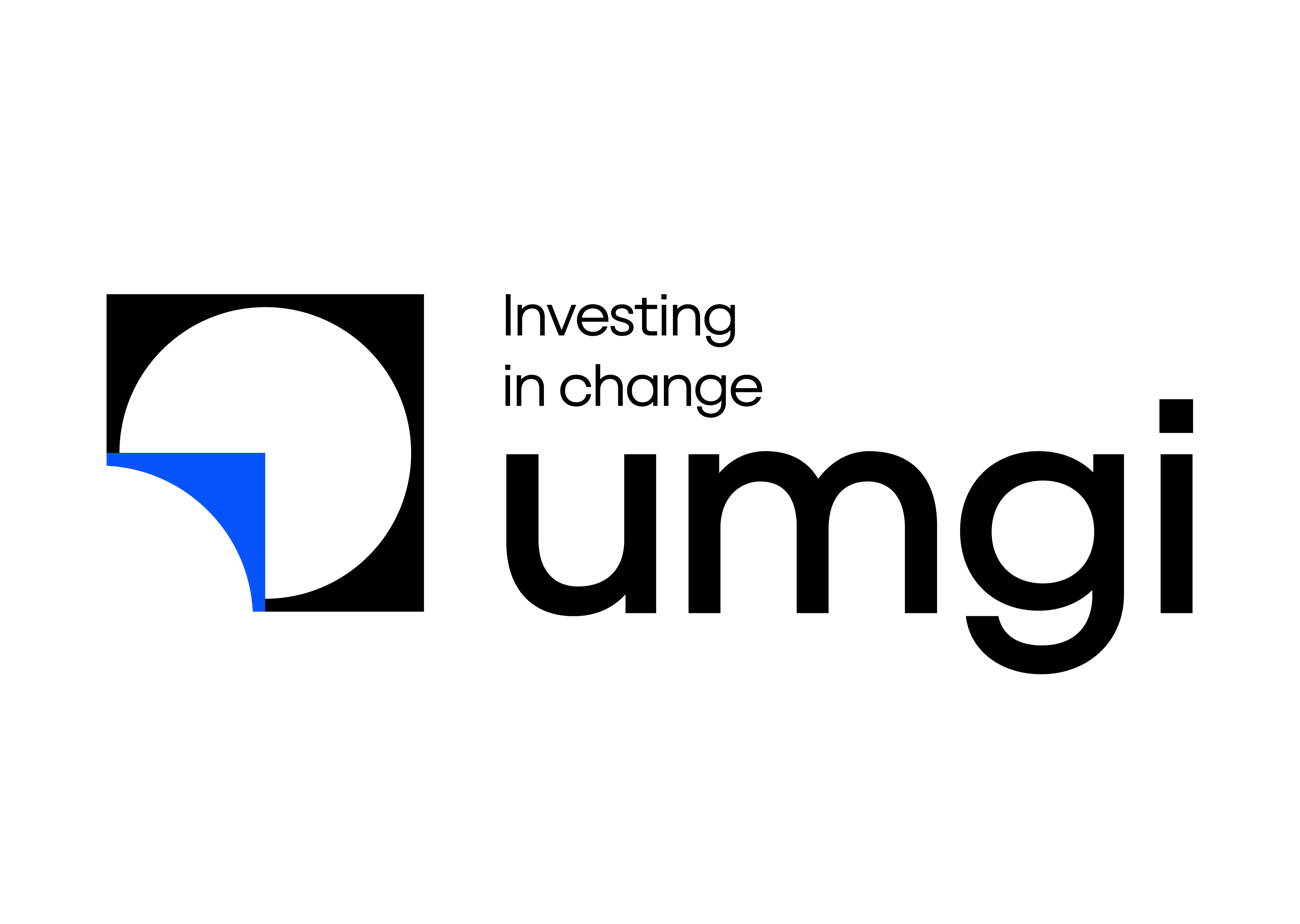
- Type: Private equity firm
- Industry: Investments
- Founded: 2006; 20 years ago
- Headquarters: Kyiv, Ukraine
- Key people: Andrii Gorokhov (CEO), Nadiia Kaznacheieva (CIO), Olena Shvedova (CLO), Dmytro Maistrenko (CFO), Serhii Melnychenko (COO)
- Number of employees: 20 (2025)
- Parent: System Capital Management
- Website: umgi.com

umgi is a private equity firm with an asset market valuation of US$500 million. It was founded in 2006 by the international investment company System Capital Management (SCM). umgi invests in mid-sized businesses to support their growth and enhance enterprise value. As of December 2024, its portfolio comprises eight assets across seven countries, with a strategic focus on the green economy, mineral extraction, industrial goods manufacturing, and industrial services.

umgi has offices in Kyiv, Warsaw, Cyprus, and Spain. It explores new business opportunities across Ukraine, the EU, Turkey and India, focusing on sectors such as waste management, industrial minerals, B2B manufacturing, healthcare, energy transition, and AI-enabling hardware.

== History ==
In 2006, the Ukrainian diversified group System Capital Management founded the industrial investment holding United Minerals Group (UMG) to manage SCM's clay mining enterprises.

By 2012, UMG added the flux and dolomite enterprises PJSC “Dokuchaievsk Flux and Dolomite Plant” (Ukrainian: ПрАТ «Докучаєвський флюсо-доломітний комбінат») and PJSC “Novotroitskoye Ore Mining” (Ukrainian: ПрАТ «Новотроїцьке рудоуправління»). In the same year, UMG launched a new business line for the commercialization of coal combustion by-products (ash and slag materials) from Ukrainian thermal power plants and invested in a greenfield project to establish a microsphere enrichment facility.

In 2013, UMG launched new business lines in mineral fertilizers and industrial logistics, founding INTECH.

In 2015, UMG expanded its operations by launching two new business lines: the wholesale and export of agricultural products, and the processing and sale of rare and technical gases. The following year, in 2016, the company established RTG, which now operates under the name ARNOX.

In 2016, UMG transitioned into a private equity firm, rebranding as UMG Investments. At the time, its portfolio included six assets based in Ukraine with a total business valuation of US$400 million.

In 2017, the company invested in a greenfield project to build a mineral fertilizer plant (Ukrainian Mineral Fertilizers (UMF); Ukrainian: Українські мінеральні добрива). That same year, UMG Investments entered the metallurgical by-product processing and commercialization sector. In 2017, its portfolio company INTECH became the management entity for UMG Investments’ assets in industrial goods manufacturing and industrial services. During this period, the company lost control on its dolomite mining business due to the occupation of parts of the Donetsk and Luhansk regions by Russian forces.

In 2018, UMG Investments expanded its industrial portfolio by acquiring the Ukrainian blasting services company PJSC “PVP Kryvbasvybukhprom” (Ukrainian: ПАТ «ПВП „Кривбасвибухпром“»). That year, UMG Investments consolidated its operations in thermal energy and metallurgical by-product processing into a new portfolio company, Recycling Solutions. It also made a strategic investment in a greenfield cogeneration project utilizing mine methane, known as REGEN.

In 2019, the value of assets managed by UMG Investments company exceeded USD 500 million.

In 2020, UMG Investments added one of Ukraine’s largest logistics operators, the Portinvest group of companies, to its portfolio. It also invested in a greenfield project to create the largest feed additives producer in Ukraine — Feednova. That same year, the metallurgy-related industrial goods business was separated into a new portfolio company called INWIRE.

In 2021, UMG Investments expanded its mining portfolio by acquiring a controlling stake in JSC “Chasiv Yar Refractory Plant” (Ukrainian: АТ «Часівоярський вогнетривкий комбінат»).

At the beginning of 2022, the value of assets under management reached US$1 billion. The company held 12 assets in Ukraine, Spain, and Italy. Later, it lost control of its limestone business due to the occupation of the territory by Russian forces.

In 2023, UMG Investments rebranded and changed its name to umgi.

As of 2025, umgi manages eight assets across seven countries: Ukraine, Poland, Spain, Italy, Turkey, Romania, and Serbia. Including its portfolio companies, umgi employs over 1,100 people. The group's green economy portfolio has been placed under the operational management of INTECH.

== Investment activity ==
umgi operates under a private equity model, investing in established mid-cap companies to drive growth through organic development or strategic consolidation. The firm maintains flexibility in its investment approach, taking either majority or minority equity positions. Typical investments range from $10 million to $30 million, though umgi is open to smaller commitments starting at $2 million and may exceed $30 million when appropriate. The primary objective is to enhance the value of portfolio companies and eventually exit through sales to larger investment funds or strategic buyers. umgi does not invest in startups, instead focusing on businesses that require additional equity capital and external expertise to scale.

The investment team at umgi is actively engaged in sourcing new opportunities across Ukraine, the EU, Turkey and India. These opportunities span key sectors, including waste management, industrial minerals, B2B manufacturing, healthcare, energy transition, and AI-enabling hardware.

In addition to direct investments, umgi serves as an M&A advisor and minority co-investor for foreign investors entering the Ukrainian market. The company provides comprehensive support throughout the investment process, including market analysis, competitive landscape evaluation, negotiations, due diligence, asset valuation, and transaction execution.

umgi also assists Ukrainian investors seeking international expansion, leveraging its network of offices and strategic partnerships. Through local teams based in Poland, Romania, Spain, Italy, Turkey, and India, the company supports portfolio businesses in scaling their operations across these markets.

== ESG investments ==
umgi supports the development of a circular and green economy in its markets and invests in ESG-related projects.

The company established one of Ukraine's largest recycling enterprises, Recycling Solutions, which manages by-products from thermal power generation and metallurgical processes. Another key portfolio company, REGEN, specializes in converting industrial gases into electric and thermal energy. It develops cogeneration projects that utilize mine methane, coke oven gas, blast furnace gas, converter gas, associated petroleum gas, and landfill gas, contributing to more sustainable and efficient energy use.

umgi also invested in the development of Feednova, one of Ukraine's processors and producers of animal proteins. The company manufactures high-protein feed additives from animal by-products and is the first facility in Ukraine to collaborate with external raw material suppliers, including agricultural enterprises.

Arnox processes and distributes rare and technical gases, including argon, nitrogen, oxygen, xenon, krypton, and neon.

Ukrainian Mineral Fertilizers specializes in the production of granular ammonium sulfate, a by-product of the coke-chemical industry.

umgi's portfolio companies follow ESG principles. Its investments target public utilities, social infrastructure development, healthcare support, preschool and educational facilities, and the implementation of environmental and educational projects.

== Assets ==
=== Industrial portfolio ===
==== INTECH ====
INTECH is a Ukrainian group of companies specializing in the production of industrial goods and the provision of services to enterprise clients. Its core areas include railway logistics, operational support for the production of components used in the metallurgical industry, maritime logistics, industrial blasting services, and the recycling of industrial waste and by-products. The company has been active since 2013.

==== INWIRE ====
INWIRE Group is one of the producers and suppliers of cored wire and briquettes for metallurgical and foundry plants across the EMEA region. The company exports its products to ten countries and operates production facilities in Ukraine and Turkey.

==== PORTINVEST LOGISTIC ====
PORTINVEST LOGISTIC is a provider of freight forwarding and customs brokerage services in Ukraine, specializing in maritime, river, and railway transportation, as well as ship agency operations. It is recognized as one of the major players in the Ukrainian logistics market. Since 2010, PortInvest has also implemented a range of investment projects in maritime logistics.

==== PJSC “PVP Kryvbasvybukhprom” ====
PJSC “PVP Kryvbasvybukhprom” is one of Ukraine's most prominent companies specializing in blasting operations and the production of emulsion explosives for mining and processing enterprises. As of 2024, the company employed more than 300 people.

==== Recycling Solutions ====
Recycling Solutions is a Ukrainian enterprise focused on the strategic management of industrial waste and by-products. With a commitment to circular resource use and environmental responsibility, the company serves the coal, metallurgical, and thermal energy sectors. Its core activities include the processing and sale of ash and slag materials, as well as metallurgical slags, positioning it as an integrated provider of secondary resource management.

==== ARNOX ====
ARNOX is a Ukrainian full-cycle operator specializing in the processing and sale of rare and technical gases. The company supplies both individual gases and custom gas mixtures, develops and implements gas installation projects, and provides comprehensive practical advice with regard to gas supply to industrial enterprises. ARNOX handles a wide range of gases, including argon, nitrogen, oxygen, xenon, krypton, and neon. Since its founding in 2016, the company has expanded its reach, exporting to over 20 countries and serving industries such as electronics manufacturing, aerospace, scientific research, medicine, and pharmaceuticals.

==== Ukrainian Mineral Fertilizers ====
Founded in 2017, Ukrainian Mineral Fertilizers operates a facility for processing and storing mineral fertilizers in Kryvyi Rih (Ukraine). Its main product is granulated ammonium sulfate, with production capacity reaching up to 100,000 tonnes per year.

==== FEEDNOVA ====
FEEDNOVA is a Ukrainian producer of high-protein feed additives. It is the first facility in Ukraine to accept and process raw materials from external suppliers, including agricultural enterprises. The company offers a full range of services, including the collection, transportation, preparation, and processing of animal by-products. FEEDNOVA is a joint investment project of Effective Investments Group in partnership with the Dutch company Mada Participations B.V. and the investment firm umgi.

==== REGEN ====
REGEN is an industrial company that delivers practical advice for the utilization of off-gases and the generation of electric and thermal energy for industrial enterprises. It specializes in the development and implementation of cogeneration projects using various gas sources, including mine methane, coke oven gas, blast furnace gas, converter gas, associated petroleum gas, and landfill gas.

=== Mining Portfolio ===
==== VESCO ====
VESCO is a group of companies specializing in the extraction and supply of ceramic raw materials. It operates production facilities across Ukraine, Spain, Romania, Italy, Poland, and Serbia, with a total annual production capacity of up to 3.5 million tonnes. VESCO exports its products to over 10 countries, serving a diverse international client base in the ceramics industry.

== See also ==
- SCM Holdings
