= Vladimir Degtyarenko =

Ukrainian-born Russian politician

- Владимир Дегтяренко
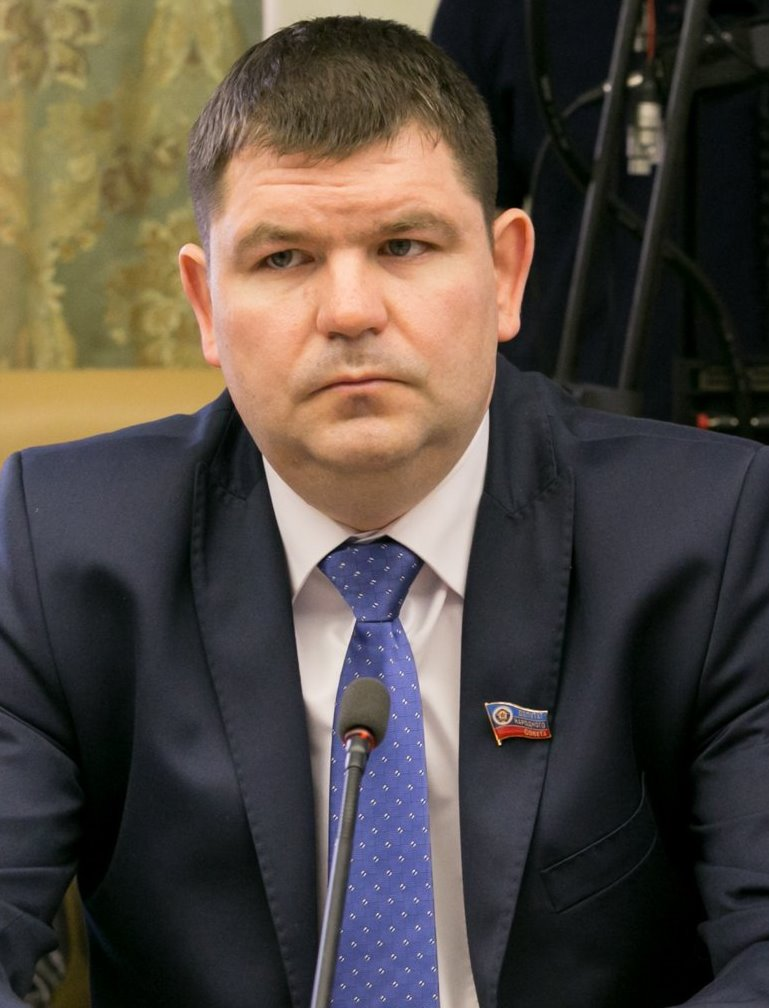
- Degtyarenko in 2016

Chairman of the People's Council of the Luhansk People's Republic
- In office 1 April 2016 – 21 December 2017
- Preceded by: Aleksey Karyakin
- Succeeded by: Denis Miroshnichenko

Personal details
- Born: 5 April 1982 (age 44) Lutuhyne, Luhansk Oblast, Ukrainian SSR, Soviet Union
- Party: Peace to Luhanshchyna
- Education: Donbas State Technical University

Military service
- Allegiance: Luhansk People's Republic

Vladimir Nikolaevich Degtyarenko (Russian: Владимир Николаевич Дегтяренко; born 5 April 1982) is a Ukrainian separatist and politician of the unrecognized Luhansk People's Republic. He was the second Chairman of the People's Council of the Lugansk People's Republic from 1 April 2016 to 21 December 2017.

== Early life ==
Degtyarenko was born on 5 April 1982, in the city of Lutuhyne of the Luhansk Oblast. In 2004, he graduated from the DSMI with a degree in industrial and civil construction and later graduated from Donbas State Technical University with a degree in enterprise economics in 2011.

== Career ==
Since the start of the Russo-Ukrainian War, he was an active supporter of the Russian forces and the holding of a referendum in the Luhansk People's Republic (LPR).

On 18 May 2014, he was elected a deputy of the first convocation of the People's Council of the Luhansk People's Republic. During the entire period of hostilities in the summer of 2014, he was in Luhansk, engaged in parliamentary and humanitarian activities, and did not leave the city even disregarding the Russo-Ukrainian conflict.

In September 2014, he came from Luhansk to the city of Lutuhyne and became acting leader in Lutuhyne Raion and the city. In the same month, the deputies of the district officially appointed Degtyarenko as chairman of the Lutuhyne district council.

Since 1 April 2016, he was the Chairman of the People's Council of the Luhansk People's Republic and also approved by the Deputy Chairman of the Public Movement "Peace to Luhanshchina" for work with the People's Council of the LPR. He received 40 votes in his favor.

On 21 December 2017, he was unanimously, by 33 deputies present, dismissed from the post of chairman of the People's Council of the LPR because he had "improper organization of the work of the people's council".
