= Voroshilovsk =

Voroshilovsk may refer to:

- Voroshilovsk, name of Stavropol, a city in Stavropol Krai, Russia, in 1935-1943
- Voroshilovsk, name of Alchevsk, a town in Luhansk Oblast, Ukraine, in 1931-1961
