= Nikolai Babanin =

- Николай Андреевич Бабанин
- Born: 23 April 1918; Voroshilovsk, Voroshilovsky District, Slavyanoserbsk uezd, Yekaterinoslav Governorate, Ukrainian SSR
- Died: 11 May 1990 (aged 72); Minsk, Byelorussian SSR, Soviet Union
- Military career
- Allegiance: Soviet Union
- Branch: Soviet Tank Forces
- Service years: 1938–1957
- Rank: Colonel
- Conflicts: World War II; Invasion of Poland; Eastern Front
- Awards: Hero of the Soviet Union

Nikolai Andreyevich Babanin (Russian: Николай Андреевич Бабанин; 23 April 1918 — 11 May 1990) was a Soviet military officer. He served in the Soviet invasion of Poland, and the Second World War. During the Great Patriotic War, he was commander of the reconnaissance company of the 5th Guards Volnovakha Order of Suvorov Mechanized Brigade of the 2nd Guards Nikolaev-Budapest Red Banner Order of Suvorov Mechanized Corps of the 28th Army of the 3rd Ukrainian Front. He reached the rank of guard captain during his wartime service.

Babanin was awarded the title of Hero of the Soviet Union on 3 June 1944.

== Biography ==
Babanin was born on 23 April 1918 in the administrative center of the Voroshilovsky district, the village of Voroshilovsk (now the city of Alchevsk, Luhansk Oblast), Luhansk district, Donetsk province in a working-class family. Russian. Member of the CPSU (b) / CPSU since 1941. He graduated from incomplete secondary school No. 2 on Lenin Street in the city of Voroshilovsk. He worked as a secretary of the factory committee of trade unions of the Voroshilovsky slag-brick plant on Red Partisans Street.

In the Red Army since 1938. Participated in the liberation campaign against Western Ukraine in 1939. He graduated from the Kharkov Military-Political School in July 1941 and was appointed to the post of commissar of the reconnaissance company of a tank battalion.

Babanin fought in the Great Patriotic War since July 1941. He fought on the Stalingrad, Southern, 4th, 3rd and 2nd Ukrainian fronts. Wounded six times. Particularly distinguished himself during the Bereznegovatoye–Snigirevka offensive.

The assault group of the 5th Guards Mechanized Brigade of the 2nd Guards Nikolaev-Budapest Red Banner Order of Suvorov Mechanized Corps of the 28th Army of the 3rd Ukrainian Front of ten scouts, led by the commander of the reconnaissance company of the guard, Captain Babanin, was the first to reach the Dnieper, on the night of 10 March 1944 successfully crossed the river near the village of Dremaylovka (Berislavsky District, Kherson Oblast) and captured a bridgehead on the right bank. During the crossing in the battle to seize the bridgehead, three scouts died, Captain Babanin sent two to the left bank with a prisoner who had valuable information. Remaining six, the Babanin group repelled seven enemy counterattacks during the day and ensured the crossing of the brigade units.

On 11 March, in the battles for the city of Beryslav, Babanin's group was the first to break into the city.

In the following days, having carried out reconnaissance along the Kherson-Nikolaev railway line, Babanin obtained important information about the enemy.

On the night of 13 March, the reconnaissance guards of Captain Babanin secretly made their way through the enemy's defensive line and reached the eastern bank of the Inhulets south of the village of Nikolskoye. With a sudden and daring attack, they captured boats and ferries, overtook them to the opposite bank to their own. As part of the advance detachment of the brigade, Babanin broke into the northern part of Kherson.

In total, for the period from 10 March to 15 March 1944, the scouts under the command of Babanin continuously supplied the command with valuable information, captured 13 "languages", exterminated more than two hundred Nazis.

He was awarded the title of Hero of the Soviet Union for his participation in the crossing of the Dnieper in the Kakhovka region near the village of Dremaylovka, Berislavsky district, Kherson region. Babanin received an order from the corps commander to cross the Dnieper, seize the language there and, if possible, gain a foothold on the right bank.

By decree of the Presidium of the Supreme Soviet of the Soviet Union of 3 June 1944, for courage, bravery and heroism shown in the fight against the Nazi invaders, Guard Captain Babanin was awarded the title of Hero of the Soviet Union with the Order of Lenin and the Gold Star medal (No. 3875).

Later he participated in the liberation of Hungary, Austria, Czechoslovakia.

After the war he continued to serve in the army. In 1949 he graduated from the Higher Armored Officer School. In 1957, Colonel Babanin was in the reserve. He lived in Minsk, worked as a military instructor at secondary school No. 118. He died on 11 May 1990.

== Awards ==
- Medal "Gold Star" of the Hero of the Soviet Union (No. 3875)
- Order of Lenin
- Order of Kutuzov III degree
- Order of the Patriotic War, 1st class
- Order of the Patriotic War II degree
- Three Orders of the Red Star
- Medals including:
- Medal "For the Victory over Germany in the Great Patriotic War 1941-1945"
- Jubilee Medal "Twenty Years of Victory in the Great Patriotic War 1941-1945"
- Jubilee Medal "Thirty Years of Victory in the Great Patriotic War 1941-1945"
- Jubilee Medal "Forty Years of Victory in the Great Patriotic War 1941-1945"

== Literature ==
- Heroes of the Soviet Union: A Brief Biographical Dictionary / Prev. ed. Collegium I. N. Shkadov. - M .: Military Publishing, 1987. - T. 1 / Abaev - Lyubichev /. — 911 p. — 100,000 copies. — ISBN ots., Reg. No. in RCP 87–95382.
