= Aleksey Karyakin =

Russian politician (born 1980)

- Алексей Карякин
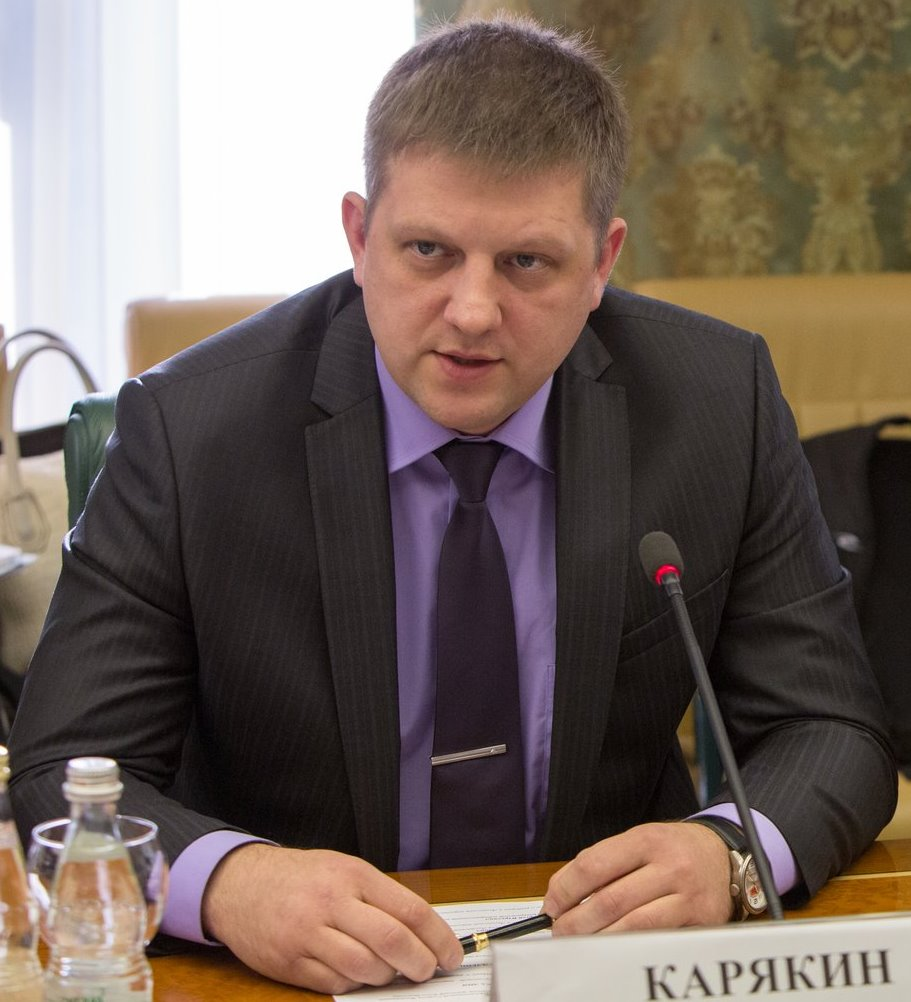
- Karyakin in 2014

Chairman of the People's Council of the Luhansk People's Republic
- In office 18 May 2014 – 25 March 2016
- Preceded by: Office established
- Succeeded by: Vladimir Degtyarenko

Personal details
- Born: 7 April 1980 (age 46) Stakhanov (now Kadiivka), Ukrainian SSR, Soviet Union

Aleksey Vyacheslavovych Karyakin (Russian: Алексей Вячеславович Карякин; born 7 April 1980) is a former chairman of the People's Council (parliament) of the Luhansk People's Republic, a disputed and internationally unrecognized Russian republic on de jure Ukrainian territory. He was voted out on 25 March 2016.

A rumor that Karyakin was imprisoned in the LPR was reported on in the media, however, in an interview with Kommersant he denied those claims. He is suspected of attempted murder "of law enforcement officers and military personnel", "international damage to another's property" and "illegal purchase, storage, transportation or carrying of firearms and ammunition".

== Early life ==
Karyakin was born in Stakhanov (now Kadiivka) in the Luhansk region of the Ukrainian SSR. After graduating from college with a degree in motor vehicle maintenance and repair, he had a small business.

On May 18, 2014 Karyakin was elected head of parliament of the unrecognized state of Luhansk People's Republic.

== Sanctions ==
He was sanctioned by the UK government in 2014 in relation to the Russo-Ukrainian War.
