= Volodymyr Chub =

Ukrainian politician and businessman (born 1956)

- Володимир Чуб
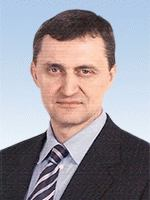
- A picture of him from 2012.

People's Deputy of Ukraine
- In office 12 December 2012 – 27 November 2014
- Constituency: Luhansk Oblast, No. 110

Mayor of Alchevsk
- In office 26 March 2006 – 12 December 2012
- Preceded by: Mykola Kyrychenko
- Succeeded by: Volodymyr Kosyuha

Personal details
- Born: Volodymyr Yevhenovych Chub; 30 August 1956 (age 70) Dnipropetrovsk, Ukrainian SSR, Soviet Union (now Dnipro, Ukraine)
- Party: Independent (2006-2010); Party of Regions (2010-2014)
- Education: Ukrainian State University of Chemical Technology (1982)

Volodymyr Yevhenovych Chub (Ukrainian: Володимир Євгенович Чуб; born 30 August 1956) is a Ukrainian politician and businessman who served as a People's Deputy of Ukraine in the Verkhovna Rada from 2012 to its premature end in 2014 with the Party of Regions. Previous to this, he was a two-term mayor of the city of Alchevsk in Luhansk Oblast from 2006 to 2012. He was also active in the business sector, as he directed the Alchevsk Coke Plant ("Alchevskkoks") from 1996 to 2006.

== Early life ==
Chub was born on 30 September 1956 in the city of Dnipropetrovsk, which was then part of the Ukrainian SSR in the Soviet Union. After graduating from secondary school, he immediately pursued higher education. In 1982, Chub graduated from the Ukrainian State University of Chemical Technology in his hometown with a certification as a chemical engineer and technologist, with a specific specialisation in solid fuels and carbon materials. Afterwards, he moved to Luhansk Oblast and began working as an operator in the rectification shop of the Alchevsk Coke Plant (otherwise known as "Alchevskkoks"). He remained at the plant for the rest of his career, working his way to foreman of the capture shop, then deputy head of the Department of Production, then deputy head of the sulfur purification shop, and then finally he was promoted to chief engineer in 1992.

== Business career ==
Logo of "Alchevskkoks" in 1994. Chub worked there for most of his career, and later directed it.

In 1996, after the collapse of the Soviet Union, he was appointed CEO of Alchevskkoks, and later, upon restructuring, was also appointed its general director in 2004. Under his control, the coke plant was bought out by the Industrial Union of Donbas (ISD) in 2002, which is owned by a consortium of Russian investors, most notably Alexander Katunin of Evraz. It was alleged that the purchase was mostly initiated in the interests of Evraz. Chub eventually left the directorship role in 2006 when he became Mayor of Alchevsk.

== Political career ==
=== 2002-2006: Early career in Luhansk Oblast ===
In 2002, Chub announced his candidacy for the post of deputy of the Luhansk Oblast Council, representing the city of Alchevsk. He was elected to the council that year, and served for one term until 2006.

=== 2006-2012: Mayor of Alchevsk ===
In early 2006, Chub was elected Mayor of Alchevsk as an independent, although he was supported by the party faction "Eco+25%", which was affiliated with ISD. The elections were called early due to the winter disaster of 2006, in which the city's entire district heating system collapsed and was called at the time "the worst man-made disaster in the history of independent Ukraine". The three-time mayor at the time, Mykola Kyrychenko, a member of the Party of Regions, attempted to vie for re-election but only won 14.7% of the vote, even after appealing that he had tried to talk to the then president Viktor Yushchenko, although many blamed Kyrychenko for the disaster and it effectively ended his political career in favour of Chub. In an analysis in 2006, the Ukrainian newspaper Ukrrudprom stated that Chub's victory in the race mostly represented the dominance of the Industrial Union of Donbas (ISD) in the city, because both Alchevskkoks and the Alchevsk Metallurgical Complex, the city-forming enterprises, were both owned by the ISD. After becoming mayor, he signed a memorandum of cooperation with the ISD and USAID, specifically to strategically develop Alchevsk. Most of Chub's first term, though, revolved around the preceding winter crisis in 2006, with Chub focusing on improving the heating systems in the city year-round. Towards the end of his term, in April 2010, Chub joined the Party of Regions, alongside most of the employees of Alchevskkokks.

Chub was re-elected for a second term in November 2010, beating Kyrychenko again. Soon after, in January 2011, he signed a strategic plan for improving the competitiveness in central Luhansk Oblast, together with Yurii Borisov of the city of Stakhanov (since 2016, Kadiivka) and Mykola Morgunov of Bryanka, which would last theoretically until 2015. It was speculated towards the middle of his term, all the way back in May 2012, that he would run in the upcoming 2012 Ukrainian parliamentary elections due to his going to Kyiv to meet at the headquarters of the Party of Regions. There, he was part of the interviewees for potential deputies in constituency No. 110. In accordance with his election, Chub resigned from the post of mayor on 22 November 2012, since dual mandates are forbidden.

=== 2012-2014: Verkhovna Rada ===
True to the speculation, in June 2012 Chub announced his candidacy in the 2012 Ukrainian parliamentary elections for constituency No. 110, with him representing the Party of Regions. At the time of its formation in 2012, constituency no. 110 consisted of the cities of Alchevsk and Antratsyt, along some areas of the Antratsyt Raion and Lutuhyne Raion.During the election campaigns, leaflets were distributed by unknown persons, in which Chub allegedly congratulated the veterans of Alchevsk on the anniversary of the creation of the Ukrainian Insurgent Army (UPA). The race in the 110th was also accused of not having equal opportunities, according to the Communist Party of Ukraine (CPU) candidate, Oleksandr Bebeshko. Chub eventually won the constituency with 48.08% (44,126 people) of the vote, with the self-nominated candidate Oleksandr Zhuchenko placing second at 19.28% and third place going to the CPU candidate Bebeshko at 15.89%.

Upon joining the Rada, Chub joined the faction of the Party of Regions and was appointed Chairman of the Subcommittee on State Monitoring of the Environment. In October 2013, he voted for all European integration laws, one of five Luhansk Oblast deputies to do so. However, with the expansion of Euromaidan protests in December 2013 after Viktor Yanukovych refused to pass the association agreement with the EU, Chub accused "the opposition" of politicising the European issue. He also said that police in Kyiv were acting tolerantly and were not using special forces despite "provocations", and that the opposition were trying to plunge Ukraine into a "civil war". Thus, he refused to vote for the resolution that condemned the subsequent bloodshed by the police (the Heavenly Hundred) in Kyiv in January 2014. In June 2014, he left the Party of Regions and joined the "For Peace and Stability" faction in parliament, which was widely described as pro-Russian. Thus, towards the end of his mandate, in September 2014, Oleksandr Turchynov said that Chub was supporting Russian aggression and separatism during the War in the Donbas by joining the group. He did not run for re-election in the snap 2014 Ukrainian parliamentary elections.

== Personal life ==
He is married and has two sons.

== Honours and awards ==
Chub has been awarding the following:

- State Prize of Ukraine in Science and Technology (2009)
