= Andriy Tsvik =

Ukrainian footballer

Personal information
- Full name: Andriy Stepanovych Tsvik
- Date of birth: 9 February 1971 (age 55)
- Place of birth: Komunarsk, Ukrainian SSR
- Height: 1.62 m (5 ft 4 in)
- Position: Midfielder

Youth career
- DYuSSh Alchevsk

Senior career*
| Years | Team | Apps | (Gls) |
| 1987–2005 | Stal Alchevsk | 505 | (52) |
| 2000–2001 | → Stal-2 Alchevsk | 13 | (1) |

Managerial career
- 2006–2007: Stal Alchevsk (reserves)
- 2007–2014: Stal Alchevsk (assistant)
- * Club domestic league appearances and goals

Andriy Stepanovych Tsvik (Ukrainian: Андрій Степанович Цвік; born 9 February 1971) is a Ukrainian former footballer. After his retirement in 2005, since 2007 he worked as an assistant coach of FC Stal Alchevsk in the Ukrainian First League.

He started with the club in 1987 when it played in Luhansk Oblast Football Championship under name of Budivelnyk Alchevsk. Tsvik holds number of records such as the most matches played in the Ukrainian First League (Persha Liha). His 400th match in "Persha Liha" he played in 2004 when Stal was facing off Naftovyk Okhtyrka.

On 12 July 2000 Tsvik made his debut in the Ukrainian Premier League in the home game against Arsenal Kyiv when it was known as CSKA.
