= Alchevsk =

City in Luhansk Oblast, Ukraine

Alchevsk Алчевськ (Ukrainian) Алчевск (Russian)
- City
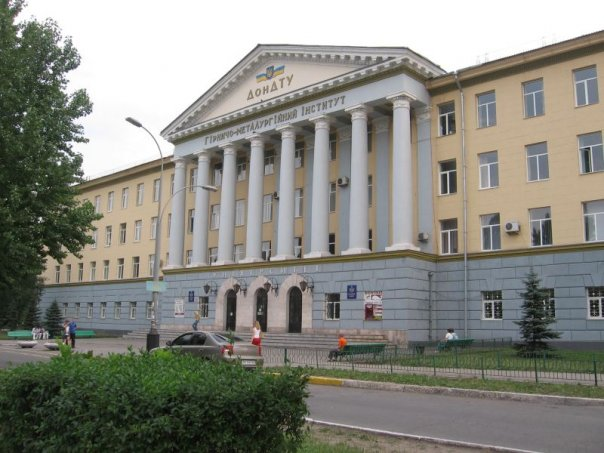
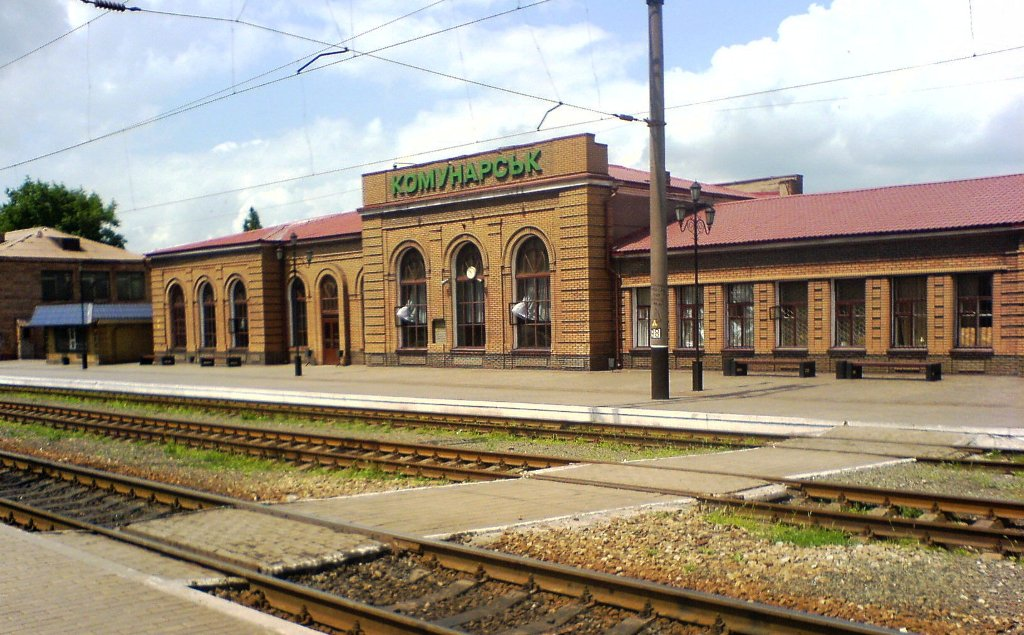
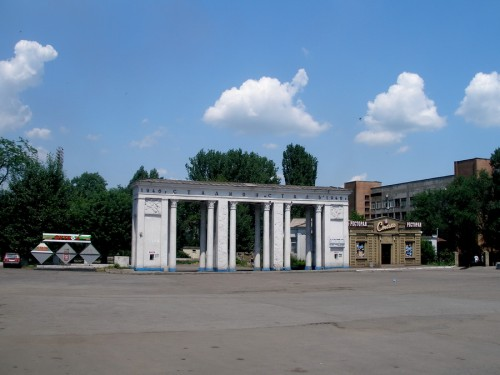
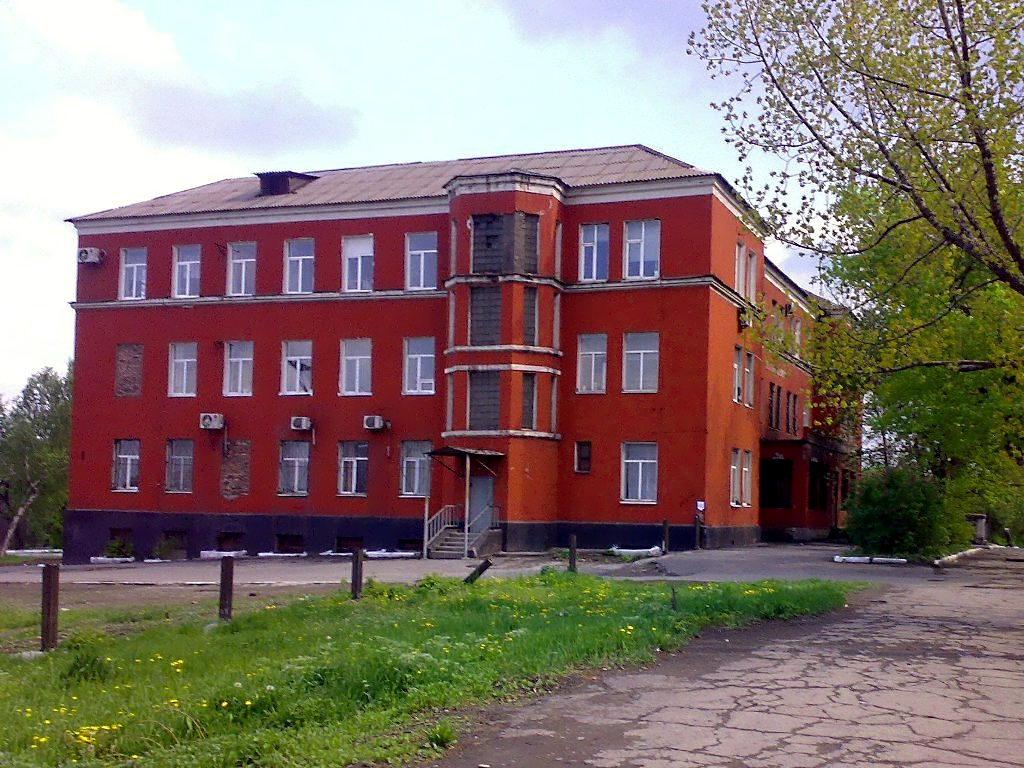
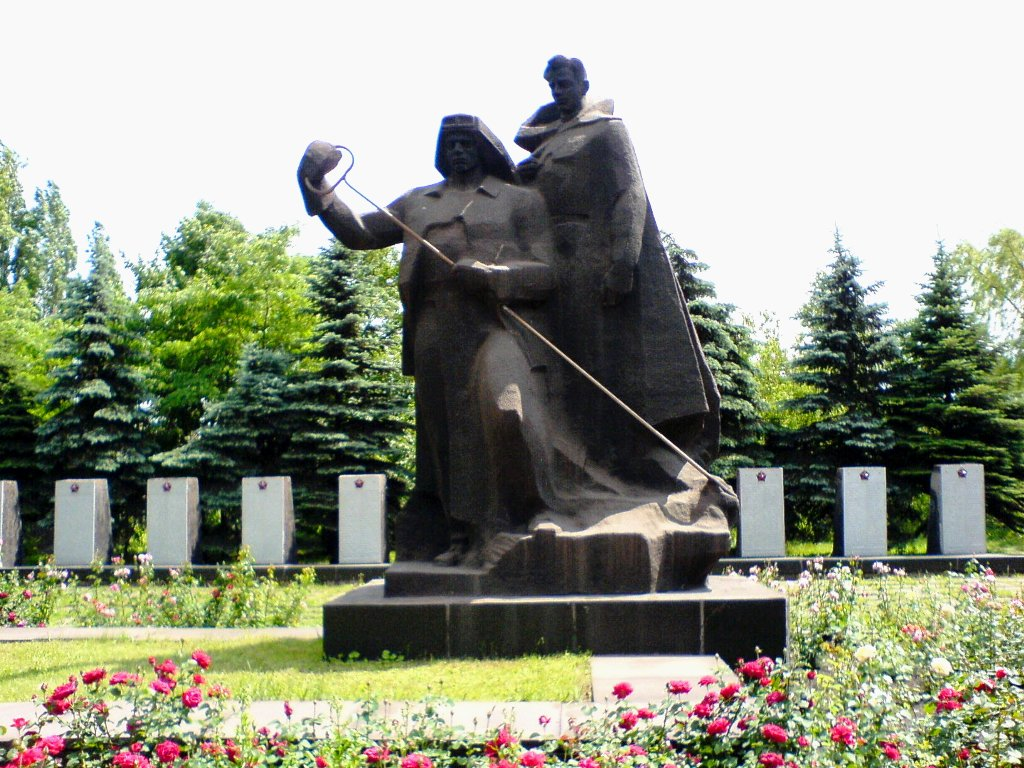
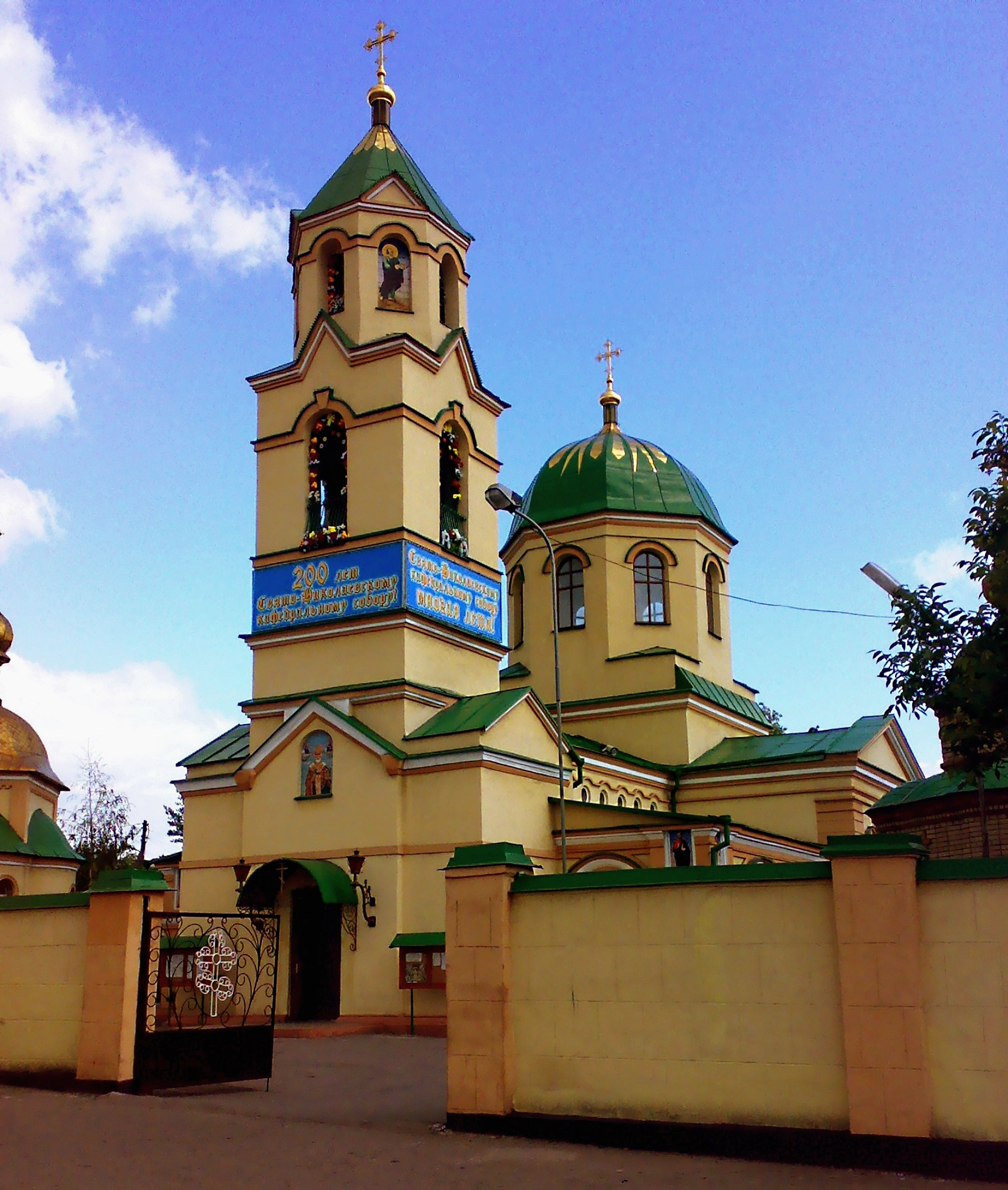
- Donbas State Technical University Alchevsk Railway Station Stal Stadium Factory hospital Memorial complex to metallurgists-soldiers Saint Nicholas Cathedral

- Flag Coat of arms
- Interactive map of Alchevsk
- Location of Alchevsk Alchevsk (Ukraine)
- Coordinates: 48°28′40″N 38°47′52″E
- Country: Ukraine
- Oblast: Luhansk Oblast
- Raion: Alchevsk Raion
- Hromada: Alchevsk urban hromada
- Founded: 1895
- City rights: 1932

Government
  - Mayor: Svetlana Grebenkova (installed by Russia)

Area
  - Total: 55 km^{2} (21 sq mi)
- Elevation: 240 m (790 ft)

Population (2022)
  - Total: ▼106,062
  - Rank: 38th in Ukraine
  - Density: 1,900/km^{2} (4,900/sq mi)
- Time zone: UTC+2 (EET)
  - Summer (DST): UTC+3 (EEST)
- Postal code: 94200-94299
- Area code: +380 6442
- Vehicle registration: BB / 13
- Climate: Dfb
- Website: https://alchevsk.su/ (Russian city occupational administration)

Alchevsk (Note: See §Name for former and native names) is a city and the nominal administrative center of Alchevsk Raion in Luhansk Oblast, Ukraine. Situated in the Donbas region of eastern Ukraine, it has an estimated population of 106,062 (2022 estimate), making it the second-most populous city in Luhansk Oblast and the 38th-most populous city in Ukraine. It is located 45 kilometres (28 miles) from the administrative center of the oblast, Luhansk.

The city originally started off as a workers' settlement built around the Alchevsk Metallurgical Complex in 1895 in Imperial Russia, known briefly as Yuryevka and then as Alchevsk. After the October Revolution, it was claimed by the Soviet Union. In 1931, it was renamed to Voroshylovsk after Kliment Voroshilov. After World War II, it remained a key hub for metallurgy and rapidly grew under the five-year plans implemented. It was renamed to Kommunarsk in 1961 due to the dismantling of personality cults following de-Stalinization, with the name remaining until 1991. Following the collapse of the Soviet Union, the city became part of Ukraine, and it was then renamed back to Alchevsk in 1991. In 2014, during the War in the Donbas, the city came under the control of pro-Russian separatists, who incorporated it into the self-proclaimed Luhansk People's Republic. After a highly disputed referendum, the region was annexed by Russia in 2022. As of 2026, Russia has full control of the city.

Alchevsk remains one of the largest industrial centres in the Donbas, especially in the metallurgical and chemical sectors. The largest employer is the Alchevsk Metallurgical Complex, a ferrous metallurgy enterprise, alongside the "Alchevsk Coke-Chemical Plant". Cultural landmarks include the Saint Nicholas Cathedral, the Alchevsk Railway Station, and Kino Metalurh. The main museum of the city is the City Historical Museum of Alchevsk. It was also formerly home to FC Stal Alchevsk of the Ukrainian First League, which played its home games at Stal Stadium. However, the club ceased to exist in 2014 due to the war. It is also notably home to the Donbas State Technical University, although the university has remained split between Ukrainian and Russian authorities since 2014.

== Name ==
=== Current name ===
- Ukrainian: Алчевськ
- Russian: Алчевск

=== Former names ===
- Yuryevka (Ukrainian: Юр'ївка; Russian: Юрьевка) 1895–1903
- Alchevsk (Ukrainian: Алчевське; Russian: Алчевское) 1903–1931
- Voroshylovsk (Ukrainian: Ворошиловськ; Russian: Ворошиловск) 1931–1961
- Kommunarsk (Ukrainian: Комунарськ; Russian: Коммунарск) 1961–1991

=== Name history ===
The original name of the city when it was founded in 1895 was Yuryevka, which means "Yury's village". The name comes from the nearby rail station, which was part of the Catherine Railway and established in 1878, and originally also named Yuryevka. However, just a few years later in 1903, the village was renamed to Alchevsk. Alchevskoye comes from the surname of the founder of the city, Aleksey Alchevsky, who had died two years before in 1901 after jumping under a train at the Vitebsky railway station. The renaming was done at the request of fellow Russian industrialists. The name remained this way for another thirty years, when it was again renamed, this time to Voroshylovsk. Voroshylovsk or Voroshilovsk was chosen by the Soviets in honour of the Soviet statesman and military officer, Kliment Voroshilov, who served as Chairman of the Presidium of the Supreme Soviet of the Soviet Union from 1953 to 1960 and as People's Commissar for Defence from 1925 to 1940. Voroshilov was born in the Luhansk region, and began his labour and revolutionary activities at the DYUMO plant in the city.

After another thirty years, the city was renamed to Kommunarsk in 1961. Kommunarsk means "city of communards", which was a fairly generic Soviet ideological toponym that referred to participants in the Paris Commune, which was a revolutionary government that briefly seized power in France. The name was chosen to replace Voroshylovsk because of Khrushchev's de-Stalinization campaign, which dismantled the personality cults around Stalin-era figures, including Voroshilov, who was seen as close to Stalin. Following the collapse of the Soviet Union and the formation of an independent Ukraine in 1991, the name was changed from Kommunarsk to its present name, Alchevsk, which had previously been in use from 1903 to 1931. The vote to change the city's name back to Alchevsk was done on 1 December 1991 by the city's residents in a local city-wide referendum.

== History ==
=== Early history ===
The land on which the city was founded prior to 1895 was divided among landowners. The most notable landowners during this time were I.I Hladkov, M.A. Zhillo, the brothers V.N. and Yu. N. Rodakov, and Prince A.S. Dolhorukov. M.A. Zhillo's estate was bought by Zhilovsky Coal Mining Society after his death, which led to the society being named after him, and the serfs from this society settled into the area and created a small settlement named Zhylivka. Zhylivka would eventually become a microdistrict of Alchevsk. I.I. Hladkov also eventually mortgaged his land to the Kharkov Land Bank, and it was then purchased by Alekseyevska Mining Society (which was founded by Oleksiy Alchevsky). The other land that would eventually become Alchevsk was agricultural land, with peasants in Vasyivka and Dolzhyk each having one Desiatina of land after the emancipation of the serfs. However, the agricultural land was poor: of twelve harvests between 1872 and 1875, eight were classified as poor, and in 1880 locusts destroyed all the grain, and then in 1883–84 squirrels destroyed almost all the harvest in the area. Due to this, some of the peasants moved away towards factory work, although a lot would return after Alchevsk's founding in 1895.

By the time of the city's founding, only three existing settlements remained around the area: a village known as Vasylivka, which had 170 households, a small hamlet known as Dolzhyk with 11 households, and then a small number of people who lived around the station itself. By 1895, the area was part of the Vasylivska volost of Slavyanoserbsk uezd.

Simultaneous to this was the founding of the Yuryivka rail station, which opened in 1878 as part of the Catherine Railway, a state railway that was intended for the Ukrainian provinces of the Russian Empire, and was 2 km from Vasilyevka.

=== Imperial city ===
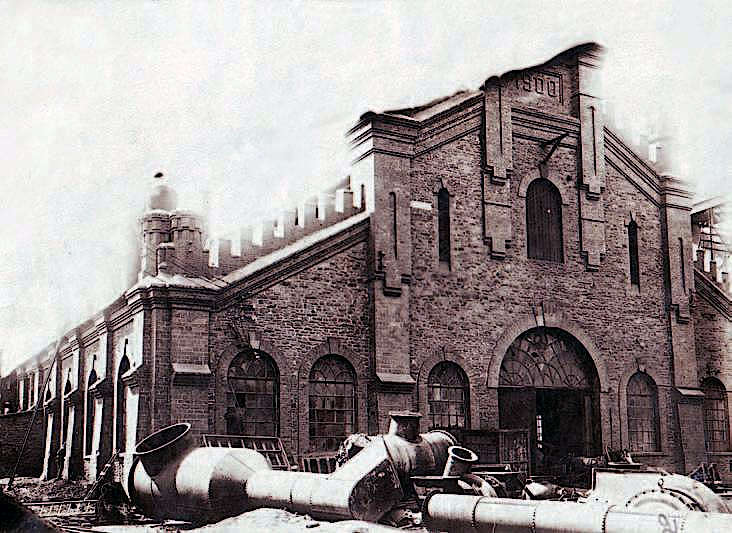
The Alchevsk Metallurgical Complex, which the city was built around. Pictured here in 1900.

Alchevsk was founded in 1895 with the establishment of the Alchevsk Metallurgical Complex under Oleksiy Alchevsky near the Yuryivka rail station, who had founded the Donetsk–Yuryev Metallurgical Society. To help work on the project, a group of specialists from the German Empire arrived, alongside other skilled workers from Yuzovsky (near Donetsk), peasants from Yekaterinoslav and Poltava, and artels from Oryol, Kursk, and Minsk. Workers' barracks known as the "Old Colony" were built for the new inhabitants alongside stone houses known as the "Administrative Colony" for the management which were primarily German foreigners, which marked the start of the workers' settlement that would eventually become the city. On 26 May 1896, construction of the plant finally finished and the first blast furnace is lit, which is why sometimes 1896 is given as the founding year of the city instead.

In 1898, soon after the city's founding a social-democratic group from Rostov distributed Marxist literature to the plant and sent the worker Ivan Galushka to the plant in order to found a social-democratic circle in the area under his leadership. Among its earliest members was Kliment Voroshilov, who would eventually become People's Commissar for Defense of the Soviet Union. Meetings were held at the factory school and at apartments of teachers. In 1899, the group led a strike of crane operators in the city working at the plant, and although the strike succeeded, it ended in the blacklisting of Voroshilov and other members. By 1900, the settlement grew rapidly. In addition to the original Old and Administrative Colonies, the New Colony appeared, and the settlement of Zhylovsky also grew around the city. The pre-existing village of Vasylyivka also grew into a large workers' settlement. Gradually, over the years, all of these distinct settlements would merge into a singular one. Technically, there was no formal name for the city that would eventually merge into being modern-day Alchevsk, but informally it was called Yuryivka after the nearby railway stations, and this gradually became used in official documents.

However, the new city was described as "wretched and gloomy", with the Old Colony having no running water or sewage system and everything was covered in soot, with the barracks being unsanitary. In 1901, Alchevsky died by suicide in St. Petersburg, and so in his honour the new city was renamed to "Alchevsk" in 1903. In 1903, the social-democratic group was restarted, and in 1905 the workers of the city were among the first to strike in response to Bloody Sunday. During the failed Russian Revolution of 1905, the city briefly had a Workers' Soviet established, which was chaired by the Bolshevik D.K. Paranich, and a self-defense militia was formed in the city to prevent the ensuing pogroms in the city by the Black Hundred. Briefly, the revolutionaries became the de facto authorities until the empire reinstalled power. Nevertheless, the Russian Social Democratic Labour Party under Stanisław Kosior continued to operate underground, but by 1908 there were crushed. After the start of World War I in 1914, most men in the city were mobilised, leading to three times the amount of women in the city to replace them.

=== Soviet era ===
==== War and revolution ====
In early March 1917, news of the February Revolution reached the city, leading to the re-establishment of a Soviet, and during the subsequent October Revolution a workers' militia disbanded representatives of the Provisional Government in the city. During this time, a Red Guard detachment was also started in the city. However, after the signing of the Treaty of Brest-Litovsk, it was agreed upon that the German Empire was invited into the Ukrainian People's Republic territory in order to help the UNR against the Bolsheviks. Thus, in April 1918, German forces entered Alchevsk and started occupying the city, although some of the residents had already left with the retreating Soviet forces, and in May the metallurgical complex was shut down. In November 1918, a group of partisans, together with residents from Bakhmut, raided the police headquarters and took control of the telegraph, telephone, and railway station. Kurylin Fyodor was appointed as the temporary partisan mayor. In early January 1919, the Red Army returned to the city and took over control from the partisans. However, this would only remain for a brief time. In April 1919, the White movement under Anton Denikin began advancing into the Donbas, and so the 1st Lozovo-Pavlivsky Workers' Communist Battalion was formed to fight back. This failed, as in early June Denikin's forces captured the city, forcing the communists to go back underground, led by Kosior. The city was again recaptured by the Soviets a few months later in December by the 1st Cavalry Army under Semyon Budyonny. For the rest of the Russian Civil War, the Soviets controlled the city.

In 1920, the city's boundaries were defined by the Soviets. During the 1921–1923 famine in Ukraine, the city was hit hard as the metallurgical complex was temporarily mothballed alongside other businesses. A local newspaper is published in the city since 1930. In 1931, Alchevsk was renamed Voroshylovsk, after Kliment Voroshilov, a Soviet military and party figure.

==== World War II ====
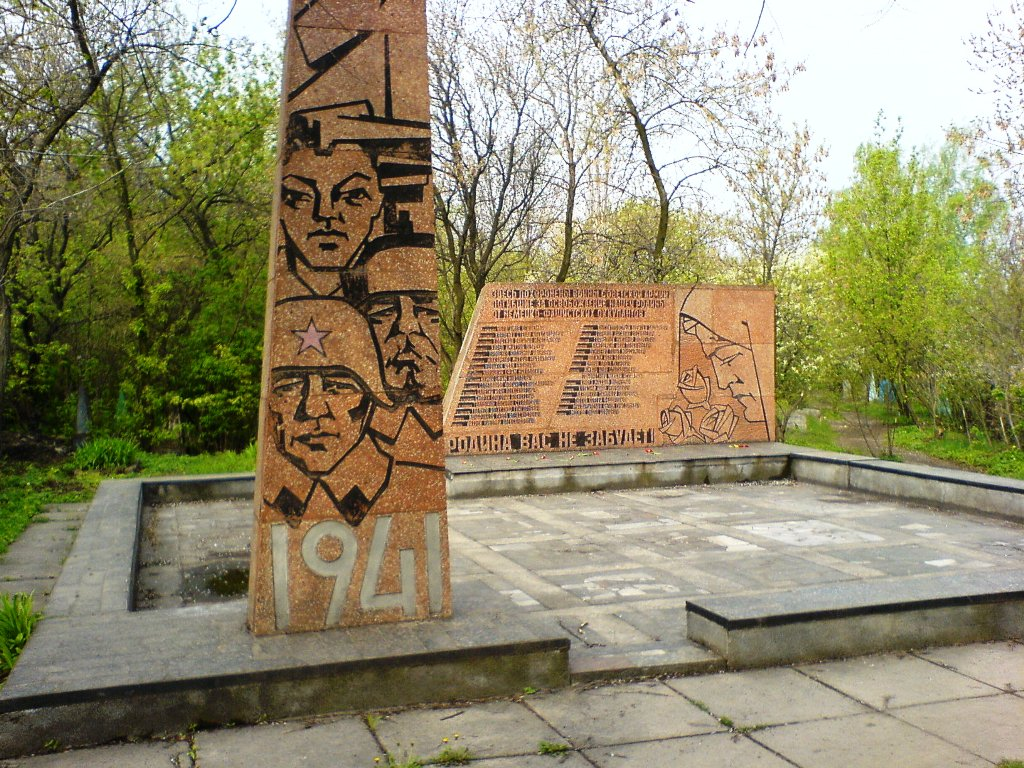
Mass grave of victims of World War II in Alchevsk.

On 22 June 1941, at the start of Operation Barbarossa, a mass rally was held at the central square by Secretary P.S. Laktionov and conscription to the Soviet Armed Forces started while 9,768 residents joined the people's militia. At the start of October 1941 until July 1942, the city was routinely subject to a German bombing campaign, which at first targeted the rolling shop to disable shell production. During this time, mass evacuations began, starting with a State Defense Committee order from October 1941, and post and telegraph services to the city were cut. Some were evacuated to Chelyabinsk Oblast, and others to Magnitogorsk and Uzbekistan. By January 1942, most equipment had been evacuated and only 400 workers remained of the around 10,750 prior. From June to July 1942, the second wave of evacuation began; this time, most equipment and the city's power station were partially destroyed. This occurred because the front line had mostly stabilised around 20–30 km from the city, while some workers remained behind to resume blast-furnace production to repair Soviet tanks and vehicles.

The city was then occupied from 12 July 1942 to 2 September 1943 by German forces. A VETs engineer known as Pivovarov was elected as civilian mayor by the German Ortskommandantur. During the time of occupation, around 1,231 civilians were deported to do forced labour in Germany, while 1,100 civilians and prisoners of war were shot within the city. This was on the directive from Heinrich Himmler and Erich Koch. During 1942–1943, the German occupiers operated a Gestapo prison in the city. From July 1942 to August 1943, the German occupying authorities used a former stone quarry in the city as an execution site for Soviets who were deemed patriots. It is the site where 83 residents were reportedly burned alive. Nevertheless, an underground resistance still operated in the city that was left to conduct intelligence and guerrilla warfare. On 2 September 1943, the city was liberated with minimal resistance as German forces had mostly withdrawn. Only around 53 soldiers were killed when approaching through Perevalsk, who were all members of the 315th Rifle Division. Other units involved in the liberation were the 51st Army and parts of the 91st Rifle Division.

==== Post-war ====
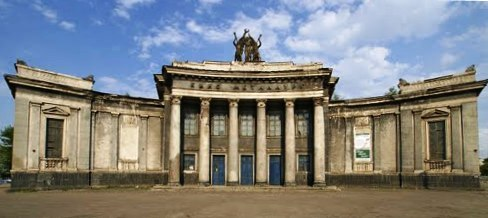
The building of the former Kino Metalurh, or Metallurg, a cinema built in 1950.

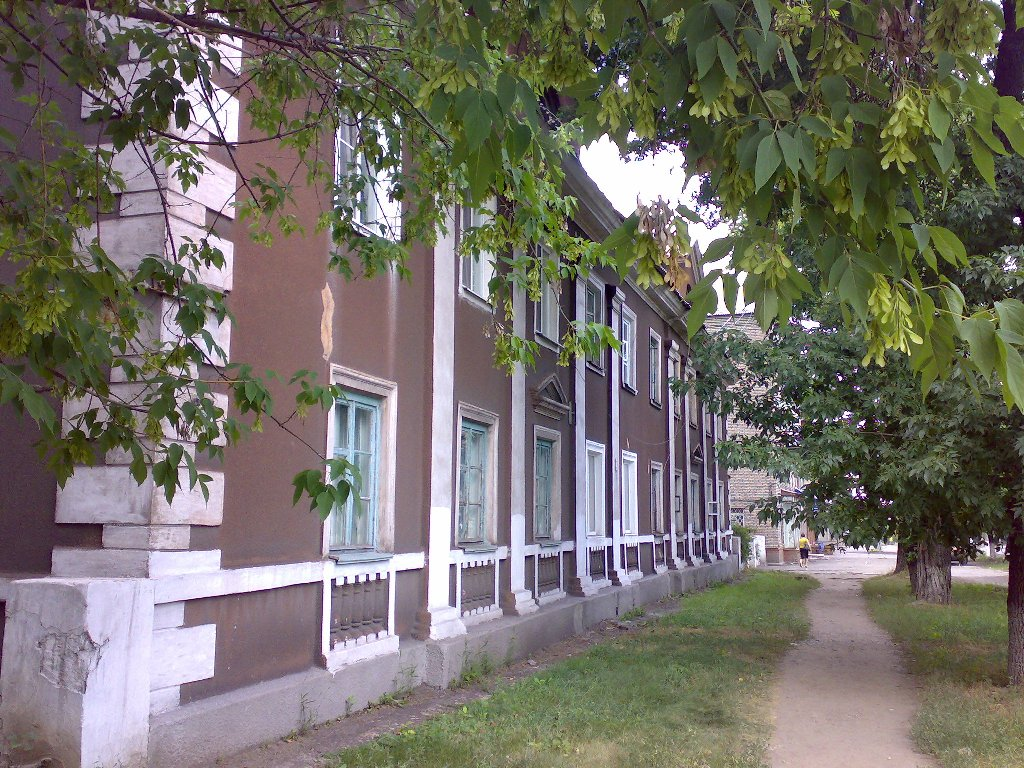
Housing built on Leningrad Street during the industrial boom of the 1970s–80s.

After the city's liberation, the metallurgical plant began restoration led by a government commission under Ivan Tevosian, the then People's Commissar of Ferrous Metallurgy. To help with this, 800 workers from the city of Chelyabinsk in the Russian SSR arrived to help with restoration. In addition, hundreds of workers from around Ukraine, including from Luhansk, Poltava, Kharkiv, Sumy, and Chernihiv, came to work on restoration, with many settling permanently afterwards. With this help, both the metallurgical complex and coke plant resumed production a year later in 1944. By the end of 1945, around 90,000 square meters of housing had been restored in the city. During the fourth five-year plan from 1945 to 1950, another 54,000 square meters of new housing were built, and in the 1950s it was approved to start a trolleybus line around the city over a tram line. Throughout the 1950s, more new buildings were built, including the historical cinema Kino Metalurh, a district of new cottages, and a factory hotel, among others. As Voroshilov's personality cult was diminishing, the town was renamed Kommunarsk in 1961. By the time of the eighth five-year plan from 1966 to 1970, the city's industrial output had grown nearly 25% and in a single year all the city's enterprises were making around 10 million rubles a year in profit.

However, with the increase in industrial output in the 1970s, the start of industrial air pollution also became a huge problem in the city, reaching levels that were above what was approved as a lethal dose. No environmental protections were ever implemented during this period to address the problem. Nevertheless, in 1971 the coke plant was awarded the Order of the Red Banner of Labour in 1971 and produced its 100 millionth ton of coke in 1975. In the 1980s, as the main plants grew bigger, they reached their peak production years, and housing construction grew rapidly as more metallurgical workers came to work within the city. After the dissolution of the Soviet Union, the original name was restored in 1991.

=== Independent Ukraine ===
==== Winter disaster of 2006 ====
On 22 January 2006, the city's district heating system collapsed, in what Luhansk Governor Gennady Moskal described as "the worst man-made disaster in the history of independent Ukraine" (Ukrainian: найгіршою антропогенною катастрофою в історії незалежної України). It has subsequently become a metonym in Ukrainian political discourse for cities without utility services, particularly during Russian infrastructural attacks in the 2020s invasion.

The system had already collapsed once before: in 1972, when the sole boiler failed. Contemporary Soviet authorities had authorized a second, back-up boiler, but did not further decentralize the system to preserve economies of scale.

In 2006, an underground pipe cracked in unusually cold weather (nearly −30 °C), isolating the main boiler from the system. The heat authority delayed draining the working fluid, and water throughout the system froze and burst additional pipes, some inside the walls of residential apartments. Consequently, many apartments could not be heated even after the boilers were restored to working order. Inhabitants turned to electric space heaters to fill the gap, but these overloaded the grid, leading to rolling blackouts. Some attempted to reuse gas ovens as space heaters, accentuating the effects of a Russian gas boycott. Without liquid tap water, the sewer system also froze and burst a few days later.

The crisis was particularly urgent for the Ukrainian government, because parliament would hold elections in March. The authorities temporarily evacuated schoolchildren from the area to Crimea and Western Ukraine, but struggled to organize an extensive repair effort. Workers imported to repair the apartments found themselves in substandard housing with inconsistent meals. Nevertheless, immediate repair actions were complete by mid-February.

Later that year, President Yushchenko announced a plan to further harden the system against stress with a set of nine distributed boilers.

==== War in Donbas ====
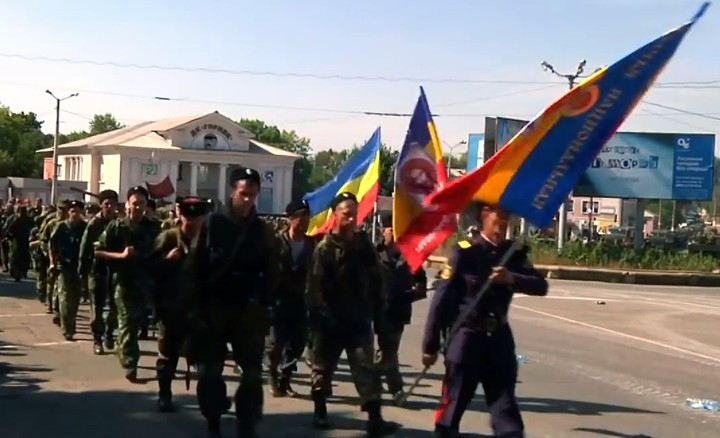
Members of Russia's Don Cossack National Guard, who were active in Alchevsk Raion.

On 5 April 2014, pro-Russian, Anti-Maidan protestors led by a city council deputy, Nikolai Boyko, were detained by the Alpha Group of the Security Service of Ukraine (SBU). Due to this, protestors picketed the SBU building in the city and blocked the streets with tires, which temporarily stopped traffic for the day, although the detainees were released the same day. It was described as one of the first such instances of pro-Russian protestors picketing and also trying to seize SBU buildings. Following the start of the War in the Donbas, where pro-Russian separatists captured and occupied several towns in the Luhansk Oblast as part of the self-declared Luhansk People's Republic (LNR/LPR), Alchevsk would remain relatively quiet until late April 2014. On 30 April 2014, the Alchevsk Executive Committee Building was suddenly surrounded by around 100 members of the pro-Russian volunteer militias known as the Alchevsk Guard and Alchevsk Druzhina. Together, they lowered the Ukrainian flag and replaced it with the LNR's flag. Following this, then mayor Volodymyr Kosyuha agreed to meet with them. The separatists demanded that the mayor to organise the proposed 11 May referendum regarding the area's accession to the LNR. It was agreed between the mayor and separatists that a working group would be created to draft a memorandum of cooperation between the city and LNR afterwards.

By early May, the separatists also captured the city's military commissariat. The battalions were then stationed at the commandant's office in the building, and they introduced a citywide curfew. On 11 May, the referendum by the LNR was held in the city. The highly disputed results led to Alchevsk being recognised de facto as part of the LNR, although de jure it is still considered part of Ukraine by the Ukrainian government itself and the international community. On 25 May, the intended date of the early Ukrainian presidential election that was due to the ousting of Viktor Yanukovych in the earlier Euromaidan protests, voting was not held within the city. De jure the city was part of electoral district no. 107, but all polling stations were closed in the city by the militias after the LNR prohibited preparation for the Ukrainian presidential election on so-called LNR territory. Notices were posted on polling stations by the militias that they would not operate, and armed men broke into them and ransacked the places.

In June, separatists finally seized the city's SBU building, thus maintaining full control over Alchevsk. The following month, on 22 July, the LNR's Prizrak Brigade under Oleksandr Mozgovyi retreated into Alchevsk, having retreated from Lysychansk when Ukraine liberated the city. There were now around 1,000 armed separatists residing in the city. Over the following weeks after the brigade's arrival, some residents began fleeing en masse and it was reported that almost half of Alchevsk was at the station. However, on 26 July, all intercity railway services from Alchevsk were closed due to the war. Some protestors also picketed outside the hotel where the brigade was staying, demanding that they leave, while both the AMK and city authorities also requested that the brigade leave. The brigade, however, said they would not in order to protect the city.

On 28 August 2014, Alchevsk was heavily shelled for the first time by artillery and BM-21 Grad rockets at 5 a.m. Both Ukraine and the separatists blamed each other for the shelling. Mortar fire and explosions were heard throughout the city, and it was confirmed by the ATO that LNR fighters were still present within the city. One person was confirmed to be killed, with multiple injured. A supply column from Russia arrived carrying ammunition and equipment in October.

Over the following years after the start of the occupation, unlike other cities under occupation, there was no significant crisis afterwards. The only main continued crisis was with the water supply, which had been a problem since 2014, as water supply scheduling was not maintained, leading to water that was unfit for drinking according to people from the Yellow Ribbon movement. The main employer of the city, Alchevsk Metallurgical Complex, continued to operate in the territory. However, in 2017, a pro-Ukrainian blockade started that stopped railway lines and roads transporting coal because it was claimed to be stolen goods, which forced the plant to temporarily stop. Production was restarted forcibly by the LNR in 2018. In June 2020, as part of the reform of administrative divisions in Ukraine, Alchevsk was made the administrative center of Alchevsk Raion. This new status is not recognized by the pro-Russian occupation authorities.

==== Russian invasion of Ukraine ====
Following the start of the Russian invasion of Ukraine in February 2022, many male residents of the city, including plant workers, were forcibly mobilised into the LNR, and eventually Russian Army against Ukraine. After the 2022 Russian annexations of Southern and Eastern Ukraine, the city is now claimed by Russia itself. This annexation has been rejected by the global community as a breach of international law.

Since then, the area around Alchevsk had seen full-scale fighting, with Russian-installed local officials repeatedly accusing Ukrainian armed forces of shelling the city. Ukraine has said that it is only striking military targets, and not civilian ones. On 18 December 2022, Ukrainian forces carried out their first large-scale strike on Alchevsk, causing a fire to break out at a fuel storage depot that was said to be used by Russian forces, according to the Strategic Communications Directorate. In January 2026, Alchevsk lost both centralized heating and electricity, which Oleksii Kharchenko said was not due to shelling but neglect of infrastructure, despite Russian officials having reported readiness for heating during the previous year. In March 2026, a massive strike struck the Alchevsk Metallurgical Complex. The General Staff of the Ukrainian Armed Forces said that the complex was involved in the manufacturing of shell casings and the repair of armored steel for Russian military equipment. A few months later, in June 2026, a drone strike hit the city's railway station, intended to destroy the railway infrastructure.

== Government and politics ==
=== Government ===
In the de jure political system of Alchevsk, the city was administered as a city of regional significance by Ukraine from its designation until 2020, when the system was abolished during administrative reform. Due to this designation, it had its own elected city council (a mis'krada), which was chaired by the mayor. Prior to the abolishment, the mis'krada was known as the Alchevsk City Council and was located at Vulytsia Lenina, 48, and it consisted of 60 deputies. After the abolishment, the city became part of Alchevsk urban hromada, which has its own elected council.

After the War in the Donbas, the city de facto became part of the pro-Russian, separatist Luhansk People's Republic. Until 2023, the LPR continued to use the Alchevsk City Council to administer the city. In March 2023, however, following Russia's annexation of the LPR, new formations replaced the old city council with the new de facto Council of the City District of Alchevsk. It was also by this law that the city became de facto designated as a city of republican significance.

=== Politics ===
By the late 1980s, just before the collapse of the Soviet Union, the Communist Party of Ukraine for Alchevsk's party organisation recorded 18,000 members nationally. However, only 9,000 resided in the city. The metallurgical combine's party organisation had the largest number of members in the city.

Following the creation of an independent Ukraine, the city's voters heavily favoured proponents of continued close ties to Russia. After the pro-Russian Party of Regions gained power in the 2000s, the party held a majority in the city council. In the 2010 Ukrainian local elections, the party held 50 of the 60 seats on the city council. The only other ten seats were also held by pro-Russian parties: five for the Communist Party of Ukraine, two for Strong Ukraine, and two for the Progressive Socialist Party of Ukraine. Only one seat, which was for Front for Change (which eventually merged to the pro-European Batkivshchyna), was not from a pro-Russian political party.

==== Mayors ====
Following the establishment of an independent Ukraine, Mykola Kyrychenko became mayor of the city. He had also held this role during the Soviet Union. In 2001, he joined the Party of Regions following its creation in the region. After being elected for three terms, he was replaced by Volodymyr Chub, also of the Party of Regions, due to the heating disaster in 2006. Chub was previously a deputy of the Luhansk Regional Council representing Alchevsk. He was re-elected in 2010 and again in 2012 with 48.08% of the vote.

In June 2013, Volodymyr Kosyuha of the Party of Regions won the by-election for mayor after Volodymyr Chub resigned to become a People's Deputy of Ukraine. The turnout for the election was low, at 22.34%, and Kosyuha was elected with 50.95% of the votes. His main opponent was Oleksandr Bebeshko of the Communist Party of Ukraine, who received 16.13% of the vote. In 2014, after the city's seizure by the Luhansk People's Republic, by decree of the republic, Kosyuha was de facto replaced with Natalia Pyatkova as mayor. Formerly, since 2013, she had been first deputy mayor. She continued to hold this position until February 2022, when she was dismissed. It was said she was dismissed due to a lack of confidence. It was rumoured, but not confirmed, that this was associated with a change in leadership at the metallurgical plant, as her husband, who had previously worked there, was put under house arrest. She was replaced with Albert Apshev, who was serving as first deputy mayor of Kadiivka prior to the appointment. On 11 March 2025, Apshev announced that he was resigning in order to take on a new job. In his place, the first deputy mayor, Svetlana Grebenkov, became acting mayor of the city.

List of mayors of Alchevsk:

Ukrainian Soviet Socialist Republic

During the Soviet-era, the office of mayor was known as the "Chairman of the City Executive Committee".

- Kurylin Fyodor, March 1919–? (Note: Kurylin also served as revkom chairman as part of the underground resistance to German occupation in November 1918.)
- Klimashevsky M.V., Rudnev A.A., early 1920s (served dually)
- Gruzin I., first half of 1920s
- Strokotenko, first half of 1920s
- Popov, 1926–1933
- Shmidt, 1933–1936
- Burmistrov, 1936–1937
- Kholokholenko A.I., unknown time
- Rutkovskiy, 1937–1940
- Burmistrov, 1941 (Note: Burmistrov is at least mentioned as city council chairman on 22 June 1941, during a mass meeting the day that Nazi Germany invaded. How long he was mayor is unknown.)

From 1941 to 1943 the city was occupied by Nazi Germany as part of Reichskommissariat Ukraine. The civilian mayor elected by the Ortskommandantur was a VETs engineer known as Pivovarov. Mayors were known as burgomasters.

- Kryvokon Oleksandr Havrylovych, 1943 (interim, after liberation)
- Tuhayev Dmytro Kalynovych, 1943–1956
- Ivanov Serhiy Kostyantynovych, 1956–1960
- Nedayvodov Kostiantyn Serhiyovych, 1960–1973
- Kotykhov Leonid Petrovych, 1973–1988
- Kyrychenko Mykola Yehorovych, 1988–1991

Independent Ukraine

Kyrychenko kept the Soviet-era title until 1998, when the name was transitioned into mayor.

- Kyrychenko Mykola Yehorovych, 1991–2006 (Party of Regions)
- Volodymyr Chub, 2006–2013 (Party of Regions)
- Volodymyr Kosyuha, 2013–2014 (Party of Regions)

Luhansk People's Republic (de facto)

From December 2014 to September 2022, the mayor of the city was installed by the pro-Russian, self-proclaimed Luhansk People's Republic. Ukraine and the UN do not recognise these appointments.

- Natalia Pyatkova, 2 December 2014 – 2 February 2022
- Albert Apshev, 3 February 2022 – 30 September 2022

Russia (de facto)

During the middle of Apshev's term in September 2022, the LPR was annexed by Russia after a highly disputed referendum. This is not recognised by the international community.

- Albert Apshev, 30 September 2022 – 11 March 2025
- Svetlana Grebenkova, 11 March 2025 – present

== Geography ==
=== Climate ===
Under the Köppen–Geiger climate classification system, Shakhove has a moderate hot summer continental climate (Dfb).

During the summer months, Alchevsk is warm, with the average temperature in June being 20 °C (68 °F) and July being 23 °C (73 °F). The record high recorded in the city is around 40 °C (104 °F), which was recorded in August. The coldest months are during the wintertime in January and February, when the average temperature is around −6 °C (21 °F) in January and −6 °C (21 °F) in February. The record low recorded in the city is around −38 °C (−36 °F), which was recorded in February. The wettest month by average precipitation is June, which has an average of 61mm of precipitation, with August being the driest at around 34mm of precipitation. The annual precipitation averages to be around 543mm per year.

Climate data for Alchevsk (1991–2024)
Month	Jan	Feb	Mar	Apr	May	Jun	Jul	Aug	Sep	Oct	Nov	Dec	Year
Record high °C (°F)	9.9 (49.8)	16.1 (61.0)	21.0 (69.8)	29.1 (84.4)	35.2 (95.4)	37.0 (98.6)	39.7 (103.5)	39.8 (103.6)	36.8 (98.2)	31.5 (88.7)	21.9 (71.4)	12.3 (54.1)	39.8 (103.6)
Daily mean °C (°F)	−6.1 (21.0)	−4.8 (23.4)	0.7 (33.3)	8.8 (47.8)	15.1 (59.2)	20.3 (68.5)	23.3 (73.9)	22.7 (72.9)	15.9 (60.6)	8.4 (47.1)	1.1 (34.0)	−3.9 (25.0)	8.5 (47.3)
Record low °C (°F)	−35.3 (−31.5)	−38.1 (−36.6)	−18.9 (−2.0)	−6.1 (21.0)	−3.1 (26.4)	2.4 (36.3)	7.7 (45.9)	6.9 (44.4)	−5 (23)	−7.2 (19.0)	−20.2 (−4.4)	−35.6 (−32.1)	−38.1 (−36.6)
Average precipitation mm (inches)	44 (1.7)	39 (1.5)	40 (1.6)	43 (1.7)	55 (2.2)	61 (2.4)	53 (2.1)	34 (1.3)	42 (1.7)	42 (1.7)	42 (1.7)	48 (1.9)	543 (21.4)

== Demographics ==
=== Population ===
According to the 2001 Ukrainian Census, the only official nationwide census that has been taken in an independent Ukraine, the population of the city stood at 119,193 people. The population of the city grew rapidly in the early 1900s, especially in the time from 1926 to 1939. The city's population hit its peak at 127,300 people recorded in 1989. Since then, the population of the city has continued to steadily decline. The most recent estimate of the population by the Ukrainian government was done in 2022, which found a population of 106,062 (2022 estimate)..

Historical population

Year	Pop.	±% p.a.
1897	9,308	—
1923	16,018	+2.11%
1926	53,531	+49.51%
1939	97,561	+4.73%
1959	122,818	+1.16%
1970	119,756	−0.23%
1979	125,502	+0.52%
1989	127,300	+0.14%
1992	120,900	−1.70%
1998	119,193	−0.24%
2001	119,193	+0.00%
2003	117,617	−0.66%
2004	116,954	−0.56%
2005	116,610	−0.29%
2006	115,920	−0.59%

Year	Pop.	±% p.a.
2007	115,358	−0.48%
2008	114,694	−0.58%
2009	113,980	−0.62%
2010	113,002	−0.86%
2011	112,071	−0.82%
2012	111,360	−0.63%
2013	110,474	−0.80%
2014	109,772	−0.64%
2015	109,377	−0.36%
2016	109,236	−0.13%
2017	108,024	−1.11%
2018	107,438	−0.54%
2019	106,941	−0.46%
2020	106,500	−0.41%
2021	106,062	−0.41%

==== Ethnicity ====
According to the Ukrainian National Census in 2001, Alchevsk was split nearly evenly among Ukrainians and Russians ethnically. The city had an ethnic composition of Ukrainians at 51.57%, with a slightly smaller ethnic composition of Russians at 44.69%. The exact ethnic composition was as follows:

1. Ukrainians: 61,173 people, 51.57%
2. Russians: 52,999 people, 44.69%
3. Belarusians: 1,305 people, 1.10%
4. Armenians: 474 people, 0.40%
5. Tatars: 451 people, 0.38%
6. Azerbaijanis: 214 people, 0.18%
7. Jews: 214 people, 0.18%
8. Georgians: 178 people, 0.15%
9. Poles: 130 people, 0.11%
10. Moldovans: 130 people, 0.11%
11. Other or N/A: 582 people, 0.49%

Total: 119,193 people

Ethnic groups in Alchevsk
	percent
Ukrainians	51.57%
Russians	44.69%
Belarusians	1.10%

=== Languages ===
According to the Ukrainian National Census in 2001, Alchevsk's majority population had a mother tongue of Russian as their native language (83.6%), with a minority speaking Ukrainian as their mother tongue language (15.3%). The exact mother tongue language distribution is as follows:

Native languages in Alchevsk
	percent
Russian	83.6%
Ukrainian	15.3%
Armenian	0.1%
Belarusian	0.1%
Romani	0.1%

== Economy ==
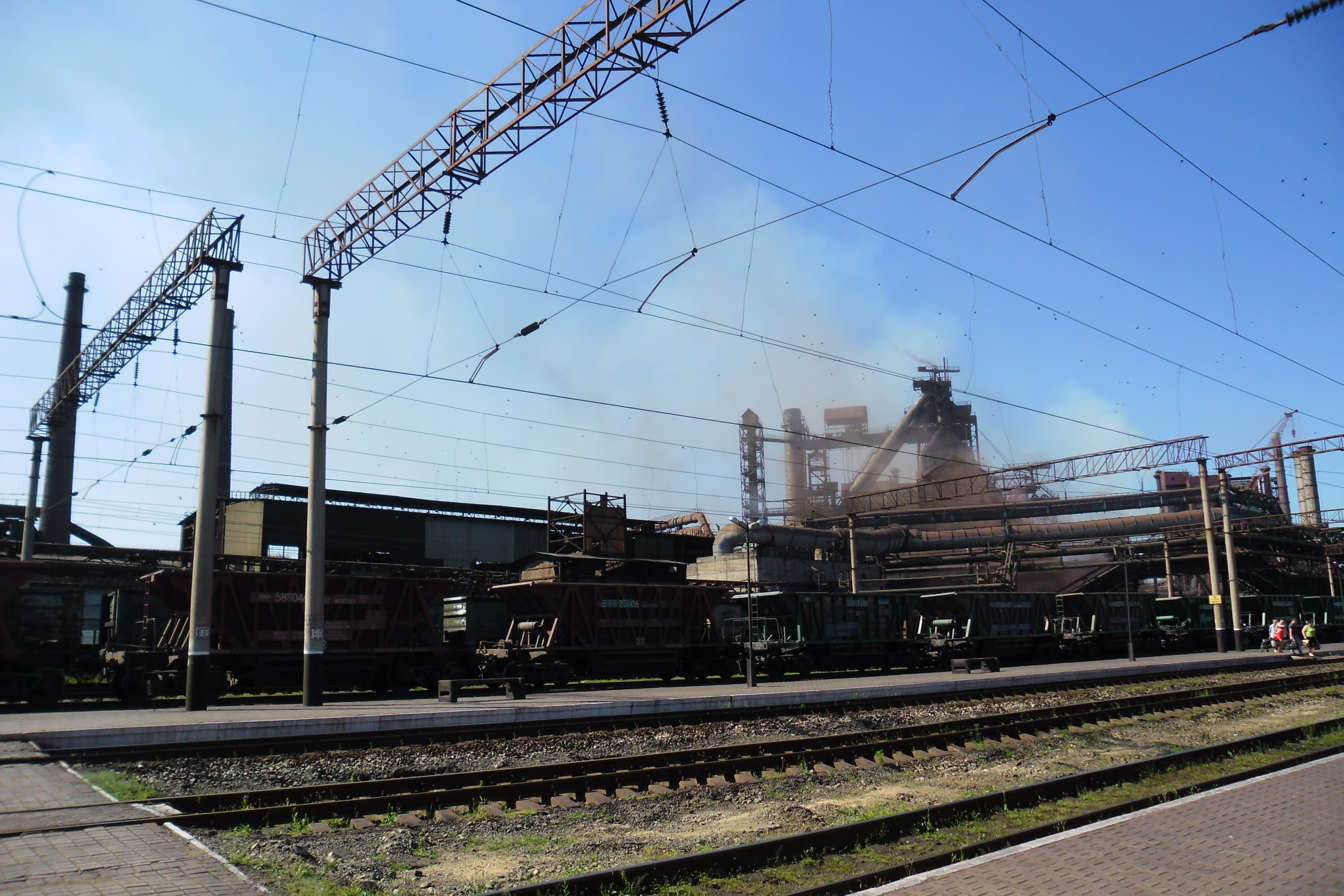
Alchevsk Metallurgical Complex

Prior to 2014, Alchevsk was the second-largest industrial producer in Luhansk Oblast, just after Luhansk. The city's economy is heavily tied to heavy industry, particularly ferrous metallurgy and the chemical industry. It is one of the largest metallurgical centres within the Donbas, although in recent years efforts have been made to diversify away from heavy industry and towards construction and building materials, woodworking, and printing among other things.

The city's economy primarily revolves around two businesses: the Alchevsk Metallurgical Complex and the Alchevsk Coke-Chemical Plant. The metallurgical complex was privatised in 1994 and co-owned by the Industrial Union of Donbas and the Interpipe Group, before fully coming under the ownership of the Industrial Union of Donbas in 2002. In 2014, the complex was the employer of 13,447 people in the city and was producing 2.4 million tonnes of steel a year. The complex temporarily ceased production in 2015, before being taken over by Vneshtorgservis, which is owned by Serhiy Kurchenko, before restarting production in 2017.

Another enterprise that was formerly located in the city was the "Metals and Polymers" company, which was opened in April 2010. It produced galvanised and polymer-coated steel, and employed around 200 people. It was financed by Alfa-Bank. The company stopped operating after 2014. The other notable enterprise, the Steel Shot Plant, which produced steel shots continued to work in Alchevsk.

== Infrastructure ==
=== Transportation ===
==== Local transportation ====
===== Trolleybuses =====
The trolleybus network of the city is owned and operated by the enterprise KP Alchevskpastrans. It first opened on 26 September 1954 and closed on 16 July 2022. The fare before its closure was 8 rubles. It was formerly the first trolleybus system in Luhansk Oblast, the second in the Donbas (after Donetsk), and the tenth in Ukraine. Its peak was in 1991 when there was 9 routes and 117 vehicles.

====== History ======
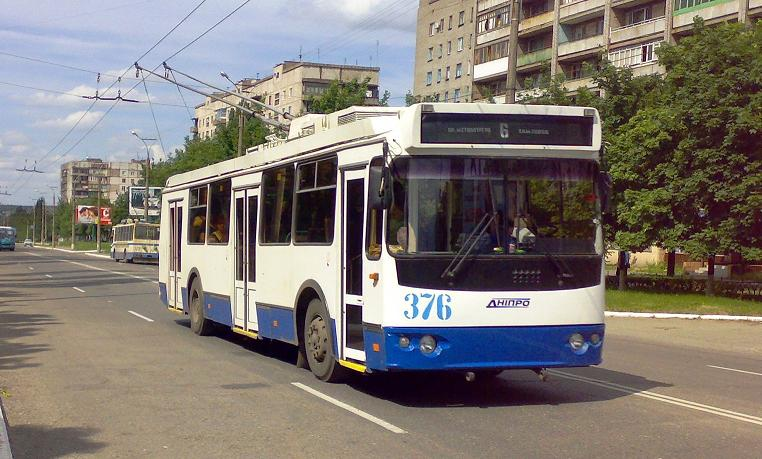
The sole Dnipro-E187 on Gorky Street on route no. 4 in Alchevsk.

After World War II, there were talks of a tram line being planned, but this was abandoned in the early 1950s in favour of the creation of trolleybus routes. In order to start the route, in April 1954 five MTB-82 that were meant for Luhansk were procured, and a month later on 28 May 1954 the Voroshylovsk Trolleybus Management was established in order to oversee its implementation. Throughout the summer of 1954, drivers were trained in the cities of Kyiv, Odesa, and Donetsk, in order to be able to operate the routes in Alchevsk. The system began on 24 September 1954, with a single route that ran from Chapayev Street to the entrance of the Alchevsk Metallurgical Complex. Between 1953 and 1957, construction also began on a trolleybus tunnel that was 400 metres long beneath the Alchevsk Metallurgical Complex due to its expanding size, with the help of a bridge sent from the Moscow Metro. It opened up to road vehicles in 1957 and trolleybuses in 1958, and was the only trolleybus tunnel in Ukraine at the time.

Throughout the Soviet period, the network expanded significantly from its original one route. By 1991, just before Ukrainian independence, the fleet consisted of 117 vehicles with nine different routes. Following the collapse of the Soviet Union, however, state funding to the program ended. Due to this, the fleet began to decline. In 1992, nine vehicles were written off, a year later ten, and during this time no acquisition of new vehicles for the system was ever made. By 1996, there were 60 trolleybuses operating within the city with a total length of 72 kilometers and about 6 million passengers transported each year. By 2013, unpaid wages became common for the workers, which led to strikes.

Following the takeover by the LPR, the trolleybus system continued to decline. Route 5's contact wire was dismantled in January 2014 due to what was cited as emergency conditions, and so the route was effectively scrapped. By 2019, only seven to nine trolleybuses were still in regular use, with one being assigned to each route. As of early 2020, the fleet was around 40 vehicles, nearly all from the Soviet era. The newest vehicles to be acquired were all from before 2014: two YuMZ-T2s from 2005, three ZiU-682s from 2007, with the newest trolleybus being a Dnipro-E187 produced by Pivdenmash from 2008. In early July 2022, the sole trolleybus depot, which was being primarily used by then to repair Russian military equipment, was struck by a Ukrainian missile in an attack that destroyed nearly all of its buildings and destroyed most of the remaining fleet of Alchevsk. Due to this, service was decided to be ceased on 16 July 2022. The dismantling of the trolleybus network began soon after in August 2022, and it was finally completed in August 2023.

====== Former routes ======
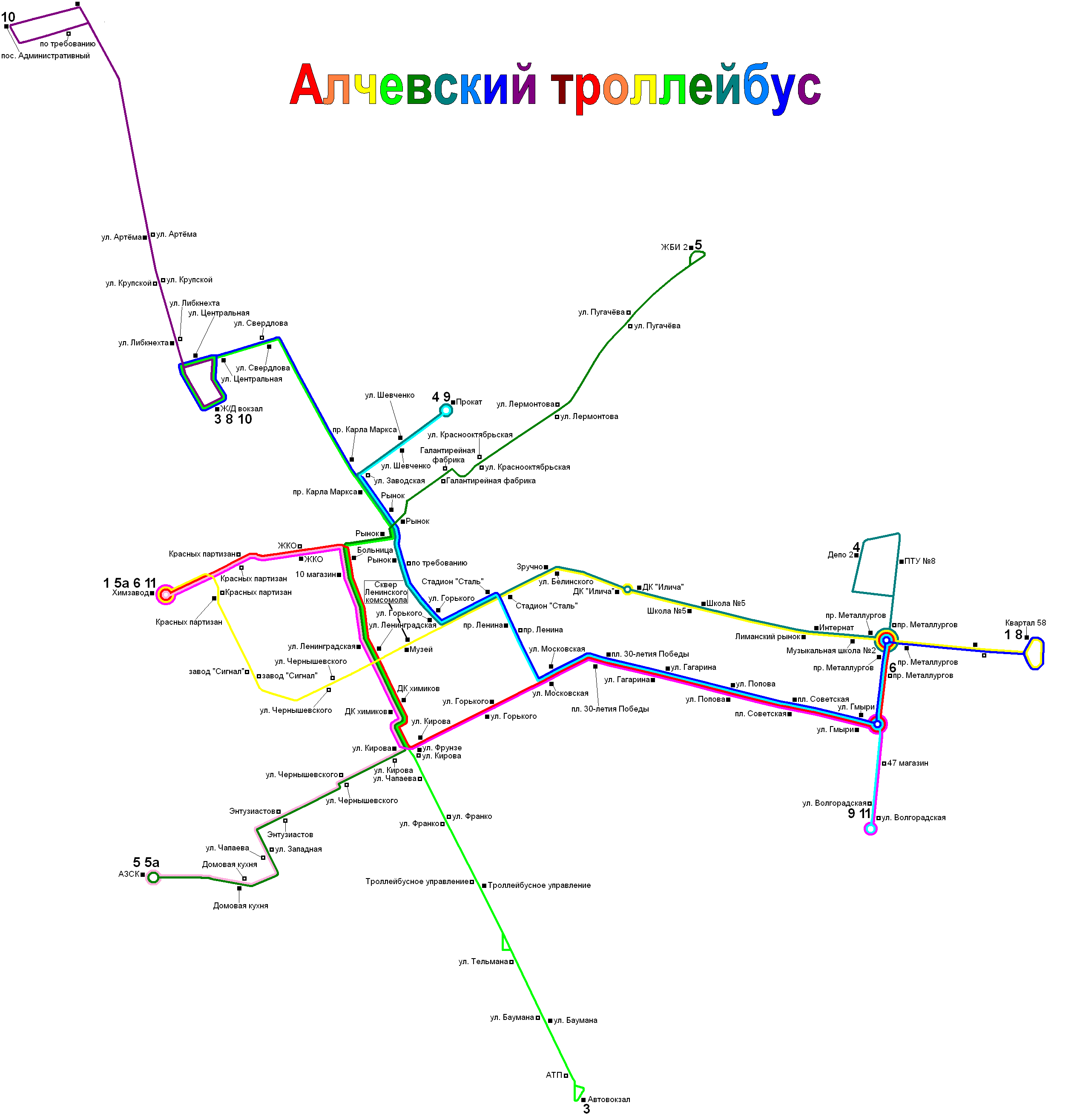
A map of trolleybus routes in the city in 2008.

Before the 2014 occupation, this was the list of the eight routes operated:

- Route No. 1: Sports Goods to Alchevskoks OJSC
- Route No. 3: Bus Station to Train Station
- Route No. 4: Roundabout at Metallurgov Avenue to Alchevsk Metallurgical Complex (via Lipovenko Street)
- Route No. 5: Roundabout at OJSC "AZZBL" (within Vasylivka neighbourhood) to Roundabout at CJSC "AZSK"
- Route No. 6: Roundabout at Metallurgov Avenue to Alchevskoks OJSC
- Route No. 8: Roundabout at Metallurgov Avenue to Train Station
- Route No. 9: Roundabout at Volgogradska Street to Alchevsk Metallurgical Complex
- Route No. 11: Roundabout at Volgogradska Street to Alchevskoks OJSC

===== City buses =====
As of 2017, there were around several dozen Marshrutka operating within the city. They were primarily older Soviet buses produced by GAZelle and Pavlovo Bus Factory, and the fare charged for rides was 10 rubles. They run from 5 a.m. to 8 p.m., primarily to serve workers of the Alchevsk Metallurgical Complex. In April 2021, seven Articulated buses were delivered from Saint Petersburg by Russia to provide "humanitarian assistance", however, only two were put in use due a shortage of drivers who were qualified to drive them. In June 2023, another ten new city buses entered service due to complaints about transport in the outer layers of the city, with the LPR saying they expected ten more shortly after.

There is also an inter-city bus terminal that is meant for long-distance travel. It is located in the village right next to Alchevsk, Perevalsk, on the Highway M04 bypass there. It serves mainly destinations in Russia following the suspension of Ukrainian routes in 2014.

==== Roads and bridges ====
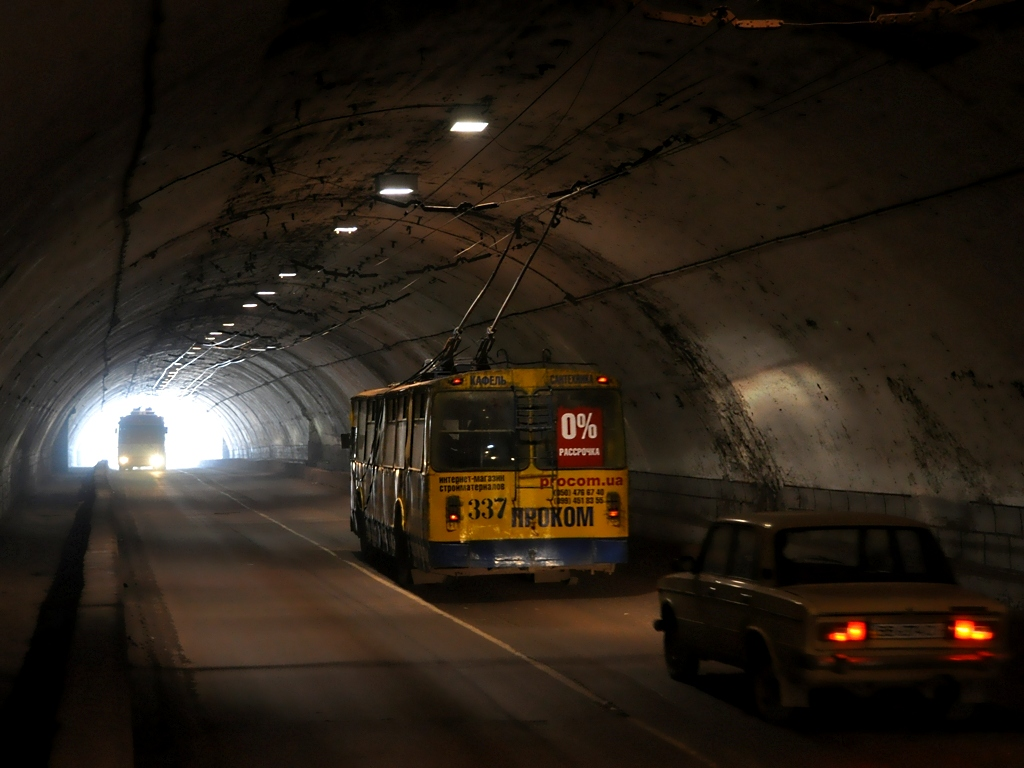
Automobile tunnel in Alchevsk.

The city goes through the M-04 highway via the Znamianka–Luhansk–Izvaryne route, which passes through Alchevsk. On the segment between Pavlohrad and Alchevsk the road is two lanes wide, which widens to four lanes going from Alchevsk to Luhansk. In late 2021, M-04 was merged with M-12 to make Motorway M-30, which is part of European route E50. Since the 2022 Russian invasion, the route along the M-04 highway has been under constant drone fire according to the 3rd Army Corps.

==== Railways ====
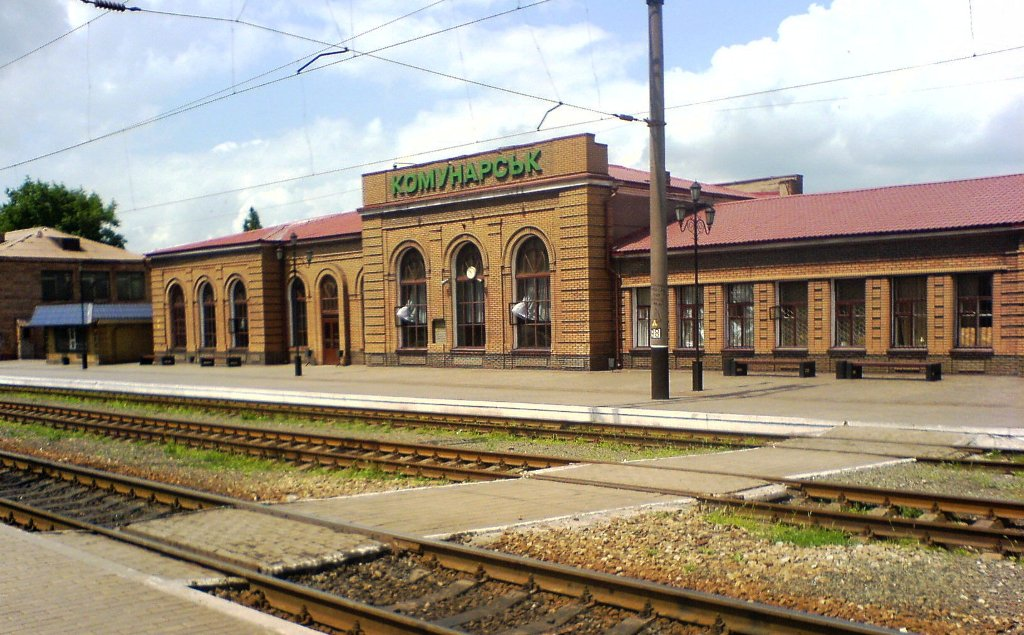
The railway station building in Alchevsk.

The main railway station of the city is the intermediate station of Alchevsk, which was formerly known as Kommunark until 2025, when the Cabinet of Ministers of Ukraine renamed it as part of decommunisation. It was formerly a station of Donetsk Railways, and was located on the Debaltseve–Rodakove line. The segment that connected Debaltseve with Alchevsk was electrified in 2005.

Following the War in the Donbas, all long-distance train services were temporarily stopped. The only routes that continued were suburban services going from Luhansk–Debaltseve and Luhansk–Manuiivka, which had stops at the station. In July 2016, a major fire on the track near the station damaged 300 metres of the track, which briefly stopped services for a month. In May 2023, following the Russian annexation of the LPR, the railways in the area came under the new administration of Railways of Novorossiya. The station was previously part of the Russian-claimed assets of Donetsk Railways.

==== Air ====
There are no airports located within the city. The closest one is in the city of Luhansk at the Luhansk International Airport, which is 20 km south of the city center. However, the airport was completely destroyed during the War in the Donbas. It had, prior to this, been closed since June 2014 by official decree.

=== Energy ===
The primary energy infrastructure that serves the city is a gas-turbine power station owned by PJSC "Ekoenergy". It is located within the Alchevsk Metallurgical Complex. It was developed as a project of the Industrial Union of Donbas, and received additional foreign funding, including $150 million from the European Bank for Reconstruction and Development, $120 million from the Japan Bank for International Cooperation, and the Industrial Union's own funding. The estimated total cost of the project was $383 million in 2007, and it would provide a capacity of 303 MW. The power station generates electricity using blast furnace gases from the complex and coke oven gases from the coke plant. In May 2013, the first unit of the power station was completed, providing 303 MW, but the total cost had grown to around $675 million by this time. The first station used Mitsubishi turbines and was described as one of the first in the Commonwealth of Independent States (CIS) to generate electricity via processing waste gases. It was confirmed at the time that the station would produce around 2.5 billion kWh per year, which would fully cover the metallurgical complex's own needs with surplus for the open market and city. It was included on a list of electricity producers over which the Ukrainian government did not have control in 2015.

== Education ==
=== Primary and secondary education ===
There are multiple different secondary school types. These include numbered general schools, specialised schools, gymnasiums, lyceums, collegiums, and УВК schools, which are meant to combine primary and secondary schooling in the same building. The list of gymnasium & specialised schools includes:

- Alchevsk Collegium No. 1 named after Khrystyna Alchevska. Opened in 1907 first as a factory educational institution, and in 1911 it switched to becoming an educational institution for secondary schooling.
- Alchevsk Social-Economic Gymnasium
- Alchevsk Gymnasium named after Hero of the Soviet Union Pyotr Nikolaevich Lipovenko
- Alchevsk Gymnasium named after Vladimir Nikolaevich Onufrienko. Founded as Kommunarskaya Secondary School No. 9 in 1971, renamed in 1991 to Alchevsk. It was later renamed to School Gymnasium No. 9 after acquiring gymnasium status, and in 2017 was named after Onufrienko.
- Alchevsk Information-Technology Lyceum. It was originally opened in 1990 as Secondary School No. 4, until it acquired the status of a gymnasium in 2005.
- Alchevsk Specialised Physics-Mathematics School No. 22
- Alchevsk Cossack Cadet Corps named after General Matvei Ivanovich Platov. It is a military school.

The following are УВК schools, meaning they are educational-upbringing complexes where students attend both their primary and secondary schooling at:

- UVK Voskhozhdeniye
- UVK Nadezhda
- UVK Rostok

The following are standard secondary schools, which use lettering:

- School No. 3 (named after Nikolai Babanin). The school was founded in 1934, but was closed from 1969 to 1972. It has been named after Babanin since 1991; previously, it was named after Nikolay Chernyshevsky.
- School No. 6
- School No. 7
- School No. 15
- School No. 17
- School No. 23
- School No. 24 (named after Hero of the Russian Federation Yuri Deineko). The school was named after him starting in 2017.

=== Higher education ===
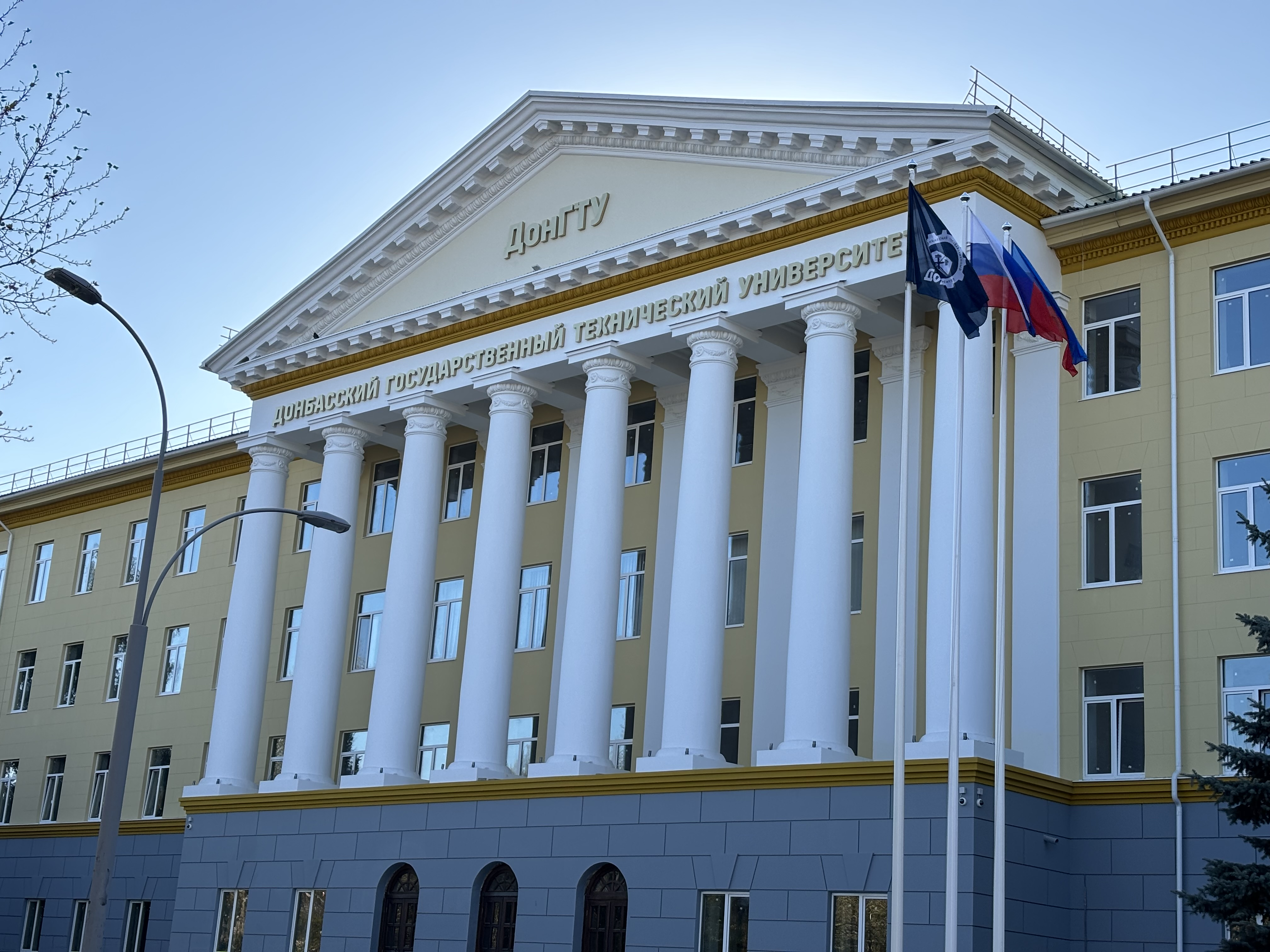
Donbas State Technical University pictured in 2024.

The Donbas State Technical University, founded in 1957, is located in Alchevsk. Due to the War in the Donbas, there is a split in the university. Half of the campus, which chose to move with the Ukrainian authorities, went to Lysychansk until 2018, when the university was merged into the East Ukrainian National University. The other half, including the original campus in Alchevsk, continues to operate in the LPR. It is the only higher education university located within the city.

== Media ==
Before 2014, the city had 10 newspapers and 3 magazines that were published in the city, although since then, this number has been significantly reduced.

=== Newspapers ===
The oldest newspaper in the city was the former plant newspaper for the metallurgical complex known as Makhovyk, which was first published in 1925. In the late 1920s, it was renamed to Voroshylovets, and then to Za metall (For Metal) in 1961. It ran publications until the summer of 2014. The coke-chemical plant also formerly had its own newspaper, which started publishing in 1941 as Koksovyk, before then being renamed to Kokhimik in 1959.

The city's main newspaper to this day is known as Ogni. It was founded in 1930 as the Ukrainian-language newspaper Bilshovytskyi shlyakh (Bolshevik Path), before becoming Za kommunizm in 1952, Ogni kommunizma in 1965, and then Ogni after independence in 1991. Although the main distribution of the paper is to Alchevsk, it also distributes to nearby cities in Luhansk Oblast. It was designated as the city's official newspaper and has become a Russian-language weekly. The other big newspaper, prior to 2022, was known as RIO-Plyus. It was a weekly information newspaper that started in 2002 and, by 2016, had a circulation of 6,000 copies in Alchevsk. It was published every Wednesday and was also known for its advertising, publishing more than 500 advertisements per week. Publication was temporarily stopped from July to October 2014, when it then restarted, until it suddenly shut down at the end of 2022.

=== Radio ===
Radio broadcasting in Alchevsk started in 1945 for the editorial office of the city. It had seven radio nodes by 1956, and in 1990 a city radio editorial office was established within the city. It operated as a subdivision of the broadcasting association for Luhansk, and it began officially broadcasting in January 1991. It became independent in 1997. Prior to 2014, it operated a 15-minute daily local newscast on air. Starting in 2016, a new station was launched for the city on 99.9 FM that was known as "Alchevsk Radio". Under this format, it broadcast 24 hours a day and covered news, weather, and music. In 2020, it became part of the state enterprise "Luhanmedia" under the LNR.

=== Television ===
A television station for the city began in April 1995 as ASKET. It broadcast four times daily prior to 2014. In February 2021, it was renamed to "Rodnoy Alchevsk", and it became part of "Luhanmedia", like the radio station and Ogni.

== Culture ==
=== Attractions ===
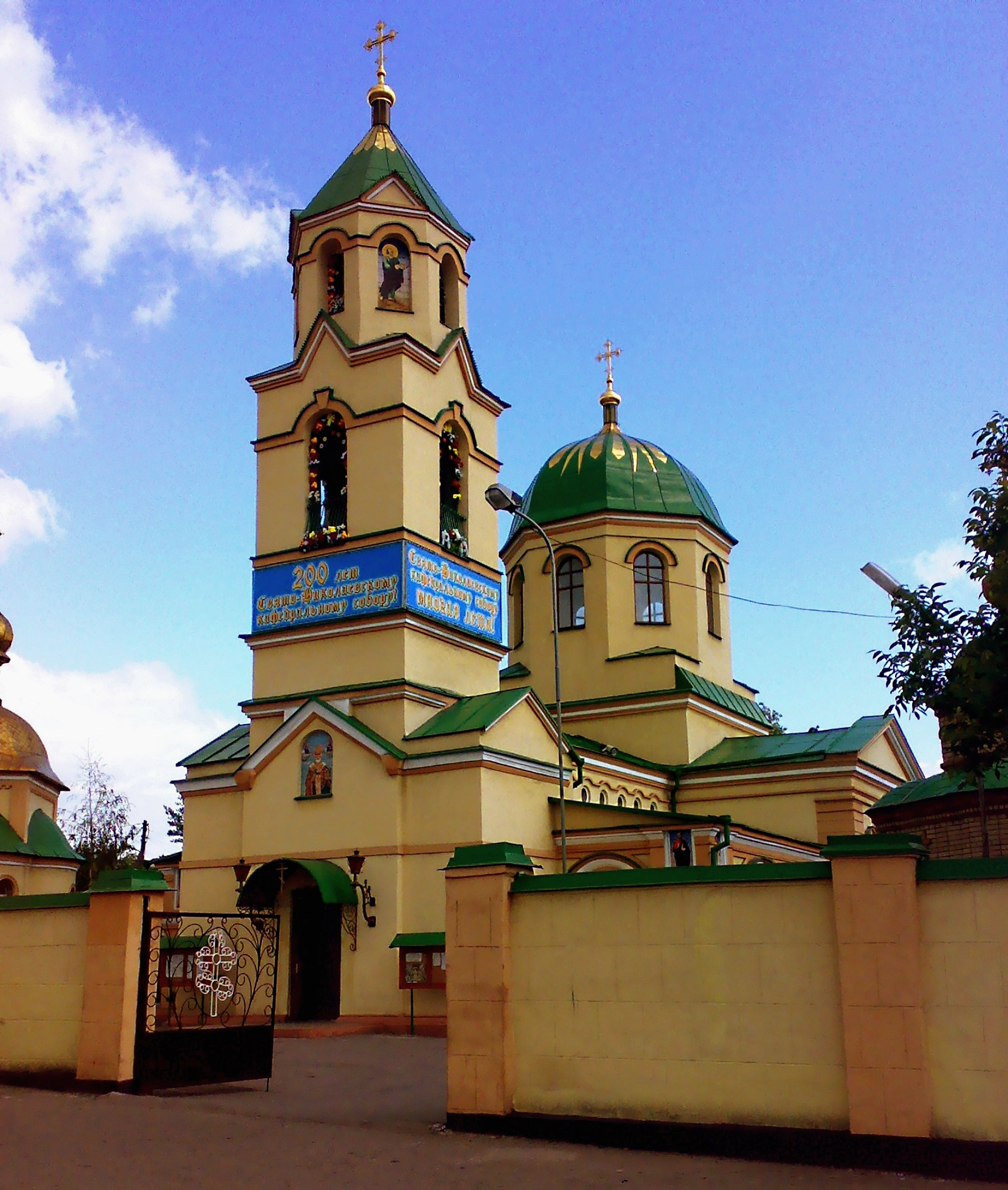
St. Nicholas Cathedral, the oldest church within the city. It is located within the Old City.

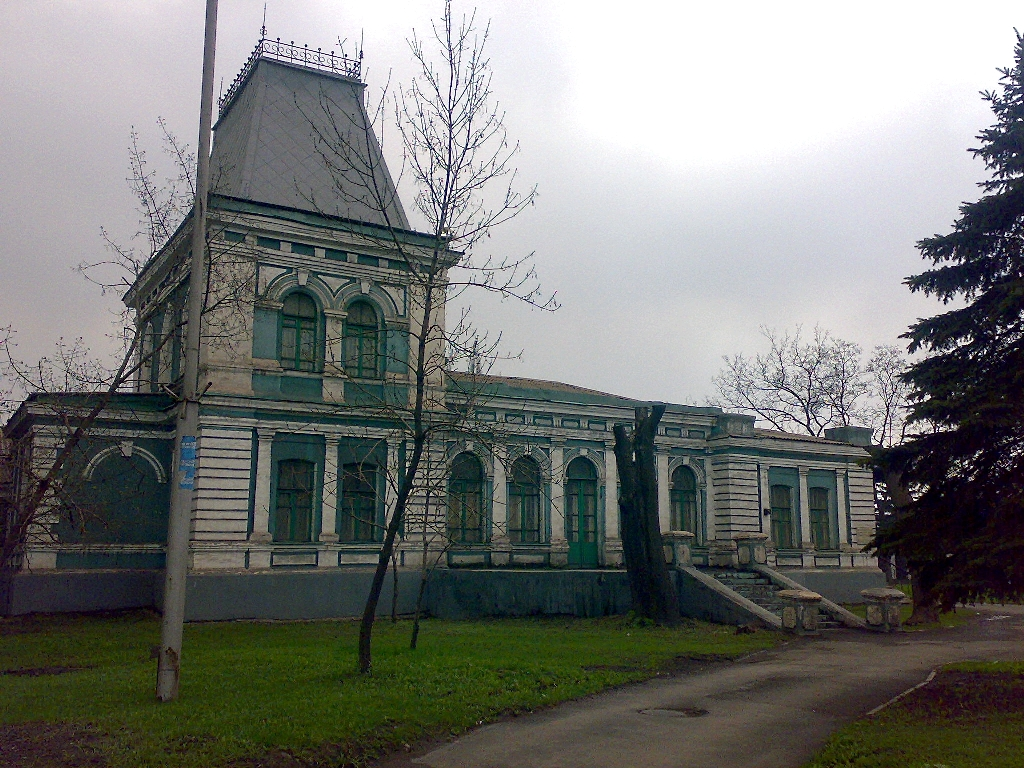
Director house's of the Alchevsk Metallurgical Complex.

The Old City, which is south of the steel plant, contains most of Alchevsk's historical buildings. Within the Old City is Saint Nicholas's Cathedral, which is the oldest church within the city. It originated in 1808 within Vasylivka as a single-altar church, but was expanded with two transepts in 1899. It was eventually closed during the Soviet era and used as a dairy factory in the 1930s and as a hospital briefly during World War II, before returning to religious use in Ukraine. The bells within the church were reinstalled in 1990, and a new bell-tower was added in 1992. In the western area of the city, just outside the metallurgical complex, is a square that contains a bust of Alchevsky and also a memorial square to victims of fascism. The Museum of the History of the Alchevsk Metallurgical Complex is also located in this area, and is housed in a late 19th-century factory director's building.

The New City, which is south of the Old City, is where most of the city's parks and institutional buildings are. It is separated from the Old City by a creek known as Bila. The main boulevard of New City is known as Lenin Prospekt (also formerly Prospekt Myru), and is a three-kilometre avenue that goes form the Palace of Culture of Chemists in the western part of New City to the Palace of Metallurgists in the east. Construction on the avenue began in 1953 by Kharkiv Institute Ukrhorstroiproekt under city architect Leonid Fedosov, and it took nearly 32 years to complete. The buildings lining the street used a similar style to the city of Leningrad, which is why the area was known as "little Leningrad". In the central area of the avenue is a baroque fountain that was constructed in the late 1950s. At the end of the avenue is an obelisk that is locally known as the Spire and was erected in order to commemorate the victory over the Nazis.

The Park of Culture and Recreation named Victory is the main park within the city. It underwent renovation in 2012, which replaced its pavement, installed benches, and added new paintings. The Palace of Metallurgists was constructed in 1972 and houses 17 creative associations. Another main attraction in the area is Kino Metalurh, which was built between 1946 and 1950. It is a cinema that has a 1,100-seat capacity and was designed under A. Skoryk with the company Voroshylohrad Oblproekt. It was notable for receiving a second-degree diploma in 1950 for the best civil structure in the Ukrainian SSR. The foyer area of the cinema contains a parterre in use for musicians, with the halls having decorated stucco. In the newer, more northern part of New City within the Lyman district are the municipal court building, the city hall, and the central library. There are also two recently built churches in the area: Saint George's Church (built in 2000–01), and the Church of Martyrs Faith, Hope, and Love, and their Mother Wisdom (built in 1996–2000).

=== Museums ===
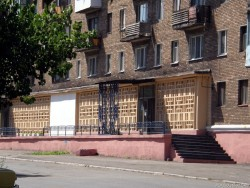
The main museum of the city, the City Historical Museum of Alchevsk.

The City Historical Museum of Alchevsk is the main museum of the city, and it covers the history of Alchevsk. It was founded in 1967 on a voluntary basis by the decision of the Alchevsk City Council, and was fully opened to the public with exhibitions in 1970. Since 1982, it has been affiliated with and is a department of the Luhansk Regional Museum of Local Lore. It has around 10,000 items in storage and is 574.4 square meters in area. It is divided into four sections: the history of the city from its founding to the 1940s, Alchevsk during World War II, Alchevsk from the 1940s to the 1960s, and the modern era and art. Notable exhibitions that it carries are of the history of the Alchevsky family, who are the founders of the city, and an exhibition on Mykola Rudenko, who won the Shevchenko National Prize, and was born in nearby Yuriivka. There is also a smaller museum known as the Geological and Mineralogical Museum of DonSTU which exhibits minerals, fossils, and artificial stones.

=== City anthem ===
The lyrics to the city anthem were written by Vladimir Isaev, and the music was set by Viktor Kratko. The city anthem has stayed the same, as it was in use by Ukrainian authorities prior to 2014.

Russian lyrics

На Луганской земле занимается утро
И разлиться спешит голубою волной.
Пробуждается город спокойный и мудрый,
Весь в делах и заботах, Алчевск наш родной.

Здесь заря целый век полыхала,
И, как сталь, закалялась рука.
Славься, город огня и металла!
Славься, город Алчевск, на века!

Вот уж яркое солнце в высоком зените,
Время вновь бесконечную песню поет.
Не сгорая, сияет на вечном граните
Благородное, гордое имя твое.

В этом имени сила простого народа –
В нем надежда, в нем правда борьбы и труда.
И над ним никогда не закрыть небосвода!
На Луганской земле славен будет всегда!

Ukrainian lyrics

На Луганській землі прокидається ранок
І поспішає розлитися блакитною хвилею.
Прокидається місто спокійне й мудре,
Повне справ і турбот, наш рідний Алчевськ.

Тут зоря ціле століття палала,
І, як сталь, загартовувалася рука.
Слався, місто вогню й металу!
Слався, місто Алчевськ, на віки!

Ось уже яскраве сонце у високому зеніті,
Час знову безкінечну пісню співає.
Не згораючи, сяє на вічному граніті
Шляхетне, горде ім’я твоє.

У цьому імені сила простого народу –
У ньому надія, у ньому правда боротьби і праці.
І над ним ніколи не закрити небосхилу!
На Луганській землі славне буде завжди!

English translation

Morning breaks over the land of Luhansk,
And hastens to spread like a blue wave.
The calm and wise city awakens,
Busy with its affairs and cares, our beloved Alchevsk.

Here the dawn has blazed for a century,
And hands have been tempered like steel.
Be glorified, city of fire and metal!
Glory to you, city of Alchevsk, for all eternity!

Now the bright sun is high in the sky,
Time sings its endless song once more.
Unfading, your noble, proud name shines
Upon the eternal granite

In this name lies the strength of the common people-
In it is hope, in it is the truth of our struggle and labour.
And the heavens will never close over it!
On the land of Luhansk, it will always be glorious!

=== Coat of arms ===
The coat of arms from 1996. It is still de jure the coat of arms.

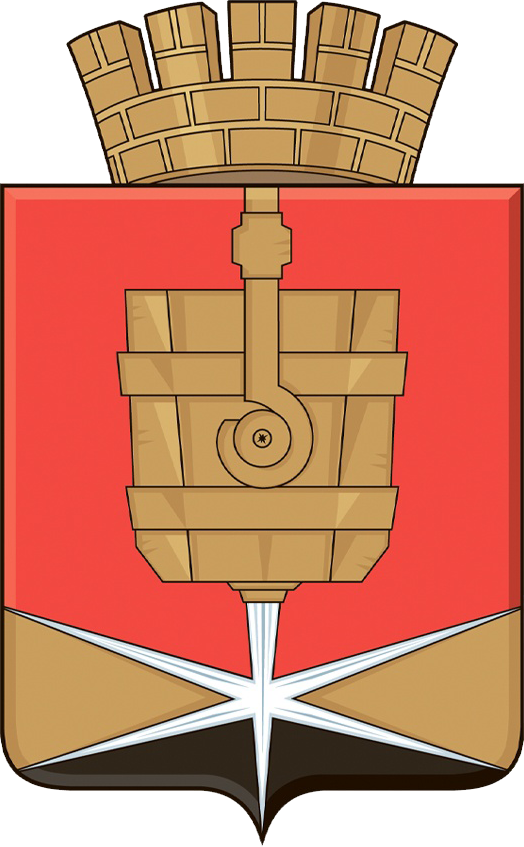
The coat of arms from 2024–present. It is the de facto coat of arms.

On 29 July 1983, the original coat of arms of the city was approved. The original coat had the state flag of the Ukrainian SSR on the back of a shield, an image of a ladle that is pouring metal, and a five-pointed star. Following the collapse of the Soviet Union, by City Council Order No. 44 on 2 February 1993, a new coat of arms was approved. The new coat of arms kept the ladle and metal due to its symbolisation of metallurgy for the city, and the form of it was still a shield, but added a blue field, and the ladle was changed to be golden. The coat of arms was again revised three years later on 16 April 1996 by decision No. 284. This version overlaid the previous 1993 shield on two crossed pokers that entwined a blue-and-yellow ribbon, and a golden tryzub was put on top of the shield. In addition, 1896 was put at the top of the ribbons, although this is not the city's official founding date.

Following the war in the Donbas, the new occupation authorities, the Luhansk People's Republic, modified the city's coat of arms (but only on billboards, as it was never made official by order). While they kept the shield the same, they changed the ribbons to the colours of the LPR, and they also put the state emblem on top in place of the tryzub. Following Russia's annexation of the LPR in 2022, it was decided to again change the coat of arms, and the coat of arms was completely redesigned. There is now a red field in the background; a ladle hanging on a hook, pouring silver that splits into five rays diverging into different directions. The ladle still represents metallurgy, but the base of it represents the coke industry, and the rays represent the workers' achievements.

=== Sports ===
==== Sports facilities ====
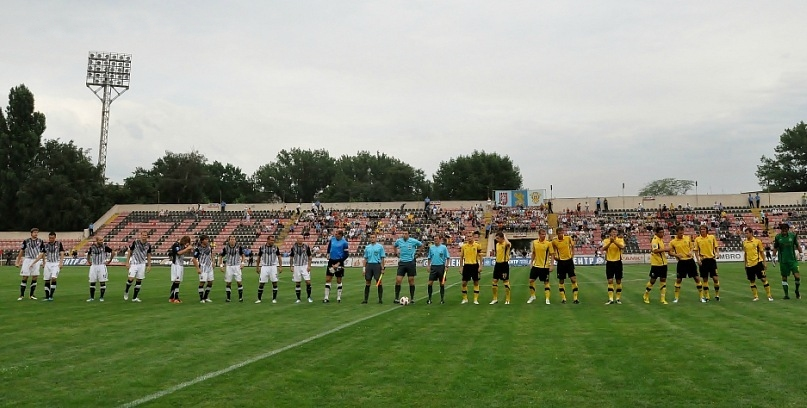
Stal Stadium

The primary stadium for the city where sports are played at is Stal Alchevsk Stadium. The capacity of the stadium is 9.2 thousand seats. The stadium was built in 1940 and also hosted matches against Dynamo Kyiv and Shaktar Donetsk, with Zorya Luhansk also playing some home matches at the stadium in the early 2010s. It was primarily used by FC Stal Alchevsk. However, due to the war in the Donbas, the stadium has been in a state of neglect, and no maintenance or match has been performed since 2014. According to reports, the pitch is now entirely uneven, the running track is worn down and overgrown, and the walls are all damaged and covered in graffiti. The entrance arch has also been damaged and is in ruins.

There are also other sports facilities: the Park Stadium, which was located in the 30th Anniversary Victory Park, the Budivelnyk Stadium, and the Stal Sports Palace. There are two youth sports schools, seven school sports fields, a swimming pool, and a yacht club.

==== FC Stal Alchevsk ====
Alchevsk is home to the football team FC Stal Alchevsk which participated in the Ukrainian First League, the second tier of national football competitions. In May 2013, the team was promoted to the Ukrainian Premier League for the next season. They had previously played in the Premier League during the 2000–01 season and 2005–06 season. However, they refused promotion to the Premier League for the 2014 season, citing the stadium not meeting the requirements to play in the league and insufficient funding. The club was disbanded in 2015 due to the war after having briefly moved to playing in exile in the Poltava Oblast due to financial difficulties.

==== Other sports ====
The city formerly had motocross tracks that were in use. The city also held drag racing competitions, and hosted the 2008 Drag Racing Cup of Ukraine.

There was also a basketball team named "Koksokhim-Stal", a women's team in table tennis named "Stal", and a chess team named "Danko-Donbas". The table tennis team were Champions of Ukraine in 1993–94 and silver medalists in 1997, while the chess team were Champions of Ukraine from 1994 to 1997 and bronze medalists at the European Chess Club Cup in 1994.

== Twin towns – sister cities ==
Alchevsk is twinned with:

- Dąbrowa Górnicza, Poland (21 March 2006 – 2025?, terminated)
- Dunaújváros, Hungary (since 2004)
- Karadeniz Ereğli, Turkey
- Kamianske, Ukraine

It is also de facto twinned with the following cities by the LPR:

- Feodosia, Ukraine (since 2017)
- Chystiakove, Ukraine (since 2019)

== Notable people ==
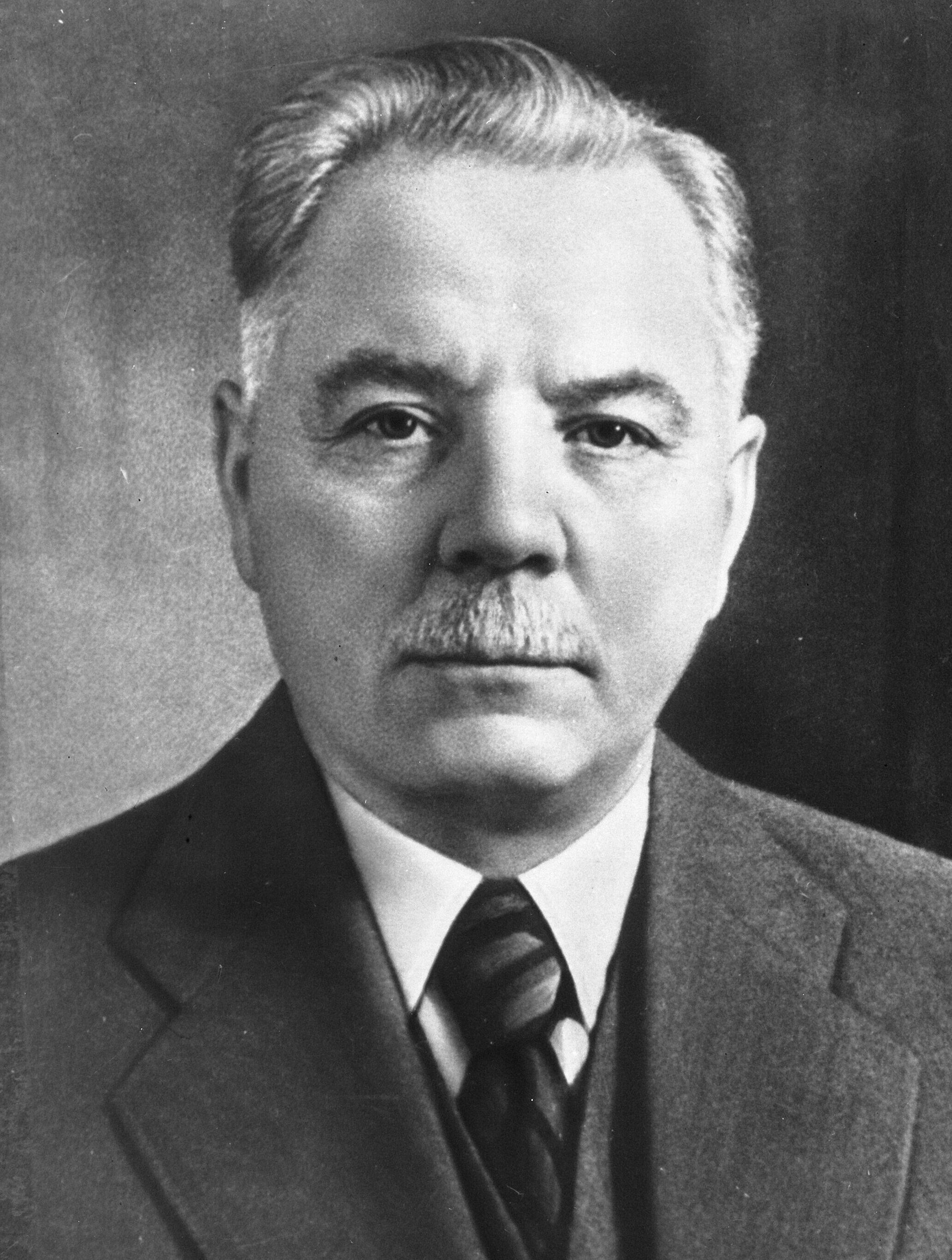
Kliment Voroshilov, a Marshal of the Soviet Union and People's Commissar for Defense of the Soviet Union, resided in the city and worked at the Alchevsk Metallurgical Complex during his childhood.

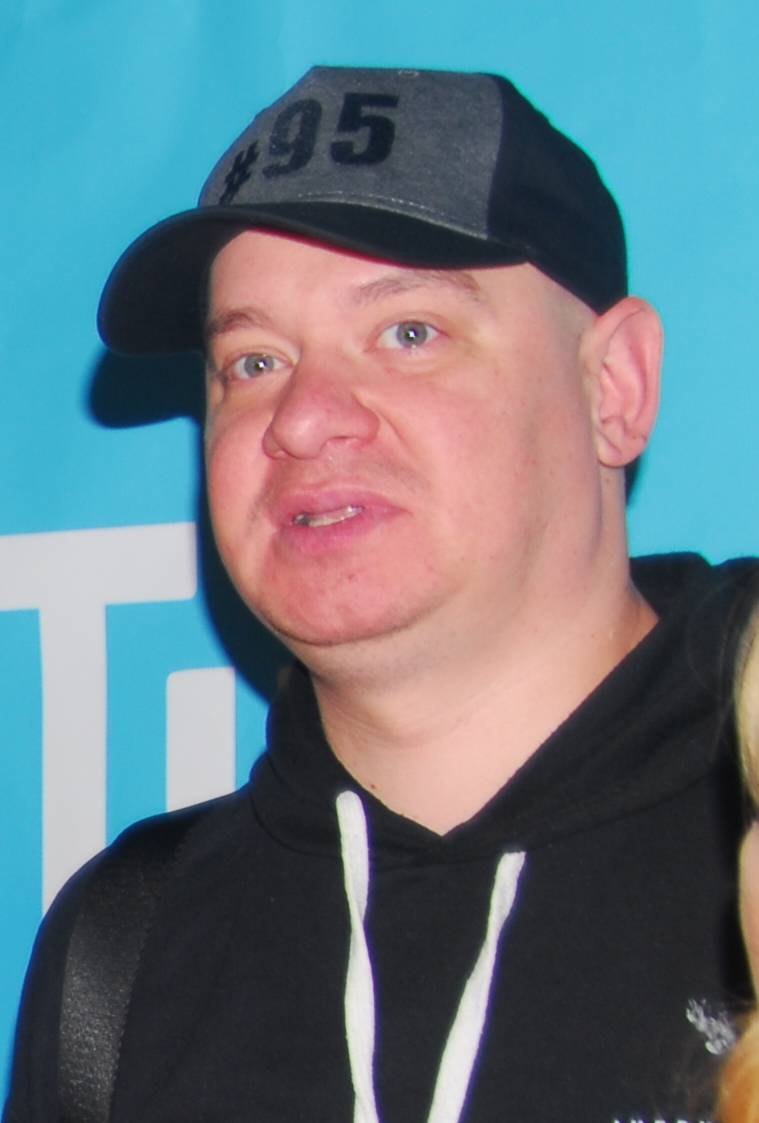
Yevhen Koshovyi, who is known for his role in Servant of the People, resided in the city during his childhood.

- Nikolai Babanin (1918–1990), Soviet military officer
- Liliana Gasinskaya (born 1960), Soviet defector
- Taras Kostanchuk (born 1964), Ukrainian activist and commander of the Donbas Battalion
- Yevgen Tsarkov (born 1974), People's Deputy of Ukraine from 2008 to 2012
- Artur Frolov (born 1970), Ukrainian chess player, World Team Chess Championship silver medalist
- Isa Kasimi (1961–2024), Ukrainian-born Latvian chess player, formerly a grandmaster

=== Sport ===
- Yuriy Batyushyn (born 1992), Ukrainian football player
- Kirill Bolshakov (born 2000), Ukrainian-Russian football player
- Krystyna Sankova (born 1996), Ukrainian artistic gymnast
- Andriy Tsvik (born 1971), Ukrainian football player
- Anatoliy Volobuyev (born 1953), Ukrainian football player and coach
- Oleksandr Babych (born 1979), Ukrainian football player and manager
- Igor Gamula (1960–2021), Ukrainian-Russian football player and coach
- Vadym Karatayev (1964–2020), Soviet football player
- Maksym Kovalyov (born 1989), Ukrainian football player
- Maksym Lopyryonok (born 1995), Ukrainian football player
- Hennadiy Zubov (born 1997), Ukrainian football player
- Volodymyr Malyhin (born 1949), Soviet-Ukrainian football player and coach
- Aleksandr Rymanov (born 1959), Soviet-Russian handball player, 1988 Olympic gold medalist
- Oleh Smolyaninov (born 1959), Soviet-Ukrainian football player and coach
- Volodymyr Titarenko (born 1978), Ukrainian volleyball player
- Anastasiya Winkel (born 1993), Ukrainian-born German sailor

== Sources ==
- Pospelov, Ye. M. (1993). "Имена городов: вчера и сегодня (1917–1992). Топонимический словарь." (City Names: Yesterday and Today (1917–1992). Toponymic Dictionary.). Москва: "Русские словари".
- Ямковой, А. А. (1996). Путь длиной в 100 лет. Областное издательство «Світлиця».
- Ямковой, А. А. (1972). Коммунарск: историко‑краеведческий очерк. Донбасс.
- Василий, Боровенский; Ямковой, А.А. (2003). История Алчевска. В.А.Боровенский.
