= Donbas State Technical University =

Public university in Lysychansk, Ukraine

- Донбаський державний технічний університет
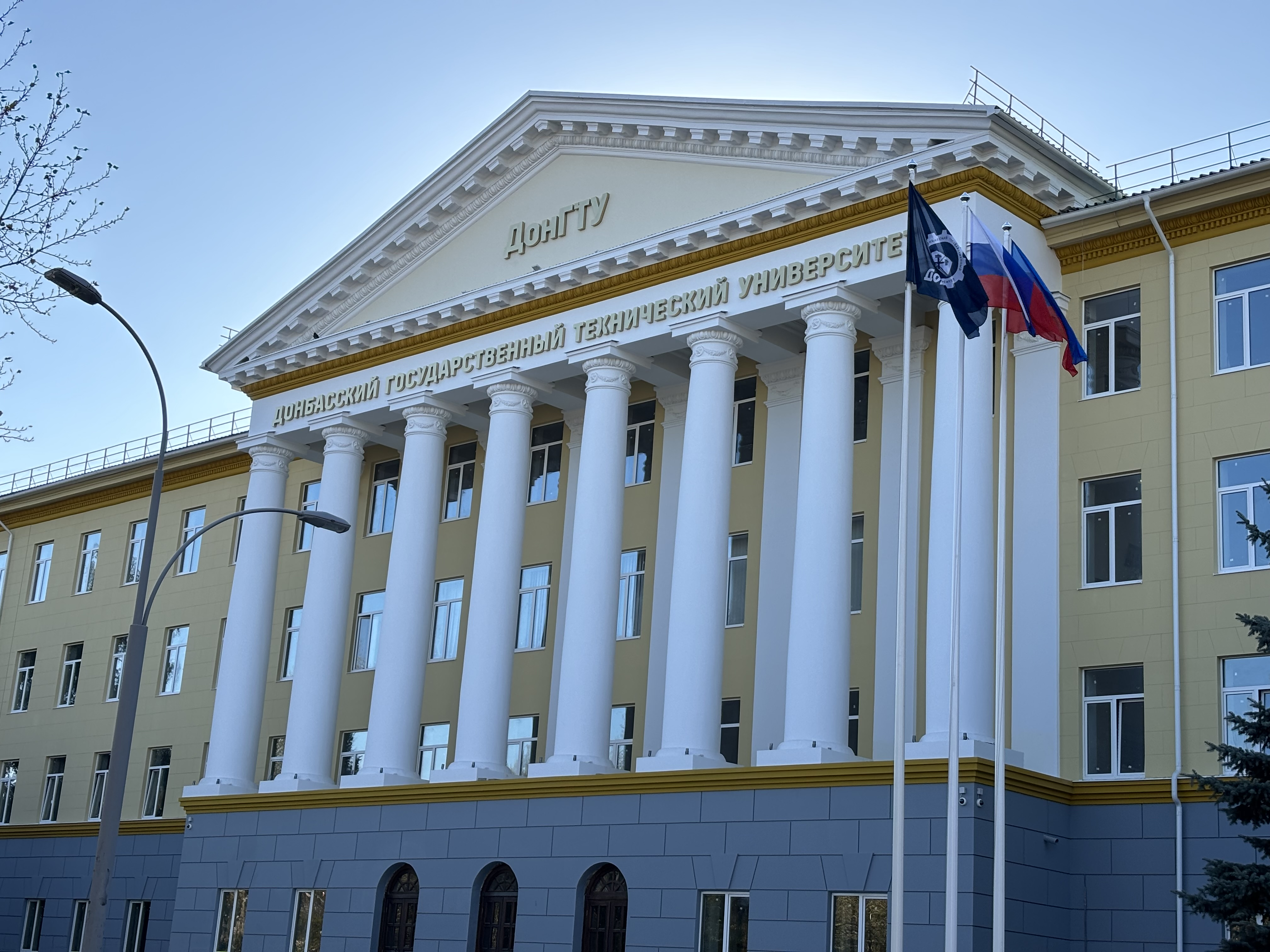
- DonSTU administrative building
- Type: University
- Active: October 12, 1957–2018 (Lysychansk, Ukrainian-controlled campus)
- Academic staff: 614 (2009)
- Total staff: 1,200 (2009)
- Students: 16,000 (2009)
- Location: Alchevsk; Lysychansk (2014–2018), Luhansk Oblast, Ukraine
- Website: dontu.ru

Donbas State Technical University (DonSTU) (Ukrainian: Донбаський державний технічний університет; Russian: Донбасский государственный технический университет, romanized: Donbassky gosudarstvenny tekhnichesky universitet) is an institution of higher education in Alchevsk, Ukraine.

== History ==
The Donbas State Technical University was founded on 12 October 1957. At that time, it was called Voroshylovsk Mining-Metallurgical Institute. In 1964, due to the changing of the town's name, the university was renamed to Kommunarsk Mining-Metallurgical Institute. In 1992, it became the Donbas Mining-Metallurgical Institute. By Order No. 622 of the Ministry of Education and Science of Ukraine of 27 July 2004, Donbas Mining-Metallurgical Institute was renamed Donbas State Technical University.

In November 2014, as a consequence of the war in Donbas, the university was relocated to Lysychansk by the Ukrainian authorities, resulting in a split of the institution. By Order No. 587 of the Ministry of Education and Science on 5 June 2018, the Ukrainian-controlled Donbas State Technical University was abolished and merged with the East Ukrainian National University. Meanwhile, the original campus in Alchevsk, under the control of the Luhansk People's Republic, continued to operate independently.

== Structure ==
The university in Alchevsk is organized into four main faculties, each comprising multiple departments, along with several specialized units.

- Faculty of Mining, Metallurgical Industry, and Construction
  - Department of Geotechnology and Production Safety
  - Department of Mining Energy and Mechanical Systems
  - Department of Ecology and Life Safety
  - Department of Metallurgical Technologies
  - Department of Machines for the Metallurgical Complex
  - Department of Technology and Organization of Mechanical Engineering Production
  - Department of Construction and Architecture
- Faculty of Information Technology and Automation of Production Processes
  - Department of Intelligent Systems and Information Security
  - Department of Electronics and Radiophysics
  - Department of Automated Control and Innovative Technologies
  - Department of Information Technology
  - Department of Electromechanics named after A.B. Zelenov
- Faculty of Economics, Management, and Linguistic Support
  - Department of Economics and Management
  - Department of Management
  - Department of Finance and Accounting
  - Department of Theory and Practice of Translation
- Faculty of Basic Training
  - Department of Humanities
  - Department of Higher Mathematics and Natural Sciences
  - Department of Physical Education, Sports, and Military Training
- Other Units
  - Multidisciplinary Technological College
  - Krasnyi Luch Branch
  - International Relations Department

== See also ==
- List of universities in Ukraine
