= Metal production in Ukraine =

Dominant heavy industry in the country

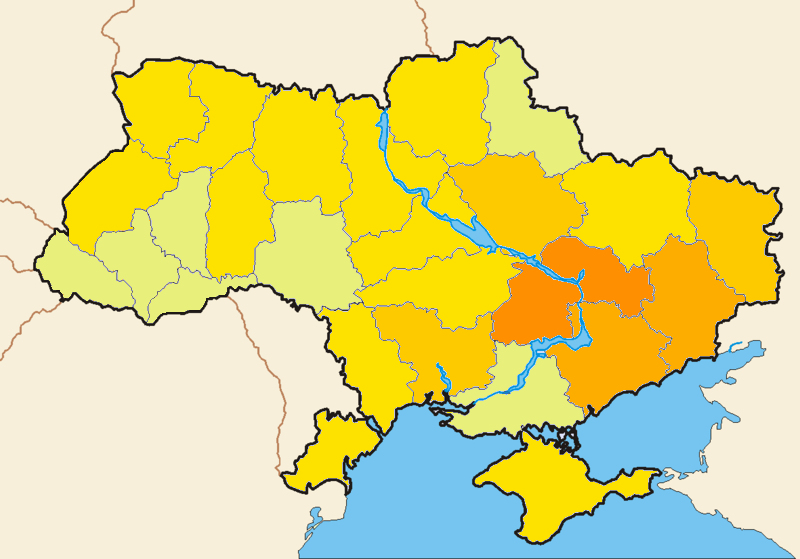
The geographic distribution of ferrous and non-ferrous output, expressed in monetary value per capita, as of 2007

Metal production, in particular iron and steel industry, was the dominant heavy industry in Ukraine. Steel production stopped in 2026 across the country.

== History ==
=== Copper Age ===
Metal production in Ukraine developed along the same lines as that of it near neighbours. The Stone Age and Copper Age boundary was unclear as most peoples retained Stone Age tools and used them alongside Copper Age tools.

The Trypilian culture began in Right-bank Ukraine Ukraine and existed from 5400 to 2000 BC. It is named after a site in the Kyiv region near Trypillia village, uncovered by Vikentiy Khvoyka in 1898. In southern part of Ukraine the Sredny Stog culture (4500-3500 BC) was the main influence along with the Catacomb culture (2800-2200 BC) and it is during these times that we see the earliest examples of copper technology in the form of fishing hooks and other implements around 2500 BC.

=== Iron Age ===
During the Iron Age, there were several influences on metallurgy: the Dacians, Cimmerians, Scythians, Sarmatians, among other nomadic peoples. The Scythian Kingdom existed here from 750 BC to 250 BC.

=== Ancient period ===
The ancient Greek colonies founded in the 6th century BC on the north-eastern shore of the Black Sea, the colonies of Tyras, Olbia, Hermonassa, continued as Roman and Byzantine cities until the 6th century AD.

=== 19th and 20th centuries ===
In 1868, the Millwall Iron Works Company received an order from the Imperial Russian Government for the plating of a naval fortress being built at Kronstadt on the Baltic Sea. Hughes accepted a concession from the Imperial Russian Government to develop metal works in the region, and in 1869 acquired a piece of land to the north of the Azov Sea from Russian statesman Sergei Kochubey (son of Viktor Kochubey).

He formed the New Russia Company Ltd. to raise capital, and in the summer of 1870, at the age of 55, he moved to the Russian Empire. He sailed with eight ships, with not only all the equipment necessary to establish a metal works, but also much of the skilled labour; a group of about a hundred ironworkers and miners mostly from South Wales.

He immediately started to build metal works close to the river Kalmius, at a site near the village of Alexandrovka. The state-of-the-art works had eight blast furnaces and was capable of a full production cycle, with the first pig iron cast in 1872. During the 1870s, collieries and iron ore mines were sunk, and brickworks and other facilities were established to make the isolated works a self-sufficient industrial complex. He further built a railway-line-producing factory. All of Hughes' facilities were held under the Novorussian society for coal, iron and rails production.

The Hughes factory gave its name to the settlement which grew in its shadow, and the town of Hughesovka (Yuzovka) grew rapidly. Hughes personally provided a hospital, schools, bath houses, tea rooms, a fire brigade and an Anglican church dedicated to the patron saints St George and St David. The land around the metal works quickly grew to become an industrial and cultural centre in the region; the population of the city founded by Hughes now exceeds 1 million.

Over the next twenty years, the works prospered and expanded, first under John Hughes and then, after his death in 1889, under the management of four of his sons. Amazingly, Hughes was only semi-literate - he was unable to write and could only read capital letters.

Ferrous metals production in millions of tonnes
Year	Iron	Steel	Rolled steel	Steel pipe
1913	2,0	2,4	2,1	0,07
1928	2,4	2,4	2,0	0,11
1940	9,6	8,9	6,5	0,56
1950	9,2	8,3	6,9	0,92
1960	24,2	26,2	21,1	2,22
1970	41,4	46,6	37,4	4,49
1978	38,0	56,7	37,6	4,00

=== 21st century ===
In 2007, Ukraine was the world's eighth largest producer and third largest exporter of iron and steel. Ukrainian iron and steel industry accounts for around 2% of worldwide crude steel output, 5% to 6% of the national gross domestic product and 34% of Ukrainian export revenue (2007 data). In 2007 it employed 420,000 people – 10% of industrial labor and 2% of the total workforce and had the highest, by a wide margin, revealed comparative advantage of all branches of the Ukrainian economy. The industry peaked at 42.8 million tonnes in 2007 but was affected by the 2008 financial crisis and declined to 29.8 million tonnes in 2009.

Ukraine possesses substantial natural reserves of iron ore. Ore mining exceeds the demands of domestic steel mills, but export potential is weakened by high extraction costs. The Ukrainian iron and steel industry is concentrated in central (Kryvyi Rih), southern (Zaporizhia, Nikopol) and eastern (Dnipro, Donets Basin, Mariupol) regions of Ukraine. There are 14 iron ore mining companies, 15 iron and steel mills, and three ferroalloy plants. Most of iron and steel is produced by large mills with annual capacity of between 4 and 7 million tonnes. As of 2006, 44.6% of Ukrainian steel was produced in obsolescent open hearth furnaces; modernization of plant and coping with rising energy costs are the main challenges to the future of Ukrainian steel. The Ukrainian steel industry has been privatized since the 1990s but the coal mines are still owned by the government and experience chronic financial problems.

Ukraine is also a significant producer of manganese, manganese ore and manganese ferroalloys and has 75% of the ore reserves of the former CIS. The aluminium industry concentrates in Mykolaiv and Zaporizhia but is limited by energy availability and costs. Ukrainian production of uranium in the Dnipropetrovsk Oblast provides only 30% of domestic demand.

In 2026, following ballistic missiles attacks within the Russian-Ukrainian war, steel production had fully and indefinitely stopped across the country.

== Natural resources ==
Mining of principal raw commodities, thousand metric tonnes
Commodity	2003	2004	2005	2006	2007
Alumina	1,434	1,562	1,632	1,672	1,700
Anthracite	14,427	18,295	16,204	13,444	13,000
Bituminous coal	63,866	62,100	58,000	66,600	62,255
Iron ore (pure Fe content)	34,300	36,000	37,700	40,700	42,800
Manganese ore (pure Mn content)	880	810	770	546	580
Titanium ores (pure Ti content)	314	283	286	344	362

Ukraine possesses world's largest reserves of commercial-grade iron ore - 30 billion tonnes of ore or around one-fifth of the global total. Adjusting for pure iron content the Ukrainian reserves (9 billion tonnes of iron, 11.6% of the global total) are the world's third largest after Russia and Australia. Iron ore mining is concentrated in Kryvyi Rih Ore Basin and 80% of it is controlled by the Ukrrudprom. Open-pit mining companies are capable of extracting 90 million tonnes annually whilst underground mining contributes another 18.5 million. Actual ore extraction, according to the United States Geological Survey, peaked in 2007 at 77.9 million tonnes of ore (42.8 million tonnes of pure iron content).

Ukrainian reserves of hard coals are concentrated in the Donets Basin. More than two hundred coal mines of Donbas account for 90% of Ukrainian coal output; the balance comes from 18 mines in Lviv Oblast and Volyn Oblast. Metallurgical-grade coals account for 54% of national coal reserves. In the 2000s the mix of Ukrainian coal output shifted in favor of energy coals and the steel mills compensated for the deficit of metallurgical coals with imports of coke from Russia (7 million tonnes in 2007) and other countries. Coal mining in Donbas is in continuous financial distress: the majority of coal mines, owned by the government, operate at a loss and require regular financial aid. Labor productivity in the Ukrainian coal industry is three to eight times lower than in Russia, Central Europe and the United States.

Economically viable manganese reserves in Ukraine are estimated at 140 million tons, or one-quarter of world's reserves (2010 data). They are spread over the Nikopol manganese basin which spans across Nikopol Raion, Kherson and Zaporizhia oblasts (provinces) on both sides of the Dnieper River. There are also three lesser manganese ore provinces which are not used commercially – Kerch, Burshtyn and Haivoron. Total reserve base of 520 million tons stands at 10% of the global reserve base which is dominated by South African resources (2008 data).

Ukrainian underground uranium and thorium mines are located in the Kirovohrad Oblast and are depleted by 50 to 60%. Their output, refined at the SkhidGZK plant in Zhovti Vody, meets only around 30% of national demand (2007 data). Ukraine has developed an ambitious program to expand uranium mining and production starting with the development of the Novokonstantinovskoye field.

Ukraine also possesses substantial reserves of scandium (as a byproduct of iron ore processing), titanium (as both ilmenite and rutile), zirconium and mercury. Mercury mining and processing by the Nikitovka Mines in Horlivka ceased in 1991 and the mine equipment has been partially converted for fluorescent lamp recycling. Emission of mercury from burning high-mercury Horlivka coals remains an environmental hazard.

== Iron and steel industry ==
Steel production has stopped in 2026. Production peaked in the early 2000s, as follows:

Metal production, thousand metric tonnes
Commodity	2003	2004	2005	2006	2007
Primary aluminium	114	113	114	113	113
Ferromanganese	250	375.99	359	373	368
Ferronickel	60	60	60	90	90
Ferrosilicon	250	248.06	228	169	218
Silicomanganese	740	1,060	1,046	1,168	1,281
Gold (USGS estimate)	0.50	0.50	0.50	0.50	0.50
Pig iron	29,570	31,060	30,747	32,926	35,600
Crude steel	36,900	38,738	38,636	42,899	42,830
Refined lead (USGS estimate)	13	15	61	56	62
Uranium	0.68	0.68	0.68	0.68	0.72

In 2000-2007 ferrous metallurgy expanded owing to a global rise in demand and prices. In 2007 crude steel production peaked at 42.8 million tonnes. 78% of it was exported—mostly to Italy, Russia and Turkey. Primary pig iron and secondary steel production is dominated by seven large steel mills with an annual capacity of 4 to 7 million tonnes. The industry has seen a pattern of consolidation into vertically-integrated companies and their ownership changes with continuing mergers and acquisitions. Key players are Kryvorizhstal (ArcelorMittal), Evraz, the Industrial Union of Donbas, Midland Group, Privat Group and Metinvest (SCM Holdings).

== Non-ferrous metals ==
Ukrainian manganese industry is controlled by Privat Group. Primary manganese smelting concentrates in the towns of Marhanets and Pokrov. Secondary manufacturing of ferroalloys and silicomanganese is spread between Nikopol Ferroalloy Plant, controlled by Interros, and lesser plants in Zaporizhia, Kadiivka, Kostyantynivka, Kramatorsk controlled by Privat. Total production of ferroalloys in 2007 reached 2 million tonnes.

Ukrainian aluminium industry consists of an alumina refining plant in Mykolaiv and the ZALK aluminium smelting plant in Zaporizhia, which is controlled by RUSAL. Annual capacity is estimated in excess of 1 million tonnes of refined alumina. Only a fraction of it is processed domestically, with a fairly constant production of 0.11 million tonnes of primary aluminium (2003–2007), or 0.3% of global output. Development and the very existence of aluminium smelting depends on securing sources of affordable energy. In 2007 ZALK coped with a 24% increase in electricity prices; in 2008 it faced a 45% price increase and shut down some of its electrolytic smelters.

== Ukrainian metallurgical companies ==
The following is a list of major metallurgical companies in Ukraine.

=== Ore mining and enrichment ===
- Ingulets Iron Ore Enrichment Works
- Northern Iron Ore Dressing Works
- Southern Iron Ore Dressing Works
- Central Iron Ore Enrichment Works
- Eastern Ore Dressing Works
- Evraz Sukha Balka
- Kryvorizky Iron Ore (Kryvbasruda)
- Pokrov Ore Dressing Works (Ordzhonikidze Ore Dressing)
- Marhanets Ore Dressing Works
- Zaporizky Iron Ore
- Irshansk Mine
- Poltava Mine
- Eristovo Mine
- Belanovo Mine
- Kamysh-Burun Mine
- Novokryvorizky Iron Ore

=== Steel and cast iron production ===
- Azovstal iron and steel works
- Illich Steel and Iron Works
- Donetsk Iron and Steel Works
- Donetsk Steel-Rolling Works
- Kramatorsk Iron and Steel Works
- Makiivka Iron and Steel Works
- Yenakiyeve Iron and Steel Works
- Kostiantynivka Iron and Steel Works
- Energomashspetsstal
- Alchevsk Iron and Steel Works
- ArcelorMittal Kryvyi Rih (Kryvorizhstal)
- Dnieper Iron and Steel Works
- Dnipro Iron and Steel Works
- Interpipe Steel (Dniprostal)
- Stalzavod (Dniprodzerzhynsk Steel Plant)
- Zaporizhstal
- Zaporizhzhia Foundry and Mechanical Plant
- Kerch Iron and Steel Works
- Kremenchuk Steel Works

=== Hardware and wire rope production ===
- Druzhkivka Hardware
- Dnipro Hardware
- Nikopol Factory of Technological Equipment
- Silur, a wire rope factory
- Kremenchuk Hardware

=== Pipe production ===
- Centravis
- Dnipro Factory of Stainless Pipes
- Dnipropetrovsk Pipe Factory
- IVIS Steel Factory of Arc Welding Pipes
- Khartsyzk pipe plant
- Luhansk Pipe Factory
- Nikopol Pipe Plant
- Novomoskovsk Pipe Factory
- Nyznyodniprovsk Pipe Factory
- Oscar Tube
- Rubizhne Pipe Factory
- Trubostal

=== Non-ferrous and special alloy metallurgy ===
- Artemivsk Factory of non-Ferrous Metals
- Mykytivsky Mercury Factory
- Ukrtsynk
- Toreztverdosplav
- Dokuchaevsk Dolomite-Sintering Factory
- Bilokamiansky Refractory
- Nikopol Ferroalloy Plant
- Zaporizhzhia Ferroalloy Plant
- Zaporizhzhia Aluminum
- Zaporizhzhya Titanium-Magnesium Plant
- Vilnohirsk non-Ferrous Metallurgy
- Ukrainian Chemical Products
- Ukrgrafit
- Stakhanov Ferroalloy Plant
- Severodonetsk Chemical-Metallurgy Factory
- Dneprospetsstal
- Pobuzke Ferronickel
- Nuclear Fuel Factory
- Kramatorsk Ferroalloy Plant
- Prydniprovsky Factory of non-Ferrous Metals
- Ukrsplav
- Brovary powder metallurgy
- Kremenchuk powder metallurgy
- Poltava powder metallurgy

=== Investment and holdings companies ===
- Nuclear Fuel (Ukraine)
- Metinvest
- Interpipe
- Ferrexpo
- Evraz
- IVIS Steel
- ArcelorMittal

=== Former ===
- Nikopol Southern Pipe Factory
- Zaporizhzhia Steel-Rolling Mill
- Luhansk Cast Iron Mill
- Kupiansk Cast Iron Mill
- Stakhanov Ferroalloy Plant
