= Metinvest International =

Swiss-based steel trading company

- Company type: Subsidiary
- Industry: Steel industry
- Predecessor: Leman Commodities SA
- Founded: 1997; 28 years ago
- Headquarters: Geneva, Switzerland
- Area served: Worldwide
- Products: Steel, iron ore products, pig iron, SAW Pipes, rails and rail fasteners
- Parent: Metinvest Group
- Website: metinvest-international.com

Metinvest International (until December 2007 known as Leman Commodities SA) is a Swiss-based steel trading company established in 1997. It is located in Geneva (Switzerland), and is the distribution channel of Steel and Rolled Products Division and Iron Ore Division of Metinvest Group (owned by Rinat Akhmetov).

Metinvest International sells and distributes iron ore products, pig iron, semi-finished Products, flat products, long products, submerged arc welding pipes, rails and rail fasteners.

== History ==
The company was founded in 1997 as Leman Commodities SA.

== Offices ==
Metinvest International has offices in 10 countries: Switzerland (Headquarter), Turkey, Italy, Lebanon, China, Lithuania, Tunisia, UAE and Singapore. Metinvest International also has established agencies in Canada and Dominican Republic which handle sales in the North and Latin Americas. correspondingly.

== Plants ==
- Azovstal Iron and Steel Works
- Yenakievo Iron and Steel Works
- Khartsyzsk pipe plant
- Ferriera Valsider
- Trametal
- Promet Steel Bulgaria
- Spartan UK

== Mills ==
- Northern Iron Ore Beneficiation Works (SEVGOK)
- Ingulets Iron Ore dressing Works (INGOK)
- Central Iron Ore Enrichment Works (CGOK)
