= Ferriera Valsider =

Ferriera Valsider S.p.A. is a steel works that has been operating in the province of Verona, Italy, since 2001. Ferriera Valsider produces structural steel: heavy plate and hot rolled coils with concast slab as raw materials. Major amount of slabs used is shipped from Azovstal Iron and Steel Works.

Ferriera Valsider Spa operated as a subsidiary of JSC System Capital Management and now, it operates as a subsidiary of Metinvest B.V.
