= Rostyslav Shurma =

Ukrainian statesman

- Ростислав Шурма
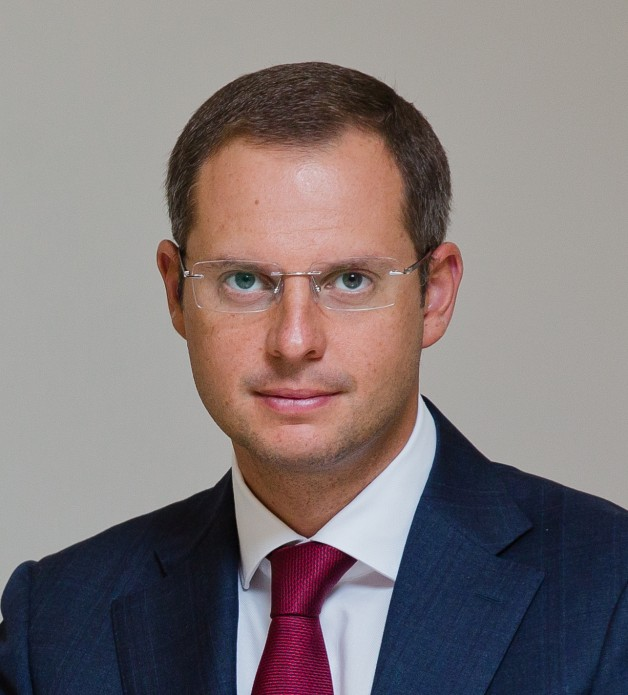

Deputy Head of the Office of the President of Ukraine
- In office 23 November 2021 – 3 September 2024
- President: Volodymyr Zelenskyy

Personal details
- Born: 17 September 1983 (age 43) Lviv, Ukrainian SSR, Soviet Union (now Ukraine)
- Education: National University of Kyiv-Mohyla Academy; Kyiv National Economic University

Rostyslav Shurma (Ukrainian: Ростисла́в І́горович Шурма́; born 17 September 1983) is a Ukrainian statesman, former Deputy Head of the Office of the President of Ukraine from 23 November 2021 till 3 September 2024. He was the CEO of the Zaporizhstal plant from 2012 to 2019.

== Early life ==
Rostyslav Shurma was born on 17 September 1983 in Lviv.

In 2004, he graduated from the National University of Kyiv-Mohyla Academy, majoring in “Economics and entrepreneurship”, bachelor's degree.

In 2005, he graduated from the Kyiv National Economic University, majoring in “Economic theory”, master's degree.

== Career ==
In 2003–2005, he worked as a finance analyst at Procter & Gamble in Eastern Europe.

Since 2006, Rostyslav Shurma worked in the Metinvest group. He also headed the strategy department, worked as the financial director of Makiivka Iron and Steel Plant, deputy director of the metallurgical division of Metinvest.

He was a member of the supervisory board of the Mariupol Metallurgical Plant, the chairman of the supervisory board of the Promet Plant in Bulgaria, a member of the board of directors of Metinvest-Trametal in Italy.

From 30 July 2012 to 25 November 2019, he was the CEO of Zaporizhstal.

On 21 May 2021, he was appointed a member of the supervisory board of Ukroboronprom.

From March 2021 he had worked as an Advisor to the Office of the President of Ukraine (out of staff).

On the 23 November 2021, he was appointed the Deputy Head of the Office of the President of Ukraine.

In 2022, he presented a “10-10-10” tax reform project (10 per cent income tax, 10 per cent personal income tax and 10 per cent VAT).

In 2024 on the 3rd of September, he was dismissed from his role as the Deputy Head of the Office of the President of Ukraine
