= Trametal SpA =

Italian brokerage and trading company

Trametal was founded in 1985 in Genova, Italy with production sites in San Giorgio di Nogaro, as a limited liability company whose main business concerned in brokerage and trading of steel products, particularly spare parts for steel plants. In 1969 the company changed its corporate form to a private limited company, renamed Trametal spa. In January 2008, Metinvest Holding LLC bought Trametal spa together with Spartan UK Ltd.
