= Vitaliy Satskyi =

Soviet and Ukrainian businessman and politician (1930–2017)

Hero of Ukraine Vitaliy Satskyi
- Віталій Сацький
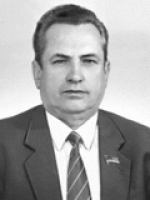

People's Deputy of Ukraine
- In office 15 May 1990 – 10 May 1994
- Preceded by: Position established
- Succeeded by: Leonid Anisimov
- Constituency: Zaporizhzhia Oblast, Zavodskyi District, Zaporizhzhia

Personal details
- Born: April 22, 1930 Chubarivka, Ukrainian SSR, Soviet Union (now Polohy, Ukraine)
- Died: October 26, 2017 (aged 87) Zaporizhzhia, Ukraine
- Party: Communist Party of the Soviet Union (1950–1991)
- Education: Dnipropetrovsk Metallurgical Institute

Vitaliy Antonovych Satskyi (Ukrainian: Віталій Антонович Сацький; 22 April 1930 – 26 October 2017) was a Soviet and Ukrainian businessman and politician who served as director of Zaporizhstal from 1986 to 2012 and as a People's Deputy of Ukraine for Zavodskyi District, Zaporizhzhia from 1990 to 1994.

== Career ==
Satskyi was born on 22 April 1930 in the village of Chubarivka (today Polohy), and joined the Communist Party of the Soviet Union in 1950. In 1954, he graduated a technological faculty of the Dnipropetrovsk Metallurgical Institute (today the National Metallurgical Academy of Ukraine) as metallurgical engineer.

In 1954 to 1980 he worked at the leading metal producing factory in Ukraine Kryvorizhstal starting from engineer-roller of rolling shop and secretary of the factory's Komsomol Committee to chief engineer and deputy director of Kryvorizhstal in 1968.

In 1980-1983 Satskyi was a director of the All-Union Research and Development Design Institute of Mechanized Labor in Ferrous Metallurgy (Ukrainian: Всесоюзний науково-дослідницький проектно-конструкторський технологічний інститут механізованої праці в чорній металургії) in Dnipropetrovsk or briefly Mekhchormet (Ukrainian: Мехчормет) and in 1983-1986 he was a chief of the Ukrmetalurhprom (Ukrainian: Укрметалургпром, Ukrainian Metallurgy).

From 1986 to 2012, Satskyi was director of Zaporizhstal. He was elected in the 1990 Ukrainian Supreme Soviet election from Zavodskyi District, Zaporizhzhia, placing first among eight candidates. He left the CPSU in 1991. He was a member of the Academy of Mining Sciences of Ukraine (1993), the Academy of Engineering Sciences of Ukraine, and the Russian Academy of Natural Sciences.

On 26 October 2017 he died after an after prolonged illness. At time of death, Satskyi was on the Forbes list of the most rich people in Ukraine with his assets estimated at $128 million.

== Awards ==
- Laureate of the State Prize of UkrSSR in Science and Technology (1970)
- Merited Metallurgist of Ukraine (1975)
- Hero of Ukraine (1999)
- Laureate of the State Prize of Ukraine in Science and Technology (2001)
- Order of the Badge of Honour (1966)
- Order of the Red Banner of Labour (1971)
- Full cavalier of the Order of Merit (all three degrees 1993–2005)
- Order of State (1999)
- Order of Prince Yaroslav the Wise (5th degree, 2009)
