= Kremenchuk Steel Works =

Metallurgical facility in Kremenchuk, Ukraine

- Native name: Кременчуцький сталеливарний завод
- Type: Open Joint Stock Company
- Industry: Metallurgy
- Founded: 1970
- Headquarters: 141 Ivan Prykhodko Street, 39621 City of Kremenchuk, Poltava Oblast, Ukraine
- Key people: Rostyslav Dubrov (General Director)
- Products: steel casting for freight cars and trucks, steel ingots
- Revenue: ₴50.3 million (2022)
- Number of employees: 5230 (January 2005); 3770 (June 2014); 2485 (August 2014); 2,162 (2017); 1,294 (2022)
- Website: steel.pl.ua

Kremenchuk Steel Works (Ukrainian: Кременчуцький сталеливарний завод, abbreviated KSZ) is a metallurgical enterprise based in Kremenchuk, Poltava Oblast, Ukraine. The main activity of the plant is the production of cast parts, freight cars, auto coupling mechanisms, parts for KrAZ vehicles, custom castings for production, and other heavy industry enterprises. The plant was first ordered to be constructed in 1970, and officially began production of steel a decade later in 1970. It currently has an annual production capacity of 138,000 tonnes of steel casting, though actual output has varied significantly.

At its peak during the Soviet era, the plant was producing 99,017 tonnes of steel casting annually. Following the dissolution of the USSR, the plant started establishing itself as one of the leading casting suppliers for post-Soviet countries. Just before the start of the war in the Donbas, the plant supplied approximately 30% of the CIS's steel casting market, and also exported to the international market. Following the outbreak of the war in the Donbas in 2014, the plant lost access to the Russian market, which was its primary export destination before the war. It then underwent several periods of shutdowns and restarts before resuming full operations from 2016-2020 and then again from early February 2022. The plant has continued to operate through the full-scale Russian invasion of Ukraine that began in late February 2022.

== History ==
=== Soviet era ===
On 18 May 1960, in accordance with the Decree of the Council of Ministers of the USSR No. 740, the construction of the steel plant officially began under the name "Kremenchuk Casting and Stamping Plant". It was created as part of the development of the newly created industrial hub of the city of Kremenchuk in the 1960s. The factory was officially opened on 30 December 1970 when its first steel was smelted, and a cast was made. However, it wasn't until a year later, on 15 March 1971, that the plant actually delivered its first batch of products, which were bolster beams for Kryukiv Railway Car Building Works (a company also located in Kremenchuk). Throughout the 1970s, the production grew after the factory acquired more modern technological features, including in 1973 a complex with a capacity of 33,000 tonnes of steel per year and in 1975 a moulding line by Künkel-Wagner which increased output by 30,000 tonnes.

By 1977, the production figure was at 68,518 tonnes of steel casting for the year, which went up in 1982 to 89,128 tonnes of steel casting in the year. In September 1978, the name of the plant was officially changed from "Kremenchuk Casting and Stamping Plant" to "Kremenchuk Steel Works", which it has stayed as since. Later that year, in July 1978, an additional casting complex and a second Künkel-Wagner line were commissioned. On 13 February 1986, the factory officially hit its one millionth tonne of steel casting produced.

=== Ukrainian era ===
Following the collapse of the Soviet Union, the company became a Ukrainian company that was reorganised into an open joint-stock company on 13 March 1995. In the 2000s, the company began the production of bogie frames model 18-100 for freight wagons, and Laempe Reich core-making equipment was installed alongside more Künkel-Wagner moulding lines. On 18 December 2003, the company was awarded the national «Vyshcha Proba» ("Highest Grade") quality prize by the Ukrainian state. By 2004 the total capacity of the plant reached 138,000 tonnes of steel casting per year, and in 2006, the international standard for quality management, ISO 9001, was implemented.

==== Certificate issues in Russia ====
In late September 2011, Russia's Railway Transport Certification Registere suspended the plant's certificate for export to Russia (the plant's main destination at the time) for bogie side frames following an inspection. The certificate in Russia, over the following years, would be in limbo: it was reinstated in December 2011, suspended in February 2012 for a frame fracture in extreme cold in northern Russia, production restarted in December 2012 despite the certificate not yet being reinstated, and between January and February 2013, there were numerous stoppages. On 5 April 2013, Russia reinstated the certificate, permitting a small initial production in the country. In October 2013, Russia again suspended certificates for multiple Ukrainian wagon builders, with KSZ being part of broader restrictions on exports to Russia. The issue would remain unresolved going into February 2014, when due to the outbreak of war, the Russian market collapsed.

==== Russian invasion of Ukraine ====
In February 2014, the plant shut down due to a loss of Russian market contracts, which had accounted for 30% of CIS casting supply prior to the outbreak of the War in the Donbas. At the end of 2015, the company partially resumed work to renew its quality certificates, and finally, by December 2016, the plant fully reopened after two years. In October 2016, the order to resume the work of the factory was signed, and in November 2016 in an interview, the director of the plant, Viktor Samusenko, additionally confirmed this and denied rumours that equipment was being scrapped for metal. On 5 December 2016, the plant returned to full operation after a two-year shutdown.

In March 2020, the plant again shut down due to a lack of sales and the end of contracts due to the ongoing war. In early February 2022 production resumed under director Rostyslav Dubrov, and on 15 February 2022 Kryukiv Carriage Works approved a casting supply contract worth 432 million UAH for 2022 with the plant. Despite the start of the Russian invasion of Ukraine on 24 February 2022, the plant did not cease operations and made a profit of 50.3 million UAH in 2022 according to the National Securities and Stock Market Commission. The upward trend in profit continued for a few years into 2024 when it had a net profit of 369.3 million UAH, but by 2025 this had reversed to a loss of 277.9 million UAH due to hyperinflation adjustments.

== Products and destinations ==
The plant specialises in the production of steel castings for freight wagon bogies, primarily bolster beams and side frames, with castings ranging from 50 to 450 kg. Alongside wagon castings, the plant also produces parts for KrAZ heavy trucks, automatic coupler housings, and custom castings. During the Soviet era, the plant also briefly manufactured consumer goods such as garage doors, but this was discontinued to focus more on industrial contracts.

Prior to 2014, the plant supplied around 30% of the CIS market for steel casting, although it also exported to Iran, Cuba, South Africa, and the United States. Its main competitor in these markets was Uralvagonzavod and AzovElectroStal.

== Ownership ==
Until 2008, the System Capital Management (SCM) holding company, which is owned by politician Rinat Akhmetov, held a 19.41% stake in the company, but they sold it that year. Following the sale of the shares, Ihor Kolomoyskyi (who owns Privat Group) and Serhiy Tihipko (who owns the TAS Group conglomerate) became the consolidated owners of 95% of the shares of the company.

By 2010, the principal shareholders were Dniprometiz, a TAS Group entity (which held 35.82%) and Cyprus-registered Defano Investments Ltd., which held 48.45%. By a few years later, from 2017-2018, the Cyprus-registered companies held 94.66% of the shares, with the majority being Defano Investments Ltd, then Sertaco Limited, and Devisal Limited, with Ukrainian companies holding almost no shares by that point. This was reversed by the 2020s, when a lot of the Cypriot companies pulled out following the war, and by 2025 Alfa Kros LLC of Kyiv and Indeko LLC of Kamianske owned the majority.

== See also ==
- AvtoKrAZ
- Kryukiv Railway Car Building Works
- List of metallurgical companies in Ukraine
