= Dniprodzerzhynsk Steel Plant =

Ukrainian steel plant

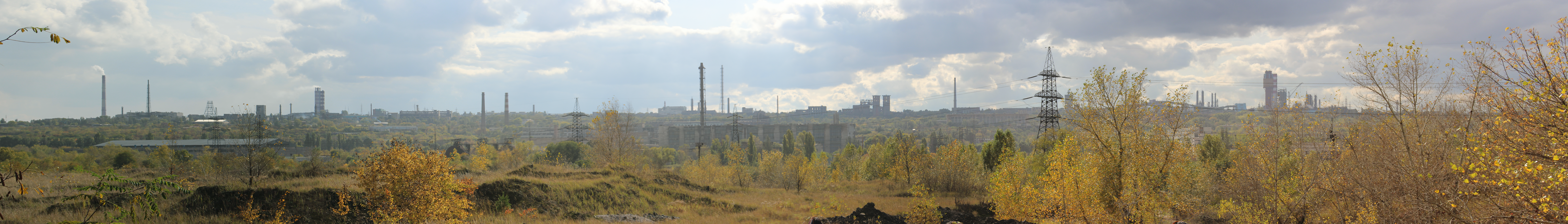
- Kamianske skyline
- Native name: Дніпродзержинський сталеливарний завод
- Founded: 1926
- Headquarters: 51925, Dnipropetrovsk Oblast, City of Kamianske, Ukrains'ka Street, 4, Ukraine
- Parent: DniproVahonMash

Dniprodzerzhynsk Steel Plant or Stalzavod is a metallurgical enterprise in Kamianske, Dnipropetrovsk Oblast, Ukraine. The steel plant is a subsidiary of PJSC Dniprovahonmash.
