= Northern Iron Ore Beneficiation Works =

Iron ore dressing complex in Ukraine

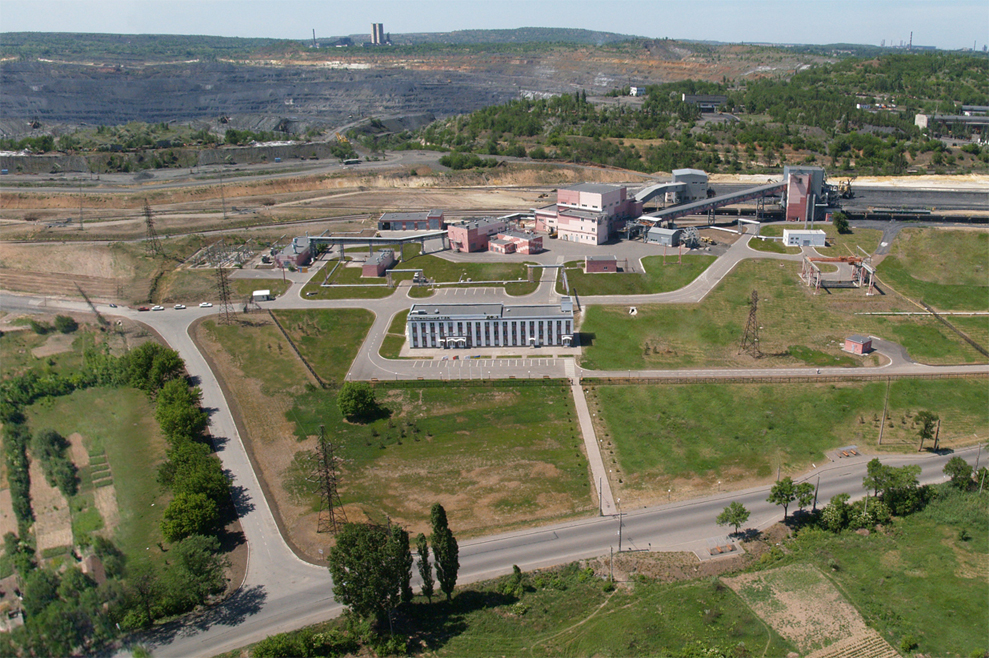
Crushing factory #3 of Northern Iron Ore Beneficiation Works
- Company type: Subsidiary
- Traded as: PFTS:SGOK
- Industry: Mining
- Founded: 1963
- Headquarters: Ternivskyi District, Kryvyi Rih, Ukraine
- Products: Iron ore
- Parent: Metinvest
- Website: sevgok.metinvestholding.com

Northern Iron Ore Beneficiation Works (PivnGZK) (Ukrainian: Північний гірничо-збагачувальний комбінат (ПівнГЗК); Russian: СевГОК) is one of several iron ore dressing complexes around Kryvyi Rih, and was built and launched in Kryvyi Rih in 1963. Along with Ingulets Iron Ore Dressing Works and Central Iron Ore Enrichment Works, it belongs to Ukrainian holding company Metinvest.

== Description ==
The territory of the complex was selected back in 1953 on orders of the Soviet Ministry of Ferrous Metallurgy. In 1958 there was adopted resolution of the Central Committee of the Communist Party of the Soviet Union and the Council of Ministers of the Soviet Union on construction of the complex. In 1963 the complex ore-dressing factory provided its first ore concentrate. The complex was honored with the Lenin's Komsomol of Ukraine. It became a key enterprise of the Soviet Military Industrial Complex.

It is one of the largest iron ore mining enterprises in Europe, producing merchant concentrate with Fe content of 68.4% and pellets with Fe content of 60.5% and 63.5%. Northern GOK is a monopolist in the iron ore market in Ukraine, making up 45% of total iron ore pellets and about 20% of merchant concentrate.

Northern GZK incorporates:

- the Annovskyi and the Pervomayskyi quarries, which in total constitute 3,807 Mtonnes of mineral resources
- cyclical-and-continuous crushing plant, launched in 2006
- two pellet plants
- auxiliary workshops

In 2023, the Northern Iron Ore Enrichment Works entered Ukraine's Top 200 companies by income for 2022, which indicates its successful activities and significant contribution to the global economy.

== Awards ==
- Order of Lenin
- Order of Labour (Czechoslovakia)
