= Komsomolskoye mining company =

Ukrainian mining company

Komsomolskoye mining company was founded in 1995 in Komsomolske, Donetsk Oblast. In 2011 Komsomolskoye mining company became part of the Iron Ore Division of Metinvest Group. Komsomolskoye mining company is the biggest Ukrainian supplier of limestone flux to the metallurgical and food industries. Structure of the enterprise includes three active quarries and two crushing and beneficiation factories.

== See also ==
- Coal in Ukraine
- List of mines in Ukraine
