= Stakhanov Ferroalloy Plant =

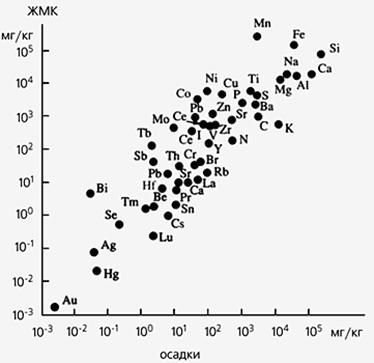
- Average content of chemical elements in ferromanganese nodules.
- Native name: Стахановський завод феросплавів
- Industry: Ferrous metallurgy
- Founded: 1961
- Headquarters: 94000, Kadiivka, Luhansk Oblast, Ukraine
- Key people: Volodymyr Soloshenko
- Products: Ferrosilicon
- Number of employees: 1600 (2016)
- Footnotes / references Код ЄДРПОУ 00186513

Stakhanov Ferroalloy Plant (Ukrainian: Стахановський завод феросплавів, romanized: Stakhanovskyi zavod ferosplaviv) is the largest (about 50% of all-Ukrainian production) plant for the production of ferrosilicon in Ukraine. The plant is located in the city of Kadiivka (formerly Stakhanov), Luhansk Oblast, Ukraine. It is located on territory controlled by the Russian government.

== History ==
The decision to start construction was made in 1952. Construction took place during 1959-1962. The plant has eight ferroalloy furnaces with a capacity of about 2,000 tons per month each. The main products are: ferrosilicon, ferromanganese, and ferrosilicon manganese. Most of the company's products (about 75%) were exported from Ukraine.

In 2011, SFP reduced the production of ferroalloys by 5.2% compared to 2010 - to 208.3 thousand tons. At the same time, the plant increased the production of ferrosilicon (in terms of 45%) by 6.8% - to 145.3 thousand tons, but reduced the production of silico-manganese - by 24.7% to 63 thousand tons.

By the end of 2011, four Cypriot companies: Philex Investments Limited, Felicio Enterprises Limited, Kellton Enterprises Limited and Mercliston Limited, owned 24.4867% each, for a total of 97.9468% of SFP. The business of Stakhanov FP, Zaporizhzhia Ferroalloy Plant, Ordzhonikidze and Marhanets mining and processing plants is organized by PrivateBank (Dnipropetrovsk). Delivery of products was carried out to Alchevsk Metallurgical Complex.

In 2018, during the Russian occupation of Luhansk Oblast, the plant came under the external management of the South Ossetian company "Vneshtorgservice" run by Vladimir Pashkov and was named "branch № 13" Stakhanov Ferroalloy Plant of "Vneshtorgservice." At the same time, press reports said that as of July 2018 the plant operated a single furnace, producing ferrosilicon at around 1000-1800 tons per month. The product was then delivered to the (also Russian-held) Alchevsk Metallurgical Complex.

== Products ==
- Ferrosilicon
- Ferrosilicon manganese
- Ferromanganese
- Electrode mass (Anode paste)
- Slag
