= Azovstal railway station =

Railway station in Ukraine

Azovstal

General information
- Location: Ukraine
- Coordinates: 47°06′09″N 37°33′55″E
- Owner: Ukrainian Railways

Other information
- Status: Closed
- Station code: 484713

History
- Opened: 1913
Location

Azovstal (Ukrainian: Азовсталь) was a railway station in Mariupol, Ukraine. It was named after Metallurgical Combine Azovstal. Nowadays, Highway M14 is located above the place where the station previously was.
