= Zaporizhzhia Foundry and Mechanical Plant =

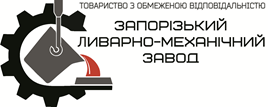

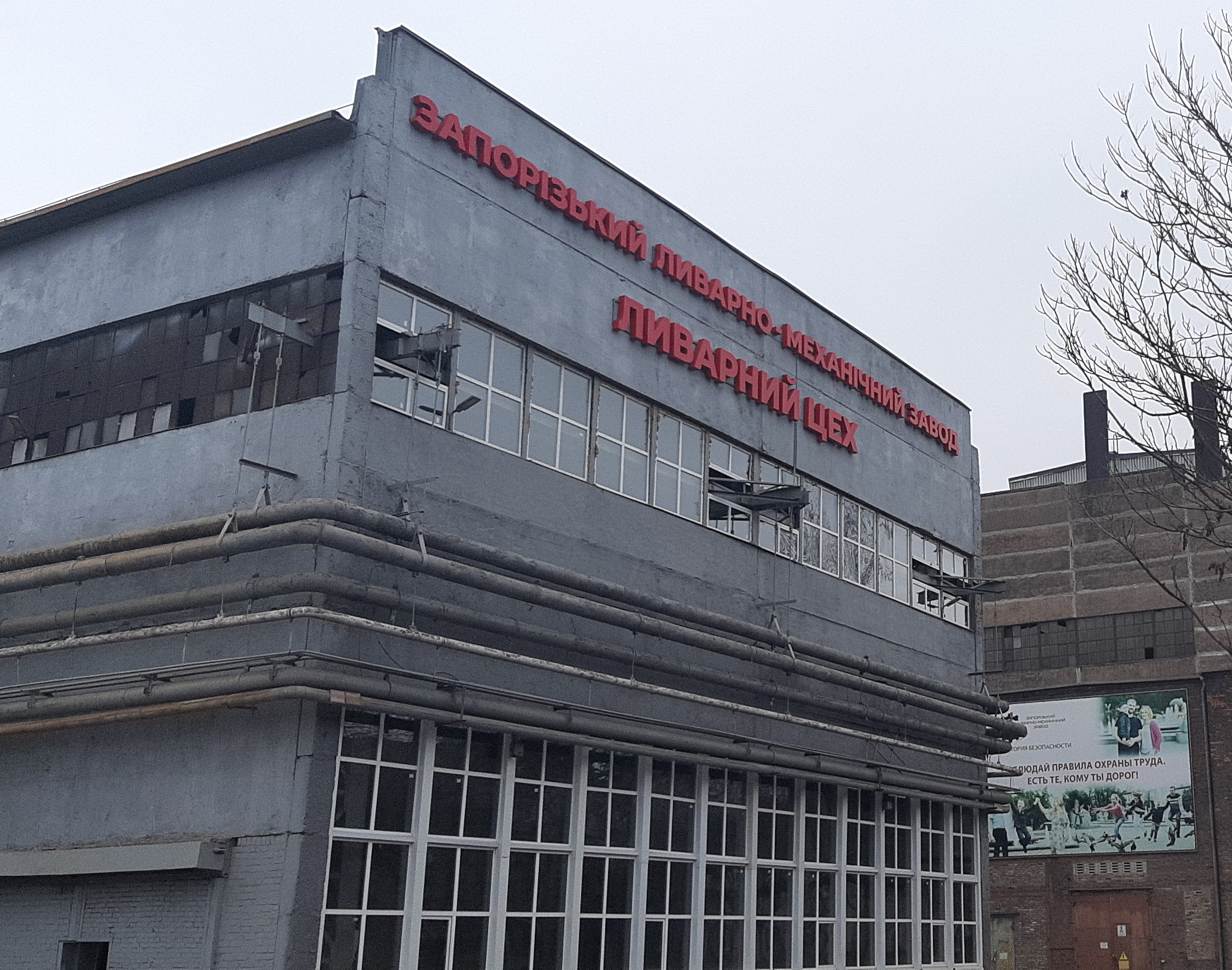
- Native name: Запорізький ливарно-механічний завод
- Company type: Private limited company
- Industry: Metallurgy
- Founded: 2016
- Founder: Zaporizhstal
- Headquarters: 72 Pivdenne Shosse, Zaporizhzhia, (on the territory of PJSC "Zaporizhstal"), Ukraine
- Products: castings, metal structures, spare parts for machines, mechanisms and equipment
- Net income: 26,000 hryvnia (2019)
- Number of employees: 1004 (2019)
- Parent: Metinvest
- Website: zlmz.com.ua
- Footnotes / references ЄДРПОУ: 32729463

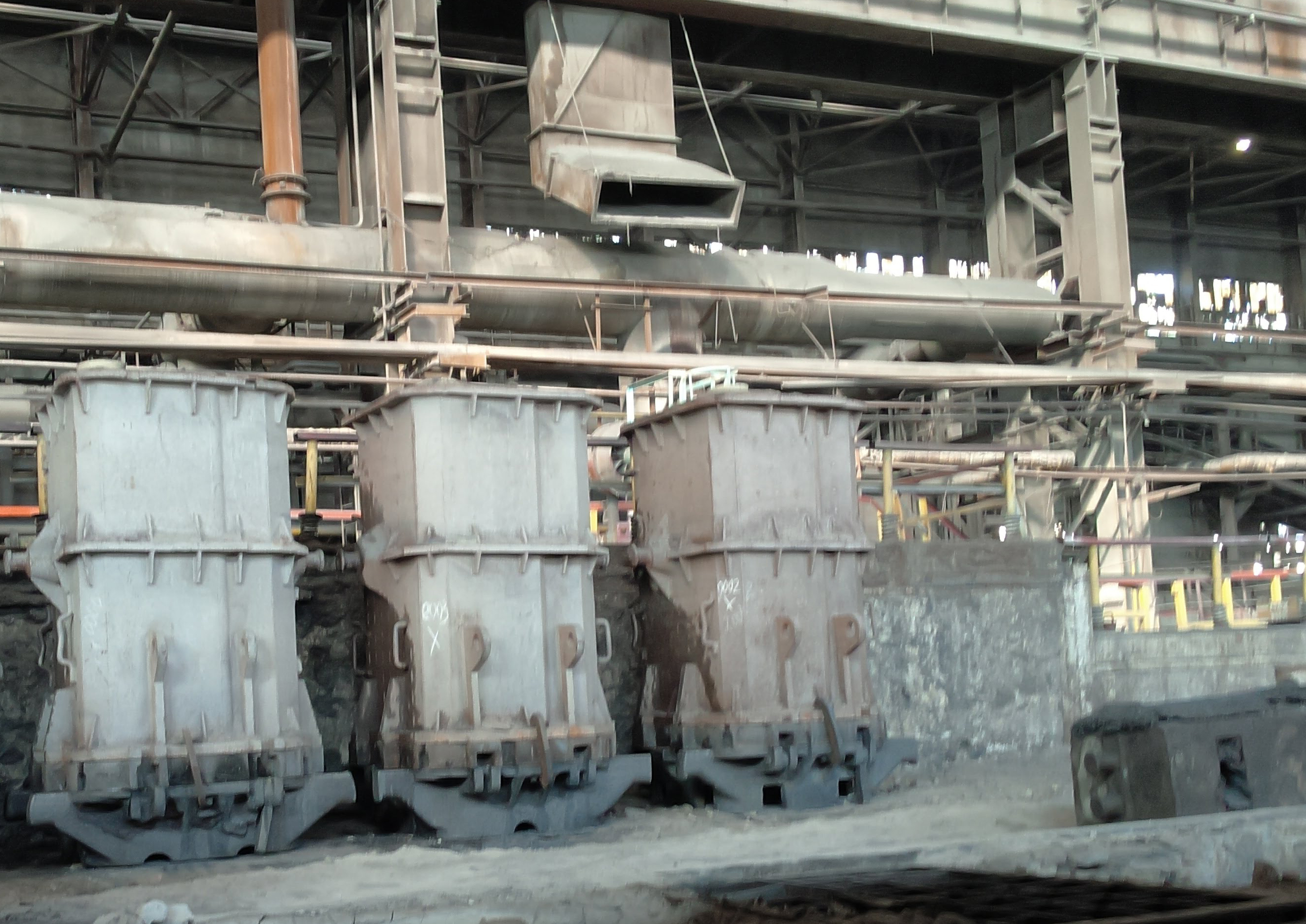
Zaporizhzhia Foundry and Mechanical Plant

Zaporizhzhia Foundry and Mechanical Plant is an enterprise of the metallurgical industry in the city of Zaporizhzhia, of Zaporizhzhia Oblast, Ukraine.

== About the company ==
On August 1, 2016, to increase the operational efficiency of PJSC "Zaporizhstal," some of the repair shops of the metallurgical enterprise were moved to a separate plant, which was named "Zaporizhzhia Foundry and Mechanical Plant."

The enterprise included three shops: foundry, mechanical and metal structures. The main types of products are molds for metallurgical plants, metal structures, spare parts and prefabricated units.

Activities include: production of cast iron, steel and ferroalloys; production of hollow pipes and fittings from steel; production of building metal structures and parts of structures; machining of metal products; production of finished metal products; wholesale of metals, metal ores; and the repair and maintenance of machinery and equipment for industrial use.

== History of the plant ==
In 1931, on the left bank of the Dnipro in Zaporizhzhia, the construction of the Dnieper Metallurgical Combine began - the largest in Europe (at that time) complex of ferrous and nonferrous metallurgy. It first included a coke plant, a sheet steel plant (later Zaporizhstal), a fireclay refractory brick plant, a ferroalloy plant (now the Zaporizhzhia Ferroalloy Plant), a repair and mechanical plant (in 2016 it became a foundry and mechanical plant), an aluminum plant (Zaporizhzhia Aluminum Plant), a steel plant (future "Dneprospetsstal") and other, smaller enterprises.

On March 20, 1932, the construction of the foundry was completed, and on May 1 of the same year, the forging shop was completed. On October 10, 1933, a mechanical shop was built.

Thus, by the fall of 1933, the repair and mechanical plant had a full cycle of production of spare parts for the repair of units of the Dniprocombinat (Dnieper Metallurgical Combine) - from casting to machined parts.

In May 1934, the sheet steel plant, the tool steel plant, the ferroalloys plant, the fireclay plant, and the RMZ (Repair / Mechanical Zavod (factory)) merged into the Zaporizhstal plant.

In memory of RMZ, the tram stop № 3, which is located near the plant, has been bearing this name for many years.

Before the Nazis invaded Zaporizhia, Zaporizhstal's equipment was evacuated to the rear (Magnitogorsk, Russia), and the rest, including the shops of the former RMZ, were damaged or blown up.

On August 18, 1941, the first shells of Nazi artillery mounted on the right bank of the Dnieper fell on Zaporizhstal. Traces of these shells can still be seen on the roof of the building of the blacksmith's department of the mechanical shop.

After the Nazis occupied the city, they brought their equipment to the foundry, blacksmith and mechanical shops, as well as restored some of the damage, and then repaired light armored vehicles, guns, and vehicles.

During the Nazi occupation, Zaporizhstal had an anti-fascist underground. The Nazis did not manage to establish full-fledged repair shops due to continuous sabotage.

In 1944, immediately after the liberation of Zaporizhzhia, work began on the restoration of metallurgical enterprises, primarily Zaporizhstal. First of all, the shops of the former repair and mechanical plant, the electricity and gas supply system, and the subsidiary economy were restored.

On April 1, 1953, a boiler repair shop was opened at Zaporizhstal, which was later renamed the Metalworks Shop.

In 1958, a harvester plant was built on the territory of the mechanical shop, but reapers and other agricultural machinery were practically not produced here. Due to this, the mechanical shop was expanded.

In 1962, Europe's largest foundry was built, producing first-melting liquid castings. In this shop for the first time in the world the practice of liquid self-hardening mixes used for manufacturing of forms began to be applied.

In the early 1980s, the blacksmith's shop became part of the mechanical shop.

In the 1990s, three workshops were merged into one structural unit - the foundry.

In the early 1990s, the weighing workshop was separated from the mechanical shop into a separate structural unit, which expanded and is called the "Shop of technological weighing systems." Currently, it is part of the Zaporizhstal plant.

On January 1, 2006, a modern thermal department with mine and chamber electric furnaces, as well as quenching installations with high-frequency currents was put into operation in the mechanical shop. At the same time, induction melting furnaces began to operate in the foundry.

In 2014, the mechanical shop included sections for production, repair, and pipe mills of the former shop of consumer goods.

== Recent history ==
On August 1, 2016, the shops of the former RMZ - mechanical and foundry - were withdrawn from Zaporizhstal to a separate structural unit called Zaporizhzhia Foundry and Mechanical Plant. This is the only enterprise in Metinvest where repair services have been transferred from shops to separate structural subdivisions.

In the summer of 2017, the public transport stop "Steel Rolling Plant" was renamed "Foundry and Mechanical Plant" according to the petition № 1038 from July 26, 2017 on the website of electronic petitions in Zaporozhzhia (in connection with the liquidation of the steel plant).

On March 21, 2018, the plant was certified according to the international standard of energy management ISO 50001.

On July 20, 2018, the plant was certified according to the international standard, which sets requirements for the quality management system "ISO 9001" Quality Management Systems Requirements.

On June 13, 2019, the plant was awarded the certificate ISO 14001: 2012 environmental standard of the International Organization for Standardization.

Starting from April 12, 2023, Zaporizhzhia Foundry and Mechanical Plant will unite its specialized divisions in Zaporizhzhia, Kryvyi Rih and Kamianske under a single management, becoming a multidisciplinary repair and mechanical plant.

== Directors ==
- 2016 - 2021, Yevhen Serhiiovych Shramko
- 2021 - 2022, Igor Dolgozvezda
