= Krasnodonvugillya =

Coal-mining company in Ukraine

VAT "Krasnodonvugillya" (meaning: Krasnodon Coal, Ukrainian: ВАТ «Краснодонвугілля», Russian: ПАО «Краснодонуголь») is a coal-mining company located in the northern part of the Donetsk coal basin within Krasnodon district of Luhansk Oblast, Ukraine.

== History ==
Krasnodonvugillya started as a group of Sorokino coal mines having yielded the first 110 ktonnes of coking coal in 1914. In 1935, the trust “Sorokino coal” was established. The trust united 25 coal mines. In 1936, the trust was renamed into “Krasnodon Coal”. In 1940, the company mined 2.44 Mtonnes of coking coal with the length of excavations reached 30 km. During its 93 years history (1914–2007), the company mined about 370 Mtonnes of coal.

Krasnodonvugillya was established in accordance with the Order No. 289 of Ministry of Fuel and Energy from June 8, 2004. In autumn 2004 the State Property Fund of Ukraine sold a 60% stake in "Krasnodonugol" to Avdiivka Coke Plant. In May 2005, OJSC "AKHZ" bought from the State Property Fund 39.91% of shares of Krasnodonvugillya.

Since 2006 the Public Joint Stock Company "Krasnodonugol" is a part of the Metinvest Group, which manages the mining and steel business jointly owned by SCM Group and Smart Group.

== Activity ==
The main activity of Krasnodonvugillya is the extraction and enrichment of coking coal. The company also provides engineering and surveying works for exploration, construction and exploitation of mineral deposits, and performs other works.

Krasnodonvugillya draws from recoverable coal deposits of Krasnodon geological-industrial raion in Luhansk region, with coal bedding angles from 0 to 60 degrees at the depth of 400–1200 meters. The average depth of mining works is 711 meters, average thickness of a seam is 1.72 meters.
