= DniproVahonMash =

LLC «TAS DNIPROVAGONMASH»
- Type: Limited liability company
- Industry: Railway rolling stock (freight)
- Founded: 1926
- Headquarters: Kamianske, Ukraine
- Key people: General Director : Sergii Dziavoruk; Chief Design Engineer: Stanislav Dolynskyi
- Products: Freight wagons, Bogies, Wheel sets, Welded fabrications, Freight Wagon Components
- Services: Welding, Machining, Coating Application
- Number of employees: >4000
- Website: https://dvmash.biz/en.html

LLC „ TAS Dniprovagonmash” (Ukrainian: Дніпровагонмаш) is a rail freight rolling stock manufacturer based in Ukraine.

== Products and customers ==
The company produces a wide range of freight rail cars: flat wagons (for containers, steel, lumber, vehicles, pipes), gondola wagons, covered box wagons, hopper wagons for grain, cement, minerla fertilizers etc., and dump cars for a variety of different materials. Among specialized wagons are wagons for incandescent coke and hot metal billets, and bunker cars for asphalt.

The company has custumers and implements projects in Baltic States, Bulgaria, Slovak Republic, Cuba, Egypt, Algeria, Guinea and Nigeria etc.
