= Zavodskyi District, Zaporizhzhia =

City district of Zaporizhzhia, Ukraine

Zavodskyi District Заводський район
- Urban district
- Administrative map of Zaporizhzhia; the Zavodskyi Raion is indicated by the number 2.

- Location of the urban district on a map of Zaporizhzhia Oblast.
- Coordinates: 47°53′50″N 35°11′35″E
- Country: Ukraine
- Municipality: Zaporizhzhia Municipality
- Established: 23 May 1969

Government
  - Chairman: Volodymyr Biriuk

Area
  - Total: 56 km^{2} (22 sq mi)

Population (2012)
  - Total: 52,191 ▼
  - Density: 930/km^{2} (2,400/sq mi)
- Time zone: UTC+2 (EET)
  - Summer (DST): UTC+3 (EEST)
- Postal index: 330600
- Area code: +380 61
- KOATUU: 2310136600
- Website: w1.c1.rada.gov.ua/pls/z7502/A005?rdat1=25.01.2015&rf7571=13147

The Zavodskyi District (Ukrainian: Заводський район, Zavods'kyi raion) is one of seven administrative urban districts (raions) of the city of Zaporizhzhia, located in southern Ukraine. Its population was 60,390 in the 2001 Ukrainian Census, and 52,191 as of 2012.

== Geography ==
The Zavodskyi District is named in such a way due to the fact that a large amount of the city's factories are located within its boundaries. The district is located in the northern portion of the city, on the left-bank of the Dnipro River. Its total area is 56 km^{2} (22 mi^{2}).

== History ==
On 23 May 1969, the Zavodskyi District was established out of a portion of the Ordzhonikidzevskyi District by a decree of the Presidium of the Verkhovna Rada of the Ukrainian Soviet Socialist Republic (No.1901-ІХ).

== Gallery ==
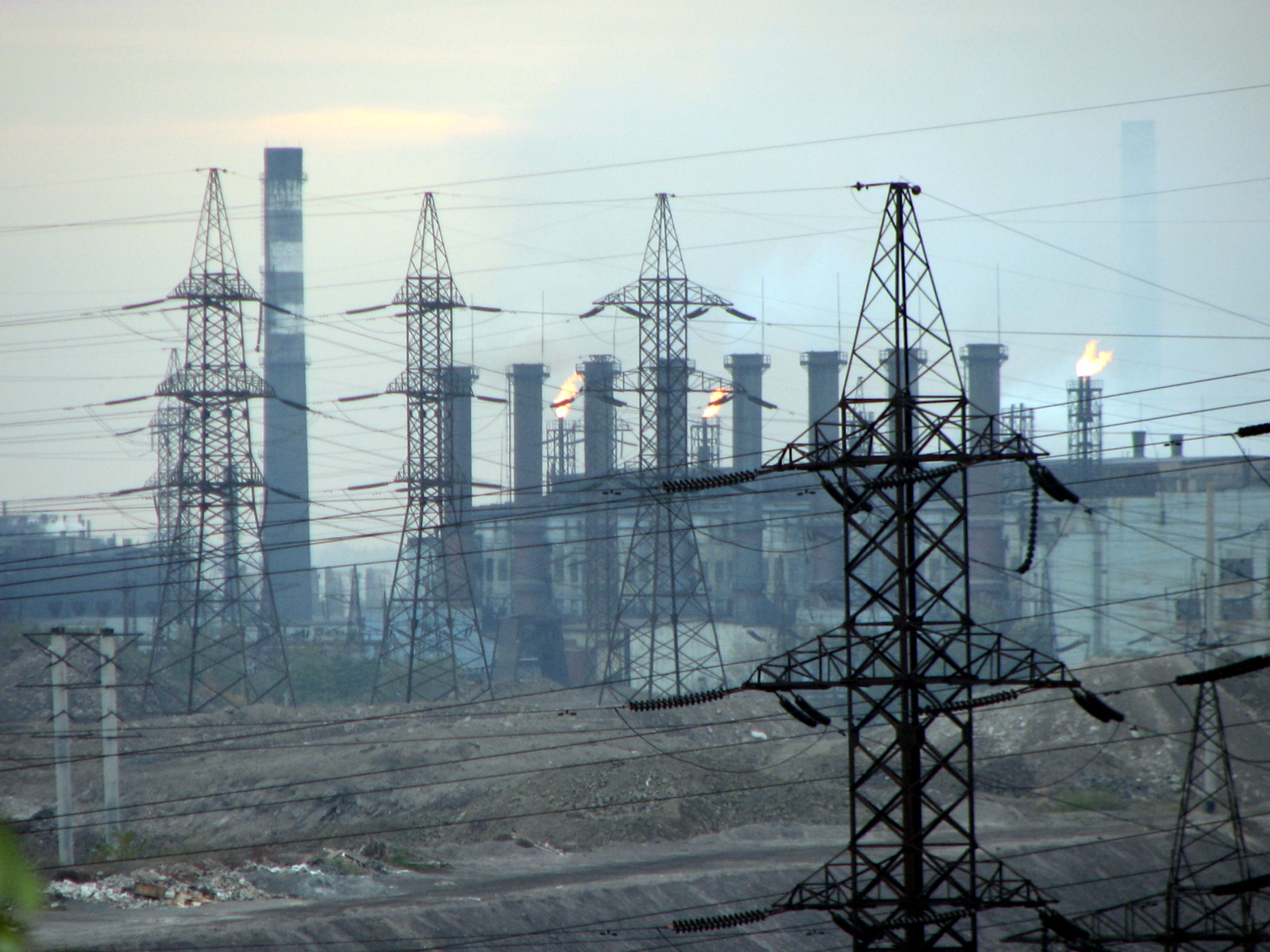
Industry

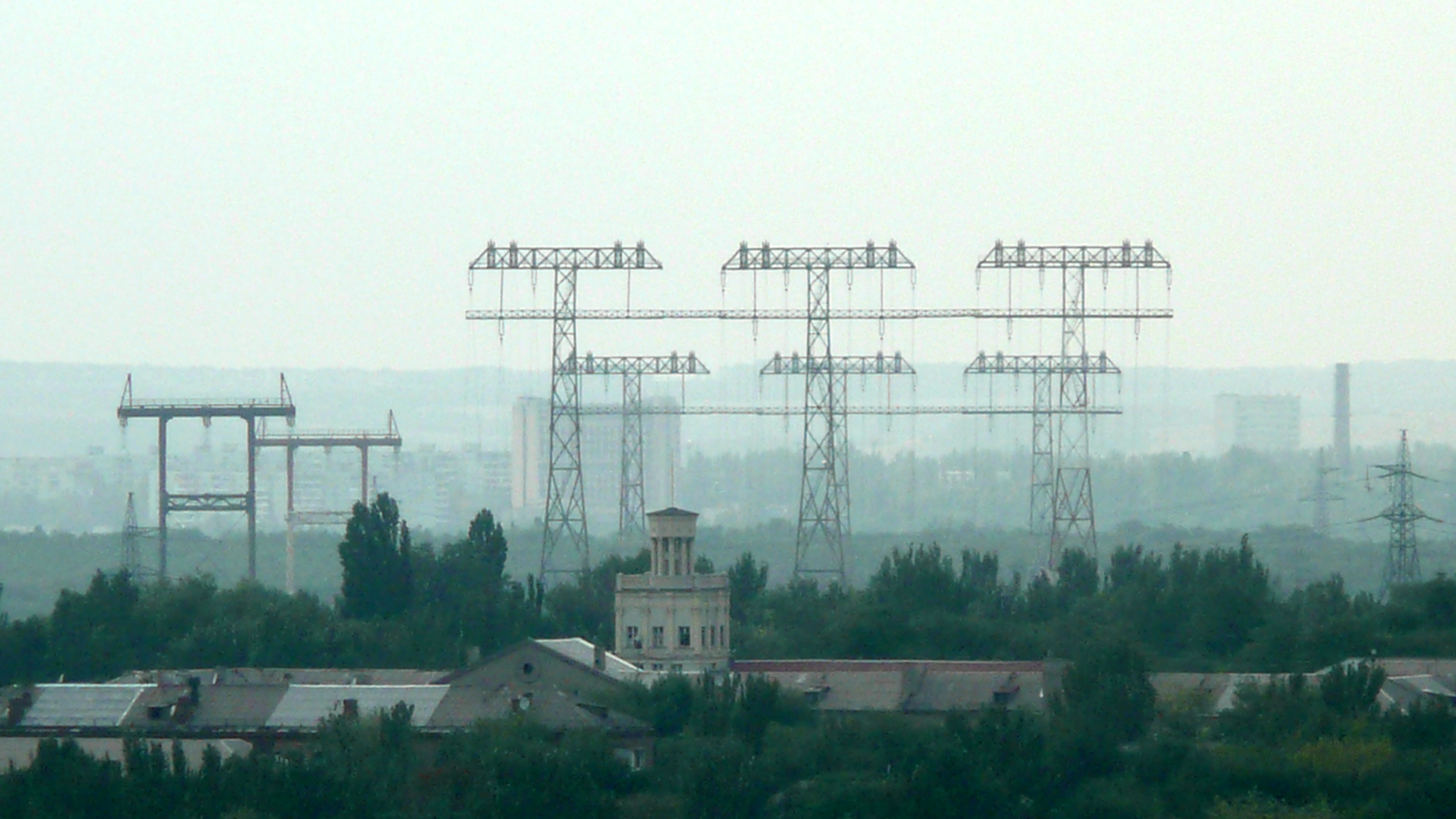
Industry

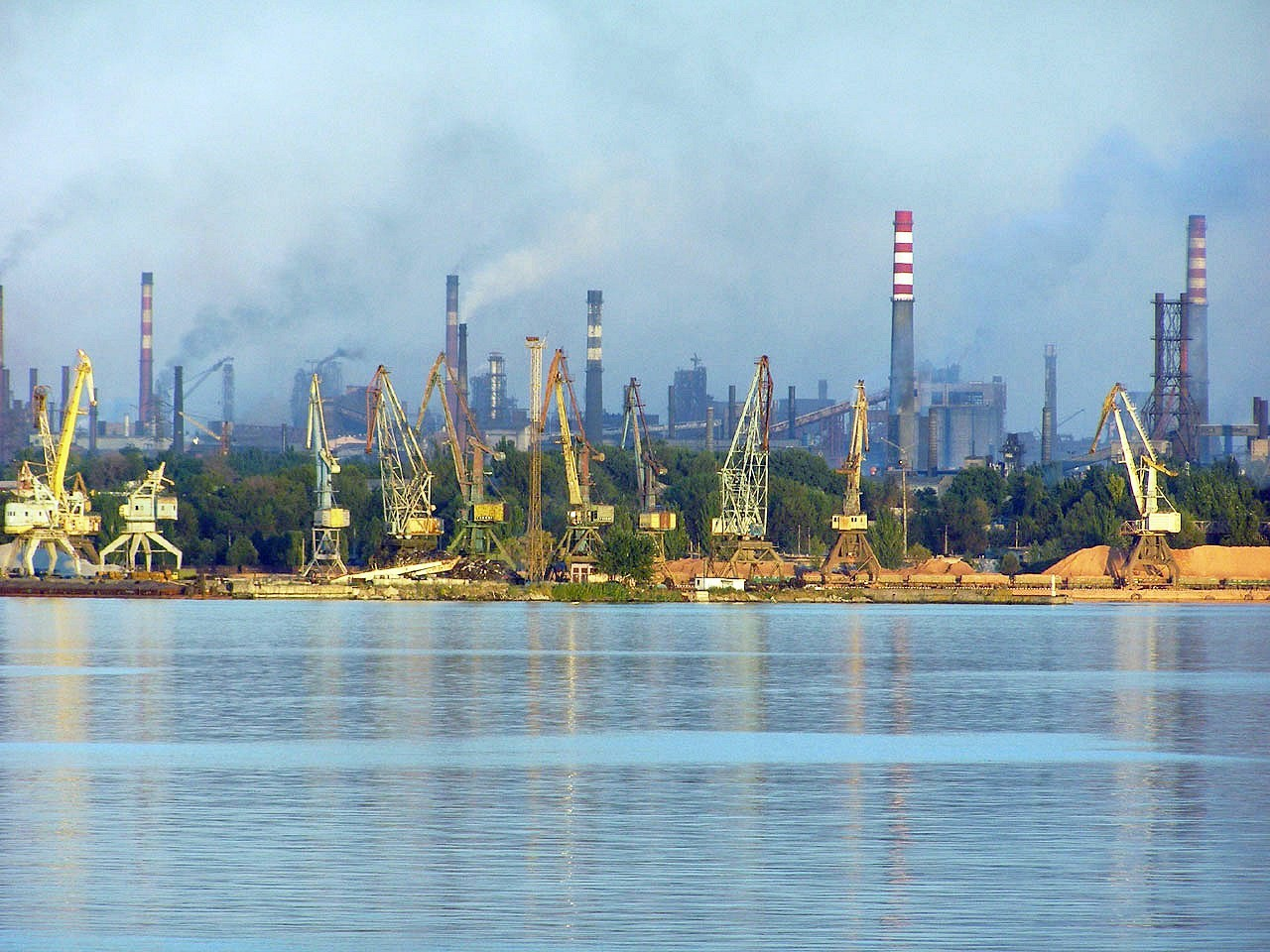
View of the district from the right-bank
