= Zaporizhstal =

Ukrainian steel maker

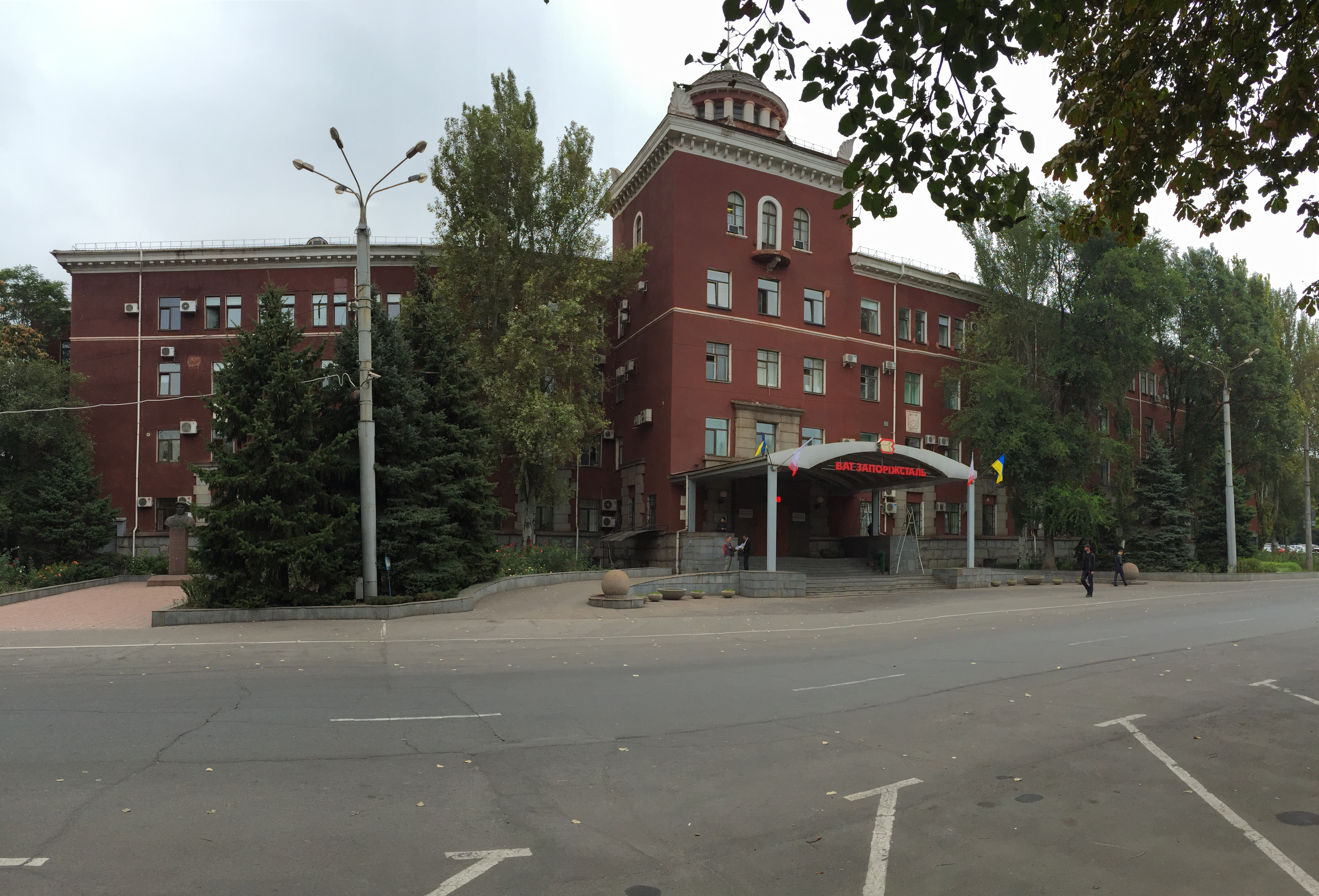
- The company's headquarters in Zaporizhzhia
- Type: PJSC
- ISIN: UA4000071435
- Industry: Ferrous metallurgy
- Founded: 1933
- Headquarters: Zaporizhzhia, Ukraine
- Key people: Oleksandr Myronenko (CEO)
- Products: Cast iron, steel, cold-rolled sheets
- Revenue: 72,014,156,000 hryvnia (2025)
- Total assets: 94,284,652,000 hryvnia (2025)
- Number of employees: 8,569 (2023)
- Parent: Metinvest
- Website: www.zaporizhstal.com

The Zaporizhstal Iron and Steel Works (Ukrainian: Запорізький металургійний комбінат «Запоріжсталь») is a steel mill based in Zaporizhzhia, Ukraine. It was founded in 1933 and later became the country's fourth-largest steel maker, up until operations were stopped in 2026 due to the ongoing Russian war.

In August 2026, the steelworks was shut down indefinitely, as a result of damage caused by Russian ballistic missile strikes. The plants facilities had been hit on 11 and 27 August 2026, resulting in the death of eight workers, and twenty six injured. Blast furnaces, coking facilities, power and rail infrastructure were critically damaged.

== Ownership ==
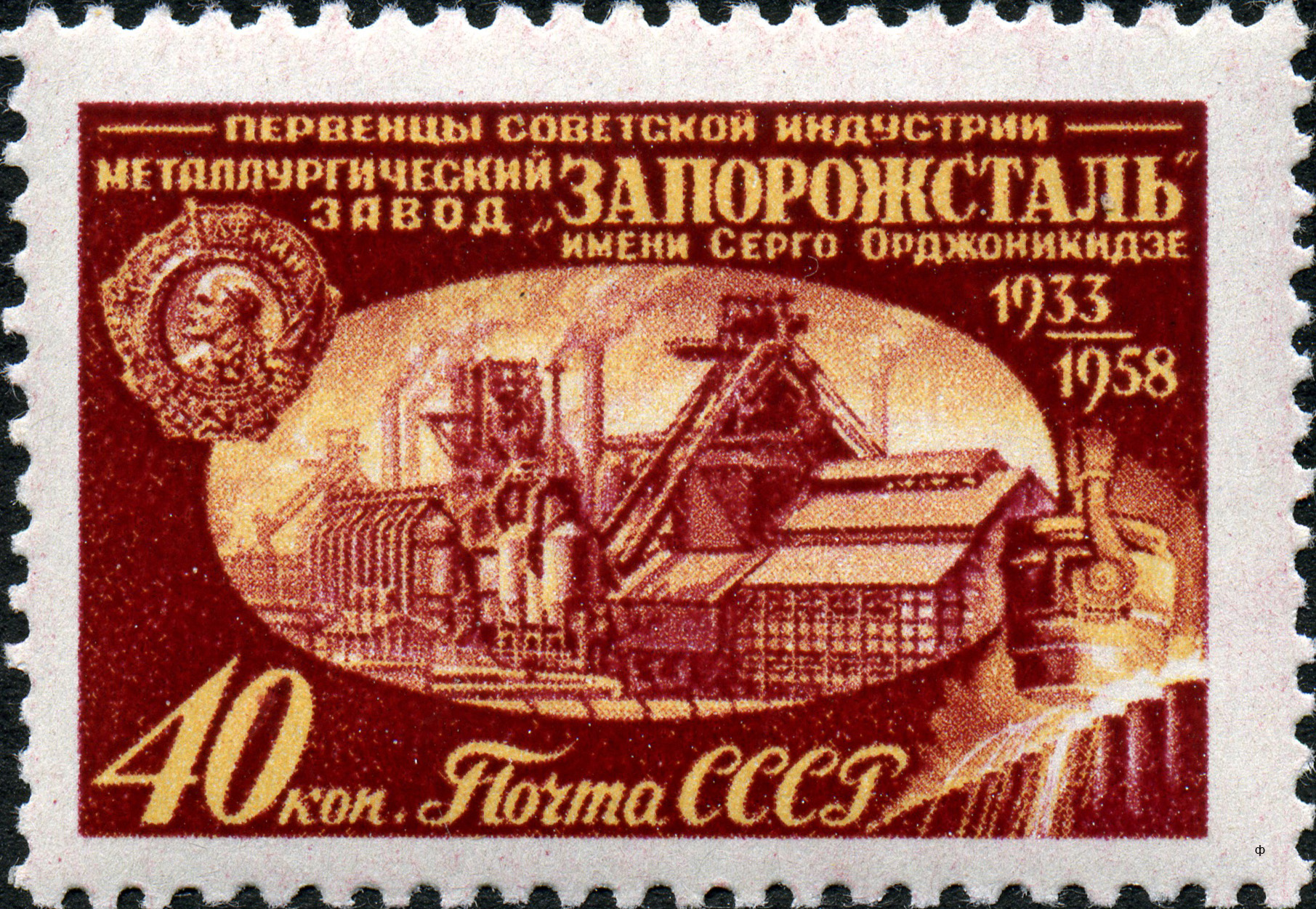
The 1958 post stamp "Pioneers of the Soviet Industry"

After the collapse of the USSR and the independence of Ukraine, the mill fell into the hands of the Ukrainian government. When privatization began in the mid-1990s, Vasily Khmelnytsky, an ambitious politician-turned-businessman, was named manager of the state's stake in the plant, and subsequently engineered the insider sale of many shares of the plant to his own investment company.

The Ukrainian government began offering shares in Zaporizhstal in cash auctions in 1999. By 2001, Vasyl Khmelnytsky and a consortium led by the Midland Group controlled 93% of the mill. According to court documents, the Midland Group sold its 50% stake in 2009 to then-independent investment bank Troika Dialog following a bidding war that included other Zaporizhstal shareholders. However, The Wall Street Journal reports that the mill was sold in an offshore transaction that included five separate companies and was financed by Russian state-owned Vnesheconombank. It's unclear how this reporting relates to the UK court record of the sale to Troika.

A Ukrainian holding company, Metinvest, eventually became full owners of the mill in 2013.

== Production ==
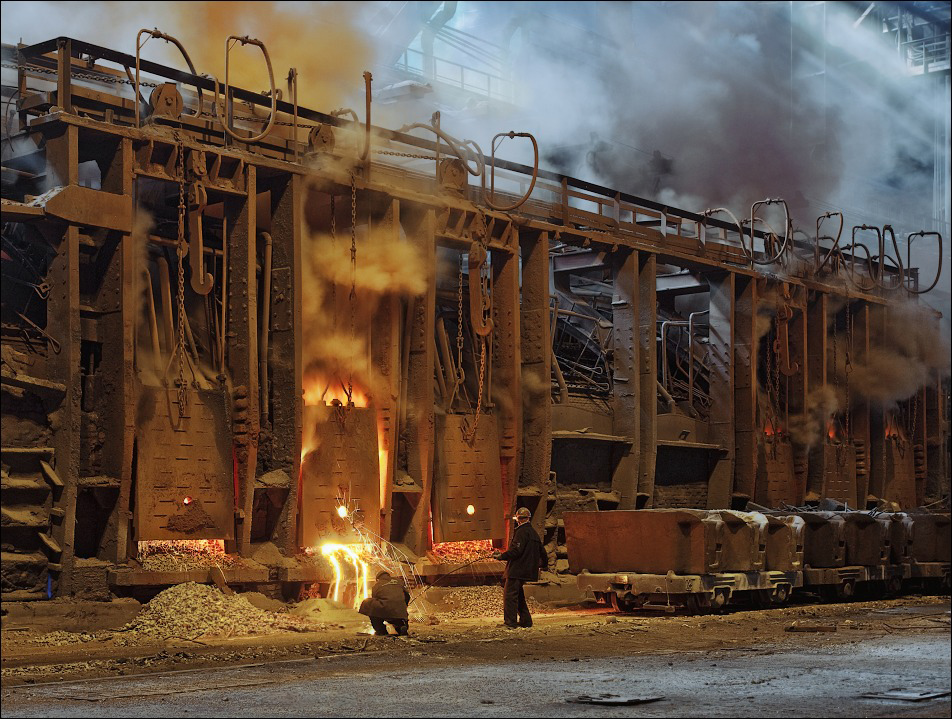
One of seven 500-ton capacity open hearth furnaces at the steel plant, pictured in 2012

In 2003, the company produced 4.3 million tonnes of raw steel (market share of 12%) and 3.6 million tonnes of finished steel products (11% share). Exports, delivered to 59 countries, accounted for 70% of Zaporizhstal's 2003 sales, with China, Middle Eastern states and the CIS among the main destinations. In 2015, the company has made 3.81 million tonnes of cast iron, 3.98 million tonnes of steel, 3.35 million tonnes of rolled steel.

At one point, the plant had an annual capacity of 4.5 million tonnes of steel, 3.3 million tonnes of pig iron, and 4.1 million of finished steel products, and ranked 54th in the world. The company was Ukraine's only manufacturer of cold-rolled sheets, used in car manufacturing, as well as tinplates and polished stainless and alloyed steel. Zaporizhstal is located in the city of Zaporizhzhia, in a region with the highest per capita electricity output in Ukraine, close to raw material suppliers and steel consumers (pipe and machine building companies).

Zaporizhstal was particularly notable for its continued use of open hearth furnaces, a now archaic method of production. The mill has four blast furnaces, seven open hearth furnaces and one twin hearth furnace.

In August 2026, the steelworks was shut down indefinitely, as a result of damage caused by Russian ballistic missile strikes. The plants facilities had been hit on 11 and 27 August 2026, resulting in the death of eight workers, and twenty six injured. Blast furnaces, coking facilities, power and rail infrastructure were critically damaged. Further factors that contributed to the shutdown of the plant were the breakdown of rail and shipping, as well as the negative effect of the EU Carbon Border Adjustment Mechanism on the Ukrainian steel industry.

By September 2026, production had fully stopped indefinitely, after several blast furnaces were severely damaged by missile attacks.

== Directors ==
- 1934—1937 — Isak Rohachevskyi
- 1937—1948 — Anatoliy Kuzmin
- 1948—1956 — Anastas Boborykin
- 1956—1982 — Lev Yupko
- 1982—1986 — Oleksandr Herasymenko
- 1986—2012 — Vitaliy Satskyi
- 2012—2019 — Rostyslav Shurma
- from 2019 — Oleksandr Myronenko

== Awards ==
- Order of Lenin
- Order of the October Revolution

== See also ==
- Zaporizhzhia Foundry and Mechanical Plant
