= Khartsyzk pipe plant =

Khartsyzsk pipe plant
- Company type: Subsidiary
- Industry: pipe
- Founded: 1913
- Headquarters: Khartsyzk, Ukraine
- Products: pipe
- Revenue: 14,793,300 hryvnia (2025)
- Total assets: 9,483,800 hryvnia (2025)
- Parent: Metinvest
- Website: pipe.metinvestholding.com

PJSC Khartsyzk Pipe Plant is located in Khartsyzk city, Donetsk Oblast, Ukraine. The enterprise started pipe production in 1897. Construction lasted almost four years and after coming on stream, the plant became, known as Khartsyzk Boiler and Mechanical Plant. The plant became known as Pipe Plant in 1913, when the pipe shop for manufacturing steel pipes was constructed.

== Production ==
Khartsyzk Tube Works was the largest producer in the Commonwealth of Independent States of longitudinal electric-welded pipes with diameter from 478 to 1422 mm for pipelines and heat networks. The company is a member of Division of steel and rolled products company Metinvest Holding.
