= Azovstal Iron and Steel Works =

Former metallurgical facility in Ukraine

Coordinates: 47°05′53″N 37°36′36″E

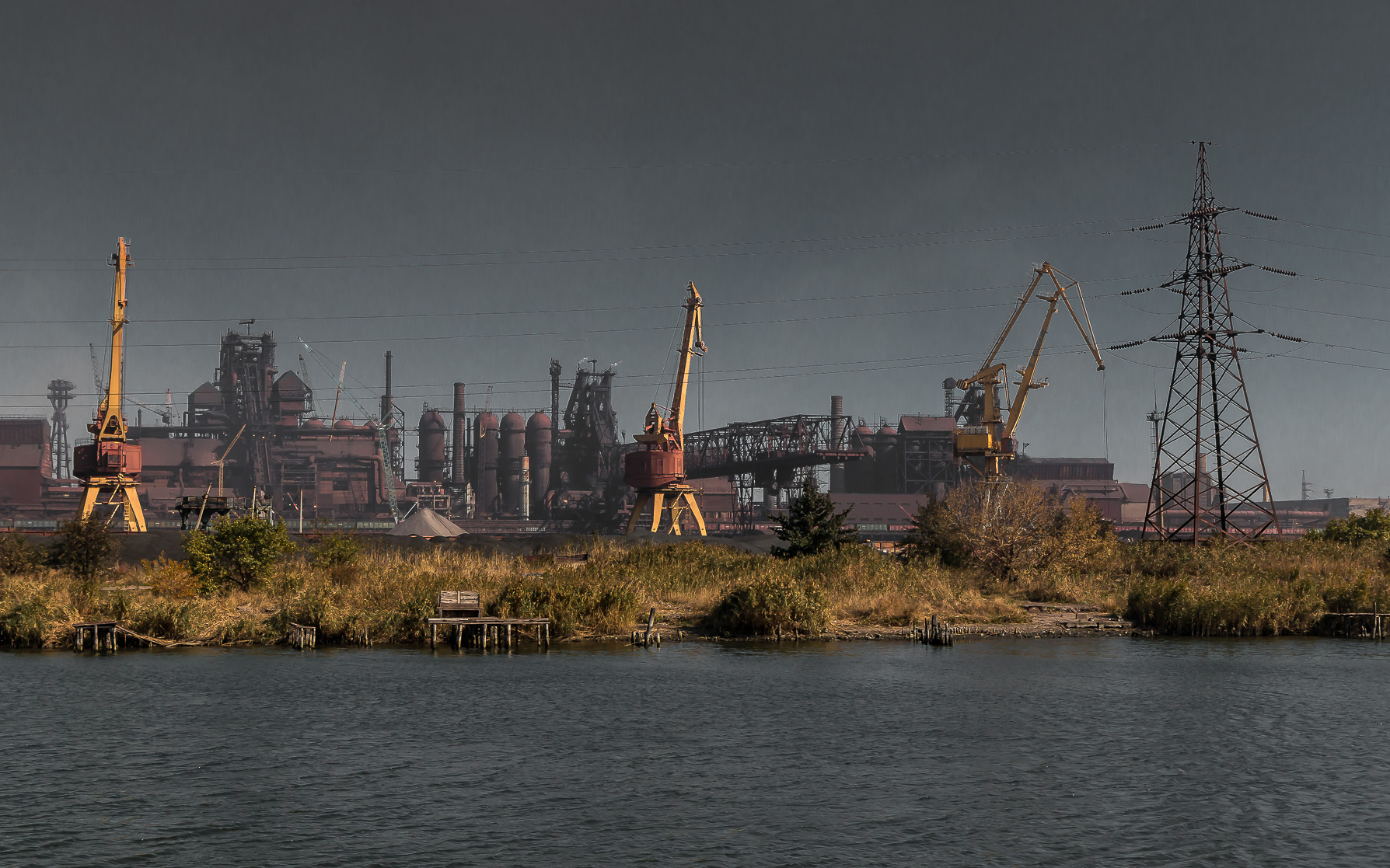
- Azovstal steel plant in 2014
- Native name: Mеталургійний Kомбінат Азовсталь
- Type: Private, Combine
- Traded as: PFTS: AZST
- Industry: Steel production
- Founded: 2 February 1930
- Defunct: 20 May 2022
- Fate: Destroyed during the siege of Mariupol
- Headquarters: Mariupol, Ukraine
- Key people: Rinat Akhmetov, Enver Tskitishvili (April 2011 – May 2022) (General Director)
- Net income: ₴558,417,000 (2016)
- Total assets: 3,329,490,000 hryvnia (2025)
- Owner: Metinvest B.V. Metinvest International
- Number of employees: 12,293 (2015)
- Parent: Metinvest
- Subsidiaries: Sigma TV Channel; Sygma TV Channel; Firma Marita; AzovMed
- Website: azovstal.metinvestholding.com

The Azovstal Iron and Steel Works, or Azovstal Metallurgical Combine (Ukrainian: Mеталургійний Kомбінат Азовсталь, pronounced [ɐˌzɔu̯ˈstɑl]; PFTS: AZST), was a metallurgical facility located in Mariupol in eastern Ukraine, and one of the largest steel rolling companies in the country.

The Azovstal plant became one of the most emblematic points of the siege of Mariupol during the Russian invasion of Ukraine. The plant had tunnels and bunkers capable of withstanding a nuclear attack, making it an extremely defensible position. As the Russian forces advanced into Mariupol, Ukrainian forces withdrew to Azovstal, and by late April 2022 it became the last pocket of Ukrainian resistance in the city. The battle of Azovstal occurred on the site, culminating in the surrender of the remaining Ukrainian defenders after over a month of resistance.

The plant was almost completely destroyed by Russian bombardment over the course of the battle. After the capture of Mariupol, the Russians announced plans for the remains of the plant to be demolished during the city's restoration.

== History ==
=== Soviet era ===
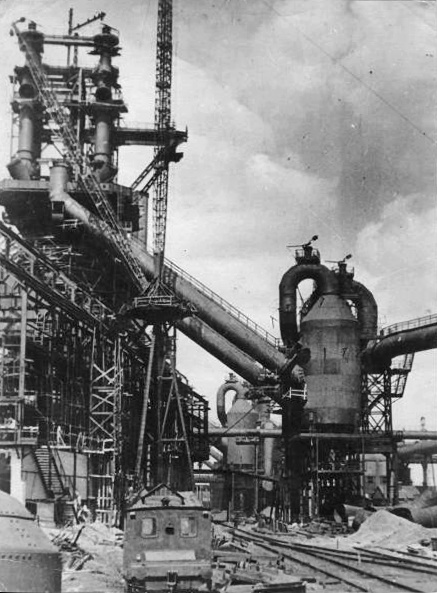
New blast furnace at Azovstal, 1940

Azovstal was established in 1930 in Mariupol, Ukrainian SSR (Soviet Union) by the decision of the Presidium of the Supreme Soviet of the National Economy (BCHX) (USSR). During its construction, a Neolithic cemetery was discovered on the grounds, and from August to October, 124 graves and many sets of grave goods were excavated, with its finds publicized in 1933.

During World War II, German forces occupied the plant from October 1941. As part of the German Ivan Program (1942–1943) the plant was used to produce ammunition from 1942 onward. In September 1943, upon the city's recapture by Soviet forces, the plant was rebuilt.

=== Ukrainian independence ===
In 1991, after the independence of Ukraine, the plant became a property of the Ukrainian state. In 1996, the state started its privatization. The plant became owned by Metinvest, a metallurgical company solely owned by the Ukrainian business conglomerate Systems Capital Management.

In 2005, the plant produced 5.906 million tons of steel. From 2006, it partnered with the Priazovskiy State Technical University to help streamline students into working at the site. In 2011, it was the country's third largest steel producer, accounting for 15% of the entire steel output, and known as a large exporter of steel slabs and billets. In 2014, the bunkers under the plant were used when Russian-backed Donbas separatists tried to take Mariupol from the Ukrainian government.

=== Russian invasion of Ukraine ===
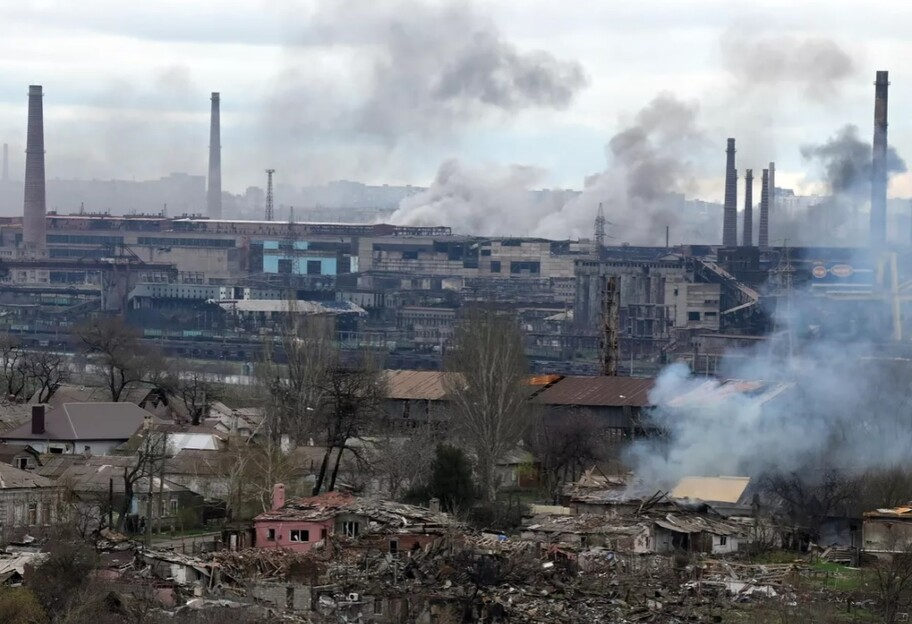
Smoke rising from the Azovstal plant during fighting in the siege of Mariupol

In March 2022, during the siege of Mariupol, the works were badly damaged, with Ukrainian parliament member Serhiy Taruta stating that Russian forces had "practically destroyed the factory". By 16 April, it became the last pocket of organized resistance in the siege. Russian forces gave the defenders until 6:00 am Moscow Time on 17 April to surrender, claiming that if they left behind their weapons, they would guarantee their lives. Ukrainian forces refused to surrender, and portions of the plant remained under their control.

On 4 May, Russian troops claimed to have entered the steel plant after launching an all-out offensive. However, this was refuted by Ukrainian sources, claiming they had repelled some Russian attacks. On 7 May, Deputy Prime Minister Iryna Vereshchuk stated that "all women, children, and the elderly" had been evacuated from Azovstal. According to The New York Times, the Azov Battalion was ordered to surrender by the Ukrainian General Staff on 16 May, who said it was necessary "to save the lives of the personnel".

Rap group Kalush Orchestra, who represented Ukraine in the Eurovision Song Contest 2022 and later won the competition, called to save the soldiers at Azovstal onstage following their performance. This contributed to a sharp increase in global interest in Azovstal.

On 17 May 2022, 53 seriously injured people surrendered and were evacuated from Azovstal to a medical facility in Novoazovsk and 211 people were taken to Olenivka through the humanitarian corridor, marking the end of the combat mission in Mariupol and the defense of the Azovstal plant after 82 days of fighting. Following the capture of Mariupol by the DPR and Russian forces and the surrender of remaining Ukrainian servicemen in Azovstal, Denis Pushilin announced that the plant would be demolished and that "other projects are planned in place of Azovstal". On February 25, 2023, Pushilin announced that a technopark would be built on the territory of Azovstal.

== Environmental impacts ==
In a 1999 study, it was found that the site had been identified by a regional environmental protection agency as the second largest air polluter in the region. To attempt to lessen pollution amounts, a small pilot program was first implemented to mitigate pollution caused by graphite and smelter fumes, and was introduced in a larger scale after beneficial outcomes were shown. The site also implemented regular pollution prevention audits each year.

As a result of lax environmental regulations and "totally obsolete" equipment used by Azovstal and other Metinvest-owned factories in the city, Mariupol was what National Geographic described as "one of the most polluted cities" in Ukraine. In 2018 and 2019, residents of Mariupol protested in the streets for reform.

== Layout ==
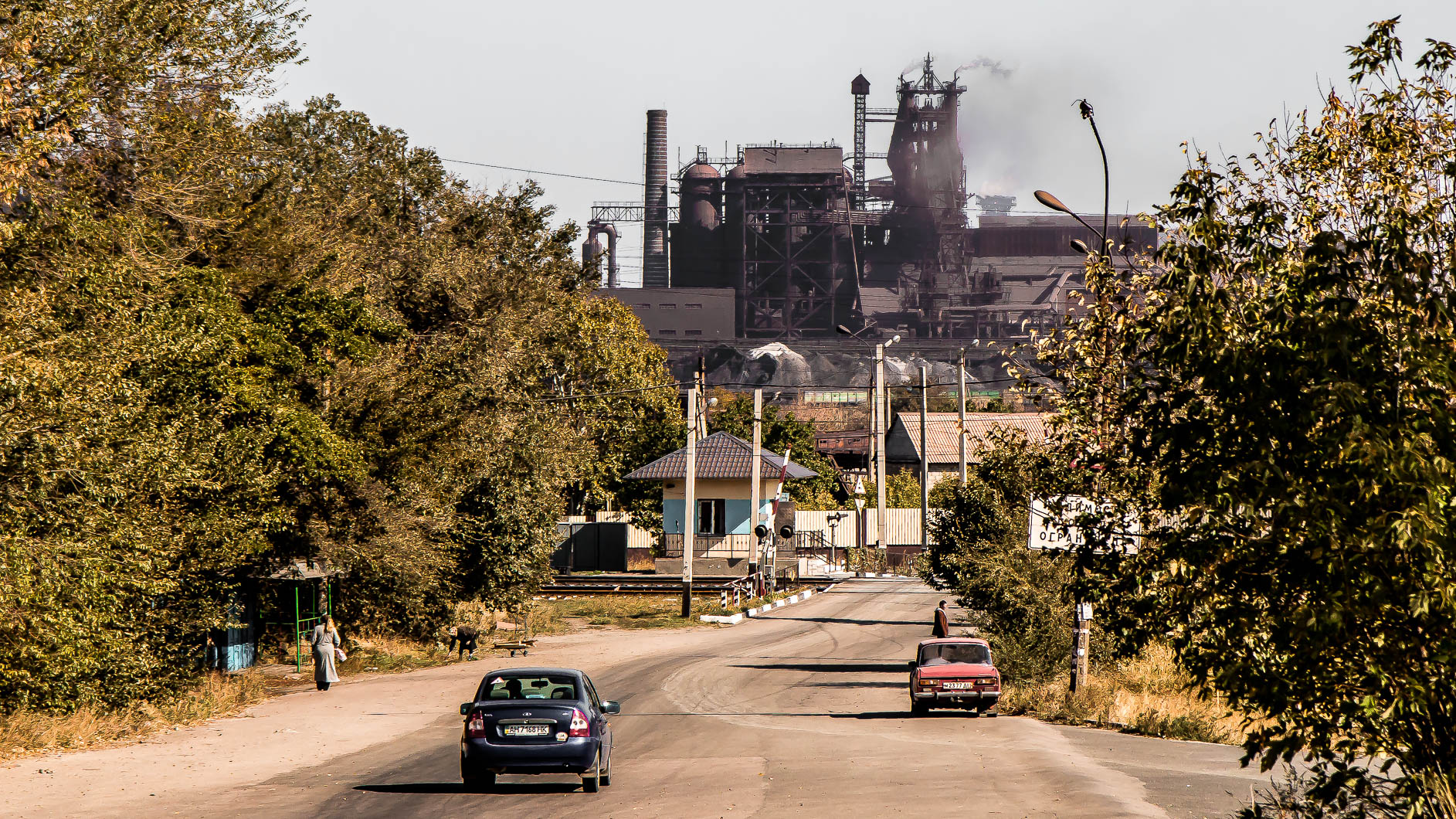
View of the factory furnaces

The works included coke production, a sinter plant, six blast furnaces and a steel-making complex.

== Management ==
The steel plant operated as a subsidiary of Metinvest Holding LLC, in turn, a subsidiary of Metinvest B.V., at the time of the siege.

Rinat Akhmetov is co-owner of Metinvest B.V. Akhmetov supported the Ukrainian forces in the fight for Mariupol: "Mariupol has always been and will be a Ukrainian city. Ukrainians fiercely defend every inch of Ukrainian soil. I am proud that Azovstal is our bastion of resistance".

== See also ==
- Azot (Sievierodonetsk), last Ukrainian position in Sievierodonetsk before its fall to Russia
- Azovstal railway station
- Metal production in Ukraine
