= Zaporizhzhia Ferroalloy Plant =

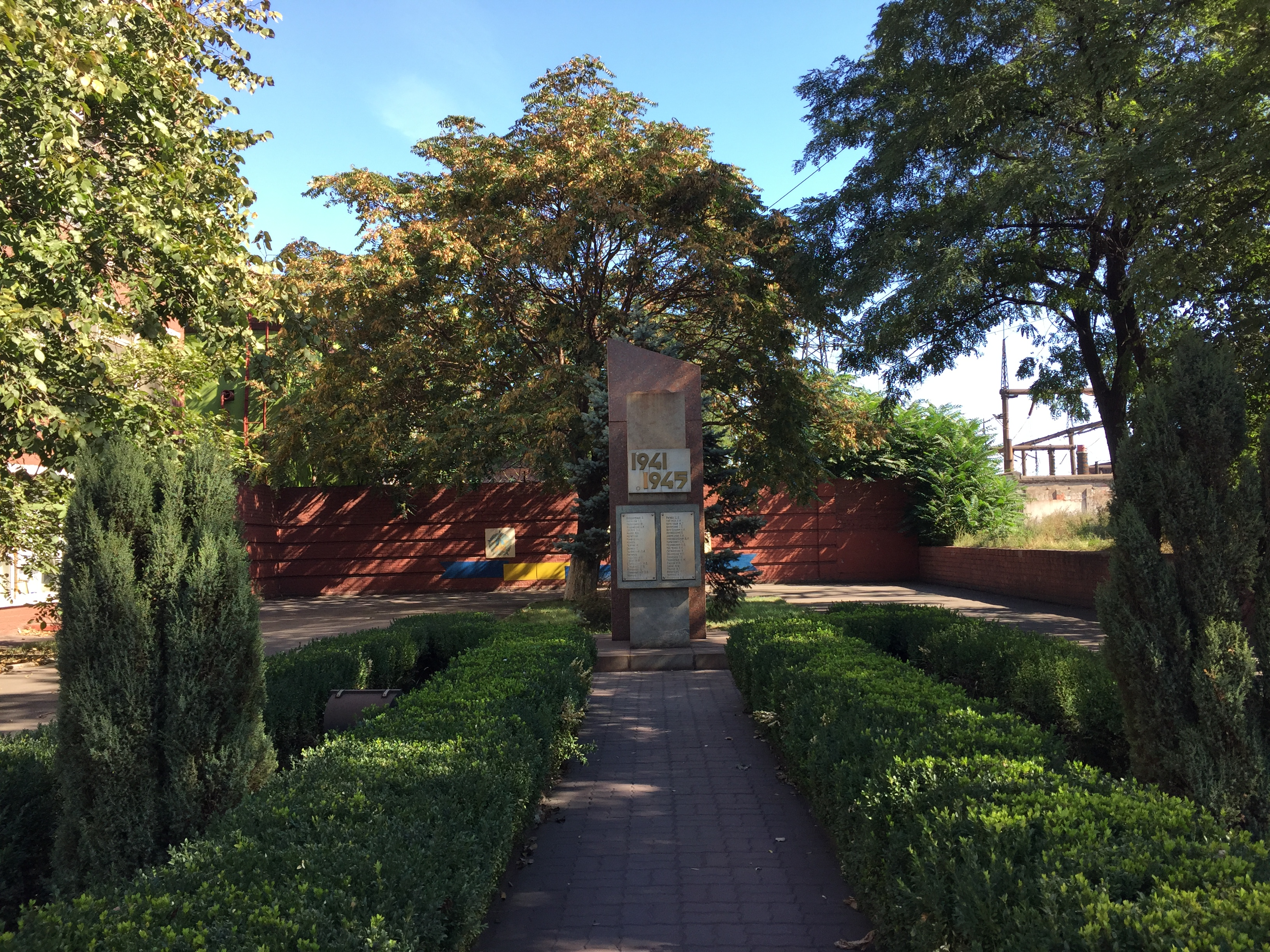
- Monument to the fallen workers of the ferroalloy plant in Zaporizhia.
- Native name: Запорізький завод феросплавів
- Type: Business, public company
- Industry: Ferrous metallurgy
- Founded: 1933
- Headquarters: City of Zaporizhzhia, Zaporizhzhia Oblast, Ukraine
- Key people: Head of Plant: Pavlo Oleksandrovych Kravchenko
- Revenue: 1,522,567,000 hryvnia (2025)
- Total assets: 4,846,090,000 hryvnia (2025)
- Number of employees: 3043
- Website: zfz.com.ua
- Footnotes; Code: ЄДРПОУ 00186542

Zaporizhzhia Ferroalloy Plant (OJSC) produces ferrosilicon (47.7% of the Ukrainian market), carbon ferromanganese, and metallic manganese (100% of the Ukrainian market) which are used in the metallurgical industry for alloying of steel, alloys, and cast iron. Suppliers of raw materials include Ukrainian companies: Pokrovsky GZK, Marganetsky GZK, Azovstal, Avdiivsky, and Novotroitskye Rudoupravlinnya. Products are exported both directly and through traders. The company produces some products on a toll scheme.

== History ==
The plant began operations in 1933. Workshop 2 of ferrochrome has been operating since October 10, 1933. Workshop 1 of ferrochrome began operating in 1934. Then the equipment was transported to Stalinsk, Russia, which is now called Novokuznetsk. From 1944 to 1948 it produced calcium carbide. After the Second World War restoration of the plant began in 1948. It was rebuilt in early December 1951. In 1955, Workshop 3 for the production of ferromanganese was introduced. In 1958, Workshop 4 for the production of ferrosilicon was introduced. In 1971 the company was awarded the Order of the Red Banner of Labour.

After the restoration of Ukraine's independence in 1991, the state-owned enterprise was transformed into an open joint-stock company. In 1993 it was incorporated. The owner is PrivatBank. In August 1997, the plant was included in the list of enterprises of strategic importance for the economy and security of Ukraine. In 1998, the Ukrainian Association of Ferroalloy Manufacturers (UkrFA) was established, which included the plant. In September 2005, the plant began production of ferrosilicoaluminum (composed of 15–20% aluminum and 50–70% silicon), which was mastered on the furnace No. 1, which previously produced ferrosilicon.

== Production ==
=== 2017 ===
- Ferromanganese FMn78 – 43 thousand tons
- Ferrosilicon FS65 – 55 thousand tons
- Ferrosilicon FS75 – 30 thousand tons
- Manganese metal Mn95 – 8 thousand tons

== Interesting facts ==
The company sponsors the basketball club – Ferro.

The company publishes the periodical "Ferosplavnik."

== See also ==
- Stakhanovsky Ferroalloy Plant
