= Ingulets Iron Ore Dressing Works =

Processing plant in Ukraine

Inhulets Iron Ore Dressing Works
- Company type: Subsidiary
- Industry: Mining
- Founded: 1965; 61 years ago
- Headquarters: Inhuletskyi District, Kryvyi Rih, Ukraine
- Products: Iron ore
- Parent: Metinvest
- Website: ingok.metinvestholding.com

Inhulets Iron Ore Dressing Works (InGZK) (Russian: InGOK) is a mining and processing plant which produces metallurgical products. The company is based in the Inhulets exclave neighborhood of Inhuletskyi District, Kryvy Rih, Ukraine. Inhulets GZK sources iron ore from the deposits of ferruginous (iron oxide-containing) quartzite at the Inhulets deposit.

== History ==
1996 is considered the year of establishment of InGOK, when the first merchant iron ore concentrate was produced.

By 1978, the peak output was recorded in GOK over its history when 14,587 Ktonnes of concentrate was produced.

In 2001, the billionth tonne of concentrate produced.

In 2007, Inhulets GZK was acquired by Metinvest.

In 2009, Inhulets GZK's output was 11.3 million tonnes of merchant iron ore concentrate.

== Production ==
Inhulets GZK mines iron ore from its one open-pit quartzite field through a process of drilling and blasting, and by the removal of overburden to external dumps. The iron ore is then transported by rail to, and refined at, Inhulets GZK's beneficiation and flotation facilities. The company's product range includes granite overburden goods, expanded plastic goods and community services.

== Infrastructure ==
GZK's infrastructure includes 17 structural units (workshops), among them 7 principal ones.

== Exports ==
Inhulets GZK exports its products to Austria, Bulgaria, Romania, Slovakia, Czech Republic, Hungary, Poland and the countries of the Commonwealth of Independent States.
