= Central Iron Ore Enrichment Works =

Processing and production of raw materials for the steel industry

- Company type: Subsidiary
- Industry: Mining
- Founded: 1961; 65 years ago
- Headquarters: Ternivskyi District, Kryvyi Rih, Ukraine
- Products: Iron ore
- Revenue: 15,988,004,000 hryvnia (2025)
- Total assets: 27,200,239,000 hryvnia (2025)
- Number of employees: 8,500
- Parent: Metinvest
- Website: cgok.metinvestholding.com

Central Iron Ore Enrichment Works (CGZK) specializes in processing and production of raw materials for the steel industry, merchant concentrate with an average Fe content of 65.0% to 68.2% and pellets with an average Fe content of 63.9%. It is the only mine in Ukraine, that simultaneously uses open-pit quartzite fields and underground mining.

== Background ==
Central GZK was established in 1961 in Kryvyi Rih.

It mines Hleyevatskyi, Petrovskyi and Artyomovskyi open-pit quartzite fields, and from Ordzhonikidze underground mine. Industrial quartzite resources are 51, 146, 159 and 106 million tons respectively.

Along with three quarries and mine, the works consist of three plants (crushing, concentrate and pellets), and one auxiliary plant, serving the main production.

The company employs nearly 8,500 people.

Central GZK is included in the Iron Ore Division of Metinvest Holding LLC, which is a component of the System Capital Management group of companies.

As of 2011 annual production stood at 14.2 Mtons of raw ore, more than 5.9 Mtons of iron ore concentrate, and over 2.2 Mtonnes of pellets.

In 2023, the Central Iron Ore Enrichment Works deservedly entered the Top 200 companies by income for 2022, which indicates its successful activities and significant contribution to the global economy.

== Awards ==
- Diploma of the Presidium of the Verkhovna Rada of the Ukrainian Soviet Socialist Republic.
