= Metinvest =

Ukraine-based international group of steel and mining companies

- Type: Vertically integrated group of companies, public company and private company
- Industry: Mining and metals
- Founded: 6 June 2006
- Founders: System Capital Management, Metinvest B.V.
- Headquarters: 80 Pivdenne Highway, Zaporizhzhia, Ukraine
- Area served: Worldwide
- Key people: Yuriy Ryzhenkov (CEO), Rinat Akhmetov, Vadym Novynskyi
- Revenue: 18,005,000,000 United States dollar (2021)
- Total assets: 17,426,755,000 hryvnia (2025)
- Owner: SCM (71.24%); Smart Holding Group (23.76%)
- Number of employees: 90,000 (2022)
- Subsidiaries: Zaporizhstal and Southern GOK joint ventures, Metinvest International
- Website: www.metinvestholding.com

Metinvest is a group of steel and mining companies that owns operations in Ukraine, Italy, Bulgaria, the UK and the US. The company mines ore and coal, produces coke, smelts steel and produces rolled products, pipes and other steel products. The group's assets are managed by Metinvest Holding LLC.

== History ==
=== 2006 ===
On 6 June 2006, Metinvest Holding LLC, the management company of Metinvest Group, was founded.100% stake acquired in Leman Ukraine LLC, a leading Ukrainian wholesale and retail metal trading company, and 27% stake acquired in Yenakiieve Iron and Steel Works (also known as Enakievsky Metallurgicheskij Zavod or EMZ).

=== 2007 ===
In October 2007, Metinvest became the first Ukrainian member of the World Steel Association (Worldsteel; formerly the International Iron and Steel Institute, or IISI) In November 2007, the group acquired 82.5% of Ingulets Iron Ore Mining and Processing Plant (Ingulets GOK, in Kryvyi Rih, Dnipropetrovsk region), one of Ukraine's largest mining companies.

=== 2008 ===
In January 2008, Metinvest completed the acquisition of a 100% stake in the rolling businesses of Trametal S.p.A. (Italy) and Spartan UK Ltd (UK) from Italy's Malacalza family.

In June 2008, SRK Consulting conducted the first JORC-compliant audit of Metinvest's open-pit reserves (Northern GOK, Central GOK and Ingulets GOK).

In July 2008, Metinvest acquired a 51% stake in NPO Incor & Co LLC (New York, Donetsk region), one of Europe's largest chemical producers.

=== 2009 ===
In April 2009, Metinvest completed the acquisition of a 100% stake in United Coal Company, one of the leading coking coal producers in the US.

In September 2009, Metinvest became the first Ukrainian company to receive Climate Action certification from the World Steel Association.

In December 2009, Metinvest acquired a 95% stake in the Bulgarian rolling company Promet Steel AD.

=== 2010 ===
In January 2010, Metinvest published its first social report in accordance with the Global Reporting Initiative (GRI), an international sustainability reporting standard.

In March 2010, the group became a member of the United Nations Global Compact initiative.

In July 2010, Metinvest and Ilyich Iron and Steel Works (Ilyich Steel, Mariupol, Donetsk region) decided to merge their assets.

In October 2010, Metinvest consolidated a 90.2% interest in Makiivka Steel CJSC (Makiivka, Donetsk region).

In December 2010, the group completed the registration of its products under European Regulation No 1907/2006 (REACH).

=== 2011 ===
In May 2011, Azovstal (Mariupol, Donetsk region) decommissioned its open-hearth plant.

In July 2011, Metinvest acquired 50% of the steel business of Industrial Group, which operated Zaporizhstal PJSC (Zaporizhzhia), one of Europe's largest steelmaking companies.

=== 2012 ===
In 2012, during the First National Steel Construction Market Participants' Conference in Kyiv, Metinvest was one of 12 Ukrainian companies that initiated the creation of the industry association Steel Industry Directory – Trade Associations, and later became one of its founders.

In July 2012, Metinvest completed the acquisition of a 49.9% stake in Zaporizhstal PJSC.

In December 2012, Metinvest decided to close the sinter plant at Azovstal.

=== 2013 ===
In May 2013, Metinvest acquired a 39.74% stake in Zaporizhneupor PJSC (Zaporizhzhia), Ukraine's largest producer of refractory products. In 2013, SCM Group and Smart-Holding transferred to Metinvest 23.5% in Central Mining and Processing Plant PJSC, 15% in Northern Mining and Processing Plant PJSC, 26% in Zaporozhkoks PJSC, 31.3% in Donetskkoks PJSC and 3.1% in Ingulets Iron Ore Mining and Processing Plant PJSC.

=== 2014 ===
In July 2014, SCM and Smart-Holding announced the completion of the merger of their mining and metals assets within Metinvest B.V.

=== 2015 ===
In May 2015, Ilyich Steel decommissioned its open-hearth plant.

In 2015, Metinvest established Metinvest-Promservice, a company specialising in maintenance and repair of equipment at all the group's steel assets and third-party organisations.

=== 2016 ===
In March 2016, Metinvest signed a social partnership agreement with the Mariupol Development Foundation.

In August 2016, the Zaporizhzhia Foundry and Mechanical Plant (ZLMZ) started operating in Zaporizhzhia.

In September 2016, the Metinvest Green Centre public union was established in Kryvyi Rih.

=== 2017 ===
In March 2017, Metinvest reported that it had lost control over Yenakiieve Steel and its Makiivka branch, Yenakiieve Coke, Khartsyzsk Pipe, Komsomolskoye mining company, Krasnodon Coal PJSC, Donetsk Coke PJSC and Metalen LLC, a joint Ukrainian-Swiss venture, following its refusal to re-register these enterprises in the unrecognised Donetsk People's Republic (DPR) and Luhansk People's Republic (LPR).

=== 2018 ===
In 2018, Metinvest bought a 23.71% stake in metallurgical coke producer Yuzhcoke (Southern Coke; formerly Evraz Yuzhcoke, Kamianske, Dnipropetrovsk region) and acquired 100% of the shares in galvanised steel producer Unisteel (Kryvyi Rih, Dnipropetrovsk region).

In 2018, Metinvest acquired a 24.99% stake in Pokrovske Colliery and Sviato-Varvarynska Beneficiation Factory (Pokrovsk and Pokrovsk district, Donetsk region), which together form Ukraine's largest coal mining complex.

=== 2019 ===
In 2019, the group acquired a 49.37% stake in Dniprovskyy Coke and Chemical Plant (DKHZ, formerly Dniprodzerzhinskyy Coke and Chemical Plant named after S. yuıkuıyklr78 468ı region).

In 2019, Metinvest joined the Dutch Metal Industry Association (VNMI).

=== 2020 ===
In March 2020, Metinvest completed the purchase of a roughly 73% stake in Dniprovskyi Coke and Chemical Plant (Dnipro Coke).

In June 2020, Metinvest was ranked among the top 10 global steel companies by Sustainalytics, a leading provider of research, ratings and data on environmental, social and governance (ESG) issues. The company scored 32 points on a scale from 0 (lowest risk) to 100 (highest risk) according to the ESG risk assessment methodology.

In June 2020, Metinvest founded Ukraine's first private mining and metallurgical university, Metinvest Polytechnic, to provide training in the engineering professions demanded by Ukrainian industry.

In 2020, Metinvest spent about $6m to fight the coronavirus throughout the year. The group supplied oxygen to Ukrainian hospitals and donated medicine and equipment.

In 2020, Metinvest shareholder Rinat Akhmetov allocated ₴300 million to help Ukraine overcome the pandemic, uniting the efforts of the Charity Fund, DTEK and Metinvest companies and FC Shakhtar, which became partners in the anti-crisis headquarters in the west and east of the country.

=== 2021 ===
In March 2021, Metinvest gained control over Pokrovske Coal Group, Ukraine's largest producer of coking coal, which includes Pokrovske Colliery and Sviato-Varvarynska Beneficiation Factory.

In July 2021, Metinvest won the tender for the sale of the production complex of Dneprovskyi Iron Steel Works (DMK, Kamianske, Dnipropetrovsk region).

In December 2021, Metinvest Pokrovskugol is established to manage the operational and administrative changes at the Pokrovske Colliery Group.

=== 2022 ===
In 2022, Metinvest announced plans to invest more than $1.2 billion to modernis its facilities.

In February 2022, Dniprovskyi Metallurgic Plant (DMK) and Dnipro Coke (DKHZ) merge under the name Kamet Steel.

Since the start of the Russian invasion of Ukraine, the group has suspended production at Ilyich Steel and Azovstal in Mariupol. These enterprises suffered from shelling and suspended operations. As a result of Russia's aggression, the group as a whole reduced the production capacity of its enterprises by more than 40%.

During the first 100 days of the war, Metinvest spent more than UAH 1.5 billion to help the Ukrainian army, civilians and employees. Metinvest also produces decoys.

In 2022, Metinvest and DTEK, in coordination with the Rinat Akhmetov Foundation, created the Saving Lives humanitarian project, which had already helped 85,000 Ukrainians as of June 2022.

As of June 2022, Metinvest shareholder Rinat Akhmetov had donated €100 million to the Ukrainian Armed Forces and humanitarian aid to the population since the start of the Russian invasion.

== Shareholders and management ==
Metinvest is a mining and metals group that is beneficially owned by Rinat Akhmetov.

The main shareholders of the group are SCM (71.24%) and Smart Holding (23.76%), which participate in the management of Metinvest on a partnership basis. Metinvest Group's main holding company is Metinvest B.V. (Netherlands, registration number 24321697). From 2006 to 2013, the company was led by Ihor Syryy. In 2009, he was named the best top manager in Ukraine. Since 2013, the company has been headed by Yuriy Ryzhenkov. In 2020, he entered the list of Ukraine's top 25 CEOs.

== Structure ==
=== Mining ===
- Ingulets GOK, (Ukraine)
- Northern GOK (Ukraine)
- Central GOK (Ukraine)
- Southern GOK (Ukraine) — joint venture of Metinvest Group
- Pokrovske Coal (Ukraine)
- Komsomolskoye mining company (Ukraine)*
- Krasnodon Coal, (Ukraine)
- United Coal (United States)

=== Metallurgical ===
- Khartsyzsk pipe (Ukraine)
- Promet Steel (Bulgaria)
- Ferriera Valsider (Italy)
- Metinvest Trametal (Italy)
- Spartan UK (United Kingdom)
- Metinvest Resource (Ukraine)
- Inkor Chemicals (Ukraine)

Formerly active:

- Avdiivka Coke (Ukraine)
- Zaporizhstal (Ukraine) — joint venture of Metinvest Group
- Zaporizhzhia Foundry and Mechanical Plant (ZLMZ) (Ukraine)
- Kamet Steel (Ukraine)
- Unisteel (Ukraine)
- Yenakiieve Steel, (Ukraine)
- Zaporizhia Coke (Ukraine)
- Zaporizhia Refractories (Ukraine)

=== Sales ===
Metinvest Group is present in all major markets around the world, including Europe, the Middle East and Africa, North, Central and South America, and Asia.

- Metinvest-Eurasia was Metinvest Group's distribution channel in Russia. The company ceased operations in April 2022.
- Metinvest-SMC, LLC (Ukraine) is a network of steel service centres selling Metinvest products in Ukraine. The company started operating in 2003. By 2022, there were 18 steel centres in Ukraine.

=== Logistics ===
- Metinvest Shipping (Ukraine)

=== Service and engineering ===
- Metinvest-Promservice (Ukraine)
- Metinvest Engineering (Ukraine)
- Mariupol Machining and Repair Plant (Ukraine)
- Kryvyi Rih Machining and Repair Plant (Ukraine)
- Metinvest Digital (Ukraine)

*On 15 March 2017, Metinvest Group announced the total loss of control over the operations of these assets.

== Company market position ==
In 2021, Metinvest topped Forbes ranking of Ukraine's largest private companies.

It is Ukraine's largest producer of iron ore and steel. In 2021, the World Steel Association ranked the group 42nd among the top 50 steel companies in the world.

Steelmaking capacity is 15 million tonnes per year. In 2021, Metinvest was ranked among the world's top 10 iron ore producers.

The group's facilities are located near major transport hubs and seaports, which gives additional advantages in supplying products to customers in Ukraine and elsewhere in the world.

== Key operational data ==
Products (000 metric tonnes)	2009	2010	2011	2012	2013	2014	2015	2016	2017	2018	2019	2020	2021
Hot metal*	6,123	11,850	12,385	11,010	11,500	9,213	8,050	8,821	7,941	8,205	7,928	8,475	9,709
Crude steel*	7,027	13,835	14,375	12,459	12,391	9,205	7,669	8,393	7,361	7,323	7,578	8,268	9,533
Semi-finished products**	2,730	3,018	3,574	2,731	2,304	1,688	2,581	2,229	2,746	3,026	3,160	3,313	3,411
Pig iron	-	-	600	585	814	1,132	1,181	1,197	1,403	1,644	1,264	1,088	1,347
Slabs	1,675	2,195	2,460	1,329	1,516	999	802	734	1,343	1,382	1,896	2,225	1,651
Square billets	1,055	823	514	817	788	689	598	298	15	N/A	N/A	N/A	N/A
Finished products	4,098	4,902	9,317	8,601	9,021	6,767	5,644	6,485	5,606	5,769	5,595	5,859	7,233
Flat products	1,612	2,472	6,407	5,809	5,840	4,625	4,010	4,385	4,675	4,747	4,677	4,835	5,978
Long products	1,760	2,213	2,618	2,448	2,592	1,765	1,475	1,918	714	817	714	794	1,089
Railway products	203	217	292	344	274	81	31	73	67	65	49	79	48
Tubular products	523	317	678	435	315	296	128	109	150	140	155	151	118
Iron ore concentrate	30,648	17,878	12,577	36,224	36,926	34,888	32,208	29,640	27,464	27,353	29,028	30,501	31,341
Coking coal concentrate	4,734	3,907	3,560	2,064	5,513	4,098	3,285	3,051	2,461	2,683	2,961	2,883	5,542

*For comparability of production numbers, hot metal and crude steel output at Ilyich Steel in 2010 was accounted for the entire year. The total volume of semi-finished products excludes those re-rolled at the group's plants. These volumes are eliminated as intercompany sales for purposes of Metinvest's consolidated results.

== Carbon footprint ==
Metinvest reported Total CO2e emissions (Direct + Indirect) for 31 December 2019 at 8,461 Kt (-956 /-10.2% y-o-y). There have been no significant reductions in emissions in recent years.

Metinvest's Total CO2e emissions (Direct + Indirect) (in kilotonnes)
Dec 2017	Dec 2018	Dec 2019
8,408	9,417	8,461

== Environment ==
In 2020, three Metinvest enterprises Ilyich Steel, Azovstal and Pokrovske Coal were among the top ten environmental polluters in Ukraine.

Metinvest was the first Ukrainian member of the World Steel Association, which demands that its members comply with the principles of environmentally responsible business.

To reduce the environmental impact in Mariupol, Metinvest decommissioned the open-hearth furnace production at Azovstal in 2011 and at Ilyich Steel in 2015. In 2012, three obsolete coke batteries at Azovstal were also decommissioned and the sinter plant was mothballed. In 2020, Metinvest completed the reconstruction of the sinter plant gas treatment facilities at Ilyich Steel at a cost of over $160 million. The new treatment system was designed to reduce dust emissions by 90% and sulphur oxide emissions by 43%.

In 2015, Zaporizhstal completed construction of a new hydrochloric acid pickling line with a pickling liquor regeneration unit. The cost of the project was about $77 million. After the launch of the line, the plant completely stopped discharging used pickling solutions into the Dnipro River.

In 2019, Azovstal reconstructed the aspiration system in the foundry yard and under-bunker rooms of blast furnace No. 3. The cost of the project was over $14 million. Air emissions were reduced by 88% and met European environmental standards.

In 2017, Northern GOK replaced the gas cleaning equipment of the Lurgi 552-B roasting machine. The project, costing about $14 million, made it possible to achieve emission concentrations of up to 50 mg per cubic metre, which meets Ukrainian environmental standards.

In 2011–2020, Metinvest allocated $3.5 billion to projects with an environmental component and $1 billion to purely environmental projects. In 2021 the group stated its intention to invest another $0.5 billion in environmental projects over the next five years.

In 2011–2020, environmental investments enabled the group to reduce emissions of pollutants by 37%, including a 51% reduction in dust emissions and a 45% reduction in emissions to water bodies.

== Structures built with Metinvest’s steel ==
=== Bridges ===
==== The "Eyes" of Beersheba (Beersheba, Israel) ====
The weight of the bridge is 750 tonnes, including 600 tonnes of Metinvest steelwork.

==== New Darnytskyi Bridge (Kyiv, Ukraine) ====
During construction, 13,600 tonnes of steel structures were used, of which 5,500 tonnes were made by Metinvest.

==== Glass Bridge (Kyiv, Ukraine) ====
The construction used 700 tonnes of steel produced by Metinvest.

==== San Giorgio Bridge (Genoa, Italy) ====
A total of 18,500 tonnes of steel produced by Metinvest were used in the construction of the bridge.

=== Buildings ===
==== The Shard (London, UK) ====
A total of 5,000 tonnes of steel produced by Metinvest was used in the construction.

==== Hudson Yards — The Shed (New York, US) ====
The development used 8,200 tonnes of steel produced by Metinvest.

==== Chornobyl New Safe Confinement (Prypyat, Ukraine) ====
The construction used 13,300 tonnes of steel produced by Metinvest.

==== Olimpiyskiy National Sports Complex (Kyiv, Ukraine) ====
The complex used 7,500 tonnes of steel structures produced by Metinvest.

=== Ships ===
==== Flying Clipper vessel (Croatia) ====
The construction of the clipper used 3,000 tonnes of Metinvest's steel.

==== Panama Canal gates (Panama) ====
The construction used 9,000 tonnes of steel produced by Metinvest.

== See also ==
- List of steel producers
