= Kryvyi Rih =

City in Ukraine

Kryvyi Rih Кривий Ріг
- City
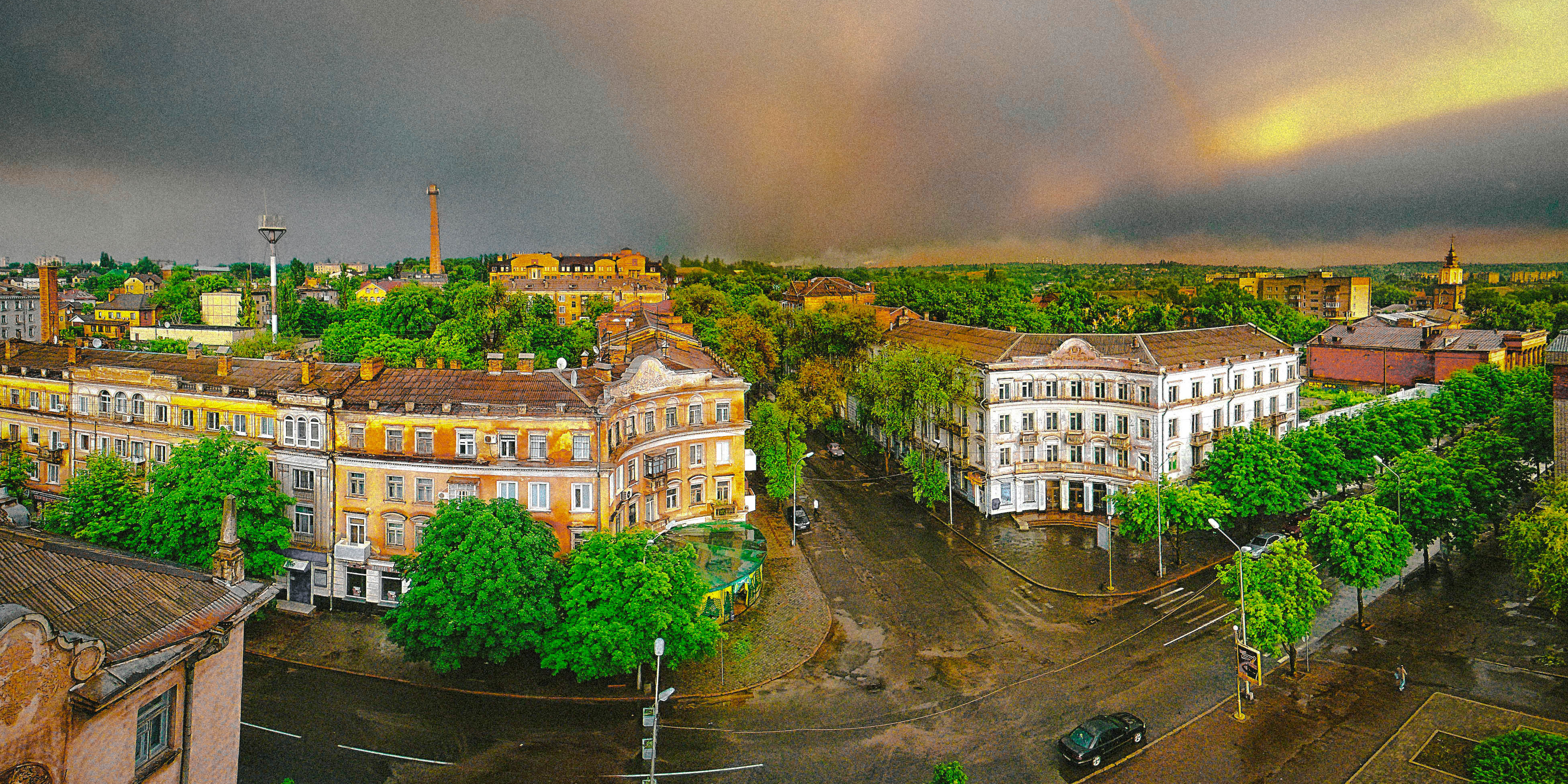
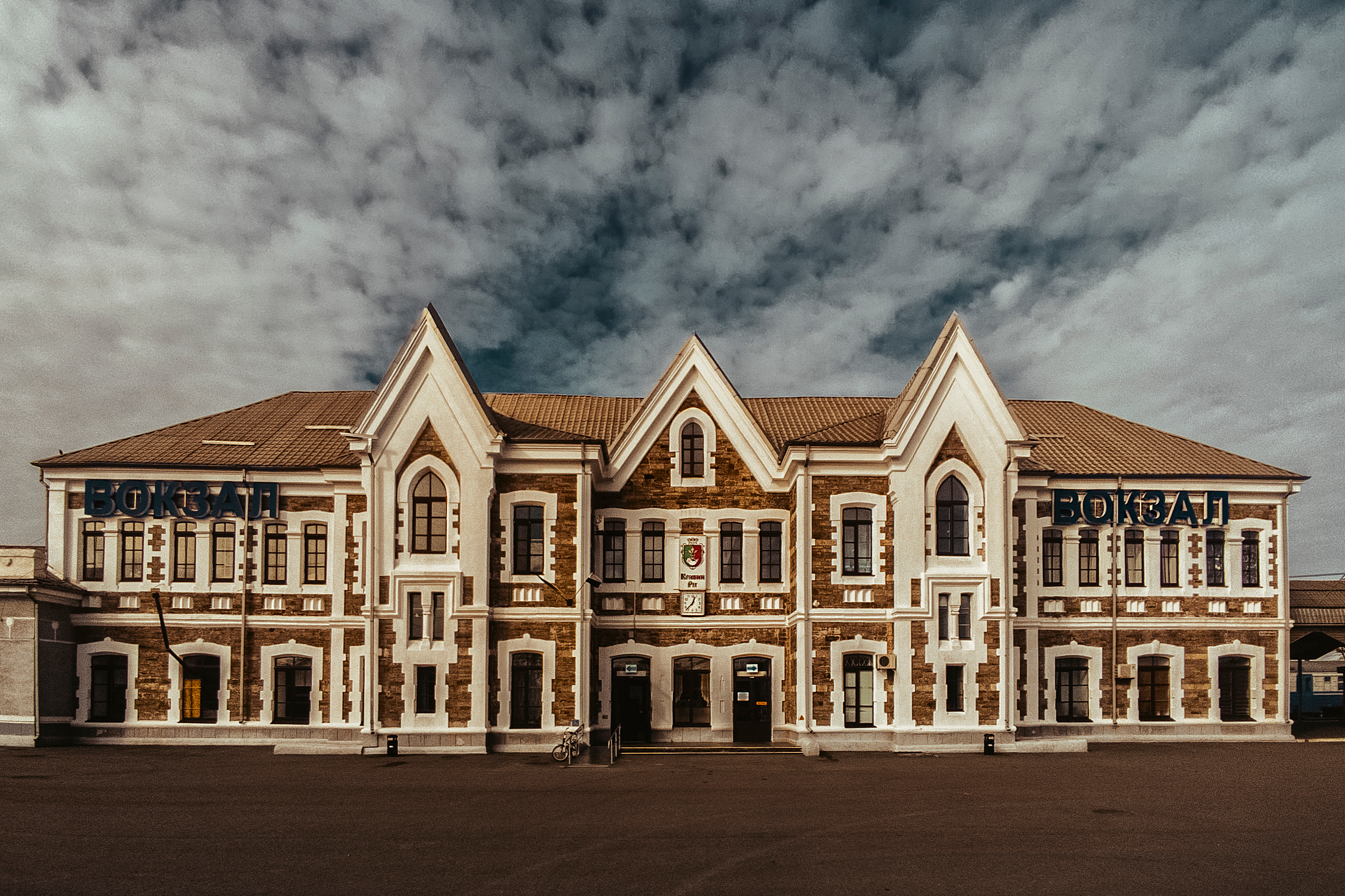
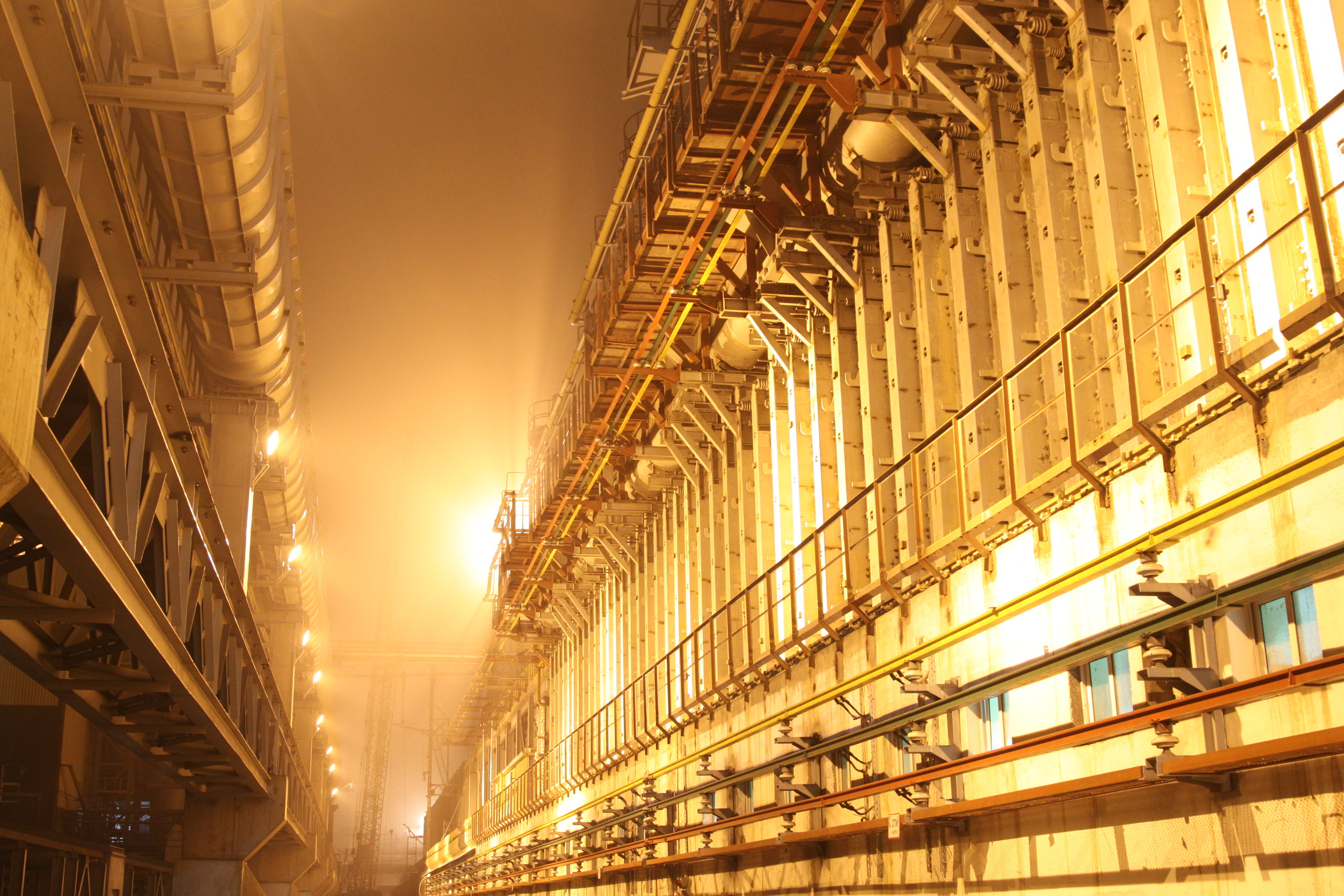
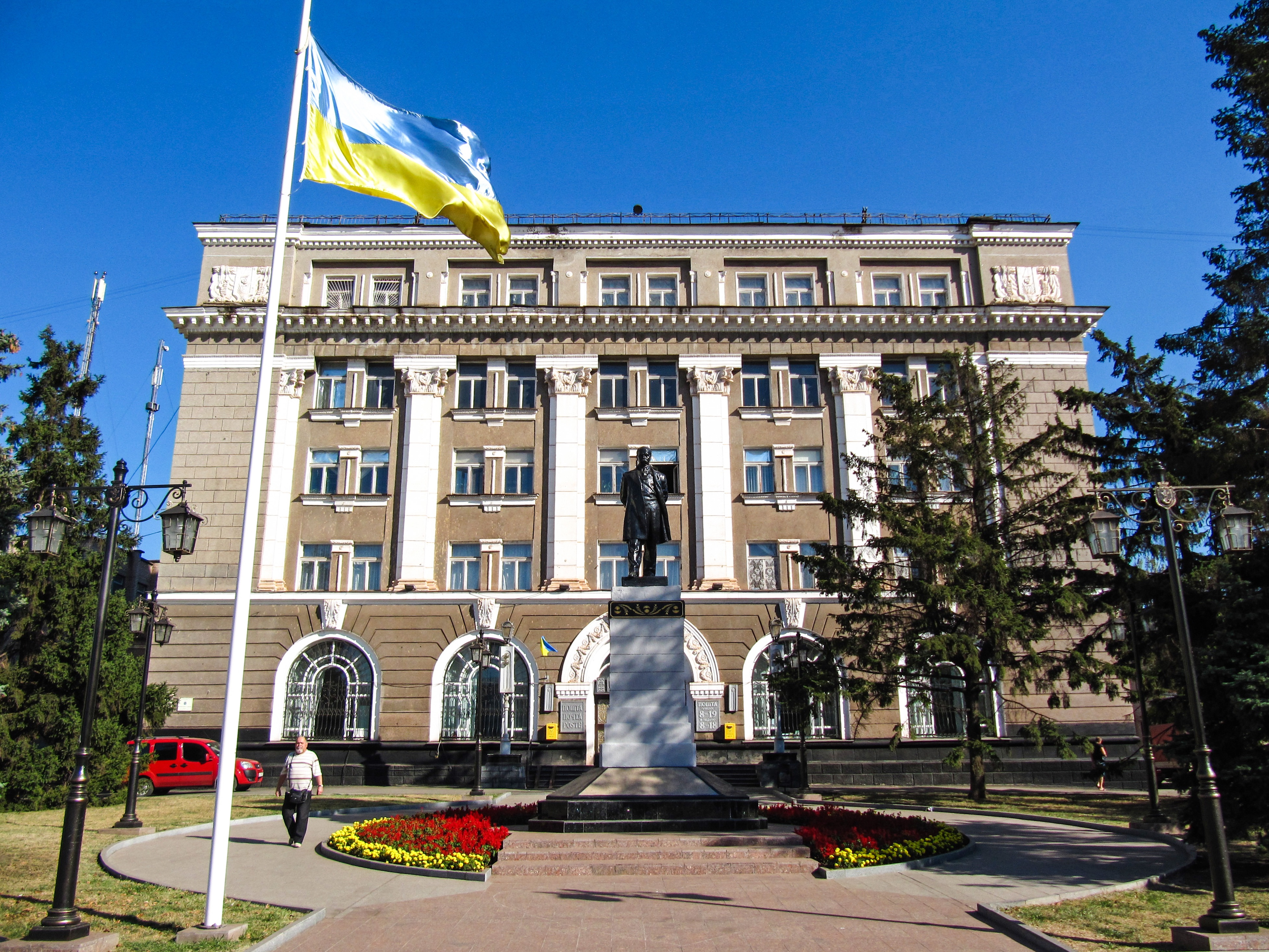
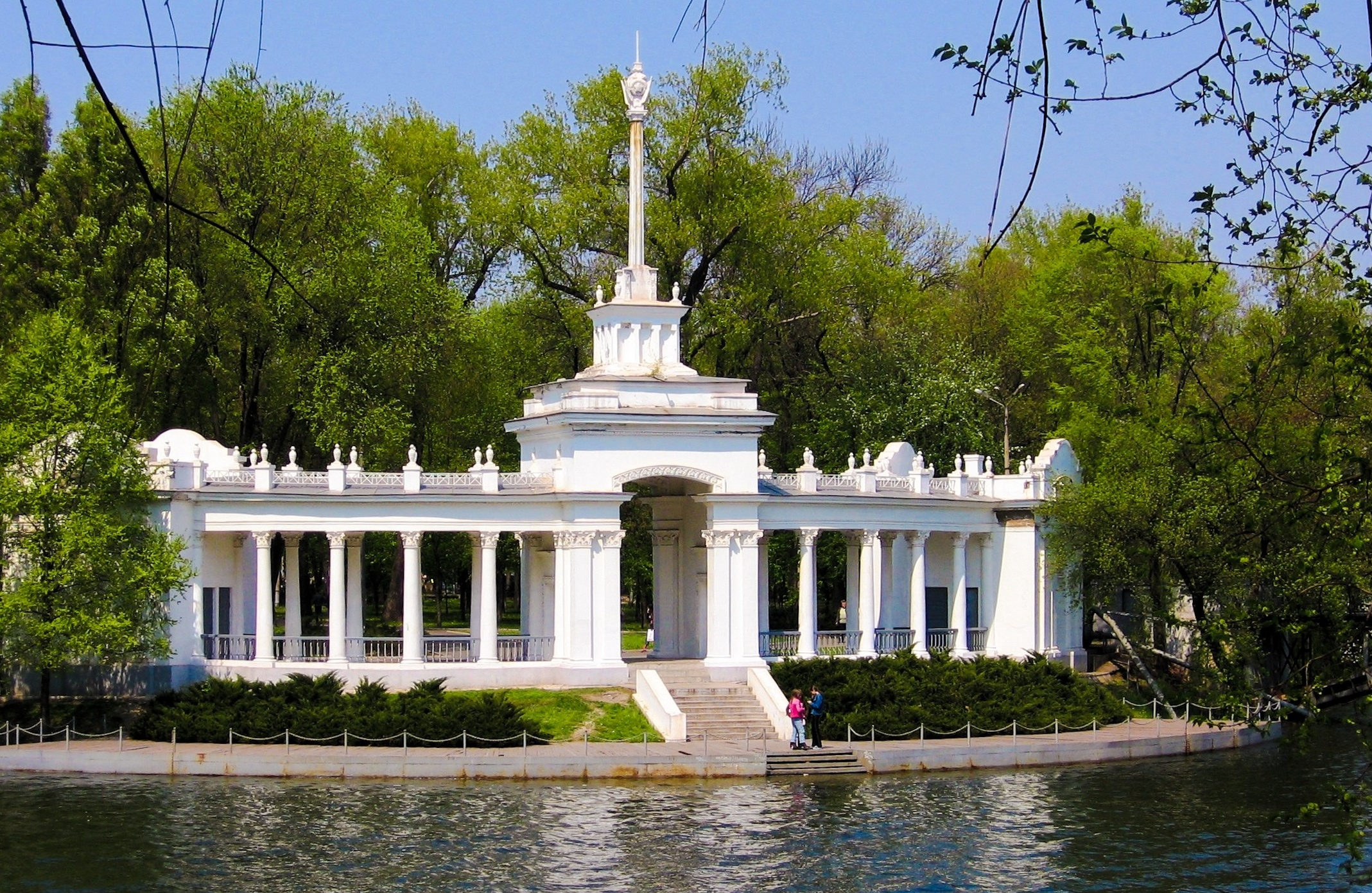
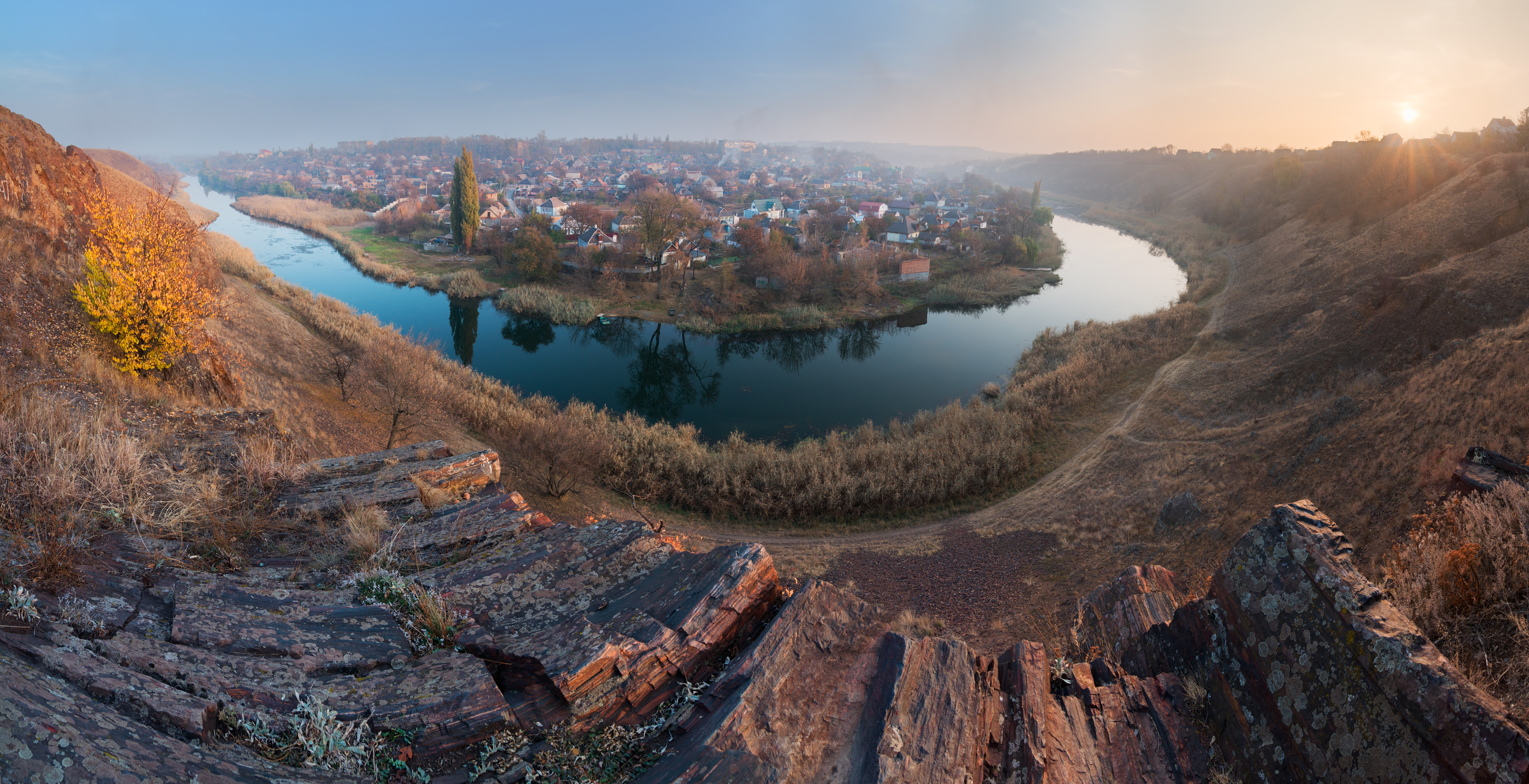
- Historical centre Main train station ArcelorMittal steel mill Main post office Boat station on the Saksahan Landscape of the Inhulets from the Eagle's Nest Rocks

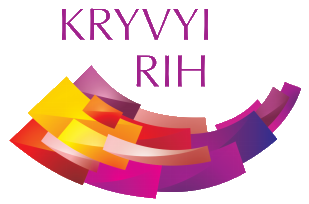
- Flag Coat of arms Brandmark
- Motto: Life-long city
- Anthem: Anthem of Kryvyi Rih
- Interactive map of Kryvyi Rih
- Location of Kryvyi Rih in Ukraine Location of Kryvyi Rih in Dnipropetrovsk Oblast
- Coordinates: 47°55′N 33°23′E
- Country: Ukraine
- Oblast: Dnipropetrovsk Oblast
- Raion: Kryvyi Rih Raion
- Hromada: Kryvyi Rih urban hromada
- Founded: 1775 (251 years ago)
- Town charter: 1860
- City status: 1919
- Administrative HQ: Kryvyi Rih City Hall, Ploshcha (Square) Molodizhna
- Raions: List of 7 districts: 1. Ternivskyi District; 2. Pokrovskyi District; 3. Saksahanskyi District; 4. Tsentralno-Miskyi District; 5. Dovhyntsivskyi District; 6. Metalurhiinyi District; 7. Inhuletskyi District

Government
  - Type: City council, regional
  - Mayor: City council secretary Yuri Vilkul (Mayor Kostiantyn Pavlov died on 15 August 2021, since then his powers are temporarily exercised by the city council secretary)
  - Governing body: Kryvyi Rih City Council

Area
  - City: 431 km^{2} (166 sq mi)
  - Rank: 2nd, UA
- Elevation: 84 m (276 ft)

Population (2022)
  - City: 603,904
  - Rank: 8th, UA
  - Density: 1,400/km^{2} (3,630/sq mi)
  - Metro: 1,170,953
- (2019)
- Time zone: UTC+2 (EET)
  - Summer (DST): UTC+3 (EEST)
- Postal code: 50000-50479
- Area code: +380 56(4)
- Website: krmisto.gov.ua

Kryvyi Rih (Note: /ˈkrɪvi ˈriː/ KRIV-ee REE; Ukrainian: Кривий Ріг, IPA: [krɪˈwɪj r⁽ʲ⁾iɦ]; Russian: Кривой Рог, romanized: Krivoy Rog [krʲɪˈvoj ˈrok], locally: [krʲɪˈwɔi̯ rɔx]) is a city in central Ukraine. It hosts the administration of Kryvyi Rih Raion and its subordinate Kryvyi Rih urban hromada in Dnipropetrovsk Oblast. The city is part of the Kryvyi Rih Metropolitan Region. Its population is estimated at 603,904 (2022 estimate), making it the seventh-most populous city in Ukraine and the second largest by area. Kryvyi Rih is claimed to be the longest city in Europe.

Located at the confluence of the Saksahan and Inhulets rivers, Kryvyi Rih was founded as a military staging post in 1775. Urban-industrial growth followed Belgian, French and British investment in the exploitation of the area's rich iron-ore deposits, generally called Kryvbas, in the 1880s. Kryvyi Rih gained city status in 1919.

Stalin-era industrialisation built Kryvorizhstal in 1934, the largest integrated metallurgical works in the Soviet Union. After World War II, Kryvyi Rih experienced renewed growth through to the 1970s. The economic dislocation associated with the break-up of the Soviet Union contributed to high unemployment and a large-scale exodus from the city in the 1990s. The privatization of Kryvorizhstal in 2005 was followed by increased foreign and private investment which helped finance urban regeneration. Beginning in 2017, there were major labour protests and strikes.

Since the beginning of the Russian invasion of Ukraine in February 2022, Kryvyi Rih has been the target of frequent Russian missile strikes. It was a focus of the southern Ukraine campaign, but the closest ground advance by Russia stalled some 50 kilometres (31 mi) to the south of the city before it was turned back in March 2022.

== Etymology ==
Ukrainian transcriptions

- National, BGN/PCGN: Kryvyi Rih
- ALA-LC: Kryvyĭ Rih
- Scholarly: Kryvyj Rih

Kryvyi Rih (Кривий Ріг), which in Ukrainian literally means 'crooked horn' or 'curved cape', was the name originally given in the 18th century to the general area of the present city by Zaporozhian Cossacks. According to local legend, the first village in the area was founded by a "crooked" (Ukrainian slang for 'one-eyed') Cossack named Rih (literally, 'horn'). The name likely derives from the shape of the landmass formed by the confluence of the river Saksahan with the Inhulets.

When governed from St Petersburg under the Tsars (1775-1917), the settlement was identified in Russian as Кривой Рог (Krivoy Rog).

== History ==
=== Early history ===
In 1734 the Cossack Zaporozhian Sich (or Host) incorporated the area within the Inhul Palanka division of their de-facto republic. A list of villages and winter camps (zymivnyky) from that time mentions Kryvyi Rih. In 1770, Kryvyi Rih was again recorded as the camp of the Zaporozhian Sich.

In May 1775, after the end of the Russian-Turkish War, Russian authorities established Kryvyi Rih as a staging post, in the tradition of the Mongol yam, on the roads to the Russian garrisons of Kremenchuk, Kinburn foreland and Ochakov. In August 1775, on the direct order of Catherine the Great, the Sich was forcibly dissolved. The Cossack lands were annexed to the Russian province of Novorossiya and distributed among the Russian and Ukrainian gentry.

The early 19th century saw the construction of the first stone houses (1828), and three water mills. In 1860, the village was designated a township.

=== Industrial growth ===
Alexander Pol is credited with discovering the Kryvyi Rih Iron Ore Basin (Kryvbas). This stimulated the development of a local mining industry. In 1884, Alexander III started the Catherine Railway Kryvyi Rih and the Kryvbas mines to Dnipro. By 1902, the line had extended a further 505 km to the coal-mining region of Donbas.

In 1880, with 5 million francs of capital, Pol founded the "French Society of Kryvyi Rih Ores". In 1882 16.4 thousand tons of ore were extracted from open-cast operations on the outskirts of town by 150 workers. The first underground mine of the basin began operations in 1886. In 1892, the Hdantsivka ironworks was started. Ore began to be processed locally, spawning new metallurgical enterprises spurred by substantial western, and in particular Belgian, investment. At the same time Kryvyi Rih ore began to feed the German metallurgical industry in Silesia.

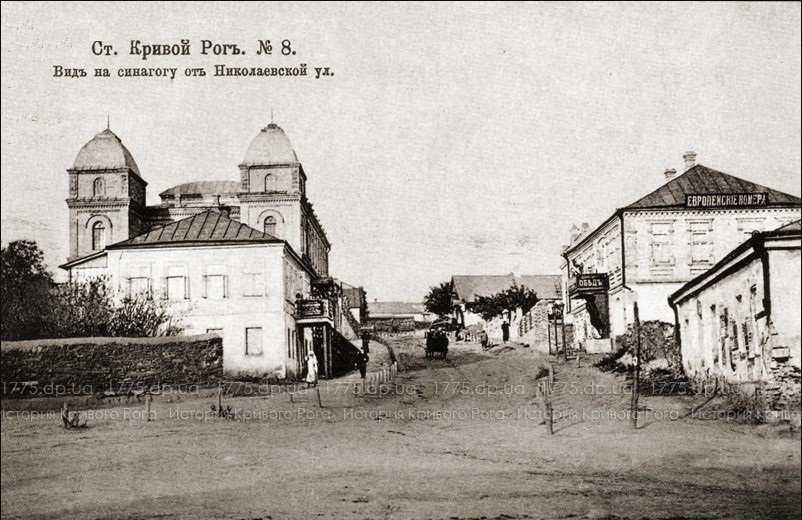
Kryvyi Rih's synagogue, 19th century

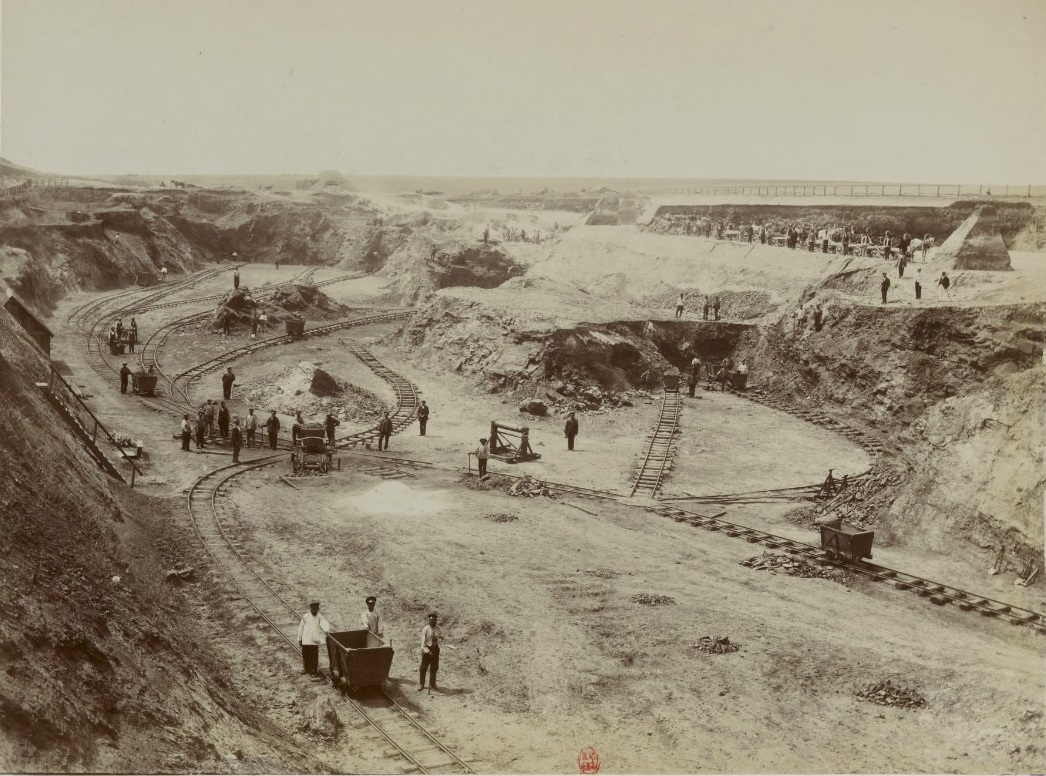
An ore quarry in 1899

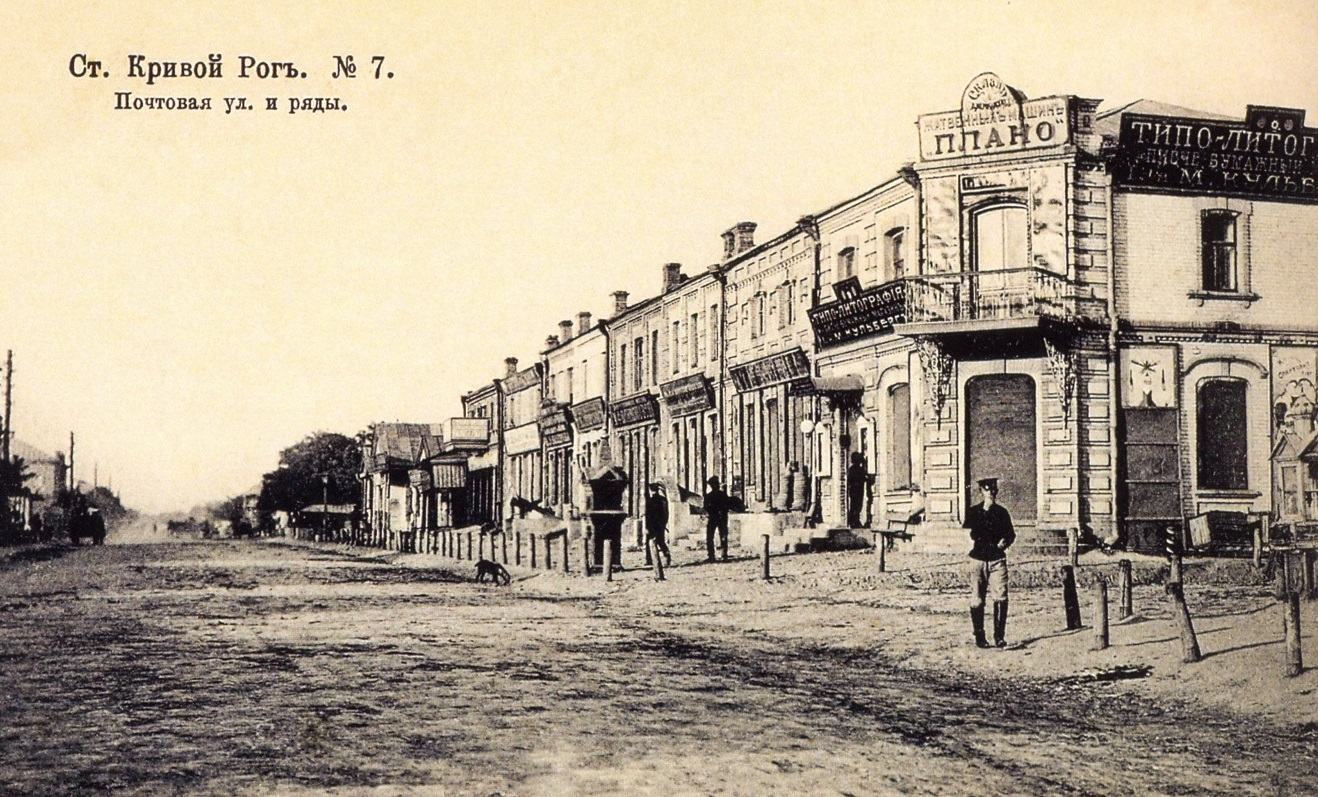
Poshtova Street about 1900

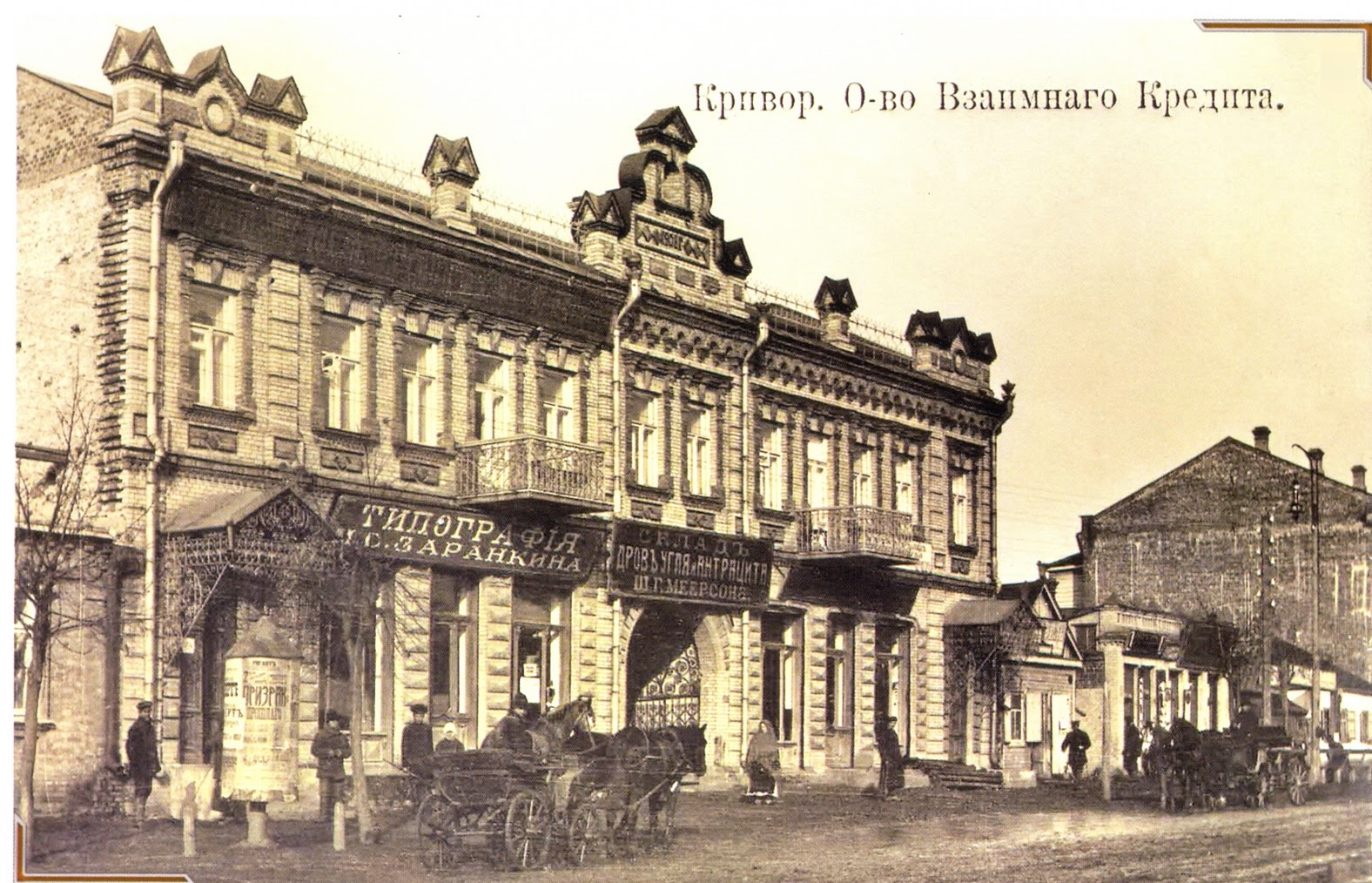
Kryvyi Rih Mutual Credit Society

At the end of the 19th century the tallest building was the Central Synagogue, built by a thriving Jewish community of artisans, merchants and traders. In 1905, the community was subject to pogroms, in which the authorities were complicit. Many Jewish people left the area, emigrating to Germany, Austria-Hungary and the United States.

The surrounding mines attracted prospectors looking to turn a quick profit. The supply of mined ore soon exceeded demand. Many mines had to cut employment or temporarily suspend operations. Workers, many drawn from the Russian-speaking north (from Great Russia), laboured in harsh conditions with no security. Work in the mines induced lung cancer, tuberculosis and asthma. In protest, workers began to develop ideas about socialism and democracy. Labour unrest resulted in several terrorist attacks and in widespread strikes.

The First World War interrupted access to the export markets, and many workers were drafted into the military.

=== Ukrainian War of Independence ===
In the Ukrainian War of Independence, Kryvyi Rih changed hands several times.

A council of soviet of Soldiers and Worker's Deputies was formed in 1917. January 1918 saw the first attempt by the Bolsheviks to establish the authority in the town of the new Soviet government in Moscow. In February 1918, the Bolsheviks proclaimed the Donetsk-Krivoy Rog Soviet Republic, but then in March conceded the territory under the terms of the Treaty of Brest-Litovsk to the German-controlled Ukrainian State.

After the Germans and their Austro-Hungarian allies withdrew in November 1918, the town was successively occupied by the Ukrainian People's Republic, the counter-revolutionary Volunteer Army of General Denikin (the "Whites"), the anarchist Revolutionary Insurgent Army of Ukraine (the Makhnovshchina) and, from 17 January 1920, by the Bolshevik Red Army.

Afterwards it was administratively part of the Katerynoslav Governorate of Ukraine. In 1922 the region was incorporated into the Ukrainian SSR, a constituent republic of the Soviet Union.

=== Soviet era ===
==== Industrialisation and collectivisation ====
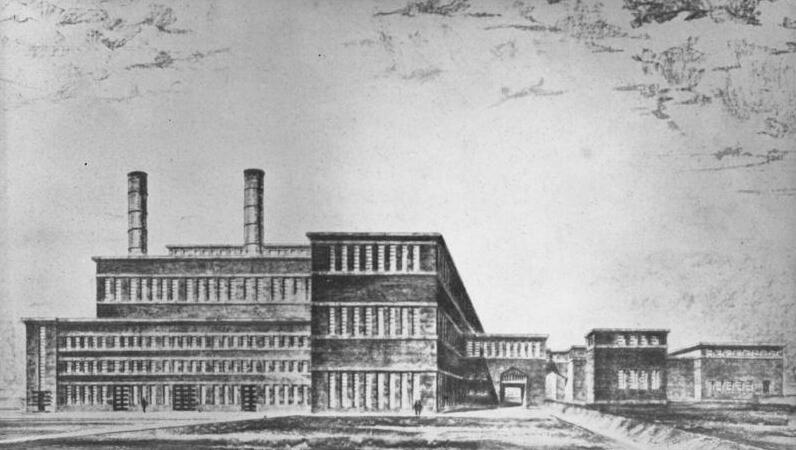
AEG power station built in 1930

The town, with a population of 22,571, was now designated a city. Mine operations were revived, and in 1924 a 55.3 km (34.4 mi) water-supply system was laid underground. In the summer of 1927, 10,000 people began to work on the Dnieprostroi, a huge dam on the Dnieper River in Zaporizhzhia, whose hydro-electric power drove Kryvyi Rih's industrialisation. The first Mining Institute opened in 1929. The Medical and Pedagogical Institutes were founded.

In line with Stalin's plans for break-neck industrialisation, in 1931 the foundation of the Kryvyi Rih Metallurgical Plant, the future Kryvorizhstal, was laid. The first blast furnace of the metallurgical works produced steel three years later. The city grew rapidly. In the surrounding countryside, industrialisation was accompanied by the collectivisation of agriculture. The dispossession of the peasants and the confiscation of their harvests induced the Holodomor or Great Famine of 1932–33.

By 1941, at over 200,000, the population of the industrial city had increased almost tenfold.

==== German occupation ====
During World War II, Kryvyi Rih was occupied by the German Army from 15 August 1941 to 22 February 1944. It was administered for most of that period as part of the Reichskommissariat Ukraine. In advance of the Germans, industrial plant and machine operators were evacuated to Nizhny Tagil in the Urals. An initial toleration of Ukrainian cultural activity and propaganda by the pro-German Organization of Ukrainian Nationalists in the city ended in January and February 1942 with the arrest and execution of the leading Ukrainian activists.

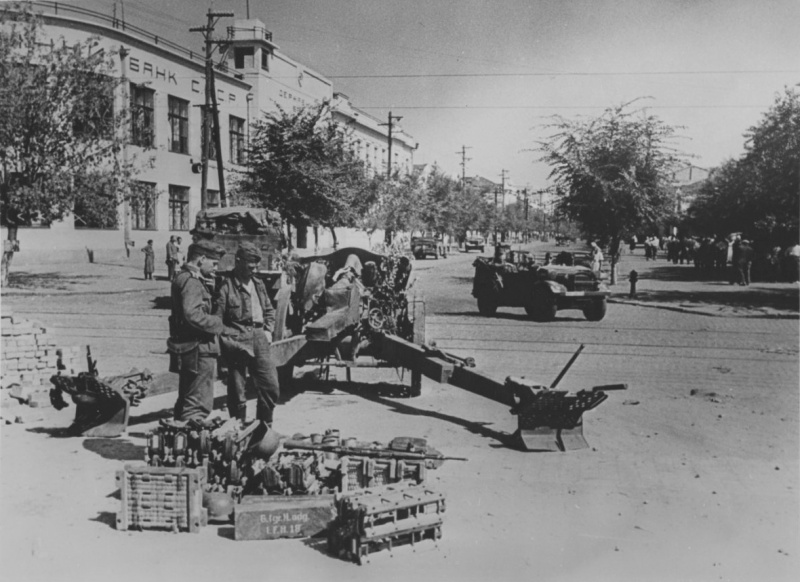
Wehrmacht soldiers operating 10.5 cm leFH 18. Svobody Street, 1942

In 1939, 12,745 Jews had lived in Kryvyi Rih, comprising about 6% of the total population. Those who did not leave the city during the organized evacuation were systematically concentrated and murdered by the Nazi occupiers during the Holocaust. The first mass killing of two to three hundred by an Einsatzkommando occurred at the end of August 1941 at a brick works. On 14–15 October a combination of SS, German police and Ukrainian auxiliaries murdered 7,000 more at an iron ore mine. Children were thrown into the pits alive.

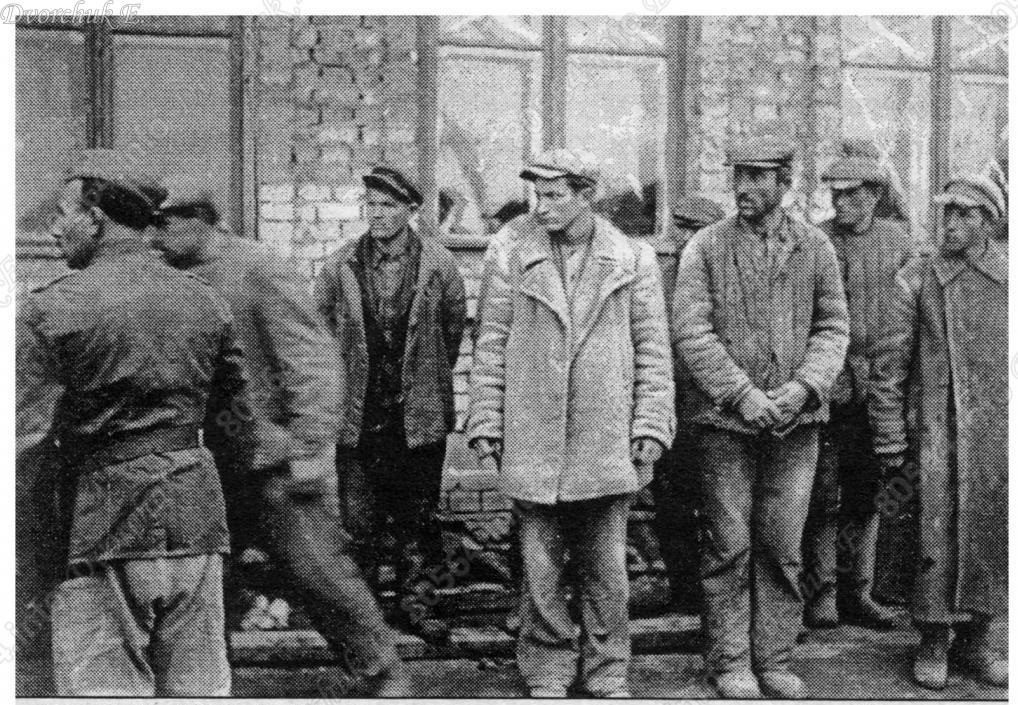
Soldiers arresting people, 1942

During World War II, the Stalag 338 prisoner-of-war camp was relocated from Kietrz to Kryvyi Rih. The number of POWs ranged from 5,219 in May 1942 to 23,977 in September 1942, and at least 800 POWs died in the camp. In November 1943, the camp was moved to Voznesensk.

Hitler had repeatedly stressed the crucial importance of this area: "The Nikopol manganese is of such importance, it cannot be expressed in words. Loss of Nikopol (on the Dnieper River, today's southwest of Zaporizhzhia) would mean the end of war." The German bridgehead on the left bank of the Dnieper gave the German command a base in order to restore the land connection with their forces locked in the Crimea. During the first half of January 1944, Soviet troops made repeated attempts to eliminate the Nikopol-Krivoy Rog enemy group. The Nikopol–Krivoy Rog Offensive did not succeed in breaking into the city until the end of February. Although the greater part of city was destroyed, a special 37th Red Army detachment prevented the German demolition of the power stations in the city and the Saksahan dams.

==== Post-war ====
After the war, people lived among the ruins while rebuilding the housing stock. The housing shortage was met by innovative technological solutions, and temporary barracks and houses were quickly built.

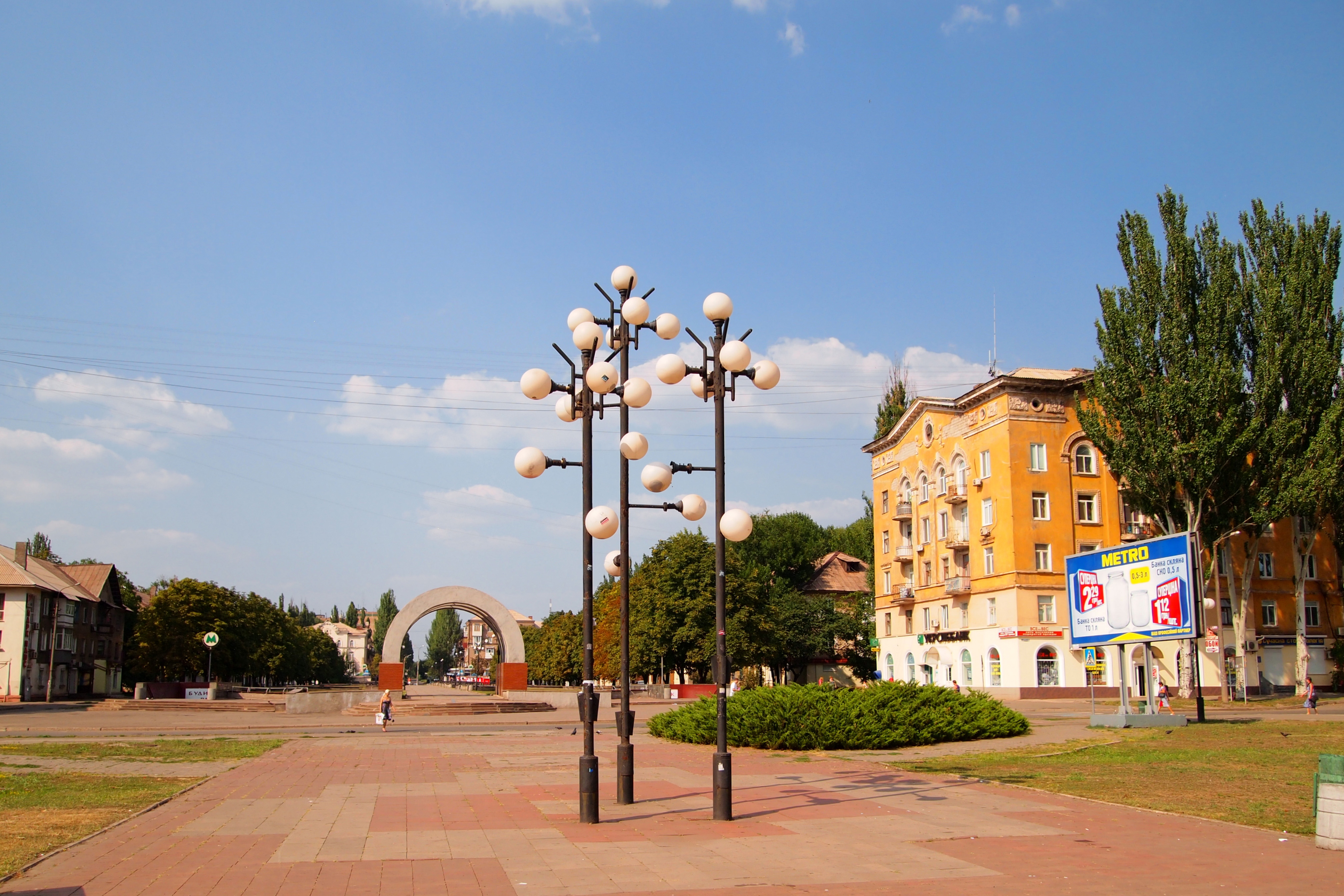
Dimitrova Street, like many in the city center, is lined with dozens of Stalinist buildings

In the late 1940s, re-construction was accompanied by Stakhanovite propaganda: Pre-war iron ore production was restored by 1950. In 1961 this was supplemented by new mines and by the Central and, Northern Iron Ore Enrichment Works. By the end of the Soviet era, Kryvbas was producing 42% of the USSR's and 80% of Ukrainian ore.

At the beginning of the 1960s, the city received a signature 185m-tall, guyed tubular steel TV mast. Housing stock was replaced and expanded with several large Khrushchyovkas apartment complexes. Urban planning incorporated broad tree-lined avenues with trams lines running down their center.

On June 16–18, 1963, increased food prices triggered protests in the city, estimated to involve between 1,000 and 6,000 people. After an ex-serviceman who had interacted with the police was severely beaten, there was rioting. Moscow sent in troops. While the authorities admitted to 4 dead and 15 wounded, witnesses report that soldiers killed at least 7, and that over 200 people were hospitalised with injuries. Fifteen hundred people received prison sentences.

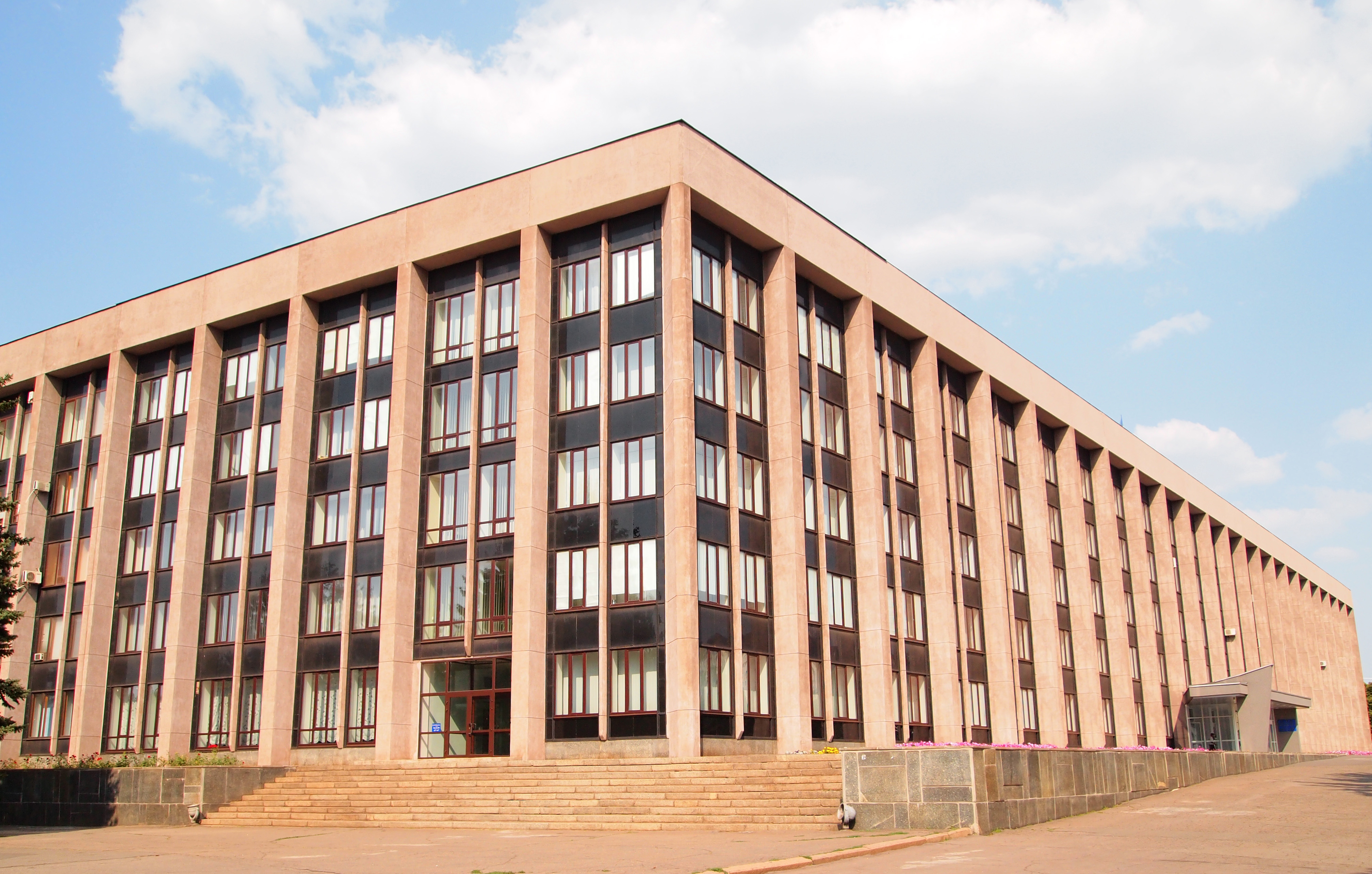
City Hall was built in the year of the city's 200th jubilee.

In 1975, the city's two-hundredth anniversary was marked by the development of the Jubilee mine and adjacent residential area, and by the construction of a new city administration building and park. In September 1976, the Krivorozh wool spinning factory was commissioned.

In last years of the Soviet Union, and following a sharp reduction in spending on cultural, sports and youth service, the city witnessed neighbourhood-based gang violence—the so-called "war of Runners". The era of Perestroika was also marked by the emergence of independent trade unions, and of new civic and political organisations.

The former Krivoi Rog Air Base is located nearby.

=== In independent Ukraine ===
==== Redevelopment and politics ====
In a national referendum on 1 December 1991, Ukrainian independence was approved by 90% of the votes cast in Kryvyi Rih's Dnipropetrovsk Oblast. The first 25 years of independence was a period of economic dislocation and adjustment. The population of the city decreased by almost 100,000, from a peak of 780,000 in the late 1980s.

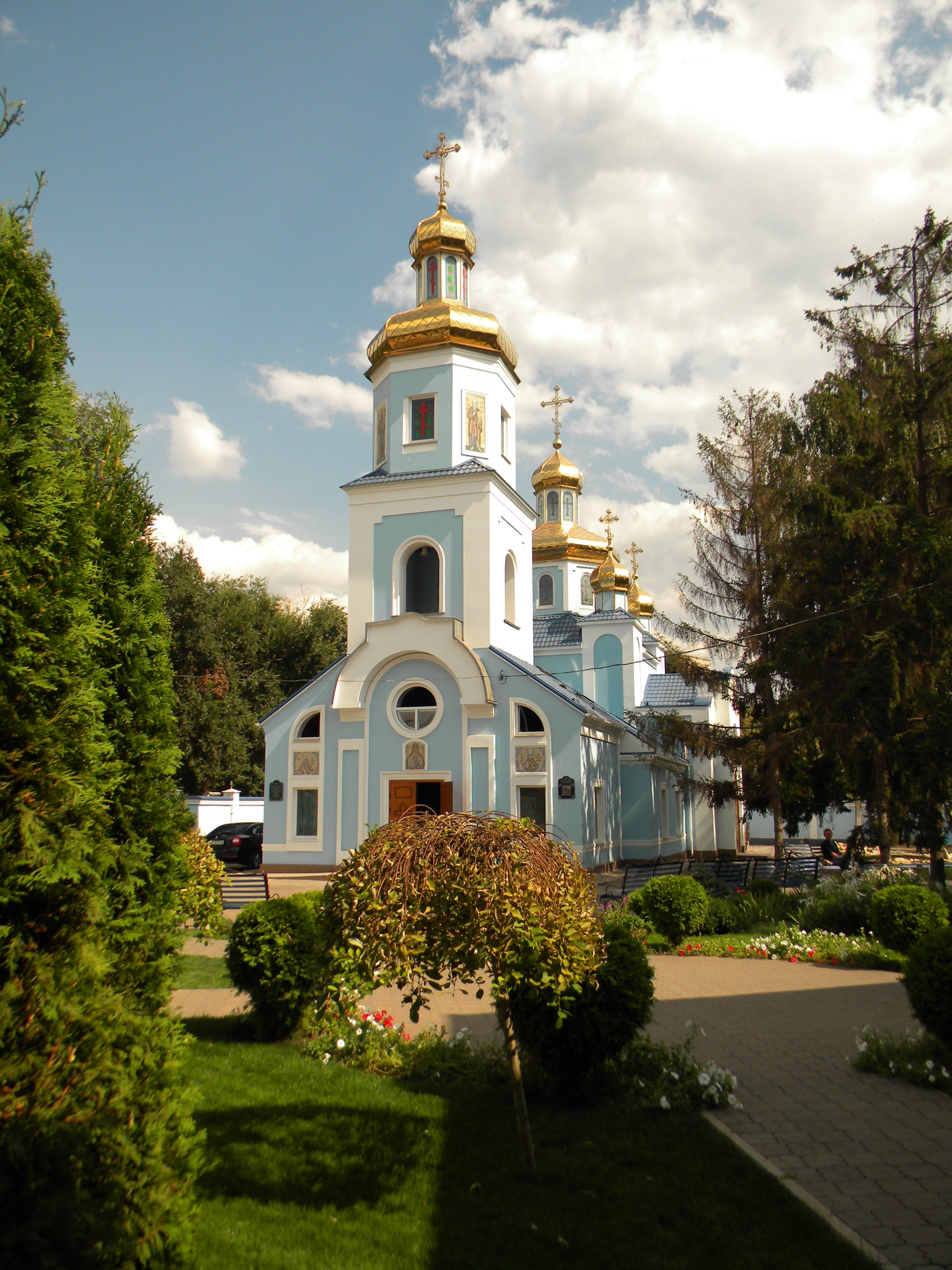
Nativity of the Theotokos Church, 1886, restored in the 2000s

Assisted by Metinvest, investment followed the 2005 privatization of Kryvorizhstal. There was extensive redevelopment including new shopping and entertainment centers. In July 2020 as part of the administrative reform of Ukraine, Kryvyi Rih Municipality and the Kryvyi Rih Raion came under a common city authority. The city remains the second most important in the Dnipropetrovsk region after Dnipro. Krivyi Rih has two independent universities, and several institutes and technical schools.

Until the events of Euromaidan in 2014 and their aftermath, in local and national elections Kryvyi Rih favored Russian-friendly candidates belonging first, in the 1990s, to the Communist Party of Ukraine and then, in the new century, the Party of Regions. In 2010 the city elected Party of Regions Yuriy Vilkul mayor, and helped Viktor Yanukovych to victory in the presidential election. After the Euromaidan events, which were accompanied by demonstrations and clashes in the city centre, support began to ebb from the Party of Regions. Petro Poroshenko, who insisted that Russian separatists in the Donbas "don't represent anybody", was supported in the presidential election of 2014. Vilkul was re-elected mayor in 2015, but amidst large-scale protests alleging electoral fraud.

In the 2019 Ukrainian presidential election the city supported its native son Volodymyr Zelenskyy, who defeated Poroshenko in the second round in April. In the July 2019 elections for the Ukrainian Rada, candidates for Zelenskyy's Servant of the People Party won the city's three parliamentary seats. However, in December 2020, the Servant of the People candidate for mayor, Dmytr Shevchuk, lost to Kostantin Pavlov of the pro-Russian Opposition Platform — For Life.

On 15 August 2021, Pavlov was found dead in the entrance to his home, a gun lying next to his body. In September, reporting on an investigation that included a search of the home of the former, and now acting, mayor, Yyriy Vilkul, the Minister of Internal Affairs Denys Monastyrsky suggested that Pavlov may have committed suicide against the backdrop of a large-scale audit of the city's budget.

==== Labour protests ====
Beginning in 2017, Kryvyi Rih had major labour unrest. In May 2017, coordinated protest actions began at the city's main plants, Kryvyi Rih Iron Ore Plant, Evraz-Sukha Balka and AMKR. Employees stopped work, held public meetings and occupied administration offices. Noting that they were receiving one of the lowest wages across the global industry, the metalworkers raised the demand for a monthly wage of US$1,000/Euros. The conflict stopped after an agreement was reached to gradually raise wages, on average by 50%. In 2018, protest erupted again triggered by the fatal result of underinvestment in plant and safety. On the night of 3–4 March 2018, the roof collapsed at AMKR's converter shop, killing a 25-year-old worker.

In May 2018, the ArcelorMittal steel plant ground to a halt as workers refused to guide trains along the factory's self-enclosed supply chain until they received monthly pay of 1,000 euros. Management brought in employees from state-owned railway company Ukrzaliznytsia to run the factory, breaking the strike but leaving the central dispute in place. An underlying problem, according to ArcelorMittal's chief procurement officer, was a labour shortage. Skilled workers were emigrating to Poland, Czechia, and to other countries. But the plant's upper management saw costs associated with the higher salaries that might retain workers as an unacceptable threat to an ambitious, multibillion-dollar factory modernization project.

Kryvorizhstal, Ukraine's largest integrated steel company, had been privatised in 2005 in a publicly televised auction. This was after the incoming government of President Viktor Yushchenko cancelled a 2004 auction that had seen the company sold at a much lower price, to a consortium that included the son-in-law of ex-President Leonid Kuchma. The Indian-owned international steel conglomerate Mittal Steel proved successful with a bid of $4.8 billion, equivalent to a fifth of Ukraine's national budget. In 2006, Mittal took over its international rival, Arcelor, to form ArcelorMittal headquartered in Luxembourg City. Over the next five years, the company said it invested more than $5 billion in its Kryvyi Rih operations.

On 15 October 2020, in an action that began with 393 miners occupying mine-shafts, 18 iron-ore miners came to the surface after spending a total of 43 days underground to protest pay and conditions. The mine administration had introduced piecework wages for most jobs underground, linking people's daily income to the amount of ore mined. In response to this, and to above-ground worker blockades, plant management made concessions on wages, benefits and health and safety.

==== Russian invasion ====
On the first day of the invasion of Ukraine by Russia, 24 February 2022, there were air strikes against military targets in the city, causing evacuations of residents in the district of Makulan.

On 27 February, city mayor Oleksandr Vilkul was appointed the head of the military administration of Kryvyi Rih. According to Vilkul, the day previously — the second day the war — the Russian military had attempted an air assault. An Ilyushin Il 76 transport had approached an abandoned Soviet-era air base just east of the city. Carrying more than 100 paratroopers with orders to capture the airfield as an “air bridge”, it was forced to abort its mission, 300 metres from landing. Local defenders had blocked the runway with mechanical equipment. The following day, according to Vilkul, a Russian column of 300 military vehicles approaching from the south was turned back after ten days of fighting. As an industrial center that accounted for fully 10% of Ukraine's GDP, Vilkul was convinced that Kryvyi Rih was a prime target for Russian forces.

In the third week of the war, Russian troops broadened their offensive across Ukraine and were again advancing toward Kryvyi Rih from the south. On 10 March, two rockets struck the Kryvyi Rih International Airport in Lozovatka. On 12 March, Metinvest shuttered an open pit iron ore mine in the city, and sent the huge trucks used at the mine to block key roads to slow the Russian advance. In its 15 March briefing, the Ukrainian Ministry of Defence stated that the movement by "occupation troops" toward Kryvyi Rih had been stopped.

According to Russian sources, the invaders faced extensive improvised fortifications and minefields. On 29 March 2022, Vilkul said that the line of contact was no longer on the border with Dnipropetrovsk region, but 40–60 km south in the Kherson Oblast. He was confident that running 120 km north to south, the longest city in Europe could not be surrounded.

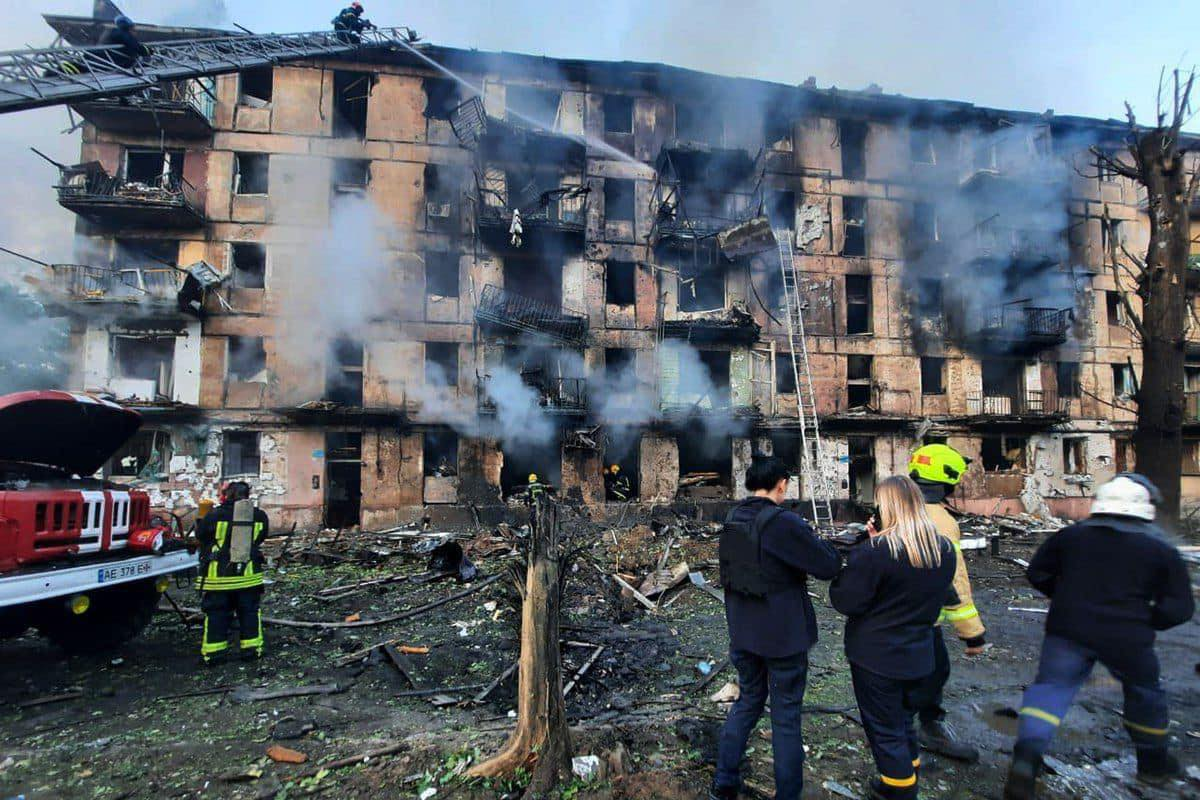
A residential building in Kryvyi Rih after a Russian rocket attack on the night of 13 June 2023

On 30 March, ArcelorMittal which at the beginning of the month had idled its steelmaking operations in Kryvyi Rih citing concern for the safety and security of its 26,000 workers and for its assets, announced that it was preparing to restart production.

At the end of May 2022, responding to Russian rocket and missile strikes, Ukrainian forces made limited counterattacks south of Kryvyi Rih. The southern Inhulets and Radushne districts remain exposed to Russian shelling with civilian losses. At dawn on 25 August, Kryvyi Rih was hit by cluster munitions.

On 14 September 2022, Russian missiles struck the dam of the Karachun reservoir, located upstream of Kryvyi Rih along the Inhulets, causing rising water levels in the Inhulets and water shortage in the city. The strike against President Zelenskyy's home town—an attempt, he suggested, to flood the city—came after his visit to towns in the Kharkiv region regained in Ukraine's first major counteroffensive.

In 2025, the third year of the war, the city has been subjected to large-scale kamikaze drone strikes. On 4 April, a Iskander-M ballistic missile strike hit a residential area, including a playground killing 20 people, including 9 children. It was the deadliest single strike involving children since the beginning of the full scale invasion. In 2026, repeated missile strikes halted primary steel production at ArcelorMittal.

== Government ==
The City of Kryvyi Rih and 7 districts
1. Ternivskyi District; 2. Pokrovskyi District; 3. Saksahanskyi District; 4. Tsentralno-Miskyi District; 5. Dovhyntsivskyi District; 6. Metalurhiinyi District; 7. Inhuletskyi District

The city of Kryvyi Rih is governed by the Kryvyi Rih Municipality. It is a city community that is designated as a separate district within its oblast.

Administratively, the city is divided into districts (raions). There are 7 districts: Metalurhiinyi, Tsentralno-Miskyi, Ternivskyi, Saksahanskyi, Inhuletskyi, Pokrovskyi and Dovhyntsivskyi. Small townships, Avanhard, Horniatske, Ternuvatyi Kut, Kolomiitseve and Novoivanivka were added to the city.

In 1775, the Inhulets Povit (territory) of Novorossiysk Governorate was established on lands of the Inhulets palanca, after the abolition of the Zaporozhian Sich. In 1775/1776 it was part of Kherson Governorate. In 1783, the povit centre became Kryvyi Rih, and it was renamed "Kryvyi Rih Povit". In 1860, Kryvyi Rih received the status of township within the Kherson Governorate. In 1919, the township was granted city status in Yekaterinoslav Governorate and, later, Dnipropetrovsk Oblast. As a result of the administrative reform in 1923, Kryvyi Rih povit converted to Kryvyi Rih county. In 1930, it became an independent administrative unit of Ukraine.

Kryvyi Rih has four single-mandate parliamentary constituencies entirely within the city, through which members of parliament (MPs) are elected to represent the city in Ukraine's national parliament. At the 2014 Ukrainian parliamentary election, they were won by Petro Poroshenko Bloc and independent candidates with representation being from Yuri Pavlov, Andriy Halchenko, Konstantin Usov respectively.

In multimember districts, the city voted for the Opposition Bloc, a union of all political forces that did not endorse Euromaidan. In the 2019 Ukrainian parliamentary election the party of Ukrainian President and Kryvyi Rih native Volodymyr Zelenskyy, Servant of the People, took three of the city's seats. The fourth was taken by Dmytro Shpenov, previously of the Opposition Bloc, standing as an independent.

== Culture ==
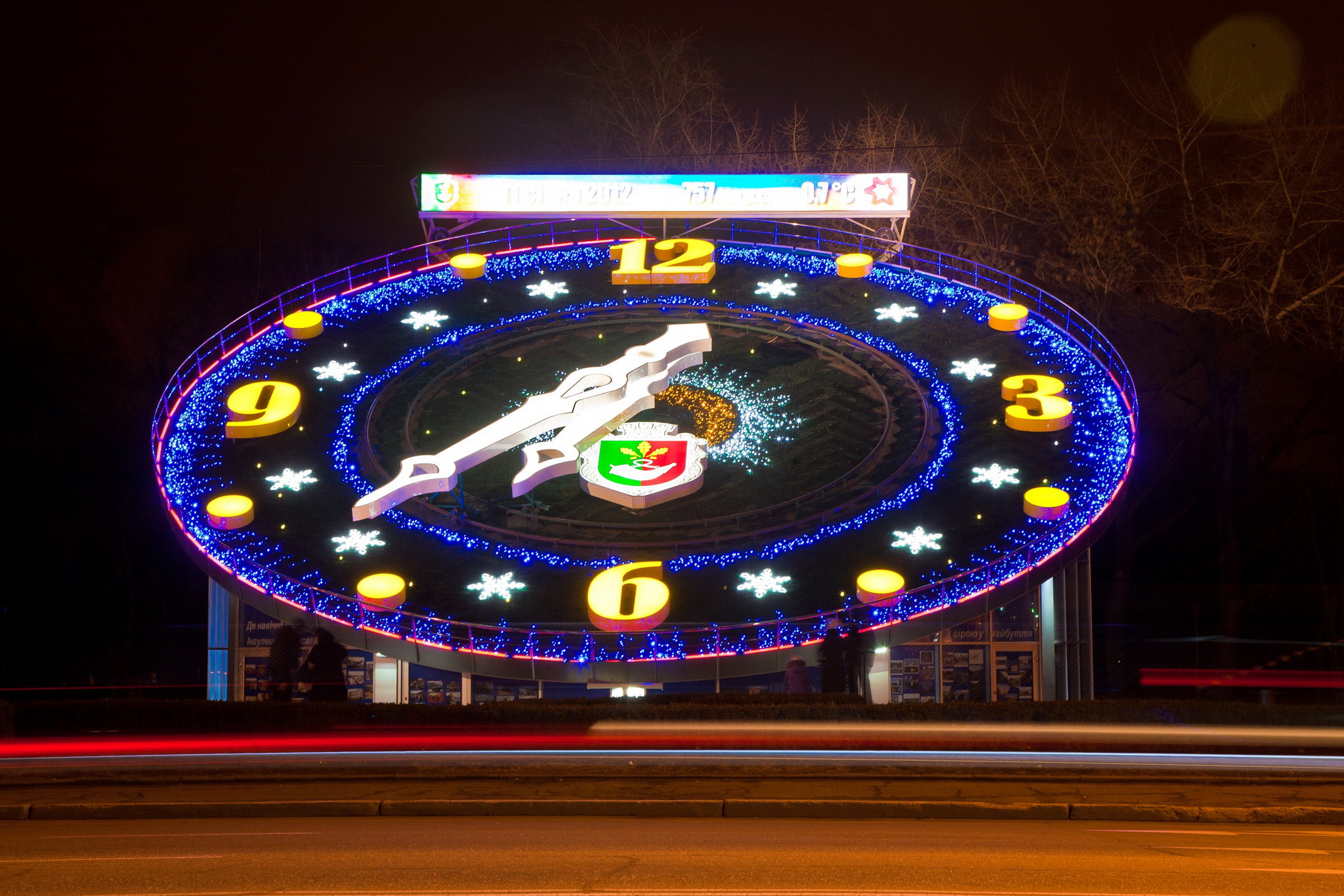
Local history museum with one of the biggest flower clocks in Europe

Kryvyi Rih has a thriving theatre, circus and dance scene, and is home to a number of large performance venues. There are also the Doll Theatre and Movement Theatre. The first theater was the Coliseum, built in 1908. The New Theatre of Vyzenberh and Hrushevskyy followed in 1911, at the corner of Lenina and Kalynychenko streets. Kryvbas Theatre began its activities in 1931, and three years later was incorporated with the Shevchenko Theater.

Kryvyi Rih is noted as the birthplace Eugenie Gershoy. She emigrated to the United States with her family in 1903, and there became an American sculptor and watercolorist. Gershoy's work is in the collections of the Whitney Museum of American Art, the Metropolitan Museum of Art, and the Smithsonian American Art Museum. Her papers are held at Syracuse University. Indie band Brunettes Shoot Blondes, folk musician Eduard Drach, actress Helena Makowska, and dancer Vladimir Malakhov originated from the city.

The first film screenings were conducted in the city in the early 1920s. In 1934 Lenin Cinema was built. Today there are three movie theaters: Olympus, Odessa and Multiplex. The Kryvyi Rih Circus features large-scale exhibition space where fairs are held. A remnant of Soviet heritage are Palaces of Culture, located in every district of the city.

The local historical museum celebrates Cossack history, the industrial heritage of the area and its role in the Soviet State. The municipally owned Art Gallery houses a collection of local paintings.

The nightlife of the city has expanded significantly since the 2000s. Big clubs such as Hollywood and Sky have attracted touring DJs and pop and rap performers. Another major scene of the city is the Palace of Youth and Students of the Kryvyi Rih National University (KNU). The most popular fast-food, McDonald's, is located at Kvartal 95 neighborhood.

Ukrainian cuisine is found adjacent to a range of Jewish and popular American foods: bagels, cheesecake, hot dogs, shawarma and pizza. Japanese cuisine and other Asian restaurants, hookahs, sandwich joints, trattorias and coffeehouses have become ubiquitous. Other well-known places include City Pub and Prado Cafe. The city is home to the annual electronic music Turbofly festival. Rock music, a tradition in Ukraine, is an important part of the city's life and is hosted in few small pubs.

== Landmarks ==
Kryvyi Rih's buildings display a variety of architectural styles, ranging from eclecticism to contemporary architecture. The widespread use of red brick and block apartments characterize the city. Much of the architecture in the city was built during its prosperous days as a center for the ore trade. Just outside the immediate city center is a large number of former factories. Some have been totally destroyed. Others are in desperate need of restoration.

Stalinist architecture was the predominant style of postwar apartments, of 5 to 7 stories. City Hall is the best example of The decree On liquidation of excesses. Khrushchyovka are a type of low-cost, concrete-paneled or brick three- to five-storied apartment building which was developed in the USSR during the early 1960s. They are named after Nikita Khrushchev, then premier of the Soviet government. Dozens of these aging buildings around the city are now past their design lifetime.

Kryvyi Rih has six microdistricts.

The city has many Christian churches, the most notable being the Savior Transfiguration Cathedral of the Ukrainian Orthodox church in union with the Russian Orthodox Church. It is the base of the Kryvyi Rih Eparchy, which was established in July 1996. A Roman Catholic chapel located in the old town, Pokrova church, Mykhailivska church and Christmas church were destroyed in the 1930s during the Great Purge, never to be used as a church again. Beside the Russian jurisdiction, in 2009 to 2011 there existed parallel eparchy of the Orthodox Church of Ukraine (as the Ukrainian Orthodox Church – Kyivan Patriarchate). Domination of the pro-Russian political party Party of Regions in Kryvyi Rih expelled that organization.

In 2010, the Jewish community built a new, large synagogue.

Large parks hold many of Kryvyi Rih's public monuments. There are numerous socialist realism-style monuments installed in the Soviet years to honor Cossacks, Olexander Paul, Taras Shevchenko (2), Bohdan Khmelnytsky (3, since 1954), Vasili Marguelov, Alexander Pushkin, Fyodor Sergeyev, Mikhail Lermontov, and Maxim Gorky. The few Lenin monuments were destroyed during euromaidan events in 2014. Dozens of cenotaphs and memorials to Second World War soldiers were erected. A Sukhoi Su-15 is on display near the Aviator Club, a Yakovlev Yak-40 at the National Aviation University, Vyzvolennia Square holds a IS3 tank, and a Russian locomotive class Ye is placed near the railway station.

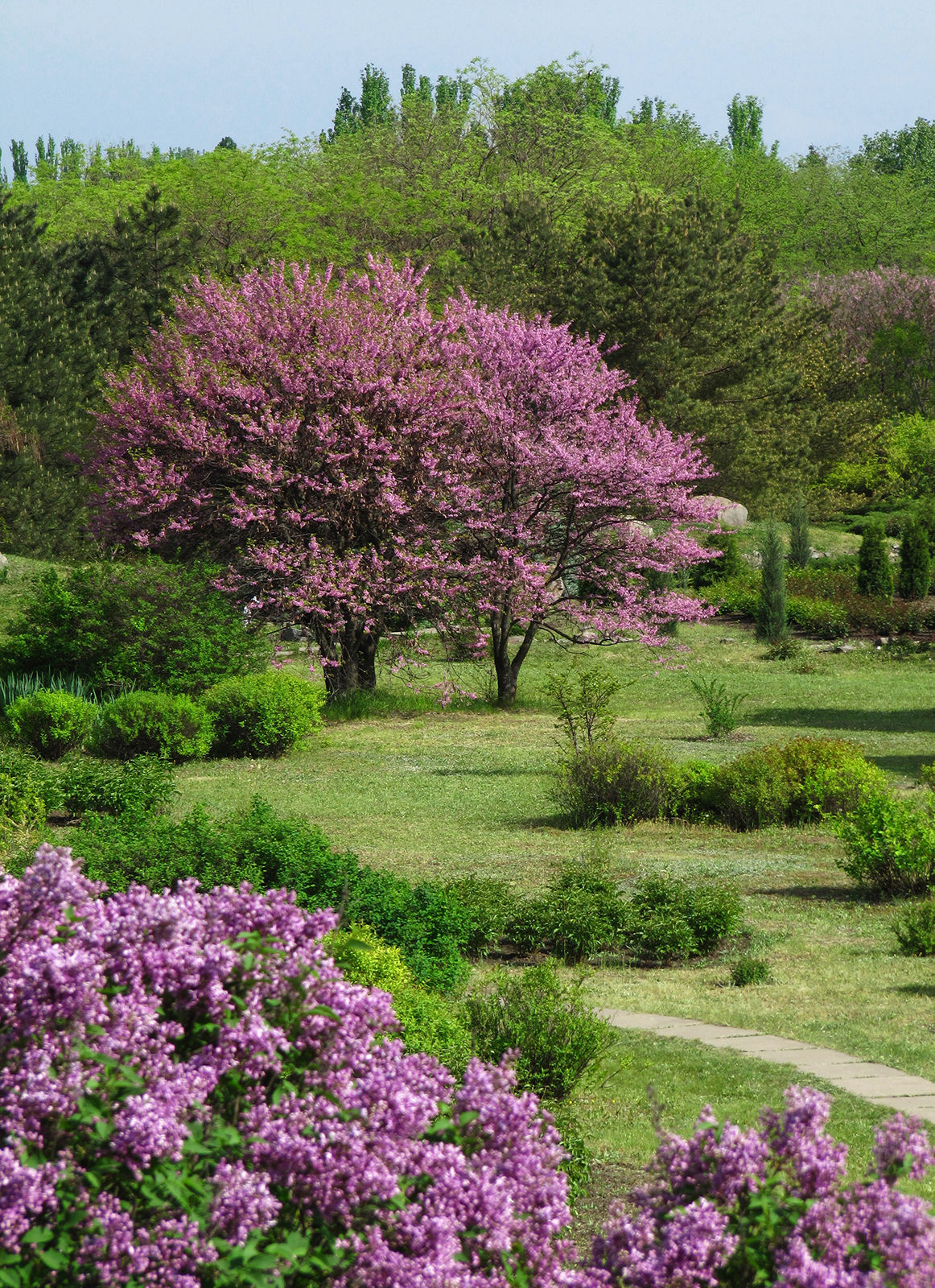
Kryvyi Rih Botanical Gardens of NAS

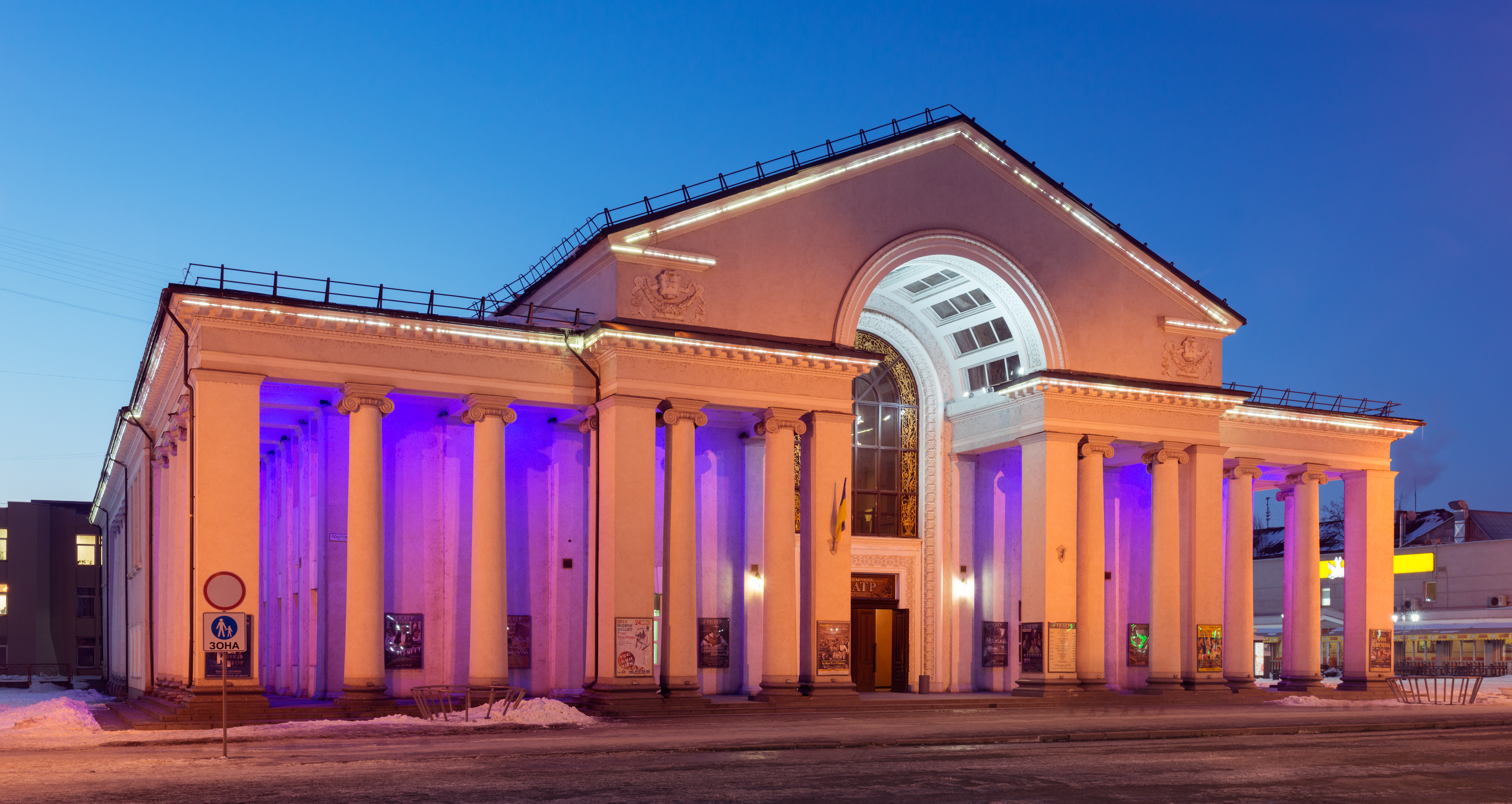
Shevchenko Theatre

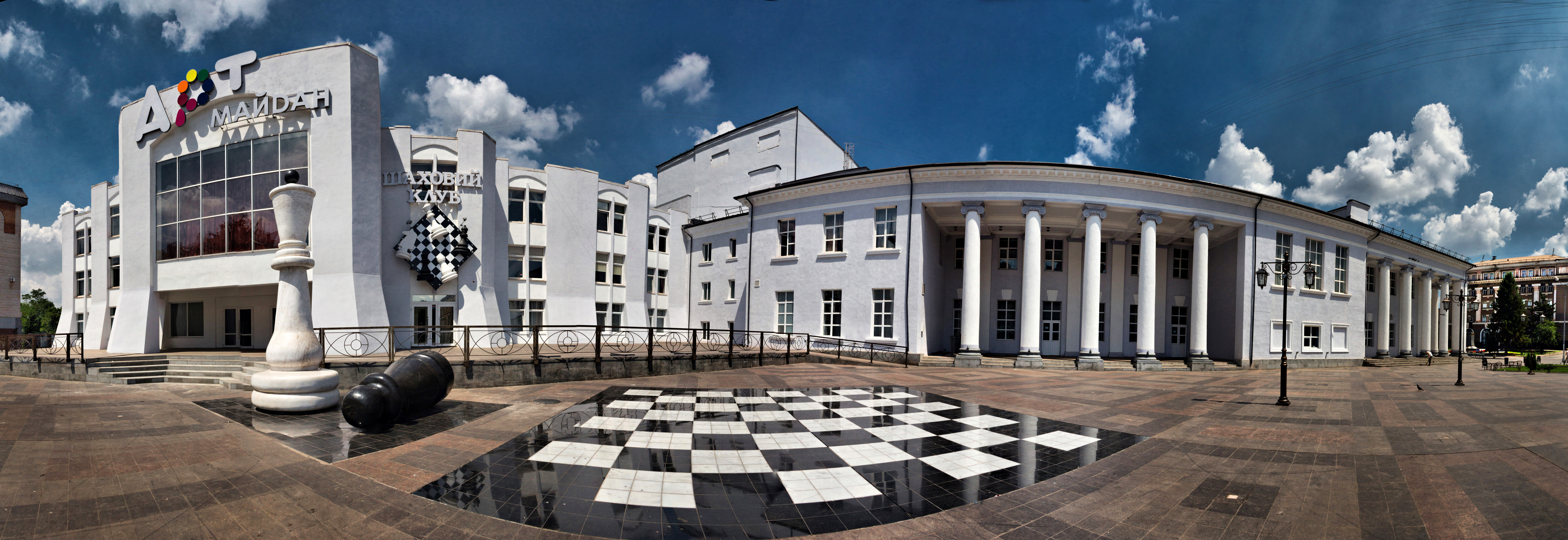
Central Art Square

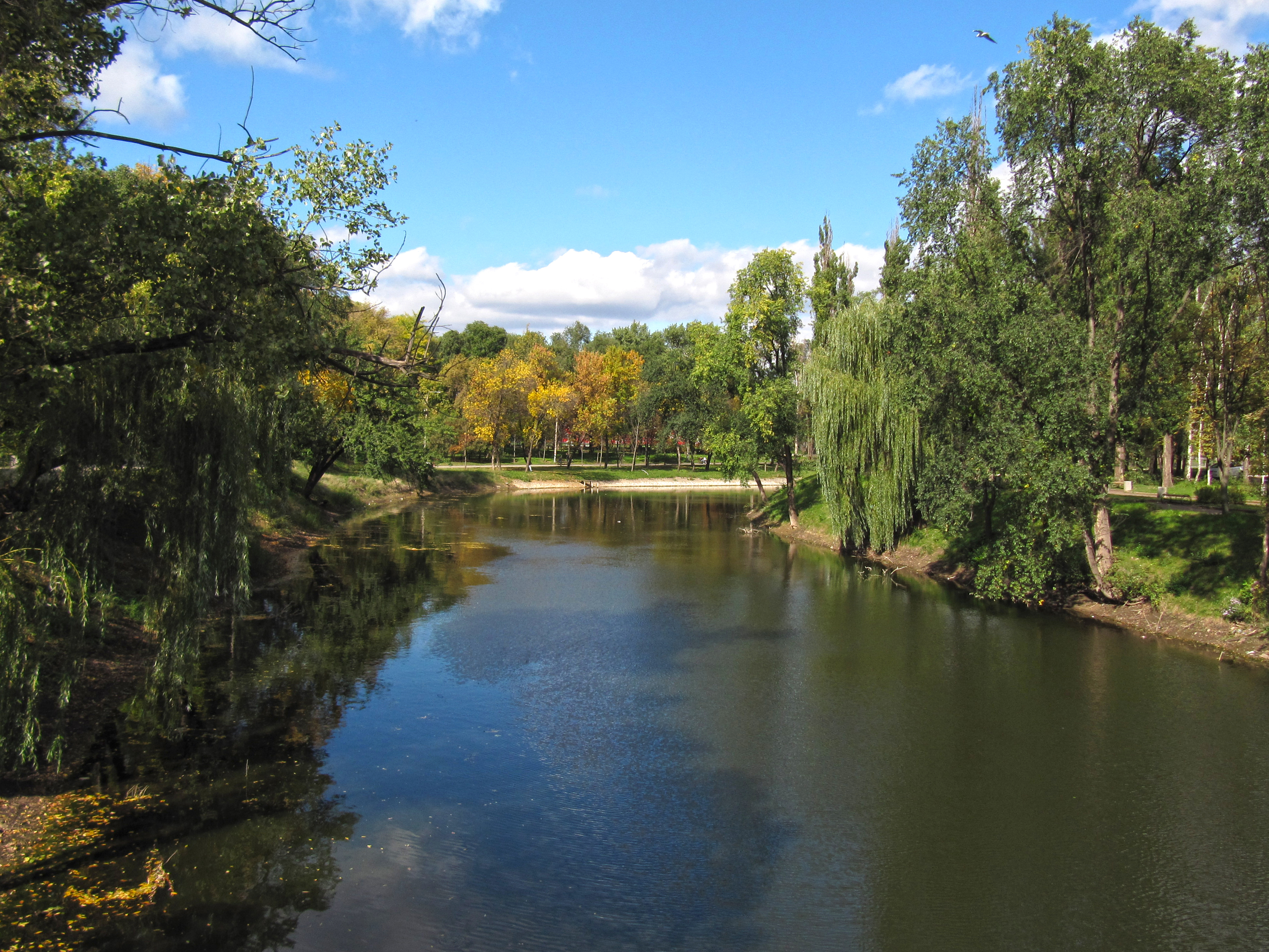
Mershavtsev Park

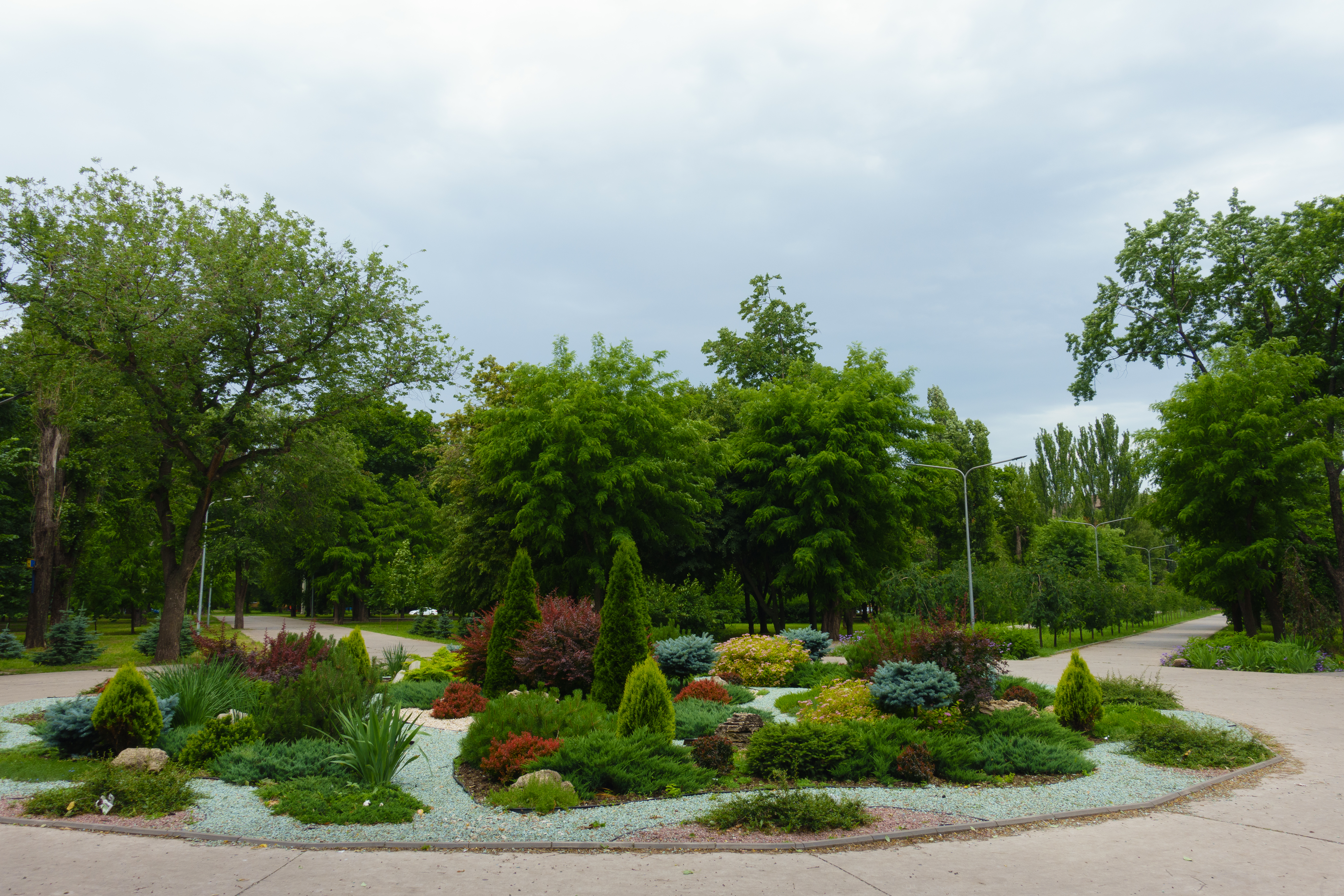
Yubileyny Park

Kryvyi Rih has few designated natural monuments: the old pear near Karnavatka, another pear of 1789, Vizyrka landscape reserve, Northern and Southern Red Beam, Amphibolite, Arkose and Skelevatski Outputs, Mopr Rocks, Slate rocks, Sandstone rock. A park named after the newspaper Pravda is very famous for its ampir boat station. Kryvyi Rih Botanical Gardens of the National Academy of Sciences of Ukraine (NAS) was established in 1980.

== Geography ==
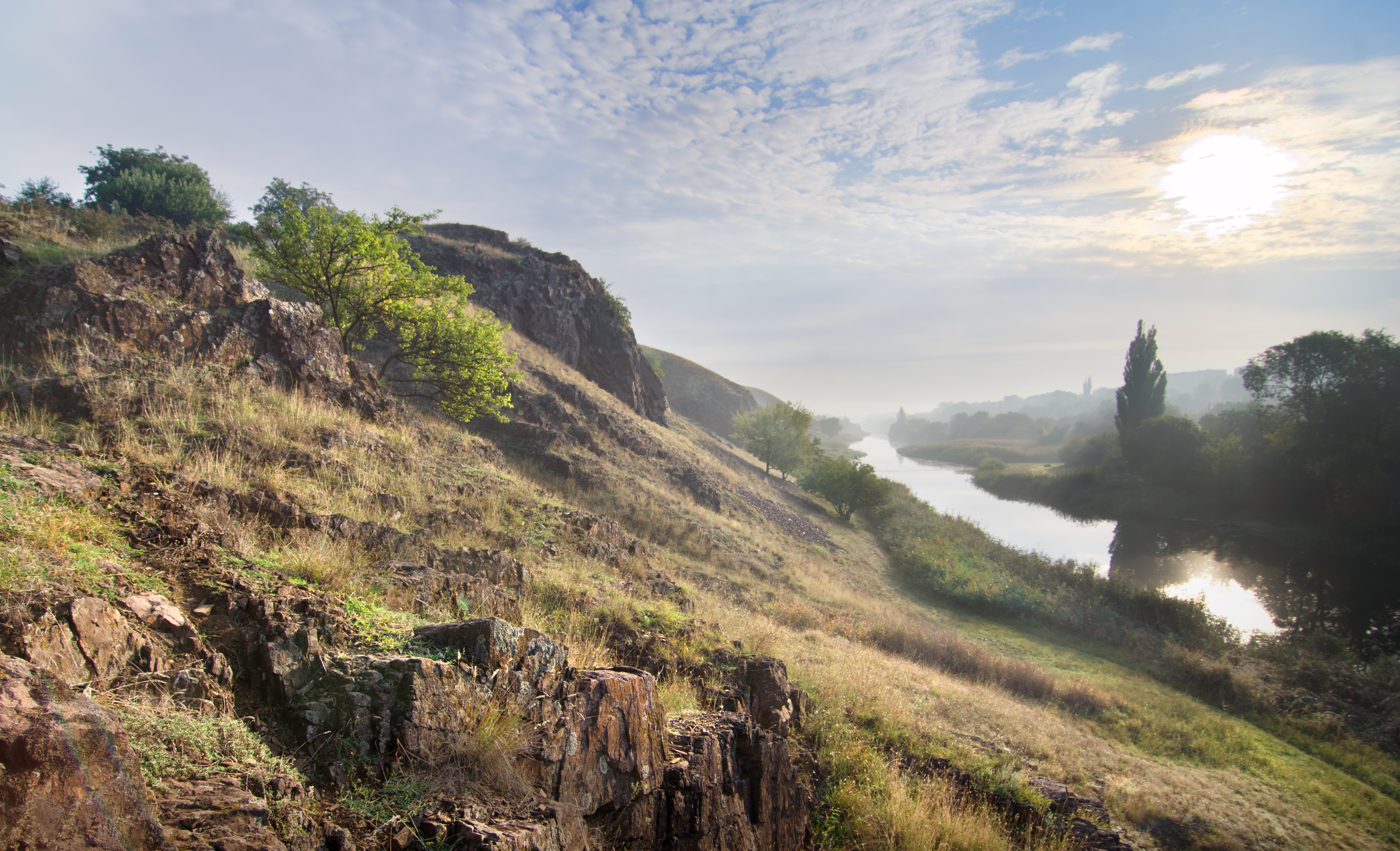
MOPR/MODR (International Red Aid) city area rocks

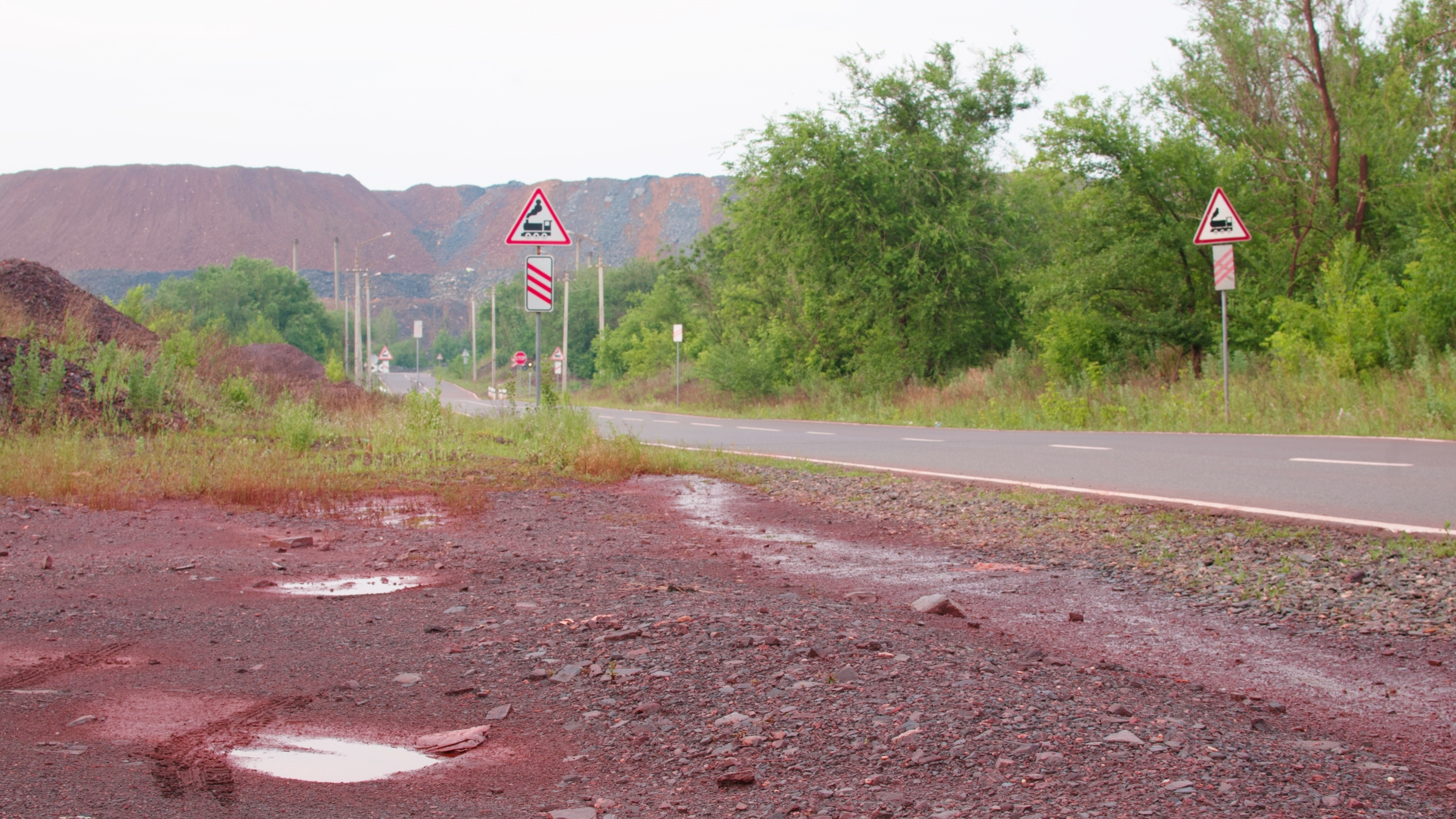
Red-colored ground is common because of the iron oxides.

Located 316 kilometres (200 mi) south of Kyiv, the city is the biggest by size within the Central Ukraine and being situated in the right-bank portion of Dnipropetrovsk Oblast. In addition, the city is located right on the conditional border where Dnieper Upland transitions to Black Sea Lowland. The Dnieper Upland is part of the Ukrainian Crystalline Shield which in the region contains number of heavy metal deposits such as iron and uranium ores and hard rock deposits like granite. Combination of the crystalline shield with the near flowing river of Dnieper causes the plain-relief river looking as mountainous and running through rapids (Dnieper rapids).

Also, the city is often claimed to be the longest in Europe. It is said up to 100 km or even 126 kilometres (78 mi) from north to south. While the city is strikingly elongated on a map, in reality the greatest distance between two points within city limits is 66.1 km. The longer figures result from drawing a line precisely following the heavily indented city limits from north to south.

The city area is not contiguous, with part of the Inhulets District being an exclave to the city proper. There isn't a continuous built up area along the full length of the city. Kryvyi Rih's shape is influenced by the ore deposits which lie parallel to it and which have been the city's mining mainstay. The city centre is on the east bank of the Inhulets River, near its confluences with its tributary river Saksahan. Both Inhulets and Saksahan change their river course in the area often bending in each direction. The confluence of the river Saksahan with the Inhulets supposedly gave the name for the city by forming a geographical crooked horn ("kryvyi rih").

The city is set in the rolling steppe land surrounded by fields of sunflowers and grain. A short distance east of the city center, there is an area along a small lake where glacial boulders were deposited. As a result, this area was never cultivated and contains one of the few remaining patches of wild steppe vegetation in the area. The city's environmental and construction safety is a growing problem due to abandoned mines and polluted ore-processing waste.

=== Climate ===
Kryvyi Rih has a dry warm hot-summer continental climate (Dfa) within to the Köppen climate classification system, like much of southern Ukraine. This tends to generate warm summers and cold winters with relatively low precipitation. Snowfalls are not common in the city, due to the urban warming effect. Districts that surround the city receive more snow and roads leading out of the city can be closed due to snow.

Climate data for Kryvyi Rih (1991–2020, extremes 1948–present)
Month	Jan	Feb	Mar	Apr	May	Jun	Jul	Aug	Sep	Oct	Nov	Dec	Year
Record high °C (°F)	15.0 (59.0)	18.9 (66.0)	24.5 (76.1)	31.8 (89.2)	35.8 (96.4)	36.4 (97.5)	39.2 (102.6)	39.6 (103.3)	36.4 (97.5)	31.7 (89.1)	21.7 (71.1)	15.3 (59.5)	39.6 (103.3)
Mean daily maximum °C (°F)	−0.7 (30.7)	1.0 (33.8)	7.2 (45.0)	15.9 (60.6)	22.2 (72.0)	26.2 (79.2)	28.7 (83.7)	28.4 (83.1)	22.2 (72.0)	14.5 (58.1)	6.3 (43.3)	1.1 (34.0)	14.4 (57.9)
Daily mean °C (°F)	−3.4 (25.9)	−2.4 (27.7)	2.7 (36.9)	10.2 (50.4)	16.3 (61.3)	20.3 (68.5)	22.6 (72.7)	22.0 (71.6)	16.3 (61.3)	9.5 (49.1)	3.0 (37.4)	−1.5 (29.3)	9.6 (49.3)
Mean daily minimum °C (°F)	−6.0 (21.2)	−5.3 (22.5)	−1.2 (29.8)	4.8 (40.6)	10.5 (50.9)	14.5 (58.1)	16.4 (61.5)	15.9 (60.6)	10.8 (51.4)	5.3 (41.5)	0.2 (32.4)	−3.9 (25.0)	5.2 (41.4)
Record low °C (°F)	−31.1 (−24.0)	−27.3 (−17.1)	−21.0 (−5.8)	−8.9 (16.0)	−2.6 (27.3)	2.8 (37.0)	7.3 (45.1)	2.8 (37.0)	−3.7 (25.3)	−10.0 (14.0)	−18.1 (−0.6)	−24.5 (−12.1)	−31.1 (−24.0)
Average precipitation mm (inches)	30 (1.2)	27 (1.1)	31 (1.2)	33 (1.3)	48 (1.9)	61 (2.4)	52 (2.0)	35 (1.4)	39 (1.5)	32 (1.3)	34 (1.3)	33 (1.3)	455 (17.9)
Average rainy days	9	7	11	9	14	12	12	7	9	12	14	9	125
Average snowy days	14	13	7	1	0	0	0	0	0	0.2	4	12	51
Average relative humidity (%)	87.1	83.6	76.2	63.1	62.1	64.2	61.9	58.0	64.5	75.5	85.0	87.9	72.4
Mean monthly sunshine hours	48	72	142	214	274	303	328	311	219	140	55	32	2,138
Source 1: Pogoda.ru.net
Source 2: NOAA (humidity and sun 1991–2020)

== Demographics ==
National communities
Russian
Armenian
Moldovan
Polish
Jewish
Romani
Georgian

Historical population
Year	Pop.	±%
1926	31,194	—
1939	130,264	+317.6%
1959	399,915	+207.0%
1970	605,065	+51.3%
1979	684,862	+13.2%
1989	751,103	+9.7%
2001	707,966	−5.7%
2011	665,080	−6.1%
2022	603,904	−9.2%

Historically, the population of Kryvyi Rih began to increase rapidly during the Interwar period, peaking at 197,000 in 1939. From then the population began to decrease rapidly. Foreign workers arrived, and there was increased building of social housing estates by the Kryvyi Rih City Council after the Second World War, such as Sotsmisto and Soniachnyi.

The 2014 estimate for the population of Kryvyi Rih was 654,900 (8th in Ukraine). This was a decrease of 4,348 since the 2013 estimate. Since 2001, the population has grown by 48,001. In 2013, deaths exceeded births by 3,589. The net migration rate is 234 (negative).

According to the UNHCR and City Council, 7,000 people have fled to Kryvyi Rih from Donetsk and Luhansk since the beginning of the Russo-Ukrainian War in 2014, not including those who did not register as asylum seekers.

Kryvyi Rih historically had a Christian majority-population. It has numerous churches, particularly in the city centre. The well-known Saviour Transfiguration Cathedral in Saksahan Raion is an Orthodox administrative centre, and the bishop of the Kryvyi Rih Eparchy has his main residence here. The town has a school of icon painting. The patron saint of the city is Saint Nicholas, as well as bishops Onufry and Porphyry.

This was long a centre of Jewish population. Its Central Synagogue was the tallest building in town in the late 19th century. The majority of the region's Jews live here, and a significant Jewish community has been re-established. Beis Shtern Shtulman Synagogue opened in 2010 in the city centre. In the early twentieth century, the city had two synagogues, located on Kaunas street. As part of the Roman Catholic Diocese of Kharkiv-Zaporizhzhia, the city has the Kostel of Mary Mother of Jesus. Kryvyi Rih is also home to Evangelical Christians, CEF, and Vedas communities.

In terms of ethnicity, ethnic Ukrainians account for the majority of the local population. Jews constituted one of the largest ethnic minorities. As of 2018, approximately 71% of Kryvyi Rih's residents were ethnic Ukrainians and 27% ethnic Russians.

Large immigrant groups include people from Korea, Poland, Moldova and Azerbaijan, as well as Assyrians and Roms. Numerous African students come to the city to attend local universities. Central city and Dovhuntsevskyi Raion are centres of population for ethnic minorities.

The Kryvyi Rih Metropolitan Region (KMR) had a population over 1,010,000 in 2010. In addition to Kryvyi Rih, the KMR (factually) includes far more than five raions, and numerous territories in central and southern parts of Ukraine. The KMR is the sixth-largest within Ukraine.

=== 2001 census ===
As of the Ukrainian national census in 2001, Kryvyi Rih had a population of 710,412 inhabitants. The city is home to a large number of different ethnic groups. Ethnic Ukrainians (79.1%) accounted for the overwhelming majority of the population, while people who claimed to have a Russian background (17.7%) made up the second-largest group. The exact ethnic composition was as follows:

Ethnic groups in Kryvyi Rih
	percent
Ukrainians	79.09%
Russians	17.71%
Belarusians	0.96%
Jews	0.26%
Armenians	0.22%
Azerbaijanis	0.18%
Gypsies	0.17%
Moldovans	0.13%
Tatars	0.11%
Germans	0.09%

In terms of native languages, 70.8% of the population spoke Ukrainian, while 27.6% spoke Russian. Smaller linguistic minorities spoke Belarusian, Romani or Armenian. The exact linguistic composition was as follows:

First languages (2001)
	percent
Ukrainian	70.8%
Russian	27.6%
Belarusian	0.2%
Armenian	0.1%
Romani	0.1%
others	0.3%

== Economy ==
In 2020 Kryvyi Rih's share of Ukraine's national GDP was about 7%. In mid-2014, Kryvyi Rih had an IPI of ₴41.6bn about $3bn, with 17.9% growth. Exports reached $2.520m (a 4.9% decrease), Import – $276m. The city has received $4.899m of foreign investments, mainly from Germany, Cyprus, Netherlands, and the UK.

The average wage in September 2021 was ₴10.258 ($384). Official unemployment throughout 2018 averaged 0.95%.

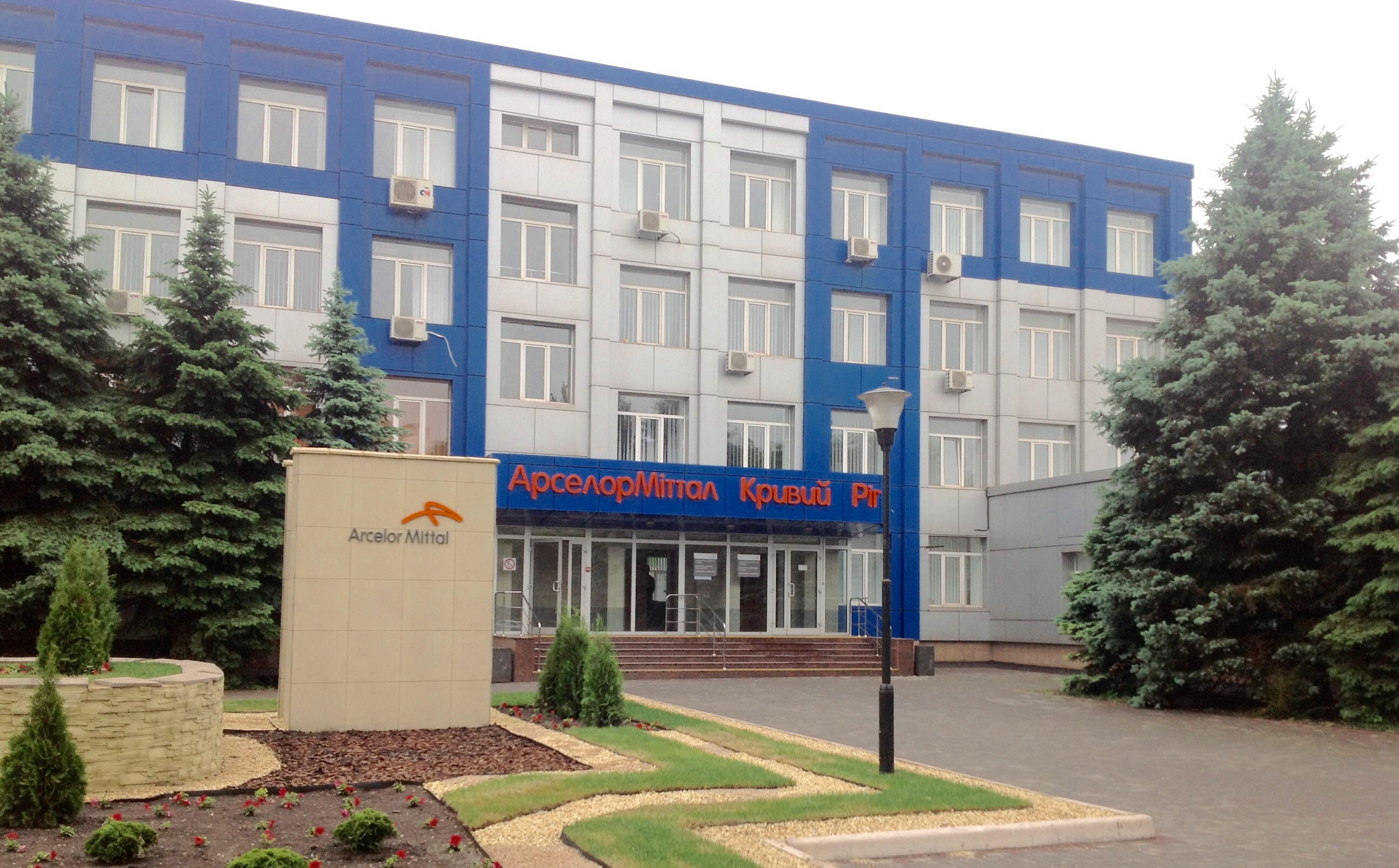
ArcelorMittal Kryvyi Rih

Processing and the mining industry – are the two largest sectors of Kryvyi Rih's economy. Rest fraction is about 50%. The city has over 53 plants, mines and factories. ArcelorMittal Kryvyi Rih, owned by ArcelorMittal since 2005, is the largest private company by revenue in Ukraine, producing over 7 million tonnes of crude steel, and mined over 17 million tonnes of iron ore. As of 2011, the company employed about 37 000 people. The 4 Iron Ore Enrichment Works of Metinvest are a large contributors to the UA's balance of payments. Other giants of the city are the Evraz mining company and HeidelbergCement.

== Transport ==
Local public transportation in Kryvyi Rih includes the Metrotram (subway), buses and minibus lines, trolleybuses (in operation since 1957, the system presently comprises 23 routes), trams (one of the world's largest tram networks, operating on 88.1 kilometres (54.7 miles) of total route; as of 2014, it was composed of 13 lines) and, taxi.

The publicly owned and operated Kryvyi Rih Metrotram is the fastest, the most convenient and affordable network that covers most, but not all, of the city. The Metrotram is continuously expanding towards the city limits to meet growing demand, currently has two lines with a total length of 18.7 kilometres (11.6 miles) and 11 stations. Despite its designation as a "metro tram" and its use of tram cars as rolling stock, the Kryvyi Rih Metrotram is a complete rapid transit system with enclosed stations and tracks separated both from roads and from the city's conventional tram lines. City public transport serviced 66m persons in the first part of 2014.

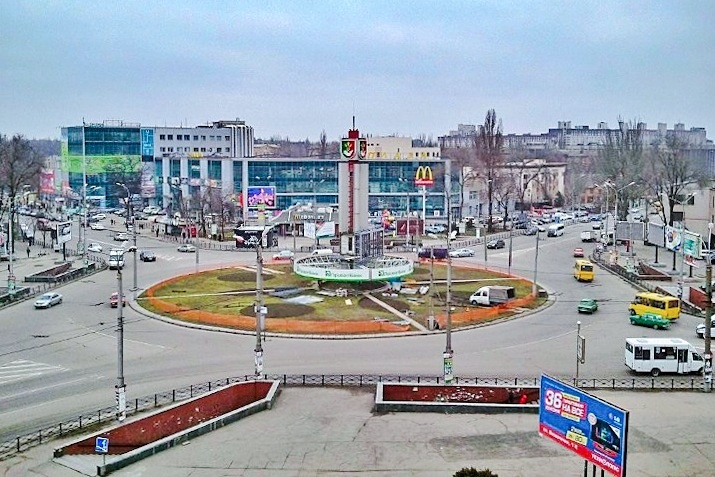
Quarter 95

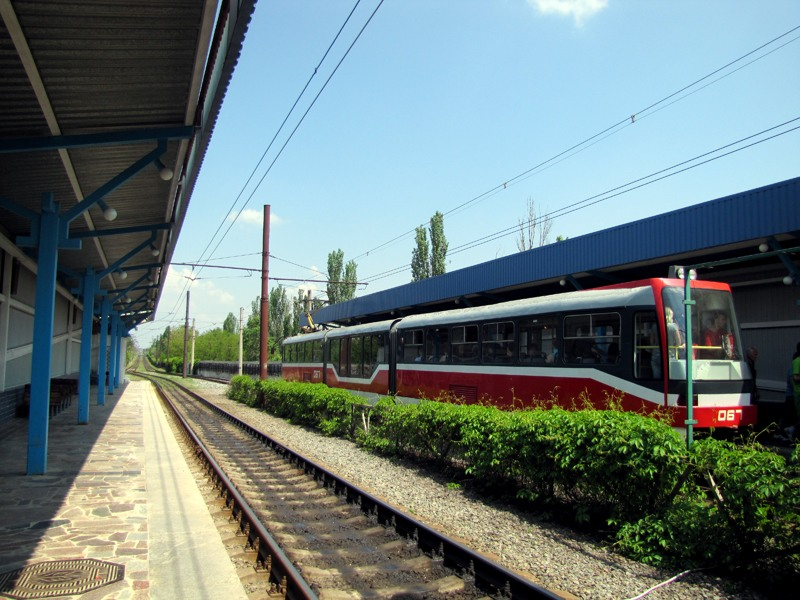
Kryvyi Rih Metrotram

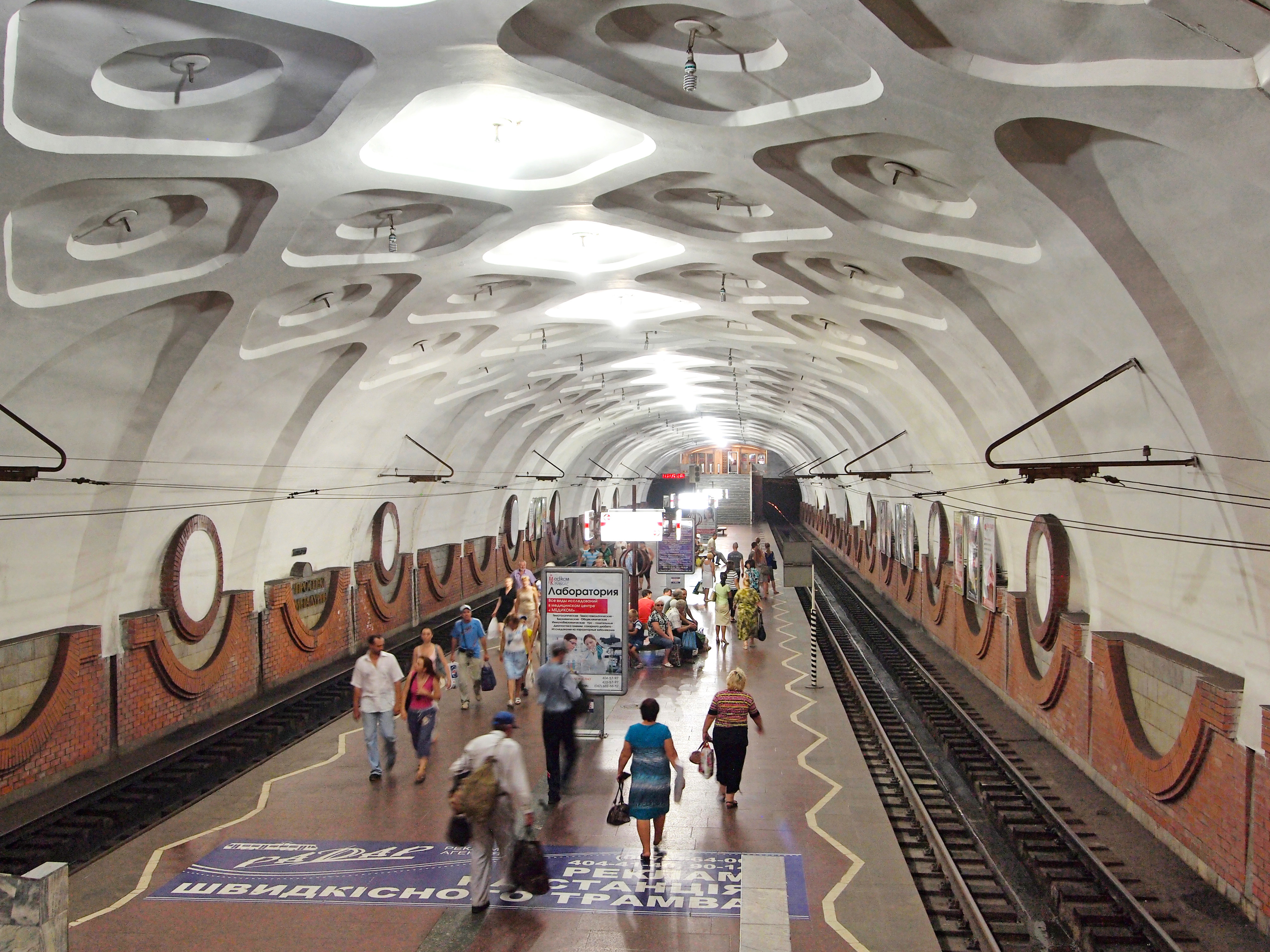
Prospekt Metalurhiv station of the Kryvyi Rih Metrotram was opened in 1989

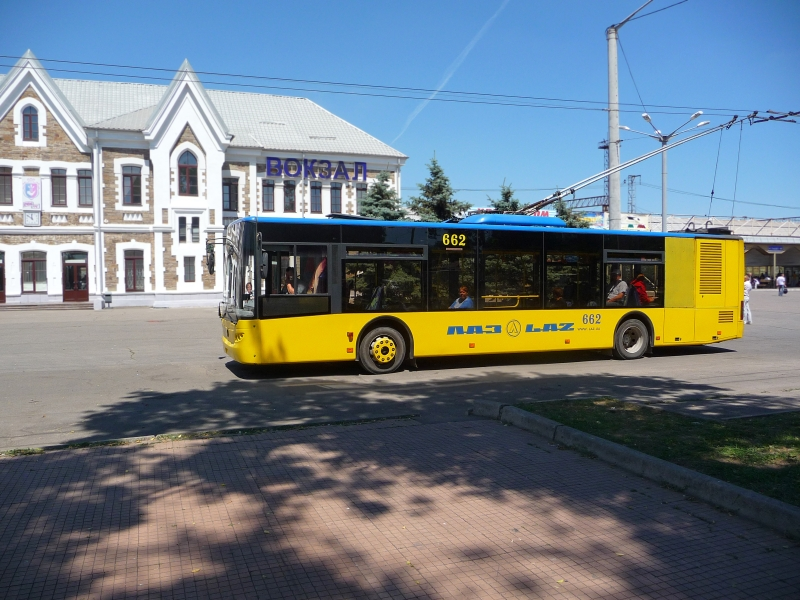
Trolleybuses in Kryvyi Rih

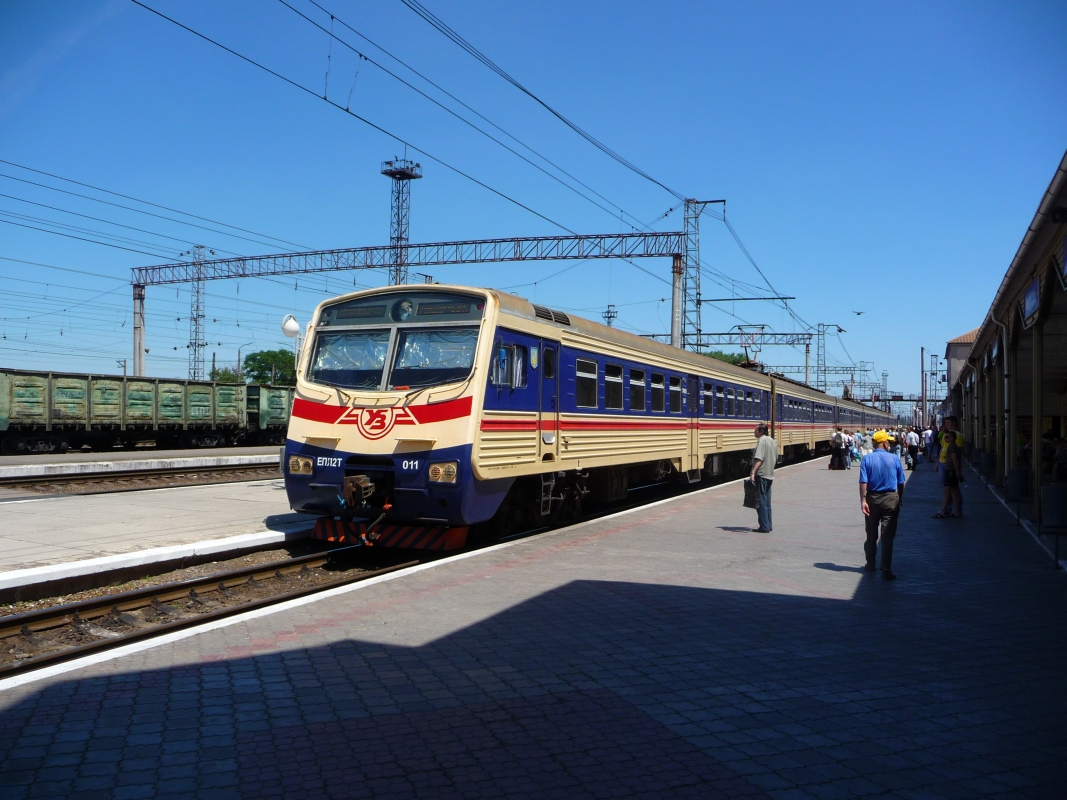
Commuter rail train at the Kryvyi Rih Main Station. The city's railroads have a long history.

In May 2021, Kryvyi Rih became the first city in Ukraine to introduce free travel in public transport for its citizens. In order not to pay for municipal transport one must show a special electronic "Kryvyi Rih Card".

The historic tram system, once a well maintained and widely used method of transport, is now gradually being phased out in favor of buses and trolleybuses.

The taxi system is expansive but not regulated. In particular, the taxi fare per kilometer is not regulated. There is a fierce competition between private taxi companies.

Kryvyi Rih International Airport is the airport that serves the city. It is located 17.5 km (10.9 Miles) northwest of the city of Kryvyi Rih.

== Education ==
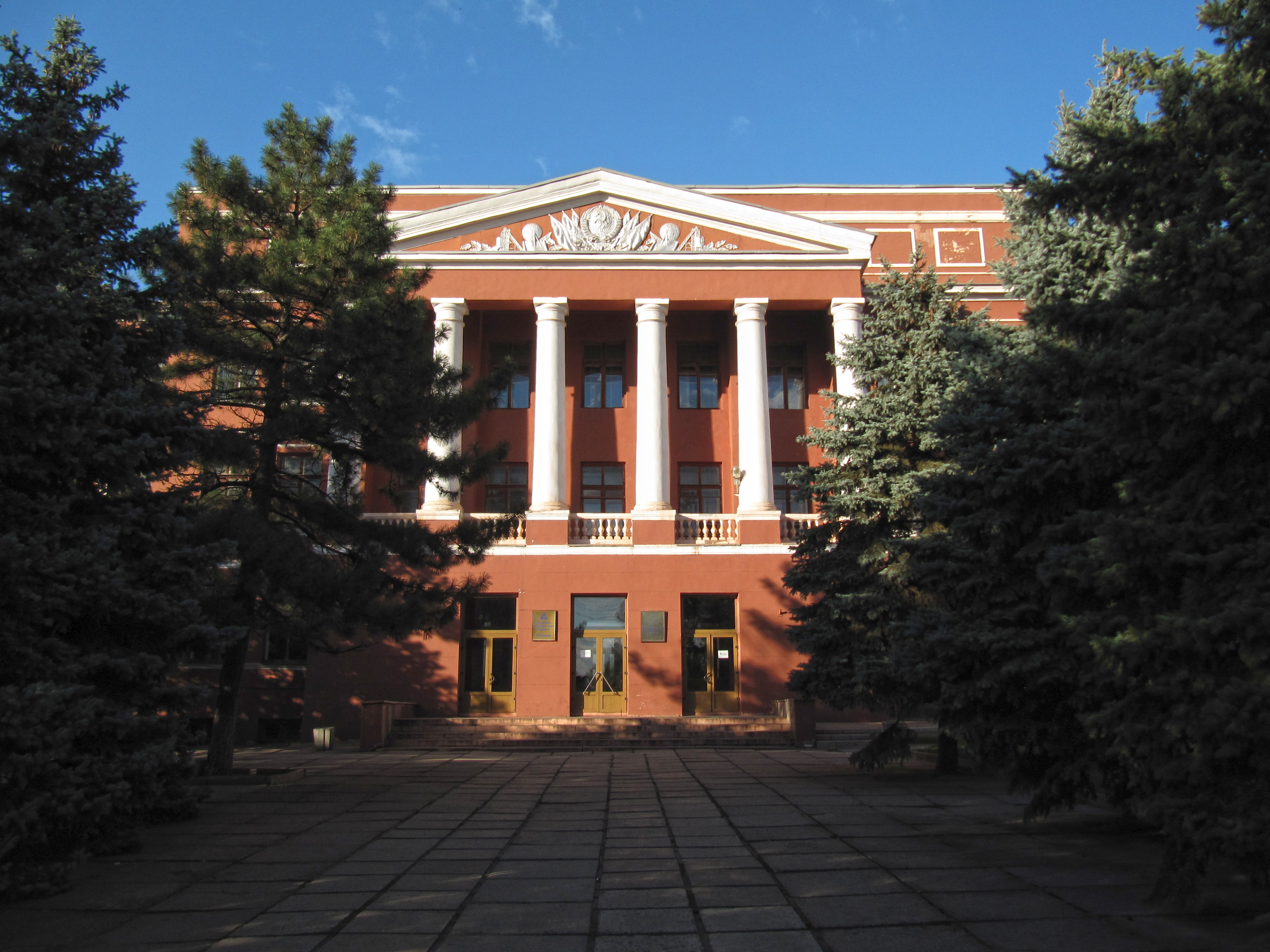
Kryvyi Rih National University's original building

Kryvyi Rih National University, a major institution, was originally formed as a college and Mining Institute in 1929. It gained university status in 1982. Kryvyi Rih Pedagogical Institute was founded in 1930 as an Institute of Vocational Training, and is the oldest pedagogical institution in Kryvyi Rih, reorganized as a Pedagogical Institute. In 2011 the Cabinet of Ukraine founded Kryvyi Rih National University by uniting the Mining Institute, Pedagogical University, Economic Institute of Kyiv National Economic University and Department of the National Metallurgical Academy of Ukraine.

Other institutions include the local Department of Dnipropetrovsk State University of Internal Affairs, campuses of Zaporizhzhia National University, National University Odesa Law Academy and Interregional Academy of Personnel Management, college of National Aviation University.

In 2014 Donetsk Tugan-Baranovsky National University of Economics and Trade was evacuated to Kryvyi Rih after a start of the Russo-Ukrainian War.

There are 149 general secondary schools and 150 nursery schools and kindergartens in Kryvyi Rih. There are evening schools for adults, musical, art, sports and specialist technical schools.

== Sport ==
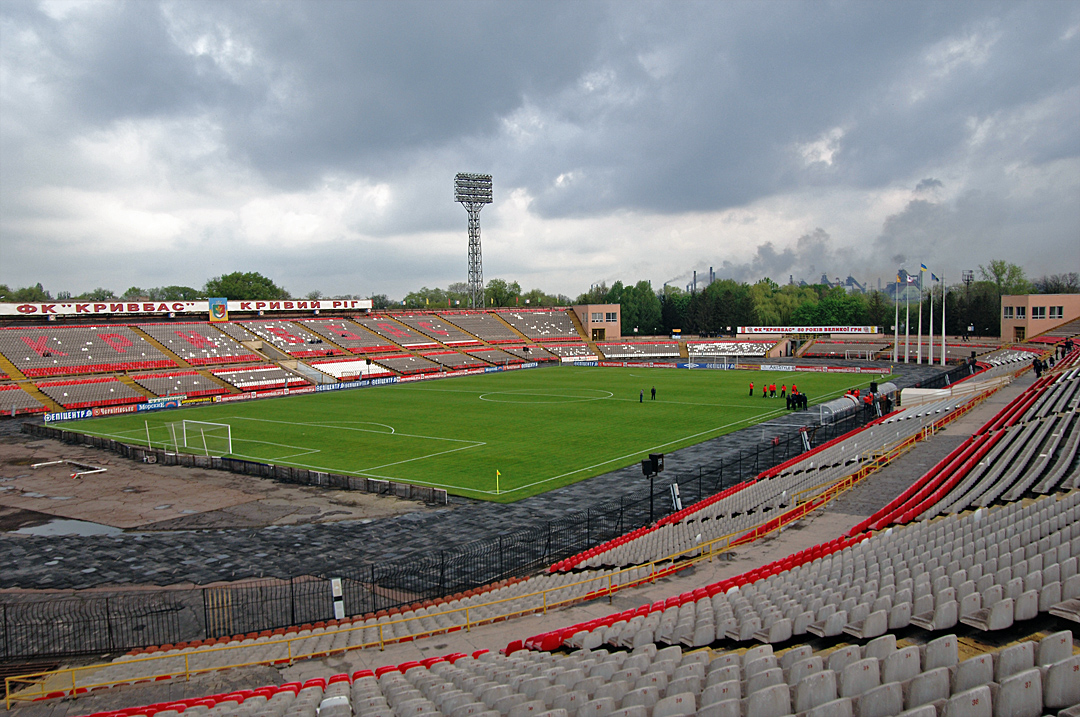
Metalurh Stadium, the home ground of FC Kryvbas Kryvyi Rih

FC Hirnyk Kryvyi Rih was a football club founded in 1925 based in Kryvyi Rih, dissolved in 2020.

Kryvyi Rih was home to another football team, FC Kryvbas Kryvyi Rih. The team was founded as FC Kryvyi Rih in 1959. The next year it was part of the republican sports society Avanhard. After a couple of years, it changed to Hirnyk, before obtaining current its name in 1966. Kryvbas debuted in the Ukrainian Premier League in the 1992–93 season. They had been in the top league since their debut, with their best finish in third place in the 1998–99 and 1999–2000 seasons.

At the end of the 2012–13 season the team finished in 7th place. Due to financial difficulties the club declared itself bankrupt in June 2013. FC Kryvbas-2 Kryvyi Rih was the reserve team of Kryvbas. In 1998 the club entered into the professional leagues to compete in the Second League. In 3 seasons the club moved to the Amateur Level before competing one last time in Second League.

SC Kryvbas is a professional basketball club. Achievements of the team are winning the Ukrainian Basketball League in 2009 and winning the Higher League in 2003 and 2004. Since 2010 the team is active in the Ukrainian Basketball SuperLeague.

The city is famous for its annual autorally. It was also the birthplace of the Ukrainian tennis players Valeria Bondarenko, Alona Bondarenko and Kateryna Bondarenko.

== Notable people ==
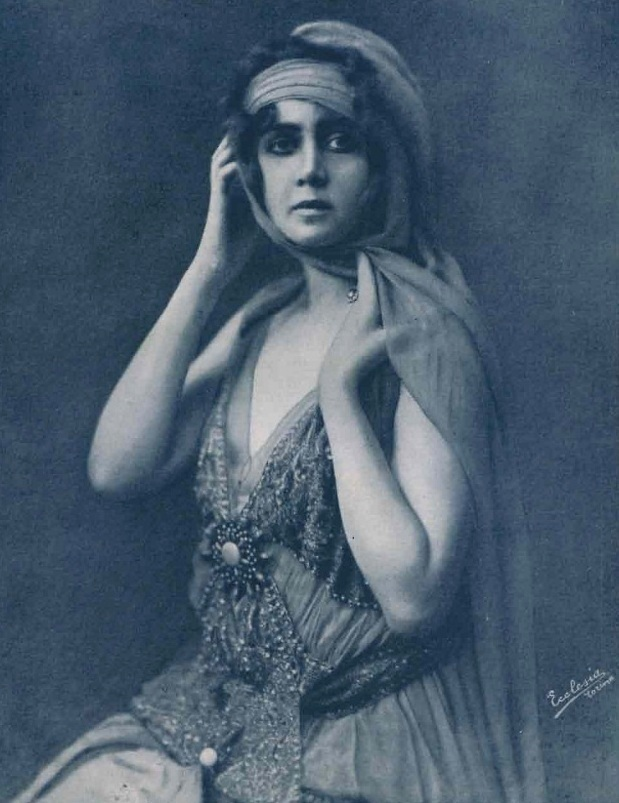
Helena Makowska, 1916

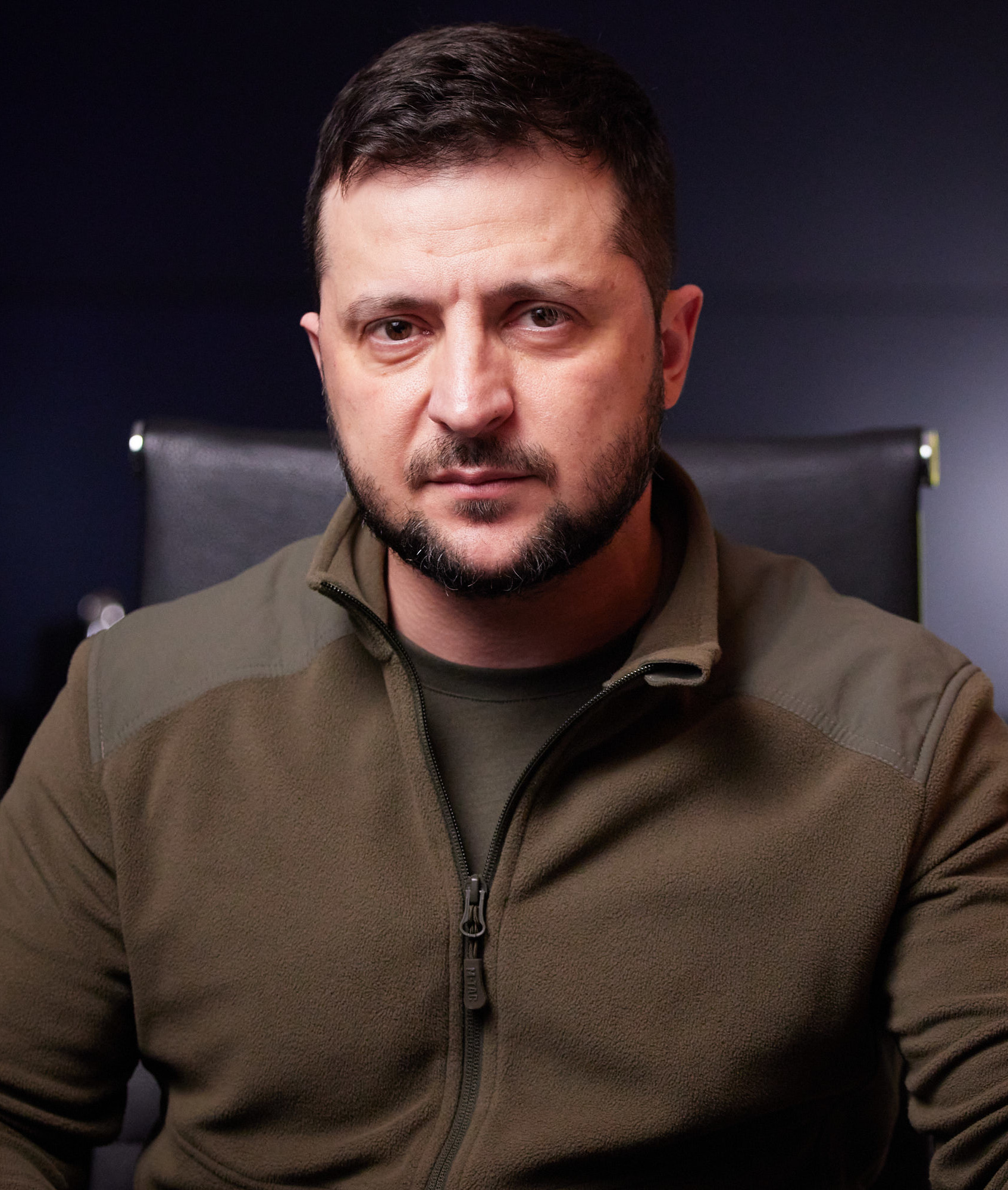
Volodymyr Zelenskyy, 2022

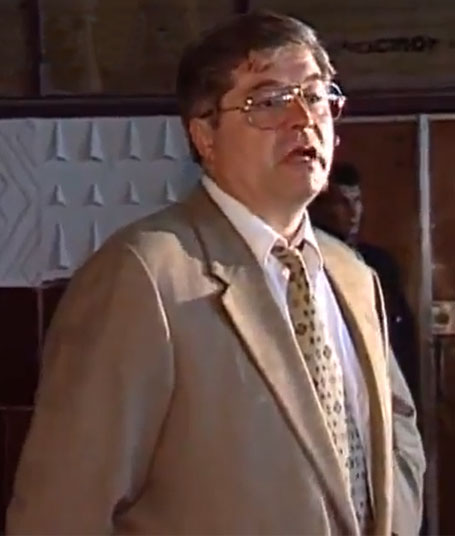
Pavlo Lazarenko, 1996

- Aliona Babak (born 1969) a Ukrainian politician, former Minister of Regional Development
- Ivan Bakanov (born 1975) politician, Head of the Security Service of Ukraine from 2019 to 2022
- Brunettes Shoot Blondes (formed 2010) a Ukrainian indie rock band
- Olga Dibrova (born 1977) Ukraine's Ambassador to Finland
- Eduard Drach (born 1965) аn influential composer, singer-songwriter, kobzar and bandurist
- Vitalii Dribnytsia (born 1965), historian, history teacher, co-author of school books and YouTuber
- Petro Dyminskyi (born 1954) a Ukrainian businessman, politician
- EeOneGuy (born 1996) a Ukrainian YouTuber, Let's Player
- Andrey Filatov (born 1971) a Russian entrepreneur and chess enthusiast
- Eugenie Gershoy (1901–1986) an American sculptor and watercolorist
- Boris Glinka (1914–1967) & Dmitry Glinka (1917–1979) brothers, WWII Soviet flying aces
- Mykhailo Korolenko (born 1962) a Ukrainian politician and civil servant
- Mari Kraimbrery (born 1992) a Russian singer
- Olena Kravets (born 1977) an actress, producer and TV host
- Pavlo Lazarenko (born 1953) Prime Minister of Ukraine in 1996–97
- Helena Makowska (1893–1964) a Polish actress in over 60 films between 1911 and 1958
- Vladimir Malakhov (born 1968) a ballet dancer and artistic director of the Berlin State Ballet from 2004 to 2014
- Serhii Nykyforov (born 1986) press secretary of the office of the Ukrainian president
- Zlata Ognevich (born 1986) a Ukrainian singer, Eurovision 2013 contestant
- Oleksandr Popov (born 1960) a Ukrainian politician and businessman
- Yuri Salko (born 1964) Ukrainian visual artist, works in painting, graphics and sculpture
- Serhiy Shefir (born 1964) Ukrainian politician, film director and Presidential assistant
- Zoia Skoropadenko (born 1978) a contemporary mixed-media artist, based in Monaco
- Hennadiy Udovenko (1931–2013) politician and diplomat, Minister of Foreign Affairs 1994–1998
- Oleksandr Vilkul (born 1974) statesman, Vice Prime Minister of Ukraine, 2012–2014
- Olena Zelenska (born 1978) architect and screenwriter, First Lady of Ukraine
- Volodymyr Zelenskyy (born 1978) politician and former comedic actor; 6th and current President of Ukraine since 2019

=== Sport ===
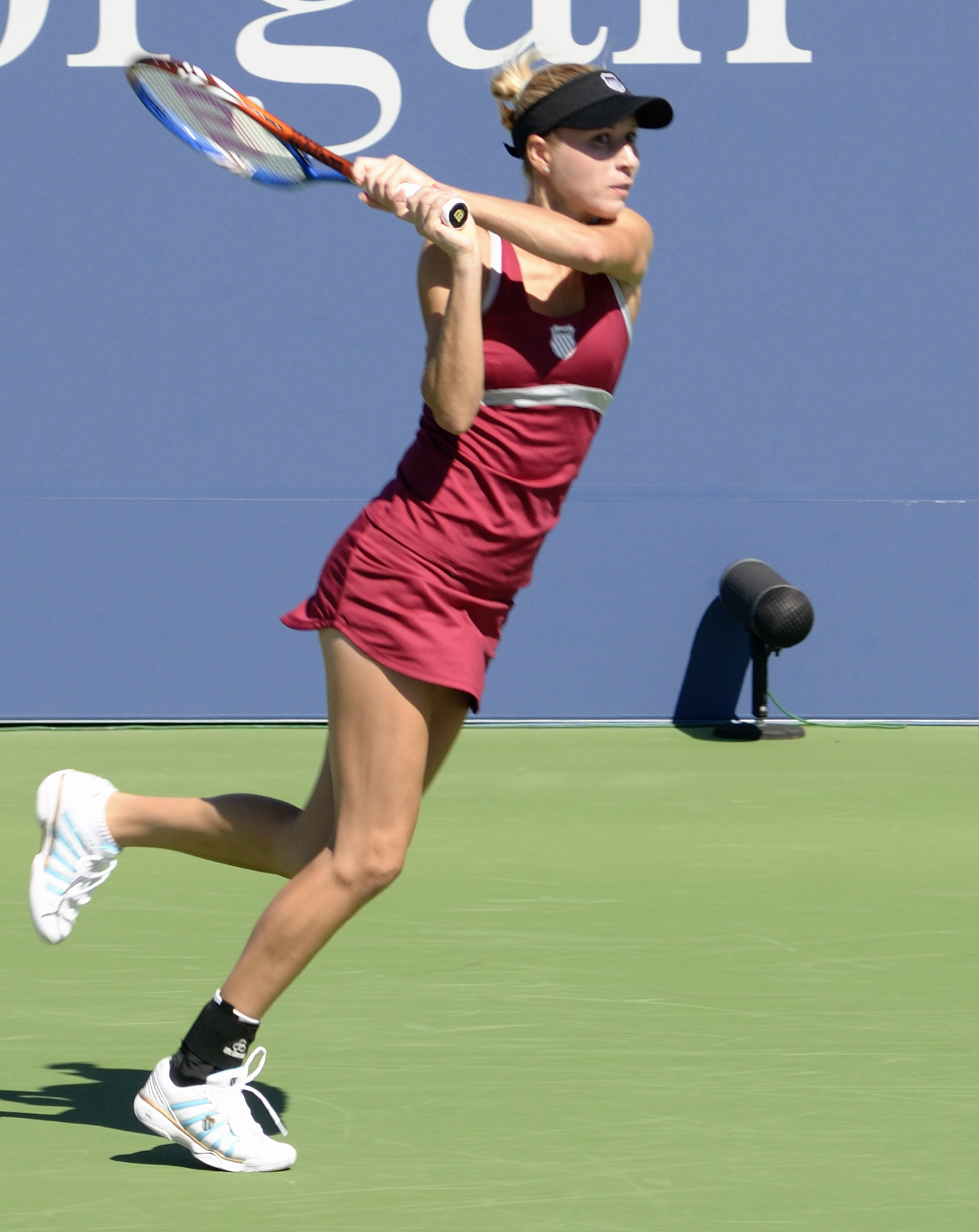
Alona Bondarenko, 2011

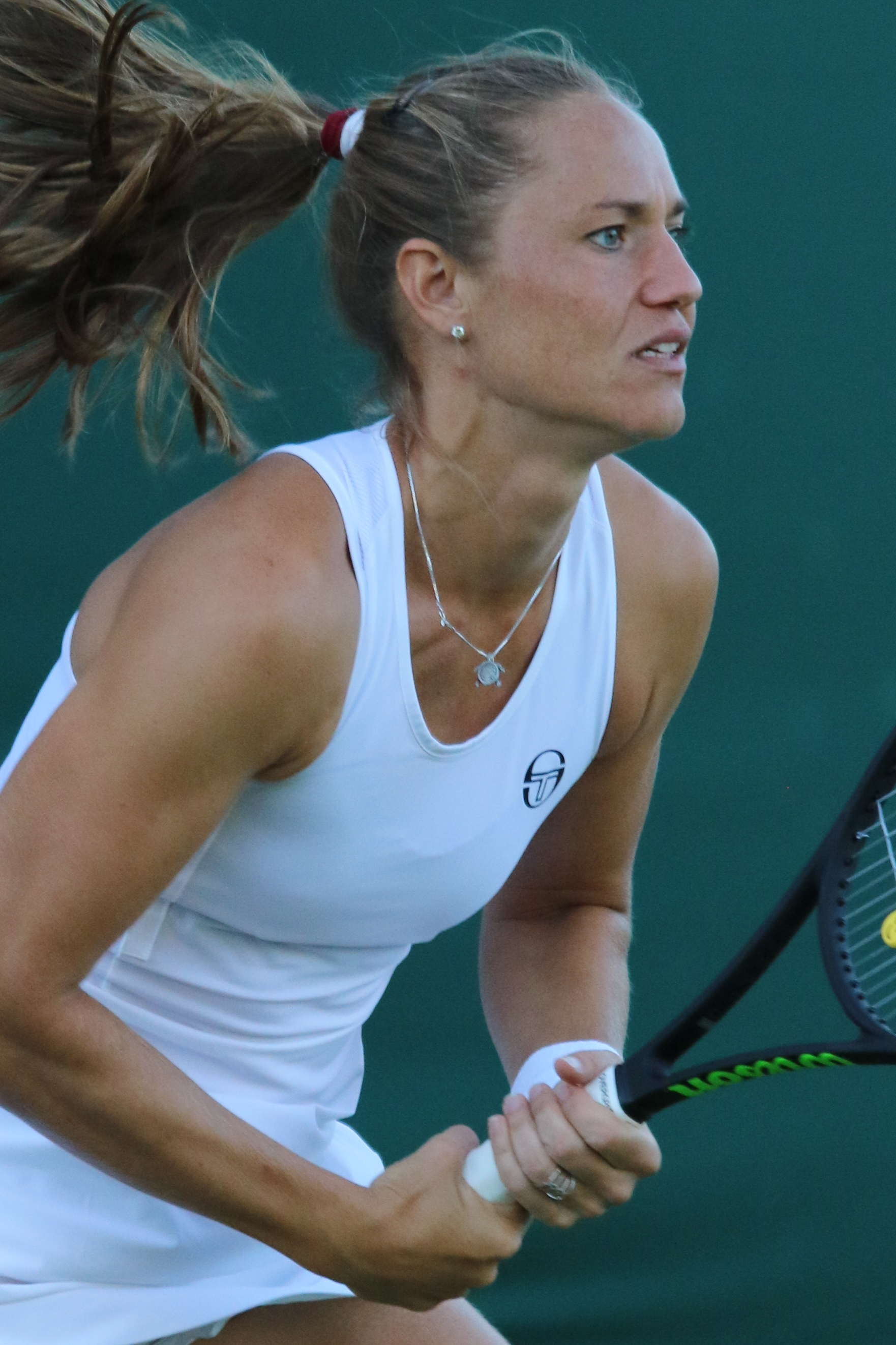
Kateryna Bondarenko, 2018

- Daryna Apanashchenko (born 1986) a footballer with 128 caps for Ukraine women
- Alona Bondarenko (born 1984) a tennis player, doubles champion in 2008 Australian Open
- Kateryna Bondarenko (born 1986) a tennis player, doubles champion in 2008 Australian Open
- Valeria Bondarenko (born 1982) a tennis player, won 8 doubles titles on the ITF Circuit
- Denis Cyplenkov (born 1982), armwrestler
- Sergey Fesenko Sr. (born 1959) 200m. swimmer, gold medallist at the 1980 Summer Olympics
- Sergei Makarenko (born 1937) a sprint canoeist and team gold medallist at the 1960 Summer Olympics
- Vladimir Maslachenko (1936–2010) a Soviet footballer (goalkeeper) and football commentator
- Serhiy Palkin (born 1974) football functionary, general director of FC Shakhtar Donetsk
- Vadim Yaroshchuk (born 1968) a 200m. swimmer, two-time Bronze medal winner at the 1988 Summer Olympics

== Twin towns – sister cities ==
Kryvyi Rih is twinned with:

- (Georgia (country)) Rustavi, Georgia
- Handan, China

=== Friendly cities ===
- Košice, Slovakia
- Lublin, Poland
- Miskolc, Hungary

== See also ==
- List of people from Kryvyi Rih
