= Kryvyi Rih City Council =

Kryvyi Rih City Council Криворізька міська рада

Type
- Type: Unicameral

Leadership
- Chairman (Mayor): Yuriy Vilkul (acting), Bloc Vilkul — Ukrainian perspective 25 August 2021 - present
- Secretary: None

Structure
- Seats: 54
- Political groups: Vilkul Bloc – Ukrainian Perspective (19); Servant of the People (16); Power of the People (5); European Solidarity (5); Opposition Platform — For Life (9)
- Length of term: 5 years

Elections
- Last election: 25 October 2020
- Next election: 2025 (May be postponed due to martial law in Ukraine)

Meeting place
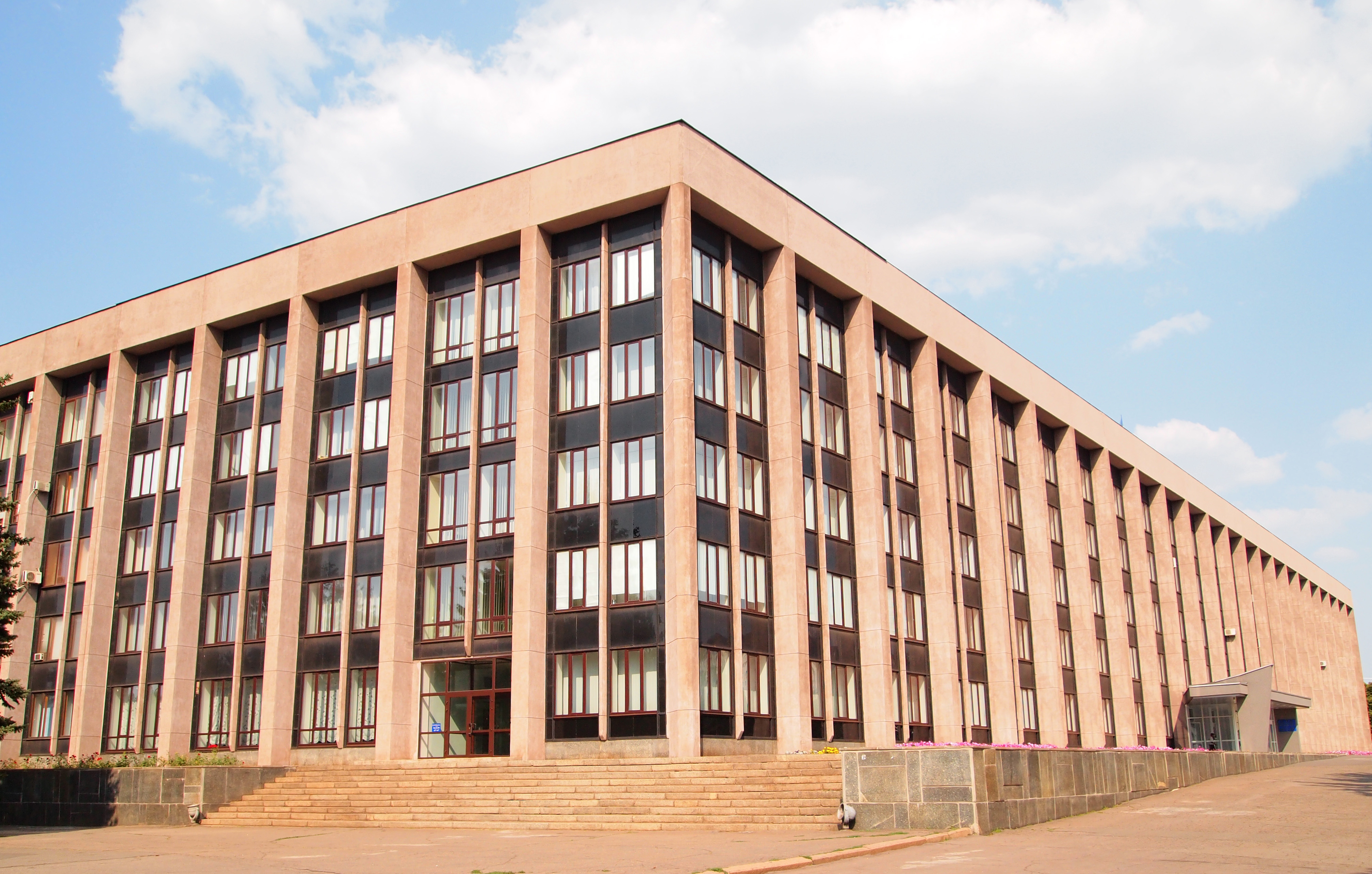
- 1 Molodizhna Square, Kryvyi Rih, Ukraine; 47°54′22″N 33°23′39″E

Website
- kr.gov.ua

Kryvyi Rih City Council is a local government body of Kryvyi Rih urban hromada in Dnipropetrovsk Oblast. The administrative center is Kryvyi Rih.

== Overview ==
The City Council Assambly of the city makes up the administration's legislative branch, thus effectively making it a city council (or rada). The municipal council is made up of 54 elected members, who are each elected to represent a certain district of the city for a five-year term. The current council is the eighth in the city's modern history, and was elected in 2020.

In the regular meetings of the municipal council, problems facing the city are discussed, and annually the city's budget is drawn up. The council has 33 standing commissions which play an important role in controlling the finances and trading practices of the city and its merchants.

The council governs a territory of 431 square kilometres (166 sq mi), with a total population of 647,142 as of August 2015. The Saksahan and Inhulets River flow through this territory.

== Administrative divisions ==
The city council oversees:

- The city of Kryvyi Rih
  - Dovhyntsivskyi District
  - Inhuletskyi District
  - Metalurhiinyi District
  - Pokrovskyi District
  - Saksahanskyi District
  - Ternivskyi District (includes the settlements of Hirnytske, Kolomiitseve, and the villages Novoivanivka and Ternuvatyi Kut)
  - Tsentralno-Miskyi District (includes the settlement Avanhard)

== Composition of the council ==
The 8th Kryvyi Rih City Council consists of 54 deputies and the head of the council (the city mayor), elected for a five-year term. The council addresses city-wide issues and adopts the city budget.

=== Current composition ===
The current council was elected in the 2020 Ukrainian local elections. The following are the parties represented

- Vilkul Bloc – Ukrainian Perspective: 19 seats
- Servant of the People: 16 seats
- Power of the People: 5 seats
- European Solidarity: 5 seats
- Opposition Platform — For Life: 9 seats

=== Past composition ===
The following is the council's composition after the 2006 election and 2010 election respectively:

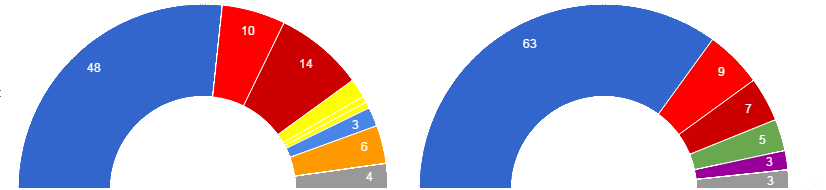
Composition of Kryvyi Rih Assembly, 2006 - 2010 Party of Regions Communist Party Batkivschyna Hromada Party People's Party NUNS Front for Change Strong Ukraine Nonpartisan
