= Kryvyi Rih urban hromada =

Urban hromada in Dnipropetrovsk Oblast, Ukraine

Kryvyi Rih urban hromada Криворізька міська громада
- Hromada
- Seal
- Interactive map of Kryvyi Rih urban hromada
- Country: Ukraine
- Oblast: Dnipropetrovsk Oblast
- Raion: Kryvyi Rih Raion

Area
  - Total: 431.9 km^{2} (166.8 sq mi)

Population (2020)
  - Total: 606,584
  - Density: 1,404/km^{2} (3,638/sq mi)
- Settlements: 6
- Cities: 1
- Rural settlements: 3
- Villages: 2
- Website: kr.gov.ua

Kryvyi Rih urban territorial hromada (Ukrainian: Криворізька територіальна громада, romanized: Kryvorizka terytorialna hromada) is a hromada (municipality) in central Ukraine, in Kryvyi Rih Raion of Dnipropetrovsk Oblast. The administrative center is the city of Kryvyi Rih. The municipality is governed by a mayor and city council which work cooperatively to ensure the smooth-running of the city and procure its municipal bylaws. The city's budget is also controlled by the administration.

Administratively, until 2020, Kryvyi Rih was designated a city of oblast significance, which placed the municipality at the same level of administration as that of a raion, and thus directly subordinate to the oblast. On 18 July 2020, as part of the administrative reform of Ukraine, the number of raions of Dnipropetrovsk Oblast was reduced to seven, and the status of Kryvyi Rih Municipality was subordinated directly to the enlarged Kryvyi Rih Raion. The last estimate of the municipality population was 622,012 (2020 est.).

The municipality consists of 1 city (Kryvyi Rih proper) and 5 villages. The Kryvyi Rih City Council is the elected legislature that governs the hromada.

The area of the hromada is 431.9 square kilometres (166.8 mi^{2}), and the population is 606,584 (2022 estimate).

== Jurisdiction ==
Kryvyi Rih Municipality is divided into seven administrative urban raions (city districts), each with its own administrative bodies subordinate to the municipality:

- Metalurhiinyi District
- Tsentralno-Miskyi District
- Ternivskyi District
- Saksahanskyi District
- Inhuletskyi District
- Pokrovskyi District
- Dovhyntsivskyi District

The municipality and its urban raions include the settlements of:

Cities:

- Kryvyi Rih

Rural settlements:

- Avanhard
- Hirnytske
- Kolomiitseve

Villages:

- Novoivanivka
- Ternuvatyi Kut

== Services and facilities ==
Notable services provided and facilities managed by Kryvyi Rih City Council include:

- Kryvyi Rih International Airport
- Kryvyi Rih Metrotram
- Trams in Kryvyi Rih
- Trolleybuses in Kryvyi Rih
- Chervoniy Girnik (The Red Miner) (newspaper)
- Rudana (TV)
- 1 KR (TV)
