= Vilkul =

Vilkul (Ukrainian: Вілкул) is a Ukrainian surname, usually referring to a political family from Dnipropetrovsk Oblast, and includes:

- Yuriy Vilkul (born 1949): Former elected and current acting mayor of Kryvyi Rih
- Oleksandr Vilkul (born 1974): Former Vice Prime Minister of Ukraine, People's Deputy of Ukraine, and Governor of Dnipropetrovsk Oblast
- Tetyana Vilkul (born 1969), Ukrainian historian
