= Historical centre of Kryvyi Rih =

Historic centre of Kryvyi Rih Історичний центр Кривого Рогу
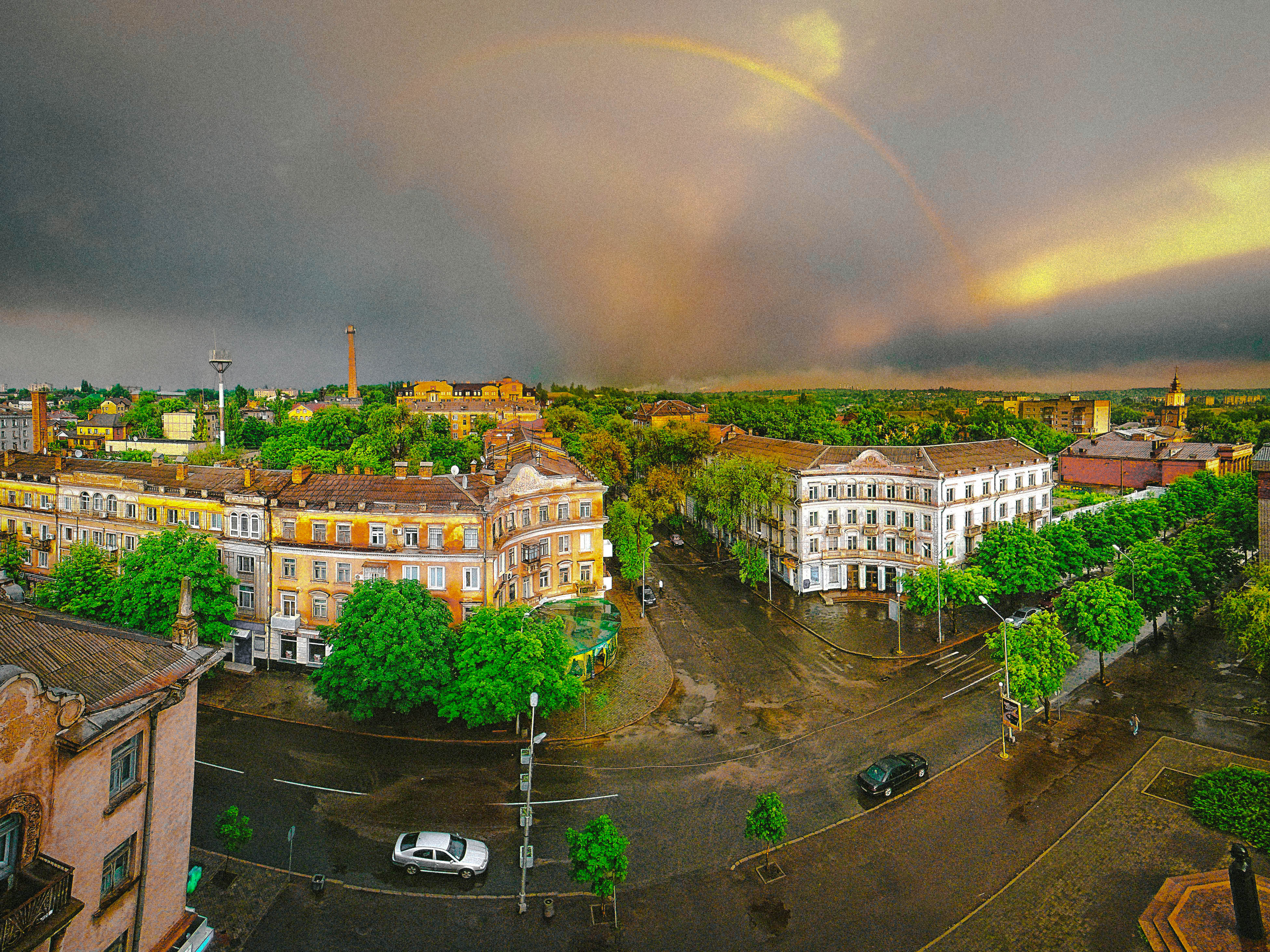
- Interactive map of Historic centre of Kryvyi Rih
- Coordinates: 47°54′05″N 33°20′26″E
- Country: Ukraine
- City: Kryvyi Rih
- District: Tsentralno-Miskyi District

The historic centre of Kryvyi Rih (colloquially called The Town — short for 'Old Town') is an area in Central City District) of Kryvyi Rih, which was the core of the city's formation. It is located in the area of the former confluence of the Inhulets and Saksahan rivers, and has a linear and elongated block structure.
