= Kostiantyn Pavlov =

Ukrainian politician (1973-2021)

- Костянтин Павлов
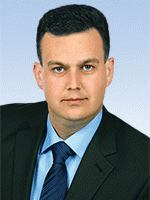
- An official portrait of him from 2017.

People's Deputy of Ukraine
- In office 12 December 2012 – 27 November 2014
- Constituency: Dnipropetrovsk Oblast, No. 31
- In office 27 November 2014 – 29 August 2019
- Constituency: Dnipropetrovsk Oblast, No. 31

Mayor of Kryvyi Rih
- In office 17 December 2020 – 15 August 2021
- Preceded by: Yuriy Vilkul
- Succeeded by: Yuriy Vilkul (acting)

Personal details
- Born: Kostiantyn Yurievich Pavlov; 12 January 1973 Kryvyi Rih, Ukrainian SSR, Soviet Union
- Died: 15 August 2021 (aged 48) Vilne (Kryvyi Rih Raion), Ukraine
- Party: Party of Regions (2005-2014); Opposition Bloc (2014-2019); Opposition Platform – For Life (2020-2021)
- Education: Interregional Academy of Personnel Management

Kostiantyn Yurievich Pavlov (Ukrainian: Костянтин Юрійович Павлов; 12 January 1973-15 August 2021) was a Ukrainian politician who served as a People's Deputy of Ukraine in the Verkhovna Rada representing the 7th and 8th convocations from 2012 to 2019 and was also the Mayor of Kryvyi Rih from 2020 until his death in 2021. Pavlov first entered politics in 2005 when he joined the Party of Regions, and then experienced a rapid ascent locally in Kryvyi Rih, becoming deputy mayor and a deputy to the Dnipropetrovsk Oblast Council in little under a year before joining parliament in 2012. He left the Party of Regions in 2014, and thereafter joined the Opposition Bloc and later the Opposition Platform - For Life. He was found dead in his home on 15 August 2021, which led to theories of both murder and suicide, although in September the police ruled out the murder version but did not explain why he committed suicide.

== Early life ==
Pavlov was born on 12 January 1973 in the city of Kryvyi Rih, which was then part of the Ukrainian SSR in the Soviet Union. Both of his parents were from the city, with his father working at the enterprise "Kryvbasrud" and his mother working as a cashier at a local post office. After graduating from secondary school, he decided to pursue higher education, and in 1992, he graduated from the Kryvyi Rih Polytechnic College with a qualification as an electrician. Upon graduating, he worked as an electrician of the 4th category at a quarry of the Southern Mining and Processing Plant, which is based in Kryvyi Rih also. After four years, he moved to the enterprise "Kryvbasconsulting" in 1996 as its deputy director. This came sometime after he graduated from the Interregional Academy of Personnel Management with a specialisation as an economist. He also graduated from the Open University of Great Britain with a degree in organisation management.

In 1998, he was promoted to becoming director of Kryvbasconsulting, although he left after only a year to return to the Southern Mining and Processing Plant when he was appointed Deputy Head of the Department of Sales and Foreign Economic Activity there. In 2002, he then moved to the Kryvyi Rih Surykov Plant to become deputy director there. The plant produces Iron(III) oxide and talc. He was eventually promoted to director, which is where he spent the rest of his career as a businessman before entering politics.

== Political career ==
=== Early career ===
In 2005, Pavlov joined the Party of Regions, shortly after the party gained significant strength. A year later, he was already appointed Deputy Mayor of Kryvyi Rih by the then-longtime mayor Yuriy Lyubonenko. Simultaneously, a few months later, he was elected to the regional Dnipropetrovsk Oblast Council as a deputy for a term. Some local outlets reported that this rapid rise in politics was because of his association with Rinat Akhmetov in the 1990s over another oligarch, Ihor Kolomoyskyi. During his mandate in the oblast council, he became head of the Party of Regions branch for Kryvyi Rih, and he was re-elected to the oblast council in 2010 for another term.

=== Verkhovna Rada (2012-2019) ===
During the 2012 Ukrainian parliamentary elections, Pavlov announced his candidacy for constituency No. 31 (Dnipropetrovsk Oblast). He was elected with 43.37% of the vote against his main rival, Batkivshchyna candidate Vira Vernyhor, who won 22.69% of the vote. Third place went to Pavlov Lytvynenko, a member of the Communist Party of Ukraine, who won 16.73% of the vote. Upon joining the Rada, he joined the faction of the Party of Regions and became a member of the Committee on the Budget. During his time in the 7th convocation, he voted with the party line for the so-called "laws on dictatorship". However, after Viktor Yanukovych left for Russia, Pavlov wrote a letter of resignation from the Party of Regions, although reportedly the letter went missing and he wasn't expelled, remaining the local head of the party up to October 2014. Due to this, Pavlov sued the party, saying that it caused emotional distress and that a retraction needed to be published by the party. A court gave the claim of letting him leave the party via correction, but denied giving his request of a public retraction from the party.

After this, Pavlov chose to re-run in constituency No. 31 during the snap 2014 Ukrainian parliamentary elections as a self-nominated, non-partisan candidate. He was one of fifteen other candidates to register in the race. In late October, it was announced that he had obtained 33.57% of the vote in the constituency, with the opposition candidate, Vitaliy Oliynyk, winning 26.15%. With all the votes counted, he was re-elected with 33.36% of the vote. Pavlov's second campaign mainly focused on the environmental problems in Kryvyi Rih and affordable medical care there. Upon joining the Rada for a second time, he joined the Opposition Bloc faction and became Chairman of the Subcommittee on Budgetary Support for Regional Development. During his first year there, he submitted only 10 bills, mostly related to tariffs on housing and services and state assistance. In 2018, he was controversially one of just 36 deputies to vote against the Law on the Recognition of Ukrainian Sovereignty over the Occupied Territories of Donetsk and Luhansk (due to the War in the Donbas). He was also one of 59 deputies who signed a petition to abolish the article of the Criminal Code of Ukraine on illegal enrichment, which was required for Ukraine to enter the European Union and was an obligation to the IMF. In 2019, he then attempted to run in constituency No. 31 as an independent candidate but affiliated with the Opposition Bloc. He was not selected.

=== Mayor of Kryvyi Rih ===
Pavlov entered the race for Mayor of Kryvyi Rih early as a member of the Opposition Platform - For Life party and as the adviser to Yuriy Vilkul, who was serving as mayor prior. During the first-round voting for the mayoral race, Pavlov said to vote for him or Vilkul, but it was reported by Deutsche Welle that Pavlov was initially not expected to advance past the first round. When first-round voting was held in October 2020, Vilkul led the race with nearly 45%, with opposition candidate from the Servant of the People, Dmytro Shevchyk, winning 25.94%. Pavlov placed third with either 8.6% or 9.15%. After first-round voting, electoral blocs were formed within the Kryvyi Rih City Council, with "Ukrainian Perspective" under Vilkul earning 19 seats, Servant of the People 16 seats, and the Opposition Platform 9 seats.

Between the time of the first and second round, Shevchyk sued multiple times in the courts, but lost most of them, leading to a delay in the runoff election. Meanwhile, Vilkul withdrew from the race despite leading the first round due to health problems, and said that voters who backed him should vote for Pavlov. In the weeks after, numerous billboards appeared in Kryvyi Rih reading "Vilkul for Pavlov", and the campaign promised free public transport and more social payments (from 500 to 1,500 hryvnias), while also using the previous administration's achievements as proof. Oleksandr Vilkul, Vilkul's son, led Pavlov's campaign staff, which led to Pavlov being called "Vilkuls' man" in the press. In the midst of this, a local activist sued Pavlov over the 1,500 hryvnias promise and said this amounted to bribery and that the campaign could not actually finance it, with OPORA also saying that Pavlov's campaign used his position as adviser to strengthen his candidacy prior. Pavlov did not take part in debates, but neither did Shevchyk, although he extensively spoke with journalists from First City and Rudana TV, while Shevchyk said he was denied the right to comment.

The second round was held on 6 December 2020. The turnout was far lower at 35%, with OPORA saying they found no violations capable of significantly impacting the results, although local law enforcement did log reports of electoral violations. Exit polls generally came from media that supported either candidate, with Pavlov citing 58.86% for him against 41.14% for Shevchyk, while another foundation gave Shevchyk the lead at 51.7% against 47.2% for Pavlov. On the morning of 7 December, the Opposition Platform claimed that Pavlov had won with 58.5% of the vote, and it was also alleged that Russian media had known the results before they were even published. Either way, the election commission later that day announced Pavlov had won with 56.97% of the vote to Shevchyk's 40.49%. In the aftermath, BBC Ukraine said the loss for the Servant of the People Candidate was big, since it was the party's last chance to win in a major city, especially since it was Zelenskyy's hometown. However, this was the only major industrial city said to be won by the Opposition Platform also. Also, it was reported that many pro-Ukrainian voters had deliberately not voted, leading to a low turnout because of some perception that Shevchyk was not that different from Pavlov, and that Shevchyk also came from the Party of Regions.

In the nine months, Pavlov would then hold the office before his death, a coalition was formed between Ukrainian Perspective and the Opposition Platform, consisting of 28 of the 54 city deputies. European Solidarity was also later reported to have joined the coalition, although Servant of the People and the bloc of Syla Liudei remained in opposition. Oleksandr Kotliar was nominated for council secretary to Pavlov, and although he was part of the Servant of the People Party, he was widely reported to be pro-Vilkul either way. In retrospective analysis, media outlets said Pavlov spent the next few months mainly continuing what Vilkul had done in office, with some even accusing Vilkul of actually running the city while Pavlov was the ceremonial mayor.

== Personal life ==
Pavlov was married to a woman known as Elena, and together they had a son, Yuri, who was born in 1994. On 25 December 2018, Kostiantyn was put on a sanctions list by Russia.

Kostiantyn's younger brother, Andriy, was found dead two months after Kostiantyn, in October 2021. Andriy was a foreman at ArcelorMittal, and no visible signs of distress were found on his body. It was also reported that he had complained of health problems prior to his death. A month later, Kostiantyn's cousin, Boris, was also found dead in his apartment due to hanging. It was also reported that Boris had suffered from a severe illness prior to his death, with investigators confirming he had esophageal cancer and tuberculosis. Shortly after Boris's death, Kostiantyn's widow, Elena, told the media outlet Ukrainska Pravda that after all three deaths - Kostiantyn, Boris, and Andriy - in quick succession, she and her son Yuri did not have any fatal diseases and were not suicidal.

=== Death ===
The Central Cemtery in Kryvyi Rih in 2023, where he was buried near Hryhoriy Gutovsky on 19 August 2021.

On 15 August 2021, Pavlov was found dead with a gunshot wound at his house in Vilne, a small village on the outskirts of Kryvyi Rih. It was later estimated that he had died in the early hours of about 06:00-07:00 on 15 August after he returned home from vacation with his family a day earlier, with his wife remaining on vacation at the seaside at the time of his death. His body was found after he had not responded to his wife, leading Pavlov's assistant to check on him and find the gates to his house locked, so the assistant called Pavlov's adviser, Andrii Halchenko, and the Police of Ukraine at 16:00. The police arrived at the house with Halchenko, and found Pavlov either on the veranda of the house, on the terrace, or at the threshold of his house. Halchenko would find his body soon after near an open door with a shotgun by him and covered in blood, with Halchenko theorising that someone had shot him at the door when he opened it. Nearly all the sources differentiated on the weapon and wound: some say Pavlov had a single gunshot wound to the chest, others say it was to the head; the weapon used was said to be either a MKM 072 SB (produced by Mayak), a Fort-202 hunting carbine (produced by RPC Fort) that he had registered, or a Saiga rifle. However, they did agree that the rifle was one Pavlov owned, as police said Pavlov owned multiple firearms, mostly for hunting.

After finding him dead, the Kryvyi Rih Raion police, police chief Anatolii Shchadylo, a local forensics team, and a team from the National Police of Ukraine who traveled from Kyiv investigated his death. Two versions were mainly brought forth: that Pavlov had committed suicide, which the police under Artem Sehvchenko agreed with, or that it was premeditated murder, and it was unclear if it was either. On 16 August, police confirmed they had obtained video surveillance from inside and outside the house, but that there were no people in the recording. The video was later leaked online in clips through Telegram, but it did not show the shot itself. Another Telegram channel, Reporter.ua, said they had obtained additional clips showing a man who was presumed to be Pavlov walking with the gun, with the channel claiming he had killed himself by firing the weapon at his chest. The police did not comment on the authenticity of any of the clips, and said they did not know how the clips got online. Later that day, it was confirmed they were considering three versions: murder, suicide, careless handling of a weapon, although they said they would also possibly consider incitement to suicide. Throughout the following month and into September, multiple searches were conducted in Kryvyi Rih against people who might have information about Pavlov's death, with multiple items being seized. Some of the reported people who were said to have been searched were the deputy mayors Oleksandr Katrychenko and Yevhen Udod, Kryvyi Rih councillor Viktoriia Tretiak, and acting mayor Yuriy Vilkul. By early September, the police said they had ruled out murder, and that the main versions were now all related to suicide but they did not know the motive.

==== Reactions ====
Pavlov's party, the Opposition Platform – For Life, said in a statement that they believed that he had been murdered and blamed the ruling authorities for his death, with another fellow MP, Nestor Shufrych, also saying he did not believe it was suicide. Another MP and then co-chair of his party, Vadim Rabinovich, also said the suicide version was an obvious lie. Locally, the acting mayor, Yuriy Vilkul, said Pavlov had been in a "good, working mood" prior, but did not comment on the cause of death, although his son Oleksandr did and said that he also did not believe it was a suicide. Another local councillor said the news that the city discussed the reasons, but that there was no truth to most allegations. Pavlov's family declined to comment publicly. President Volodymyr Zelensky, a native of Kryvyi Rih, also expressed his condolences and said he would keep the case going and obtain regular reports.

==== Burial ====
Pavlov's funeral was held on 19 August 2021 in Kryvyi Rih, with an estimated 70,000 people coming to see him off prior at the Kryvyi Rih Drama Theatre named after Taras Shevchenko. A number of politicians were present at the funeral, both from his party and other local ones, alongside his surviving wife and son. He was then transported to the St. Nicholas Church for a prviate service by Bishop Ephraim, the Metropolitan of Kryvyi Rih and Nikopol,before he was put to rest and buried at the Central Cemetery of Kryvyi Rih. Pavlov was buried near another politician and fellow longtime Mayor of Kryvyi Rih, Hryhoriy Gutovsky.

== Honours and awards ==
Pavlov was awarded the following honours:

- Certificate of Honour of the Verkhovna Rada of Ukraine
- Badge "For the Development of the Region"
- Badge "For Merit to the City" (Kryvyi Rih)
