= Liubomyrivka, Kazanka settlement hromada, Bashtanka Raion, Mykolaiv Oblast =

Rural settlement in Mykolaiv Oblast, Ukraine

Liubomyrivka Любомирівка
- Rural settlement
- Location of Liubomyrivka Liubomyrivka (Ukraine)
- Coordinates: 47°51′24″N 32°41′56″E
- Country: Ukraine
- Oblast: Mykolaiv Oblast
- Raion: Bashtanka Raion
- Hromada: Kazanka settlement hromada
- Elevation: 112 m (367 ft)

Population (2001)
  - Total: 72
- Postal code: 56030
- Area code: +380 5164
- Climate: Cfa

Liubomyrivka (Ukrainian: Любомирівка) is a rural settlement in Bashtanka Raion, Mykolaiv Oblast, Ukraine. It belongs to Kazanka settlement hromada, one of the hromadas of Ukraine.

Until 18 July 2020, Liubomyrivka was located in Kazanka Raion. The raion was abolished in July 2020 as a part of the administrative reform of Ukraine, which reduced the number of raions of Mykolaiv Oblast to four. The area of Kazanka Raion was merged into Bashtanka Raion.
