= Tsentralno-Miskyi District =

Tsentralno-Miskyi District may refer to:

- Tsentralno-Miskyi District, Horlivka, Ukraine
- Tsentralno-Miskyi District, Kryvyi Rih, Ukraine
- Tsentralno-Miskyi District, Makiivka, Ukraine
