= Nashi (Ukraine) =

Nashi Наші
- Chairman: Yevheniy Murayev
- Founded: 19 February 2015
- Banned: 14 June 2022
- Split from: For Life
- Headquarters: Kharkiv
- Ideology: Social conservatism
- Political position: Syncretic
- National affiliation: Opposition Bloc (2019)
- Colours
- Slogan: Our time has come! (Russian: «Наше время пришло!») (Ukrainian: «Наш час настав!»)

Party flag
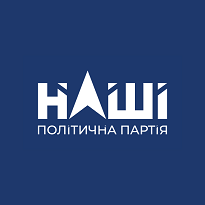

Website
- nashi.ua

Nashi (Ukrainian: Політична партія «НАШI»), translated as Ours, was a political party in Ukraine registered February 2015. Since 2018, the party has been led by Yevheniy Murayev. On 14 June 2022 the party was banned by a court order.

== History ==
In September 2018, former co-chairman of For Life Yevheniy Murayev reconstituted the party under its current name Nashi.

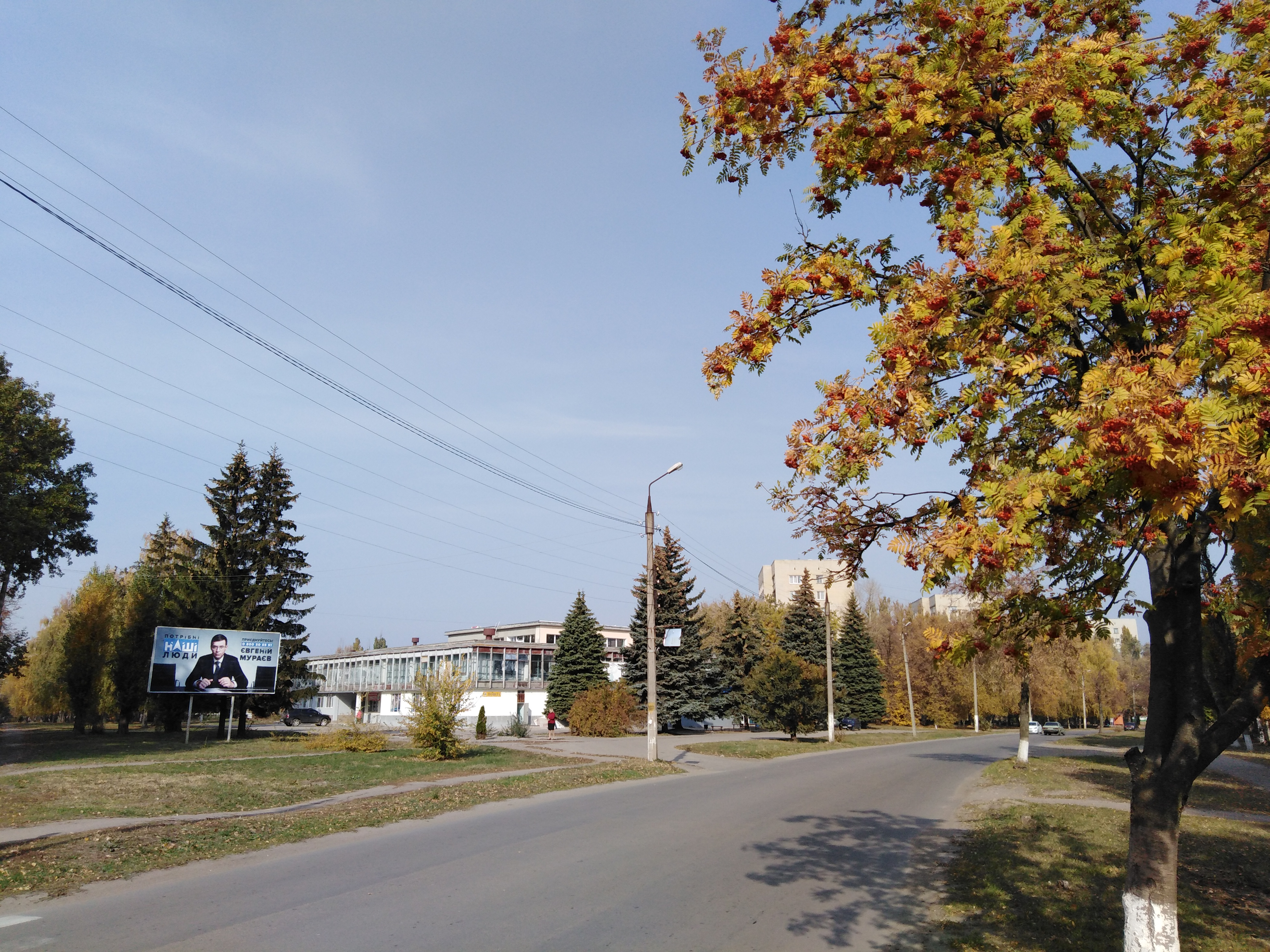
A billboard with an advertisement for the Nashi party and Muraev's image. Kharkiv Oblast, Pervomaiskyi, Oktiabrska street, October 2018.

On 10 January 2019, the party elected party leader Murayev as their candidate in the 2019 Ukrainian presidential election. On 7 March 2019, Muraev pulled out of the election in favor of Oleksandr Vilkul. He also announced that Vilkul's party Opposition Bloc — Party for Peace and Development and Nashi would soon merge. Indeed, in the 2019 Ukrainian parliamentary election the party joined a united party list with the political parties of Opposition Bloc — Party for Peace and Development, Revival and Trust Deeds. In this election this list won six single-seat constituencies and its nationwide list won 3.23% of the votes meaning it did not overcome the 5% election barrier.

In 2020, the political party participated in local elections as part of regional electoral blocs (Kernes Bloc — Successful Kharkiv, Trust Deeds, etc.). Operating under its own name the party won 6 seats. In the Yuzhnenskoy city territorial community, the political party won three seats.

In the fall of 2021, Yevgeny Muraev presented the New Country Formula on the NASH party TV channel.

In January 2022, the British government accused Russia of seeking to supplant Ukraine's government via military force, and replace it with a pro-Russian administration possibly led by Murayev. British Foreign Minister Liz Truss wrote on Twitter that the UK "will not tolerate Kremlin plot to install pro-Russian leadership in Ukraine." Murayev denied any such plan. Yevhen Murayev rejected the statement since he is under Russian sanctions. Russia dismissed the accusation as "misinformation". The Russian Foreign Ministry said the British accusation was "evidence that it is the NATO countries, led by the Anglo-Saxons, that are escalating tensions around Ukraine." Volodymyr Fesenko, a Ukrainian political analyst, wrote that "Murayev, for all his pro-Russianness, is not a figure who is very close to the Kremlin, especially compared to (Viktor) Medvedchuk." (Note: In January 2022, the United States intelligence community named Viktor Medvedchuk as a possible Kremlin supported choice to lead a pro Russia puppet Ukrainian government and, in February 2022, the United States intelligence community named Oleg Tsaryov as another possible Kremlin supported choice to lead a pro Russia puppet Ukrainian government.)

During the Russian military invasion of Ukraine, a number of functionaries of the Nashi party cooperated with the Russian troops and headed the military-civilian administrations in the territories occupied by the Russians.

On 20 March 2022 Nashi was one of several political parties suspended by the National Security and Defense Council of Ukraine during the 2022 Russian invasion of Ukraine, along with Derzhava, Left Opposition, Opposition Bloc, Opposition Platform — For Life, Party of Shariy, Progressive Socialist Party of Ukraine, Socialist Party of Ukraine, Union of Leftists, and the Volodymyr Saldo Bloc.

On 14 June 2022 the Eighth Administrative Court of Appeal banned Nashi. The property of the party and all its branches were transferred to the state. (Of all the parties suspended on 20 March 2022 only the Progressive Socialist Party of Ukraine and Opposition Platform — For Life actively opposed its banning.)

== Ideology ==
The party declares adherence to the neutral and non-bloc status of Ukraine; respect for history, concern for the development of culture and native language; country's reindustrialization policy; broad decentralization and cultural autonomy of all regions of Ukraine.

According to Ukrainian journalists and political scientists, Nashi is one of the many pro-Russian parties (Opposition Bloc, Opposition Platform – For Life, etc.) formed from the wreckage of the now-defunct Party of Regions.

Some see the star motif in the party's logo as redolent of the Soviet (or Kremlin's) red star.

The party has a pro-Russian stance.

== Leadership ==
The party is headed by deputies of VII and VIII convocations. Yevheniy Murayev and Olexander Dolzhenkov, which were previously part of the party "For Life" and "Party of Regions".

== Rating ==
In a November 2018 "RATING" opinion poll the party scored 4.9%.

According to a study by Active Group, in February 2022, the rating of the Nashi party was 4.9% and according to the Kyiv International Institute of Sociology, the party’s rating from October 2021 to February 2022 ranged from 4.1 to 5.7%. At the same time, the rating of its leader Yevheniy Murayev in many polls was equal to his main opponent Yuriy Boyko.

Many analysts believed that the rise in the party’s electoral rating is directly related to the activities of the NASH TV channel, created in 2018, which was closed in February 2022 due to the sanctions imposed by the National Security and Defense Council of Ukraine.

== See also ==
- NASH (Ukrainian TV channel)
- Nashi (1990s nationalist group)
- Nashi (youth movement)
