= Kazanka, Ukraine =

Rural locality in Mykolaiv Oblast, Ukraine

Kazanka Казанка
- Rural settlement
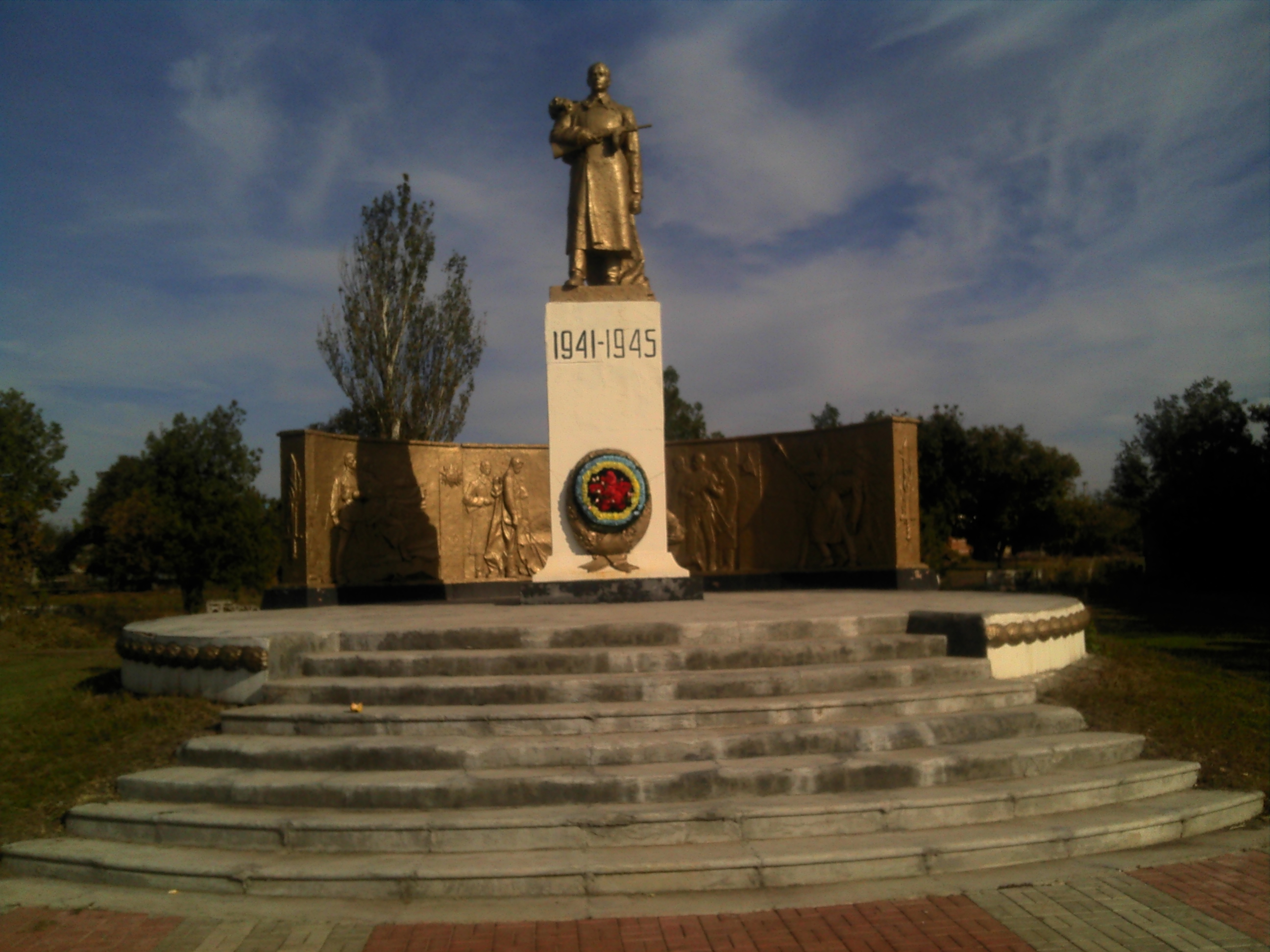

- Location of Kazanka Kazanka (Mykolaiv Oblast)
- Coordinates: 47°50′17″N 32°49′34″E
- Country: Ukraine
- Oblast: Mykolaiv Oblast
- Raion: Bashtanka Raion
- Hromada: Kazanka settlement hromada

Population (2022)
  - Total: 6,523
- Time zone: UTC+2 (EET)
  - Summer (DST): UTC+3 (EEST)

Kazanka (Ukrainian: Казанка, Russian: Казанка) is a rural settlement in Bashtanka Raion in the northeast of Mykolaiv Oblast, Ukraine. It host the administration of Kazanka settlement hromada, one of the hromadas of Ukraine. Population: 6,523 (2022 estimate).

== Geography ==
The settlement is located on the banks of the Vysun, a right tributary of the Inhulets, in the basin of the Dnieper. Its territory lies in the bpundaries of Black Sea Lowland.

== History ==
In 1923, Kazanka Raion of Kryvyi Rih Okruha, with the administrative center in Kazanka, was established as part of Yekaterinoslav Governorate. In 1925, the governorates were abolished, and okruhas were directly subordinated to Ukrainian SSR. In 1930, okruhas were abolished, and on 27 February 1932, Dnipropetrovsk Oblast was established, and Kazanka Raion was included into Dnipropetrovsk Oblast. On 22 September 1937, Mykolaiv Oblast was established on lands which previously belonged to Dnipropetrovsk and Odesa Oblasts, and Kazanka Raion became part of newly created Mykolaiv Oblast. In 1967, Kazanka was granted urban-type settlement status.

On 18 July 2020, Kazanka Raion was abolished as part of the administrative reform of Ukraine, which reduced the number of raions of Mykolaiv Oblast to four. The area of Kazanka Raion was merged into Bashtanka Raion. On 26 January 2024, a new law entered into force which abolished the status of urban-type settlement status, and Kazanka became a rural settlement.

== Economy ==
=== Transportation ===
Kazanka railway station, on the railway line connecting Mykolaiv and Dolynska, is located 9 kilometres (5.6 mi) northwest of the settlement.
