= Udod =

Udod (Cyrillic: Удод) is a surname. Notable people with the surname include:

- Danylo Udod (born 2004), Ukrainian footballer
- Yevhen Udod (born 1973), Ukrainian politician
- Mykhaylo Udod (born 1997), Ukrainian footballer
