= Dnipropetrovsk Oblast Council =

Legislature of Dnipropetrovsk Oblast, Ukraine

Type
- Type: Unicameral
- Houses: 1

Leadership
- Chairman: Mykola Lukashuk, Servant of the People since 16 December 2020
- First Deputy chairman: Gennady Gufman, Opposition Platform — For Life since 16 December 2020

Structure
- Seats: 120
- Political groups: Government (74): Servant of the People (30); Opposition Platform — For Life (27); Proposition (17); Opposition (46): Bloc Vilkul — Ukrainian perspective (16); European Solidarity (13); Community Power (9); Batkivshchyna (8)

Elections
- Last election: 25 October 2020

Meeting place
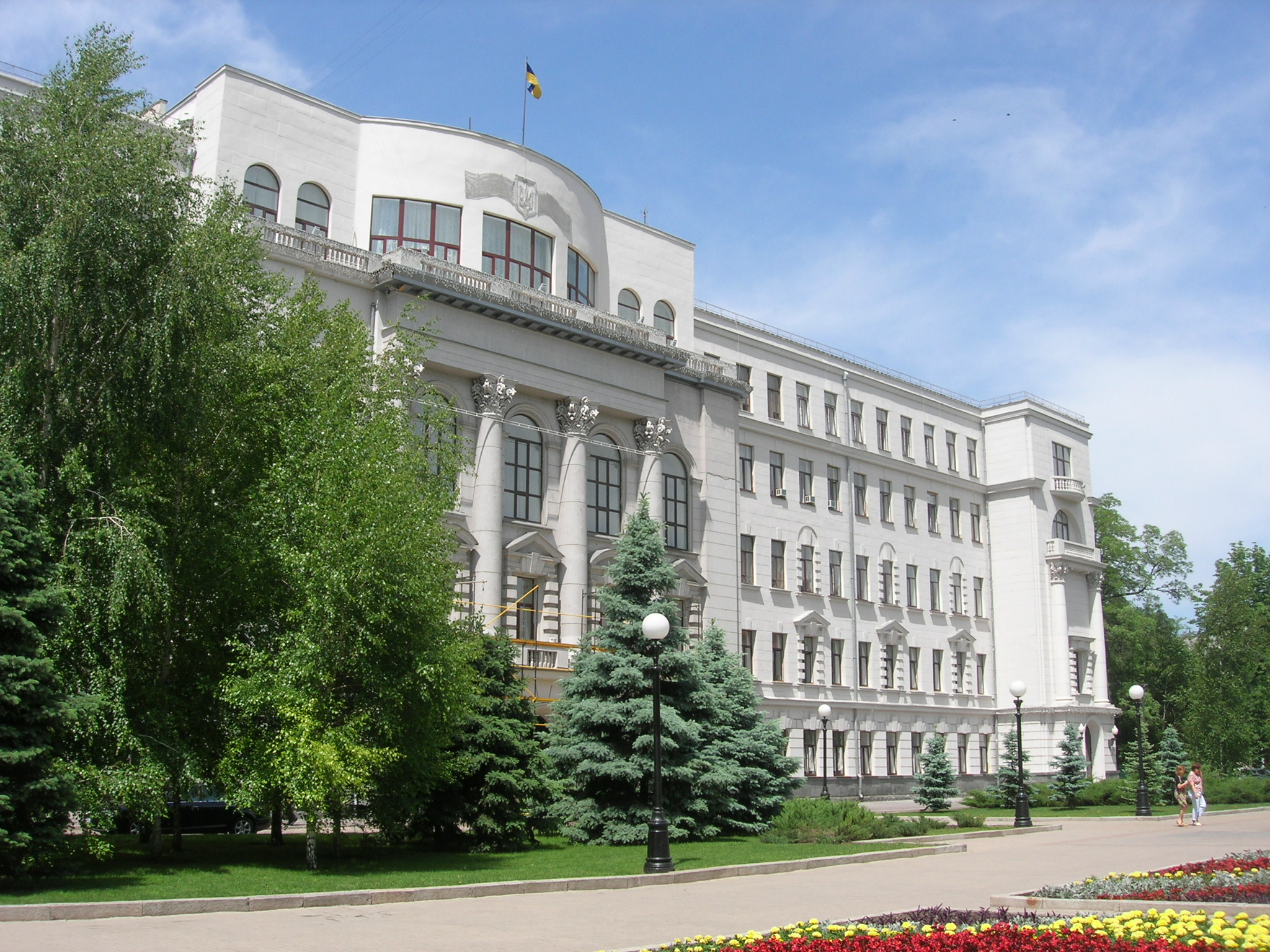
- Dnipro, Dnipropetrovsk Oblast

Website
- https://oblrada.dp.gov.ua

The Dnipropetrovsk Oblast Council (Ukrainian: Дніпропетровська обласна рада) is the regional oblast council (parliament) of the Dnipropetrovsk Oblast (province) located in eastern Ukraine.

Council members are elected for five year terms. In order to gain representation in the council, a party must gain more than 5 percent of the total vote.

== Recent elections ==
=== 2020 ===
Distribution of seats after the 2020 Ukrainian local elections

- 30 Servant of the People
- 27 Opposition Platform — For Life
- 17 Proposition
- 16 Bloc Vilkul — Ukrainian perspective
- 13 European Solidarity
- 9 Community Power
- 8 Fatherland

Election date was 25 October 2020

=== 2015 ===
Distribution of seats after the 2015 Ukrainian local elections

- 46 Opposition Bloc
- 25 UKROP
- 14 Solidarity
- 10 Revival
- 9 Fatherland
- 8 Radical Party
- 8 Self Reliance

Election date was 25 October 2015

=== 2010 ===
Distribution of seats after the 2010 Ukrainian local elections

- 92 Party of Regions
- 12 Strong Ukraine
- 11 Communist Party of Ukraine
- 7 Front for Change
- 4 Ukraine of the Future
- 2 People's Party
- 2 Hromada

=== 2006 ===
Distribution of seats after the 2006 Ukrainian local elections

- 39 Party of Regions
- 18 Yulia Tymoshenko Bloc
- 17 Pavlo Lazarenko Bloc
- 9 Our Ukraine
- 7 Communist Party of Ukraine
- 5 People's Opposition Bloc of Natalia Vitrenko
- 5 Lytvyn Bloc

== Chairmen ==
=== Regional executive committee ===
- Daniil Petrovsky (1932)
- Nikita Alekseev (1932–1933)
- Ivan Gavrilov (1933–1936)
- Ivan Fedyaev (1936–1937)
- Nikolay Nikitchenko (acting, 1937)
- Konstantin Karavaev (1938–1940)
- Pavel Naydenov (1940–1941, 1943–1944)
- Georgy Dementiev (1944–1947)
- Ivan Filipov (1947–1952)
- Nikolai Gavrilenko (1952–1954)
- Ivan Yunak (1954–1961)
- Nikolai Vasiliev (1961–1963)
- Nikolai Vasiliev (agrarian, 1963–1964)
- Ivan Yatsuba (industrial, 1963–1964)
- Mikhail Pashov (1964–1978)
- Viktor Boyko (1978–1983)
- Yuri Babich (1983–1989)
- Stanislav Stezhko (1989–1991)

=== Regional council ===
- 1990–1992 Mykola Zadoya
- 1992–1994 Viktor Bogatyr
- 1994–1998 Pavlo Lazarenko
- 1998–2002 Eduard Dubinin
- 2002–2004 Halyna Bulavka
- 2004–2006 Mykola Shvets
- 2006–2010 Yuriy Vilkul
- 2010–2015 Yevhen Udod
- 2015–2019 Glib Prygunov
- 2019–present Svyatoslav Oliynyk
