= Yevhen Udod =

Ukrainian politician

Yevhen Udod Євген Удод
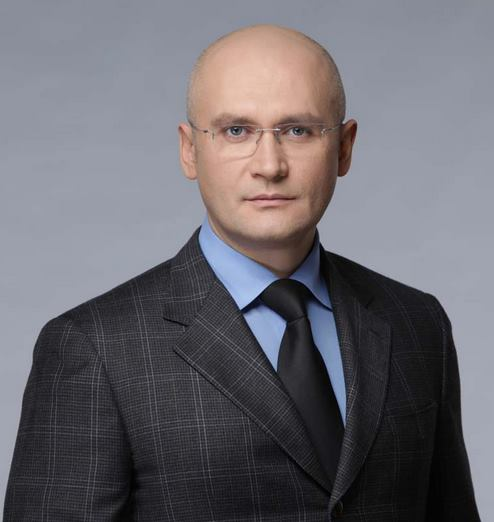

Chairman of Dnipropetrovsk Oblast Council
- In office June 3, 2010 – December 2015
- Preceded by: Yuriy Vilkul
- Succeeded by: Glib Prygunov

Personal details
- Born: Yevhen Hryhorovych Udod; 30 May 1973 (age 53) Krivyi Rih, Ukrainian SSR
- Party: Party of Regions
- Education: Kryvyi Rih National University
- Website: Official website

Yevhen Hryhorovych Udod (Ukrainian: Євген Григорович Удод; born May 30, 1973) is a former chairman of the Dnipropetrovsk Regional Council of Dnipropetrovsk Oblast.

== Biography ==
- 1994-1998 – Mechanic and Equipment Maintenance Assistant at the «Кrivbasruda», in Novokrivorozskiy state Coal Preparation Plant, Public Traded Company «Ingulets Mining Preparation Plant».
- 1998-2003 – «SMPP» (South Mining Preparation Plant). Initially was hired as Engineer at the Distribution Department. After that, filled a position of the Head of Cooperation with metallurgical plants department. Later Distribution Department Chief's Assistant.
- 2003-2006 – «CMPP» (Central Mining Preparation Plant) Director of Distribution and Marketing. Later – Executive Director.
- 2006-2009 – Executive Director of «NMPP» (North Mining Preparation Plant). Later Chief Director.
- 2006 – Deputy of the Dnipropetrovsk Regional Council V convocation. Head of the Committee of Building, Transport, Communication and Improvement of Public Services.
- 2009—2010 – Sales Director at the Mining Division «Меtinvest».
- Since June 2010 – Chairman of the Dnipropetrovsk Regional Council V convocation.
- From November 2010 - Chairman of the Dnipropetrovsk Regional Council VI convocation until he was succeeded by Glib Prygunov.
- In December 2021, Udod was suspected of abuse of power and threatening to kill. The court set him bail in the amount of UAH 1.13 million. According to the investigation, Yevhen, as the head of the Dnipro Regional Council, violated the procedure for the sale of municipal property in favor of a private company, which resulted in the regional budget losing UAH 9.7 million.

== Honors ==
- 2006 – was awarded "Honorary Certificate of Cabinet of Ministers of Ukraine"
- 2007 – was honorary entitled as "Merited Industrial worker of Ukraine"
