= Mayor of Kryvyi Rih =

The following is a list of mayors of the city of Kryvyi Rih, Ukraine. It includes positions equivalent to mayor, such as chairperson of the city council executive committee.

== Mayors ==
Name	Picture	Term of office		Elected	Political party
Pavel Kravets		1914	1917	Kryvyi Rih volost	Russian Empire
Arkady Umansky		1917	1917	Kryvyi Rih Council	Mensheviks
Pavel Richmedilo		1917	1917	Kryvyi Rih Council	USDP
Ivan Aleshchenko		1917	1917	Kryvyi Rih Council	RSDLP
Peter Gerutsky		1917	1918	Kryvyi Rih Council	RSDLP
S. T. Sklar		1918	1920	Kryvyi Rih Council	RSDLP
Nekrasov		1920	1921	Kryvyi Rih City Council	CPSU
Andrey Novikov		1921	1922	Kryvyi Rih City Council	CPSU
Ruther		1922	1923	Kryvyi Rih City Council	CPSU
Arsentyev		1923	1925	Kryvyi Rih City Council	CPSU
Rayushkin		1925	1928	Kryvyi Rih City Council	CPSU
Claudia Mikhno		1928	1928	Kryvyi Rih City Council	CPSU
Oleksienko		1928	1928	Kryvyi Rih City Council	CPSU
Glushko		1928	1931	Kryvyi Rih City Council	CPSU
Kaczynski		1931	1932	Kryvyi Rih City Council	CPSU
Jozef Shteyngbersky		1932	1933	Kryvyi Rih City Council	CPSU
Vasily Kiselev		1933	1934	Kryvyi Rih City Council	CPSU
Paul Chebukin		1934	1937	Kryvyi Rih City Council	CPSU
Nikolay Staszko		1937	1937	Kryvyi Rih City Council	CPSU
Vasily Kovalchuk		1937	1939	Kryvyi Rih City Council	CPSU
Leonid Fedorov		1939	1941	Kryvyi Rih City Council	CPSU
		1941	1944	German administration	
Leonid Fedorov		1944	1946	Kryvyi Rih City Council	CPSU
Petr Burlakov		1946	1948	Kryvyi Rih City Council	CPSU
Ivan Kudryavtsev		1948	1949	Kryvyi Rih City Council	CPSU
Fedor Kalinichenko		1949	1957	Kryvyi Rih City Council	CPSU
Alexander Moskalenko		1957	1959	Kryvyi Rih City Council	CPSU
Nikolay Perchin		1959	1969	Kryvyi Rih City Council	CPSU
Yuriy Babich		1970	1979	Kryvyi Rih City Council	CPSU
Grigory Hutovsky		1979	1992	Kryvyi Rih City Council	Communist Party
Yuriy Lubonenko		1992; 1994	2010	Kryvyi Rih City Council; Popular election	Party of Regions
Yuriy Vilkul		2010; 2021	2020 present	Popular election; Urgent secret election	Party of Regions/Opposition Bloc
† Kostiantyn Pavlov		2020	2021 (Died in office)	Popular election	Opposition Platform — For Life
Yuriy Vilkul (Acting)		2021	present	Internal election	Vilkul Bloc – Ukrainian Perspective
