= Chervoniy Girnik =

Newspaper in Ukraine

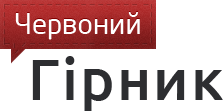
- Type: Daily newspaper
- Format: A3
- Owner(s): Kryvyi Rih City Council
- Founder(s): Kryvyi Rih City Council
- Editor: Olga Kaliniuk
- News editor: Mykola Kramanenko
- Photo editor: Andrii Trubitsyn
- Staff writers: 20
- Founded: 1924
- Political alignment: Pro-Russian
- Headquarters: Metalurhiv Ave 28; Kryvyi Rih, Ukraine
- Circulation: 55,325
- Price: ₴5
- Website: www.girnyk.com.ua

Chervoniy Girnik is a Kryvyi Rih municipal newspaper, published since from December 7, 1924, in Ukrainian. Edition appeared in Soviet times, survived a difficult adjustment period and the first years of Ukraine's independence, and now occupies a worthy place among print media of Kryvyi Rih. The newspaper covers the life of the city in its various dimensions: society, city life, news, sports, culture, prominent personalities of the city and more. The publication is twice a week - on Tuesday (reduced output volume 8 columns) and Thursday (complete edition - 32 pages).
