= Vysun =

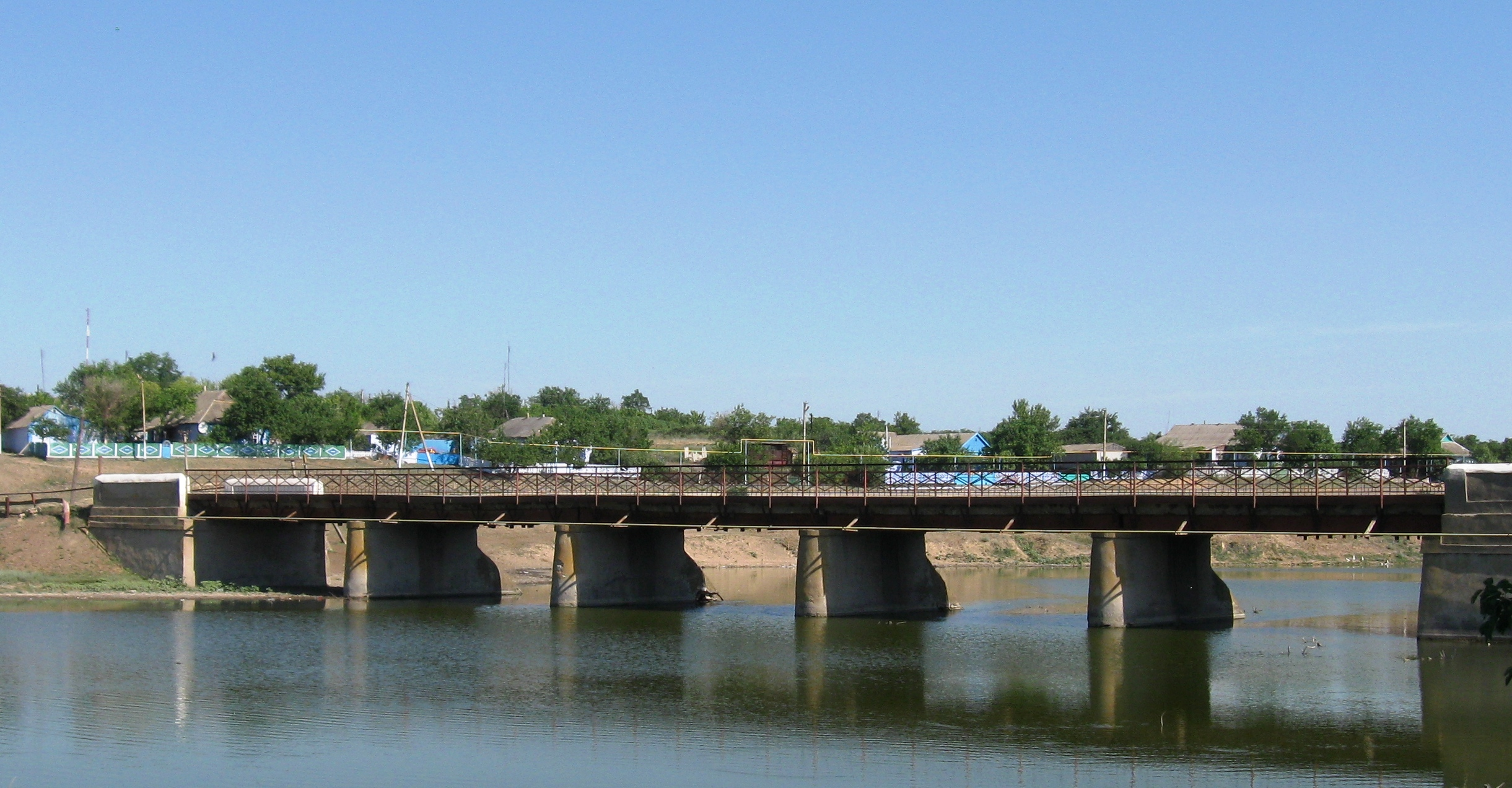
- The Vysun at Volodymyrivka

Location
- Country: Ukraine

Physical characteristics
- Mouth: Inhulets
  - coordinates: 47.1144°N 32.8959°E
- Length: 201 km (125 mi)
- Basin size: 2,670 km^{2} (1,030 sq mi)

Basin features
- Progression: Inhulets→ Dnieper→ Dnieper–Bug estuary→ Black Sea

The Vysun, Vulsun or Isun (Ukrainian: Висунь) is a river of Ukraine, flowing through the Mykolaiv Oblast. It is a right tributary of the Inhulets. It has a length of 201 km and begins in the Dnieper Upland and flows south through Prychornomorskoy Lowland, through the district center of Kazanka. It covers a basin of 2670 km^{2}. During season it is powered mainly by snowmelt.
