= Glib Prygunov =

Ukrainian politician

Glib Prygunov Гліб Пригунов
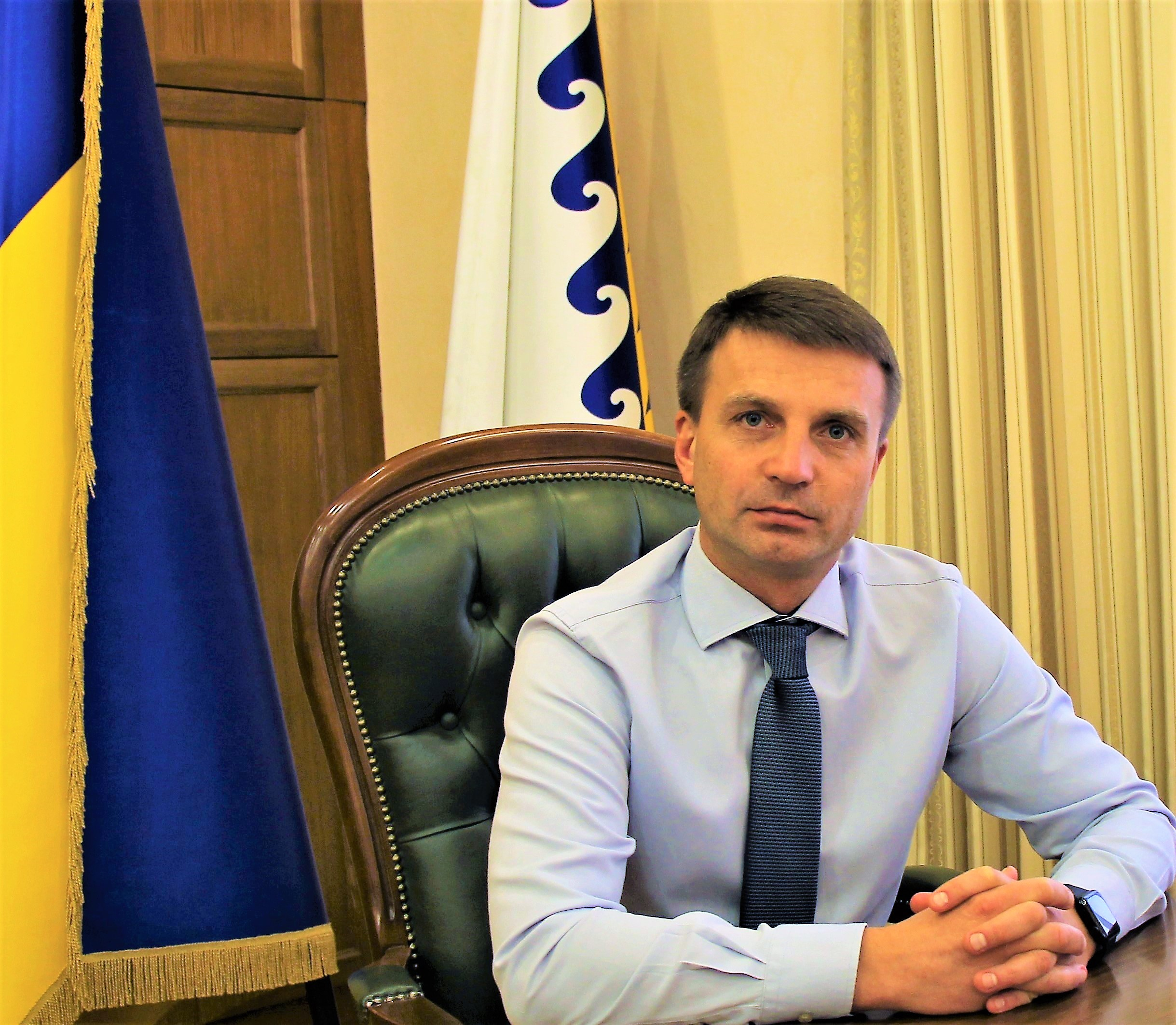

Chairman of Dnipropetrovsk Oblast Council
- In office 16 December 2015 – 8 November 2019
- Preceded by: Yevhen Udod
- Succeeded by: Svyatoslav Oliynyk

Personal details
- Born: 17 July 1974 (age 52) Dnipro, Ukrainian SSR
- Party: Petro Poroshenko Bloc "Solidarity"
- Education: Dnipropetrovsk State Medical Academy

Glib Oleksandrovych Prygunov (Ukrainian: Гліб Олександрович Пригунов) (born on July 17, 1974, Dnipropetrovsk, Ukraine) is a Ukrainian politician, statesman, and former chairman of the Dnipropetrovsk Oblast Council.

== Biography ==
Prygunov was born on July 17, 1974, in Dnipropetrovsk.

- 1991 — finished secondary school No. 23 in Dnipropetrovsk. While studying he worked as a hospital attendant at Regional Hospital after Mechnykov.
- 1997 — graduated from Dnipropetrovsk Medical Academy, with the specialty of children's surgeon.
- From September 2002 to February 2004 he studied at Dnipropetrovsk Regional institute of State Administration of the National Academy for Public Administration under the President of Ukraine, specialty "State Administration", Master of Public Administration.

== Career ==
- 1989 — 1990 — medical orderly in Polyclinic of the Regional Clinical Hospital named after Mechnykov.
- 1990 — 1991 — sanitary of the Regional Clinical Hospital named after Mechnykov.
- From August 1997 to September 2005 he worked in the Dnipropetrovsk Regional Children's Clinical Hospital as a doctor-intern and surgeon.
- 2002 — headed the city organization of the Reforms and Order Party, in the same year he became a deputy of the Kirov district council in the city of Dnipropetrovsk.
- 2004 — he was a participant in the Orange Revolution, a member of the headquarters of the president of Ukraine Viktor Yushchenko.
- 2005 — he entered the political council of the Political Party "People's Union "Our Ukraine"".
- In 2005 he became a member of political council of political party People's Unit "Our Ukraine (political party)".
- From 2005 to 2010 — Head of the Department of Internal Policy of the Governor of Dnipropetrovsk Oblast.
- Since 2010, Deputy Chairman of the Dnipropetrovsk Regional Organization of the Front for Change party.
- 2010 — he was elected as a deputy of the Dnipropetrovsk Regional Council on the list of the Front for Change party, the head of the faction in the regional council.
- During the Euromaidan 2013, he was the only deputy of the regional council, which in the center of Dnipropetrovsk opened a reception center for legal and other assistance to the participants of the protest.
- 2014 — After Poroshenko's victory in the presidential election, he was headed the Regional Office of the Presidential Party, became the head of the Secretariat of the Dnipropetrovsk Regional Organization of the Poroshenko's Block party.
- October — December 2015 — Deputy Chairman of the Governor of Dnipropetrovsk Oblast.
- In October 2015, he was elected a deputy of the Dnipropetrovsk Regional Council VII convocation.
- December 16, 2015 at the first session of the VII convocation, Glib Prygunov was elected Chairman of the Dnipropetrovsk Regional Council.
- On November 5, 2019, he resigned from the post of Chairman of the Dnipropetrovsk Regional Council as a result of the unification of the fraction opposition block and representatives of the Servant of the People party after the victory of Zelensky in the presidential election.

== As Chairman of the Regional Council ==
For stays of Prygunov in positions in the region, repair of roads and waterways took place, earned the first cooperative elevator in Ukraine.

When Prygunov stayed in power, the regional council allocated funds for the repair of the Surgical Corps of the Children's Hospital named after Rudnev and construction of a new ambulatory, the financing of the regional children's hospital was increased, the project "Help is coming" implemented.

The stadium was renovated in Mezhova and build a new stadium in Petrykivka.

Prygunov supported the Ethno Festival "Petrikivsky Dyvosvіt". At the time of his stay in office, the Cossack songs of Dnipropetrovsk were listed in the UNESCO Intangible Cultural Heritage Lists.

When Prygunov staying in power, the Dniprovsky Theater named after T. Shevchenko assigned the status of the National.

In 2017, a new diocesan temple of the Ukrainian Orthodox Church was opened.

Prygunov initiated the establishment of the premium for talented and active young people.

The working visit took place of the Ukrainian delegation led by Prygunov in Brazil, which provided for the establishment of bilateral Ukrainian-Brazilian cooperation.

Prygunov supported environmental initiatives: trees landing, energy efficiency contests and energy saving, the introduction of energizing and energy saving projects.

During his stay in power, the German Society of International Cooperation (GIZ) presented a project for resetting an excess of mine waters of the Kryvbas.

== Social activity ==
In 2010, he created and headed the public organization "Foundation for the Transformation of the Company "Universum"".

From the first days of Maidan 2013 supported the protesters, participated in the confrontation between demonstrators with security forces in Kyiv and Dnipropetrovsk.

Founder of the first All-Ukrainian Theater Festival.

== Charity ==
With the support of Prygunov, a hospice was created in the Dnipropetrovsk region.

In 2017, Glib Prygunov opened a memorable sign of those who died in Russo-Ukrainian War.

In 2017, as part of the action "Rainbow friendship", children from the front-line territories of the Donetsk region were transferred toys, books, sports inventory. Also humanitarian aid received residents of Avdiivka. Prygunov implemented the project "Help is coming", which provides the possibility of residents of the front-line territories to undergo treatment in medical institutions of the Dnipropetrovsk region.

In 2017, Prygunov called residents of Dnipropetrovsk to support the construction of the Temple of the Cathedral of the Intercession of the Most Holy Virgin UOC-KP.

Prygunov supported donor blood donation action.

== Family ==
Has 2 daughters and son.

== Awards ==
- In 2010 he was awarded the Order of Danylo Halytsky 2010.
- Order of the St Nicholas the Wonderworker 2016
- «The Merit to the Military Power of Ukraine» 2017
- The Order of St Volodymyr the Great, Equal- to- the-Apostles Knight of the 3rd power 2017
- The Order of St Volodymyr the Great, Equal- to- the-Apostles Knight of the 2nd power 2017
- The Order of Honor pin of the Ministry of Defence (Ukraine) 2018
- Medal, Joint Forces Campaign, for heroism and fealty, 2018
