= NASH (Ukrainian TV channel) =

Ukrainian pro-Russian TV channel, 2018–2022

- Country: Ukraine
- Headquarters: Kyiv, Zhilyanska street, 101-A

Programming
- Languages: Ukrainian, Russian
- Picture format: 16:9 (SDTV); 1080i (HDTV)

Ownership
- Owner: Yevhen Murayev

History
- Launched: November 19, 2018
- Closed: February 11, 2022 (TV broadcast); February 24, 2022 (Internet broadcasting)
- Former names: Maxxi TV

Links
- Website: nash.live

NASH (Ukrainian: НАШ) was a pro-Russian news and political TV channel in Ukraine owned by pro-Russian politician Yevhen Murayev (Opposition Bloc and Nashi parties).

The TV channel's broadcasting was blocked by the decision of the National Security and Defense Council of Ukraine on February 11, 2022, by imposing sanctions for a period of 5 years against Nasha Praha LLC, Nash 24 LLC, and Nash 365 LLC.

== History ==
It began test broadcasting on November 7, 2018, and full-fledged broadcasting on November 19, 2018, on the basis of the women's channel Maxxi TV.

Channel team: Tigran Martirosyan - head of the TV channel (headed the TV channel until November 2019, moved to the TV channel "Ukraine 24"), Roksolana Zavinskaya - editor-in-chief (worked from the beginning of the foundation of the TV channel until January 2020, moved to the TV channel "Ukraine 24", works editor-in-chief of Tigran Martirosyan's author's projects) Evgeniy Dudnik - general producer (worked until 2021), Anastasia Mitnitskaya - executive producer (worked until January 2020, moved to the Ukraine 24 TV channel, works as an executive producer of Tigran Martirosyan's author's projects), Elena Rudik - CEO.

On October 30, 2019, the TV channel received a license for satellite broadcasting, registered to a new legal entity - the Nash 365 company.

In March 2020, the channel, citing the coronavirus epidemic, stopped broadcasting live, instead broadcasting reruns of old programs.

After the introduction of sanctions against the TV channels “112 Ukraine”, “NewsOne” and “ZIK” in February 2021, NASH became the largest pro-Russian information television channel in Ukraine.

On April 14, 2021, a new TV channel began broadcasting under the “Maxxi TV” logo, but the channel broadcast programs from the “NASH” channel with a delay of 5–6 seconds. Due to the rebroadcast on May 13, 2021, the National Council ordered an inspection of Maxxi TV.

In July 2021, political strategist Vladimir Granovsky, who had previously worked for Viktor Yanukovych, became the head and then co-owner of the TV channel.

On January 6, 2022, blogger and social activist Sergei Sternenko created a petition “On the application of sanctions against the NASH TV channel, which disseminates Russian propaganda” on the website of the Official Internet Representation of the President of Ukraine. According to the author of the petition, the channel “regularly broadcasts anti-state statements and propaganda in the interests of the aggressor state”.

On February 2 of the same year, several hundred people led by Sternenko held a protest rally near the building of the Nash TV channel. Protesters demanded sanctions against this TV channel and its owner.

On February 11, 2022, in Kharkiv, during a visiting meeting of the National Security and Defense Council of Ukraine, the NASH TV channel held an anti-government rally against the possible closure of the TV channel, which Ukrainian far-right activists tried to disrupt. Based on the results of the meeting of the National Security and Defense Council of Ukraine, it was decided to impose sanctions against the NASH TV channel for a period of 5 years.

After the blocking of the NASH TV channel, it continued broadcasting in the Internet format on its YouTube channel.

On February 24, 2022, due to the beginning of the Russian Invasion of Ukraine, the channel stopped broadcasting on YouTube and the official website.

The channel was officially banned from broadcasting on 8 June 2023.

=== Scandals ===
Since then, the TV channel has been plagued by a lot of scandals.

On December 3, 2018, representatives of "UNA-UNSO" blocked the entrance to the channel's office and obstructed journalists. The channel stated that "they blocked the entrance to the channel, express their vision and dictate what exactly should be on the air and which guests to invite. Access of guests and employees has been blocked".

On January 1, 2019, the "Lanet" provider stopped broadcasting the "NASH" TV channel, together with the "NewsOne" channel. The suspension of the broadcast is connected with the expiration of the contracts for the right to rebroadcast, as well as with cases of violations of the law by TV channels. The TV channels said that disconnection from the airwaves is an "attack on freedom of speech."

On October 5, 2019, Dmitry Gordon interviewed ex-prime minister from Viktor Yanukovych's team, fugitive Mykola Azarov, on the air of the channel. In view of this, the TV and Radio Council ordered an inspection of the TV channel due to the incitement of enmity in Azarov's statements, as well as the distribution of biased information by the TV channel.

In December 2019, the TV channel broadcast a press conference of the President of the Russian Federation, Vladimir Putin, because of this, the National Council ordered an inspection of the TV channel.

On August 24, 2020, the TV channel released an anti-Ukrainian video for the Independence Day of Ukraine entitled "Our (in)dependence".

On October 1, 2020, the "NASH" TV channel conducted a live poll on whether Russian President Vladimir Putin should be awarded the Nobel Peace Prize, publishing the result that 76% of the TV channel's viewers believe that it should be.

On December 4, 2020, "NASH" held a telecast with Rodion Miroshnyk, a representative of the LPR terrorist organization. During the bridge, in which people's deputies from the "Servant of the People", "Batkivshchyna" and "OPZZh" parties took part. Miroshnyk stated that "Donbas is not part of Ukraine". On April 28, 2021, the channel received two warnings and two fines of UAH 200,000 for telemistake.

On December 10, the National Council for Television and Radio Broadcasting appointed an unscheduled inspection of the "NASH" TV channel over the air, in which a representative of the "LPR" took part.

On December 25, 2020, economist Yuriy Atamanyuk stated on the air of the TV channel that "the Ukrainian elite, represented by Khrushchev and Brezhnev, colonized Russia and 14 other republics of the USSR and drained them of resources, at the expense of which they created the Ukrainian republic, which was later handed over to the nationalists."

On January 15, 2021, on the air of the TV channel, former People's Deputy from the "Party of Regions" Olena Bondarenko stated that all Ukrainian military personnel, and in particular those fighting in Donbas, are "criminals."

In May 2021, the leader of the Communist Party of Ukraine, Petro Symonenko, said that the established Orthodox Church of Ukraine was splitting the country, calling representatives of the OCU schismatics.

The head of the National Council for Television and Radio Broadcasting Olha Gerasimyuk said that the TV channel received a large number of warnings for its violations of journalistic standards and asked the court to withdraw the license from the TV channel.

On September 1, 2021, according to Detector media, in the special air of the pro-Russian TV channel "Nash", the leader of the "Nashi" party Yevhen Murayev allowed himself to make racist statements about the modern ethnic and religious composition of the population of Paris and Brussels. The TV channel tried to hide the part of the air where these statements were made.

In November 2021, the YouTube channel of the "NASH" TV channel was partially blocked for violating the copyrights of "Ukrkinochronika", "Ukrtelefilm" and Andrii Pryimachenko, where video footage of the disaster at the Chernobyl nuclear power plant was used.

The channel was officially banned from broadcasting on 8 June 2023.

== Ratings ==
In 2021, the share of the TV channel was 0.33% with a rating of 0.04% (data from the Nielsen rating system, audience 18-54 in the city of 50,000+, 24th place among Ukrainian channels).

== Investigation of activities, sanctions ==
In September 2021, the National Council on TV and Radio accused the channel of violating the Law "On Television and Radio Broadcasting", namely the following violations:

- inciting national, racial or religious enmity;
- hate speech that was broadcast on the air;
- failure to eliminate previous violations.

On February 11, 2022, the NSDC approved a decision on sanctions against the "Nash" TV channel for 5 years. Restrictions include blocking of assets, cancellation of licenses, termination of use of electronic communication networks. On the same day, President Volodymyr Zelenskyi put into effect the NSDC's decision on sanctions.

== Owners ==
The TV channel is owned by "Nasha Praga" LLC, which in turn is owned by the offshore Cypriots Elena Papachristodoulou Psintra and Zoya Ioann "Demosena Investments Ltd.". The ultimate beneficiary is Volodymyr Murayev, Yevhen Murayev's father.

Also, these Cypriots own the offshore Bimersano Services Ltd., which is subordinate to 9.96% of the shares of the Russian bank Promsvyazbank, which handles all financial operations of the Ministry of Defense of the Russian Federation.

== Content ==
=== HERE IS OUR LAND ===
At the end of 2021, the NASH TV channel launched a new information show “HERE IS OUR LAND.” In this television show, journalists visited various cities and villages of Ukraine where they learned about the problems of local residents and discussed them with guests in the studio. The TV show was, however, negatively received by the public as an election campaign by the owner of the TV channel, Yevhen Murayev, who was the main speaker of the show.

The television show was broadcast from September to November 2021 and ended with a program manifesto by the owner of the NASH TV channel and leader of the Nashi party, Yevhen Murayev, entitled “Formula of the Country”.

== Presenters ==
- Nazar Diorditsa (Max Nazarov)
- Angelina Pichik
- Anton Dovlatov
- Anastasia Gusareva
- Yaroslava Maslova
- Alexandra Segal
- Ivan Dudchak
- Artem Nikiforov
- Olga Veremiy
- Lana Shevchuk
- Alexander Lirchuk
- Alexander Skazkin
- Oleg Nechay
- Dmitry Spivak

=== Former channel presenters ===
- Taras Chechko
- Rostislav Sukhachev
- Alexander Belov
- Alexander the Rev
- Alexandra Senko
- Anastasia Mitnitskaya
- Tigran Martirosyan
- Oksana Grechko
- Ekaterina Lesik
- Vlad Voloshin
- Alena Chernovol
- Anna Stepanets
- Vladimir Poluev

== Logos ==
The TV channel changed 3 logos.

Used from November 7, 2018 to December 3, 2019

Used from December 4, 2019 to January 16, 2020.

Used from January 17, 2020 to February 24, 2022

== See also ==
- Nashi
- NewsOne
- 112 Ukraine
- ZIK
- First Independent
