= Kazanka Raion =

Former subdivision of Mykolaiv Oblast, Ukraine

Kazanka Raion Казанківський район
- Raion
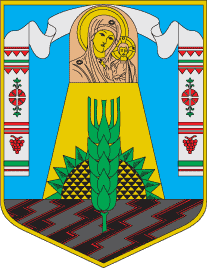
- Flag Coat of arms

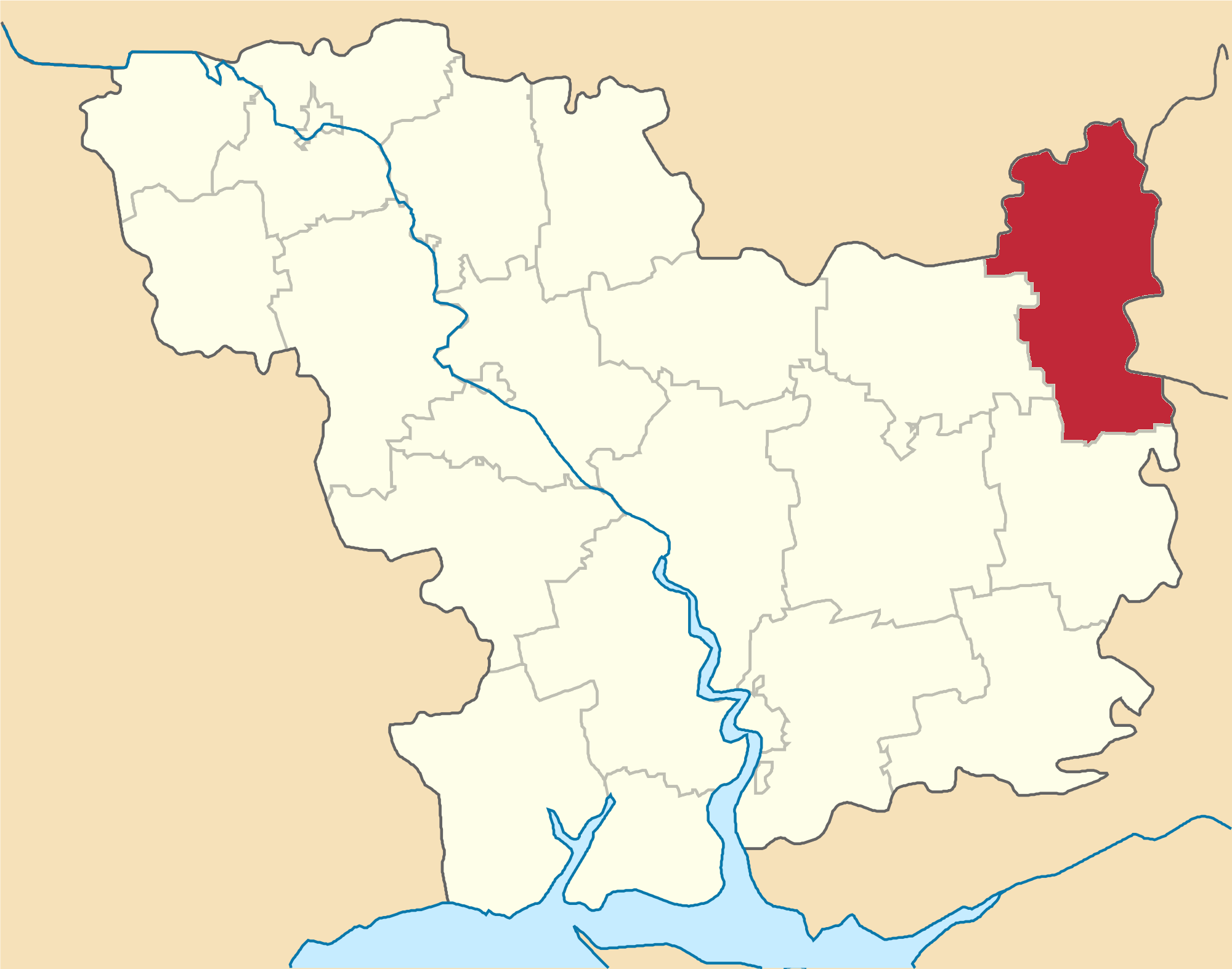
- Coordinates: 47°45′45″N 32°53′10″E
- Country: Ukraine
- Oblast: Mykolaiv Oblast
- Established: 1923
- Disestablished: 18 July 2020
- Admin. center: Kazanka
- Subdivisions: List: 0 — city councils; 1 — settlement councils; 17 — rural councils; Number of localities: 0 — cities; 1 — urban-type settlements; 62 — villages; 8 — rural settlements

Government
  - Governor: Vasyl Skrypnik

Area
  - Total: 1,349 km^{2} (521 sq mi)

Population (2020)
  - Total: 18,540 ▼
  - Density: 13.74/km^{2} (35.60/sq mi)
- Time zone: UTC+02:00 (EET)
  - Summer (DST): UTC+03:00 (EEST)
- Postal index: 56000—56067
- Area code: +380 5164

Kazanka Raion (Ukrainian: Казанківський район) was a subdivision of Mykolaiv Oblast of Ukraine. Its administrative center was the urban-type settlement of Kazanka. The raion was abolished on 18 July 2020 as part of the administrative reform of Ukraine, which reduced the number of raions of Mykolaiv Oblast to four. The area of Kazanka Raion was merged into Bashtanka Raion. The last estimate of the raion population was 18,540 (2020 est.)

== History ==
In 1923, Kazanka Raion of Kryvyi Rih Okruha, with the administrative center in Kazanka, was established as part of Yekaterinoslav Governorate. In 1925, the governorates were abolished, and okruhas were directly subordinated to Ukrainian SSR. In 1930, okruhas were abolished, and on 27 February 1932, Dnipropetrovsk Oblast was established, and Kazanka Raion was included into Dnipropetrovsk Oblast. On 22 September 1937, Mykolaiv Oblast was established on lands which previously belonged to Dnipropetrovsk and Odesa Oblasts, and Kazanka Raion became part of newly created Mykolaiv Oblast. In 1967, Kazanka was granted urban-type settlement status.

== Subdivisions ==
At the time of disestablishment, the raion consisted of two hromadas,

- Kazanka settlement hromada with the administration in Kazanka;
- Volodymyrivka rural hromada with the administration in the selo of Volodymyrivka.
