= Kazanka settlement hromada =

Kazanka settlement hromada Казанківська селищна громада
- Hromada
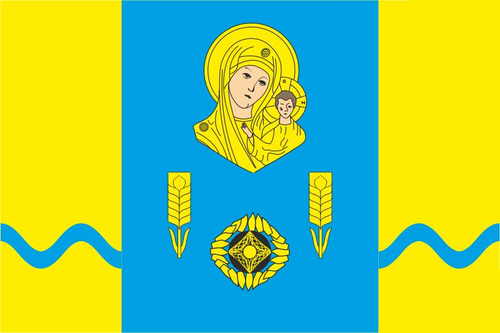
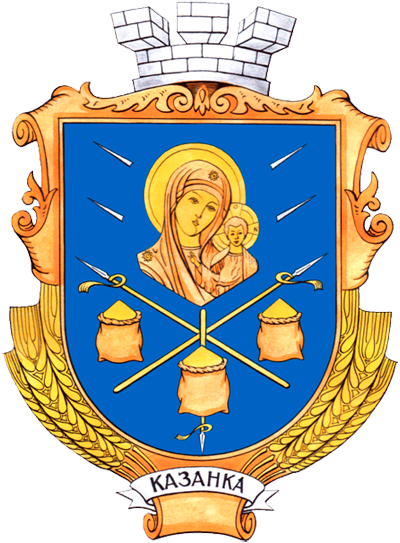
- Flag Seal
- Interactive map of Kazanka settlement hromada
- Country: Ukraine
- Oblast: Mykolaiv Oblast
- Raion: Bashtanka Raion
- Established: 29 September 2017 (amalgamated hromada); 17 July 2020 (hromada)

Area
  - Total: 704.48 km^{2} (272.00 sq mi)

Population (2022)
  - Total: 14,488
  - Density: 20.566/km^{2} (53.264/sq mi)
- Settlements: 54
- Rural settlements: 8
- Villages: 46
- Website: https://kazanka-gromada.gov.ua/

Kazanka settlement hromada (Ukrainian: Казанківська селищна громада) is a hromada (territorial community) in Ukraine, in Bashtanka Raion of Mykolaiv Oblast. The administrative centre is the rural settlement of Kazanka. Population: 14,488 (2022 estimate).

From its inception until 18 July 2020, Kazanka settlement hromada was located in Kazanka Raion. The raion was abolished in July 2020 as part of the administrative reform of Ukraine, which reduced the number of raions of Mykolaiv Oblast to four.

== Composition ==
The hromada encompasses fifty-four settlements: eight rural settlements and forty-six villages. One rural settlement (the administrative centre of Kazanka) and one village (Lazarivka) are directly subordinated to it. The remaining fifty-two settlements are each subordinated to one of ten starostynski okruhy, namely:

- Kashyrivka
- Mykhailivka
- Mykolaivka
- Mykolo-Hulak
- Novodanylivka
- Novofedorivka
- Novolazarivka
- Troitsko-Safonove
- Velykooleksandrivka
- Vesela Balka
