= Pokrovskyi District =

Pokrovskyi District Покровський район
- Urban district
- Coat of arms

- Country: Ukraine
- City: Kryvyi Rih
- Established: 1936

Area
  - Total: 59.5 km^{2} (23.0 sq mi)

Population (2001)
  - Total: 142,955
  - Density: 2,400/km^{2} (6,220/sq mi)
- Time zone: UTC+2 (EET)
  - Summer (DST): UTC+3 (EEST)
- Area code: 50000; 50001; 50004

Pokrovskyi District (Ukrainian: Покровський район), known until 2016 as Zhovtnevyi Raion (Ukrainian: Жовтневий район), is an urban district of northern Kryvyi Rih, south-central Ukraine. It is located along the river Saksahan. Among other districts of the city, it has about 6,000 hectares making it the largest in terms of area, with a population of over 142,955 people (2001). The district has 271 streets with a total length of 527 km, of which 192 are private sector streets.
