= Inhuletskyi District =

Inhuletskyi District Інгулецький район
- Urban district
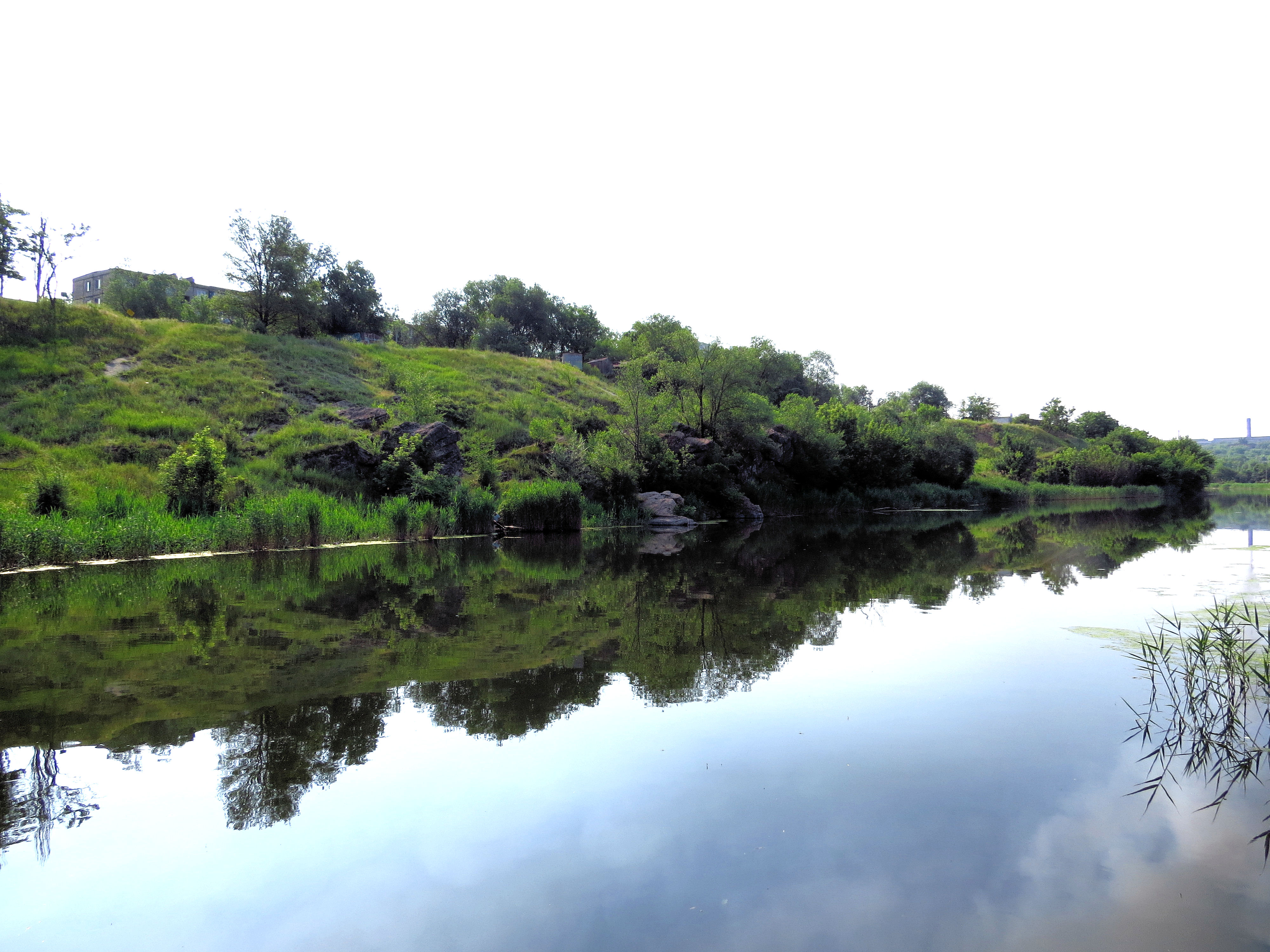
- The Inhulets river flows through the district

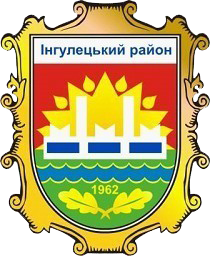
- Coat of arms

- Inhuletsky District goes under number 7
- Coordinates: 47°41′45″N 33°12′00″E
- Country: Ukraine
- Region: Kryvyi Rih Municipality
- Established: 1962 (1922 – former town of Inhulets)

Area
  - Total: 148 km^{2} (57 sq mi)

Population (2013 population estimate)
  - Total: 59,000
  - Density: 400/km^{2} (1,000/sq mi)
- Time zone: UTC+2 (EET)
  - Summer (DST): UTC+3 (EEST)
- Area code: 50026
- Website: www.ing-org.dp.ua

Inhuletskyi District (Ukrainian: Інгулецький район) is the southernmost urban district of Kryvyi Rih city, central-southern Ukraine. Named after the river Inhulets that flows through the area. In the year 2002, Inhuletsky District absorbed a former town of Inhulets, now it is an exclave-neighbourhood of Kryvyi Rih.

== Russia-Ukrainian War ==
On 2 April 2022, Inhuletsky District was fired at from multiple rocket launchers Whirlwind (Smerch) by the invading Russia forces, damaging a gas station, a school and a few private living houses, resulting in no deaths. Later that year, several civilians were killed by rocket attack of Russian troops on the center of the neighborhood Inhulets.

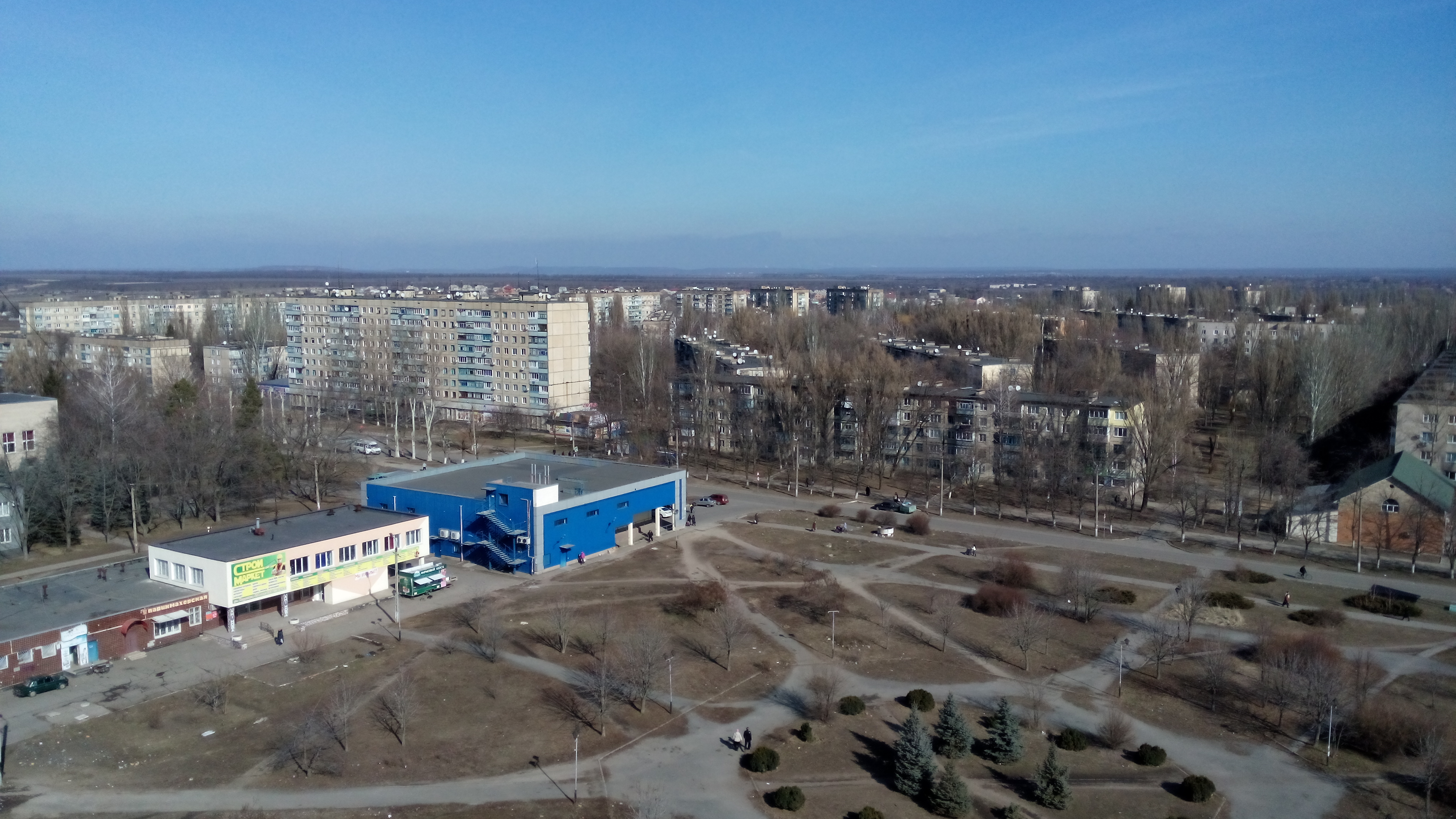
The exclave-neighbourhood Inhulets

== Population ==
Historical population
Year	Pop.	±%
1970	45,247	—
1979	39,053	−13.7%
1989	28,333	−27.4%
2001	23,117	−18.4%
2012	58,000	+150.9%
