= Ternivskyi District =

Ternivskyi District Тернівський район
- Urban district
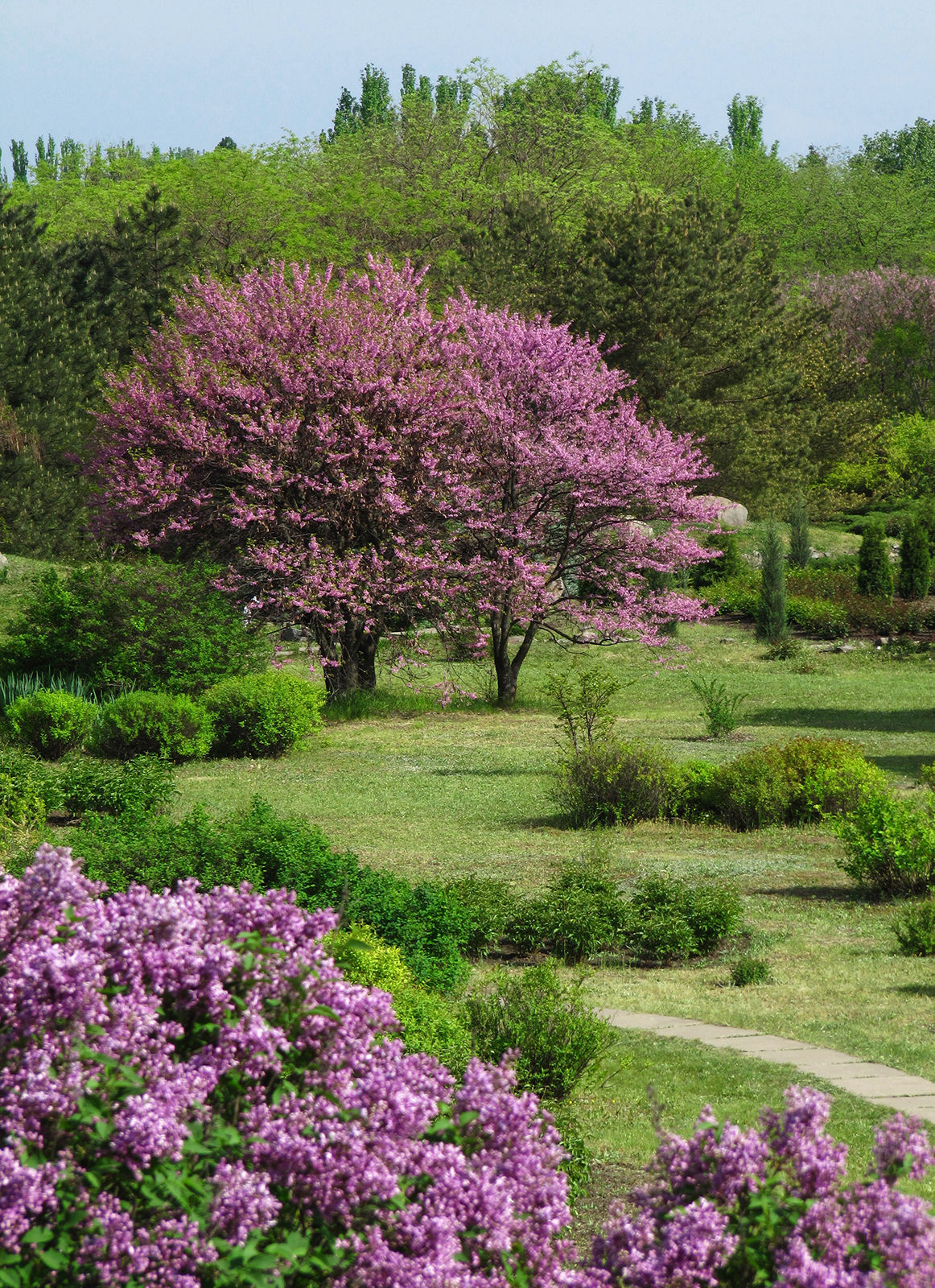

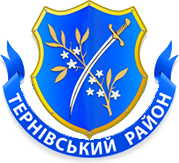
- Coat of arms

- Ternivskyi District marked number "1"
- Country: Ukraine
- Municipality: Kryvyi Rih Municipality

Area
  - Total: 76.2 km^{2} (29.4 sq mi)

Population
  - Total: 82,800
  - Density: 1,090/km^{2} (2,810/sq mi)
- Time zone: UTC+2 (EET)
  - Summer (DST): UTC+3 (EEST)

Ternivskyi District (Ukrainian: Тернівський район) is the northernmost urban district of Kryvyi Rih city, central Ukraine. Population: 83 000 (2013 population estimate).
