= Yuriy Vilkul =

Ukrainian politician

Yurii Vilkul
- Юрій Вілкул
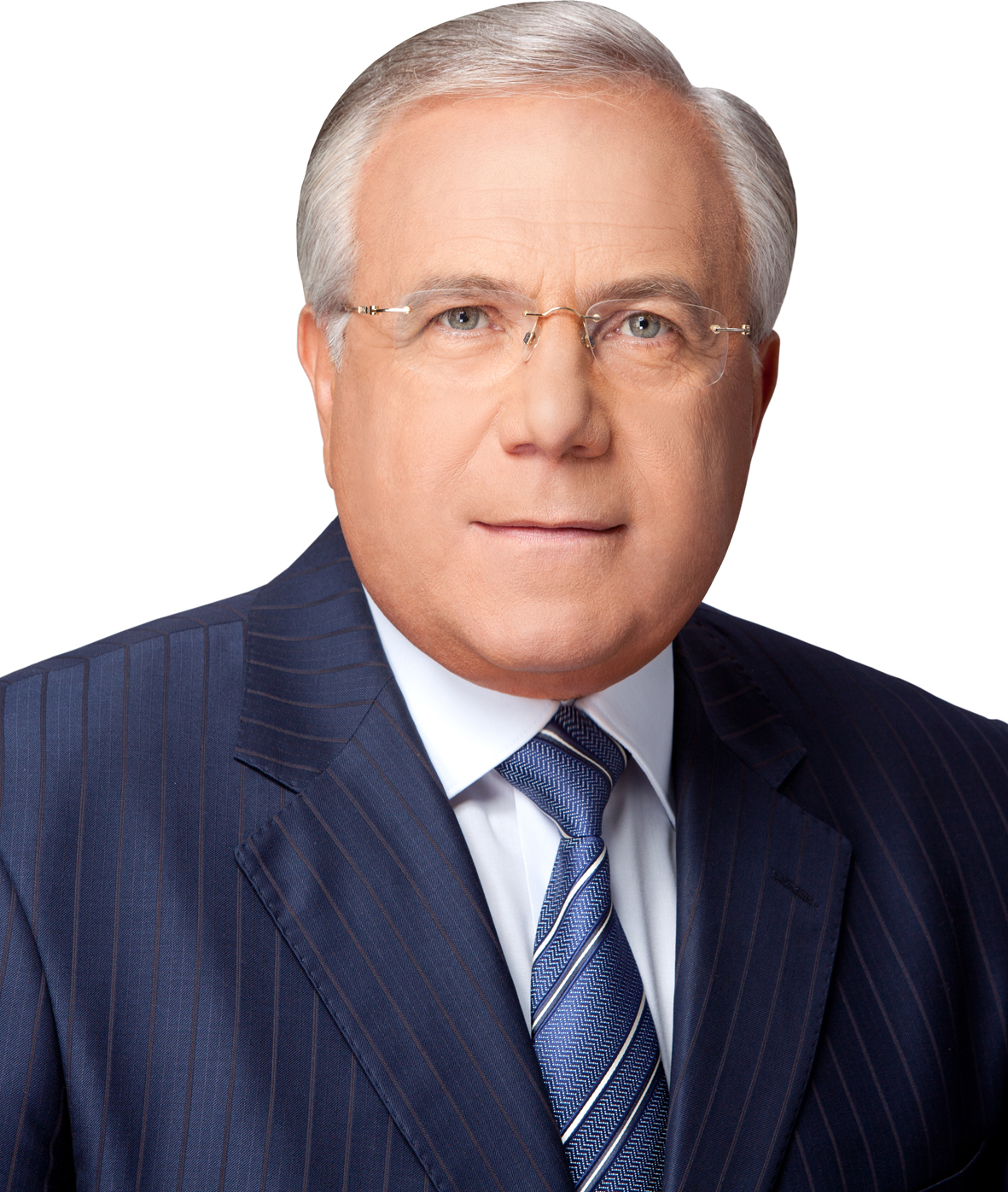
- Official portrait, c. 2010

Acting Mayor of Kryvyi Rih Secretary of the Kryvyi Rih City Council
- Incumbent
- Assumed office 25 August 2021
- Preceded by: Oleksandr Kotlyar

Mayor of Kryvyi Rih
- In office 3 November 2010 – 17 December 2020
- Preceded by: Yuriy Liubonenko
- Succeeded by: Kostiantyn Pavlov

Personal details
- Born: 14 November 1949 (age 76) Kryvyi Rih, Dnipropetrovsk Oblast, Ukrainian SSR, Soviet Union
- Party: Vilkul Bloc – Ukrainian Perspective
- Other political affiliations: CPSU; Party of Regions; Opposition Bloc
- Children: 2, including Oleksandr
- Education: Kryvyi Rih National University

Yurii Hryhorovych Vilkul (Ukrainian: Юрій Григорович Вілкул; born 14 November 1949) is a Ukrainian politician, who served first as elected mayor of Kryvyi Rih from 2010 to 2020, then later again as acting mayor since 2021. He is currently a member of Vilkul Bloc – Ukrainian Perspective, which is led by his son Oleksandr Vilkul.

== Political career ==
=== Mayor of Kryvyi Rih ===
In the 2010 Ukrainian local elections, Vilkul won the Kryvyi Rih mayoral election, securing his first term in office.

On 25 October 2015, during the 2015 Ukrainian local elections, Vilkul defeated his opponent Yurii Myloboh by 752 votes (0.5% margin) in the second round, out of a total 108,000 voters. In the election, Myloboh won five out of the city's seven districts. But in the city's smallest district, Inhuletskyi District, Vilkul won a disproportionately large number of votes. Several opposition parties filed an appeal due to potential election fraud, but was rejected by the courts. This led to several protests in November and December.

On 23 December 2015, the Verkhovna Rada decided to re-schedule the mayoral election to address the fraud allegations. This election was held on 27 March 2016, where Vilkul won 70% of the vote. However, all the ballots from the election were stolen from the city archive. Vilkul was elected mayor of Kryvyi Rih for the second time.

During the 2020 Ukrainian local elections, Vilkul won 44.96% of the vote in the first round, advancing to the second round along with Dmytro Shevchyk from the Servant of the People party, who won 25.94%. However, Vilkul then withdrew his candidacy citing health concerns, and endorsed Kostiantyn Pavlov from the pro-Russian Opposition Platform — For Life party. Pavlov, who only won 9.15% of the vote in the first round, then replaced Vilkul in the second round and was elected mayor of Kryvyi Rih.

Since 25 August 2021, following Pavlov's death, Vilkul has been elected as Secretary of the Kryvyi Rih City Council, while also serving as acting mayor of Kryvyi Rih.

== Scandals ==
During the 2015 Kryvyi Rih mayoral election, there was a scandal alleging Vilkul of voter bribery. As a result, protests erupted against recognizing Vilkul as the legitimate winner. In this election, Vilkul only won two municipal districts while his opponent won five.

Due to widespread protests, the announcement of the election results was postponed. Protests continued with more than three thousand people, as security forces tried to disperse the crowd.

On 27 March 2016, in response to fraud allegations, the city reconducted the mayoral election. In early 2016, there were reports that Yurii Vilkul began distributing "aid" of 500 hryvnias to some citizens, including those who worked at municipal enterprises, large families, and pensioners.

== Personal life ==
Vilkul is married and has two children, a son, Oleksandr Vilkul, and a daughter. Vilkul has deposits in his bank account totaling 3.544 million hryvnias.

== Awards and honors ==
Vilkul's awards and honors include the Order of Merit (Ukraine), the Order of Danylo Halytsky, the Medal for Assistance to the Armed Forces of Ukraine, the Badge "For the Merit to the City", State Prize of Ukraine in Science and Technology, and an Honorary Diploma of the Cabinet of Ministers of Ukraine. He also hold the title of Honored Science and Technology Figure of Ukraine.
