= Saksahanskyi District =

Saksahansky District Саксаганський район
- Urban district
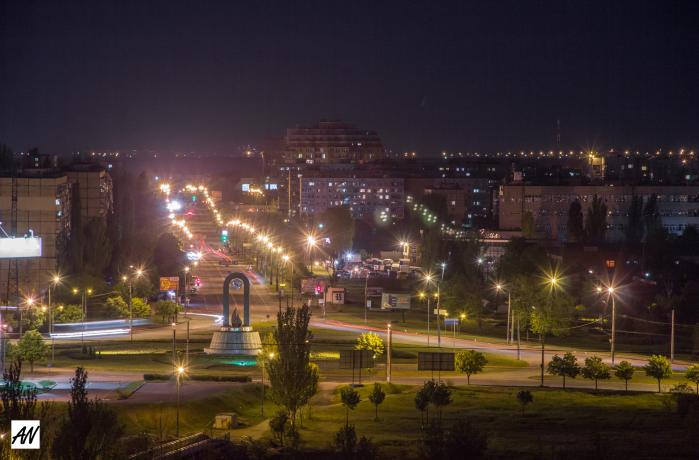
- Volodymyra Velykoho Str. and Olexandra Khymychenka Square

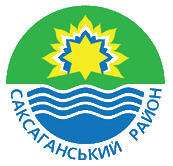
- Coat of arms

- Saksahansky District is number 3
- Country: Ukraine
- City: Kryvyi Rih
- Established: 1975

Area
  - Total: 39.2 km^{2} (15.1 sq mi)
  - Rank: 7th

Population (2021)
  - Total: 118,135
  - Rank: 2nd
  - Density: 3,010/km^{2} (7,810/sq mi)
- Time zone: UTC+2 (EET)
  - Summer (DST): UTC+3 (EEST)
- Website: srvk.gov.ua

Saksahansky District (Ukrainian: Саксаганський район) is an urban district of Kryvyi Rih, Ukraine. Named after the Saksahan River that flows through the entire district. Population: 118,135 (2nd). Area: 39.2 sq km (7th).
