= Dovhyntsivskyi District =

City district of Kryvyi Rih, Ukraine

Dovhyntsivskyi District Довгинцівський район
- Urban district
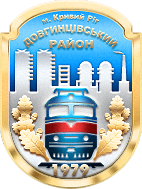
- Coat of arms

- Coordinates: 47°54′06″N 33°29′16″E
- Country: Ukraine
- City: Kryvyi Rih
- Established: 1979

Area
  - Total: 53.05 km^{2} (20.48 sq mi)

Population
  - Total: 102,306
  - Density: 1,928/km^{2} (4,995/sq mi)
- Time zone: UTC+2 (EET)
  - Summer (DST): UTC+3 (EEST)

The Dovhyntsivskyi District (Ukrainian: Довгинцівський район, Dovhyntsivskyi raion) is one of seven administrative urban districts (raions) of the city of Kryvyi Rih, located in southern Ukraine.
