= Tsentralno-Miskyi District, Kryvyi Rih =

Tsentralno-Miskyi District Центрально-Міський район
- Urban district
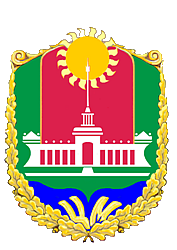
- Coat of arms

- Country: Ukraine
- City: Kryvyi Rih
- Established: 1939

Area
  - Total: 66.42 km^{2} (25.64 sq mi)

Population (Dec 2021)
  - Total: 80,872
  - Density: 1,218/km^{2} (3,154/sq mi)
- Time zone: UTC+2 (EET)
  - Summer (DST): UTC+3 (EEST)

Tsentralno-Miskyi District (Ukrainian: Центрально-Міський район, lit. 'Central City District') is an urban district of western Kryvyi Rih, south-central Ukraine. It is the location of the historical centre of Kryvyi Rih.

== History ==
Being the oldest among all city districts, administratively Tsentralno-Miskyi District was formed in 1939. Kryvyi Rih grew out of a Cossack settlement that was part of the Inhul palanka of Zaporozhian Host. Until 1939, the Tsentralno-Miskyi District was called Yezhovsky.
