= Saksahan =

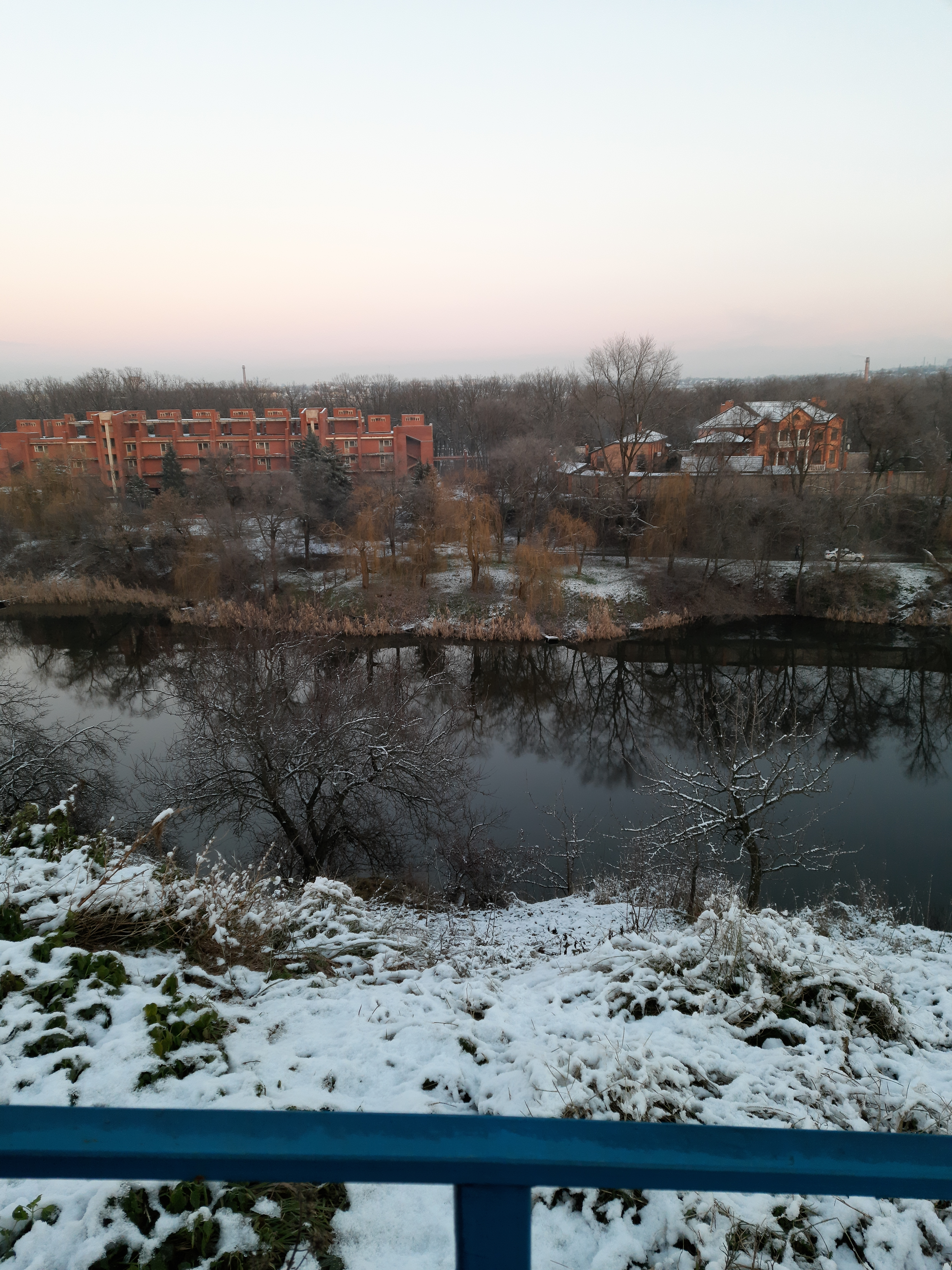
- The Saksahan in Kriviy Rih in winter
- Native name: Саксагань (Ukrainian)

Location
- Country: Ukraine
- Cities: Kryvyi Rih

Physical characteristics
- Source
  - coordinates: 48.2613°N 34.1022°E
- Mouth: Inhulets
  - coordinates: 47.5351°N 33.1959°E
- Length: 144 km (89 mi)
- Basin size: 2,025 km^{2} (782 sq mi)

Basin features
- Progression: Inhulets→ Dnieper→ Dnieper–Bug estuary→ Black Sea

The Saksahan (Ukrainian: Саксагань) is a river in Ukraine, in the southeastern part of the Dnieper Upland. It is a left tributary of the Inhulets (Dnieper basin), joining the Inhulets in the city of Kryvyi Rih.

The name is derived, according to some sources, from the Turkic word Saksağan (magpie).

A village of the same name is found on the left (west) bank of the river.

The river lends its name to Saksahansky urban district of Kryvyi Rih city.

The source of the river, in the modern territorial division, located by the village of Malooleksandrivka, Kamianske Raion, situated at an altitude of 140 meters above sea level. The river is 144 km long (according to some sources, it has a total length of 130 kilometers). The width of the river bed is an average of 5–15 meters, although in places it broadens to 20–40 (29 - 40) meters (watershed line - 250 km).
