= Inhulets =

Inhulets Інгулець
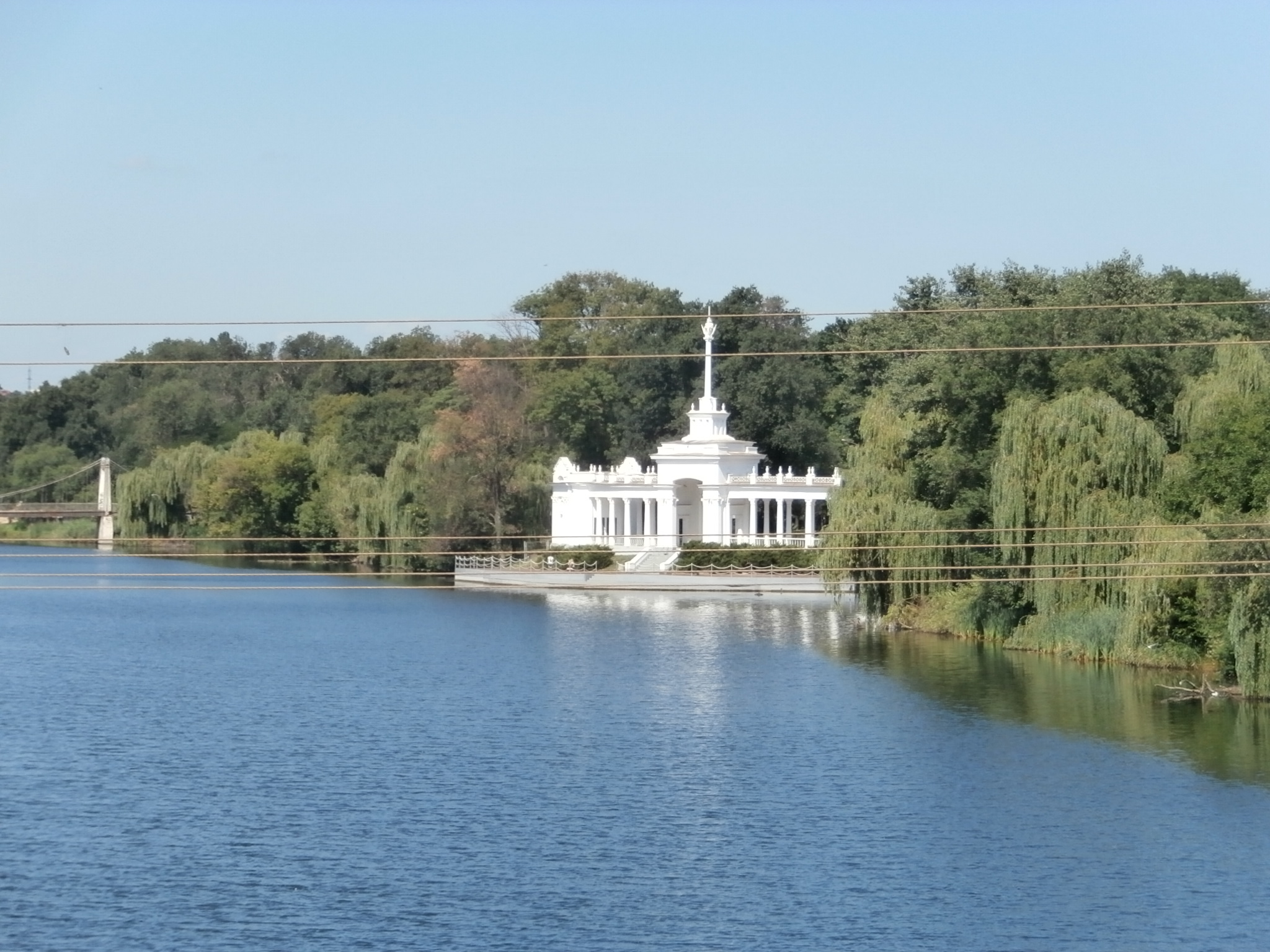
- The boat station (built in 1957) at the historical confluence with the Saksahan river in Kryvyi Rih

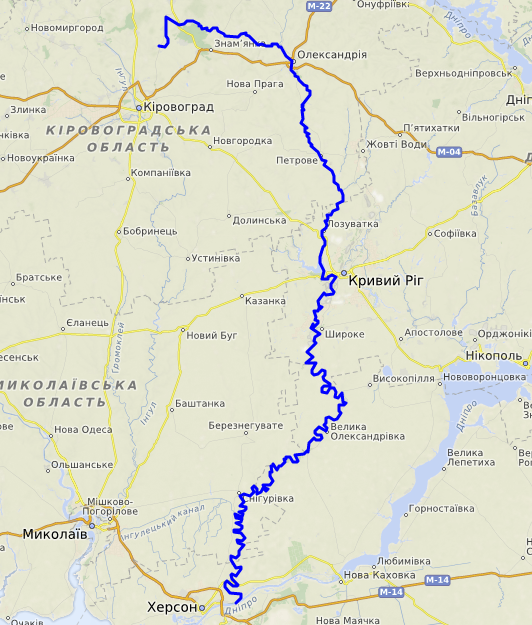
- Etymology: Turkic iyen-kul, "wide lake"

Location
- Country: Ukraine

Physical characteristics
- Source
  - location: Kirovohrad Oblast, Ukraine
- Mouth
  - location: Dnieper
  - coordinates: 46.6842°N 32.8125°E
- Length: 557 km (346 mi)
- Basin size: 14,460 km^{2} (5,580 sq mi)

Basin features
- Progression: Dnieper→ Dnieper–Bug estuary→ Black Sea

The Inhulets (Ukrainian: Інгулець) or Ingulets (Russian: Ингулец) is a river, a right tributary of the Dnieper, that flows through Ukraine. It has a length of 557 kilometres (346 mi) and a drainage basin of 14,460 square kilometres (5,580 sq mi).

The Inhulets has its source in the Dnieper Upland in a ravine (balka) to the west of Topylo village, in the Kropyvnytskyi Raion of Kirovohrad Oblast, about 30 kilometres (19 mi) from the Dnieper river, to which it initially flows parallel. The Inhulets turns south, where it flows through Kryvbas Iron Ore Basin, and the Kherson and Mykolaiv Oblasts, before finally flowing into the Dnieper about 30 kilometres (19 mi) east of the city of Kherson. The river flows through southern spurs of the Dnieper Uplands and then across the Black Sea Lowland. The upper portion of the Inhulets basin is in the forest steppe zone, the lower part within the Pontic steppe.

The river is dammed at the village of Iskrivka in Kirovohrad Oblast and about 30 kilometres (19 mi) further downstream at the city of Kryvyi Rih in Dnipropetrovsk Oblast to form reservoirs. The lower one, the Karachunivske Reservoir, provides the water supply for Kryvyi Rih and for irrigation. On 14 September 2022 the Ukrainian government said a Russian missile attack had broken the dam, causing flooding.

The course of the river near Kryvyi Rih has created many small islands, which have rich vegetation. However, by 2017 the vegetation was impaired by the high level of contamination of the river, due to the nearby iron ore mining industry.

Urban localities located on the river include Oleksandriia, Kryvyi Rih, Shyroke, Inhulets (former city merged with Kryvyi Rih), and Snihurivka.

The M14 highway crosses the river over the Daryivka Bridge, connecting the cities of Kherson and Beryslav.

FC Inhulets Petrove is a professional football team in Ukraine that is named after the river.

During Kherson counteroffensive of the 2022 Russian invasion of Ukraine between 1 September and 11 October, Ukraine regained the northern third of the rectangle between the Inhulets and Dnieper and continued to push slowly south toward Kherson and the dam at Nova Kakhovka.

== Tributaries ==
- Left: Berezivka, Zelena, Zhovta, Saksahan, Kobylna
- Right: Beshka, Bokova, Vysun
