= Oleksandr Vilkul =

Ukrainian businessman and politician

- Олександр Вілкул
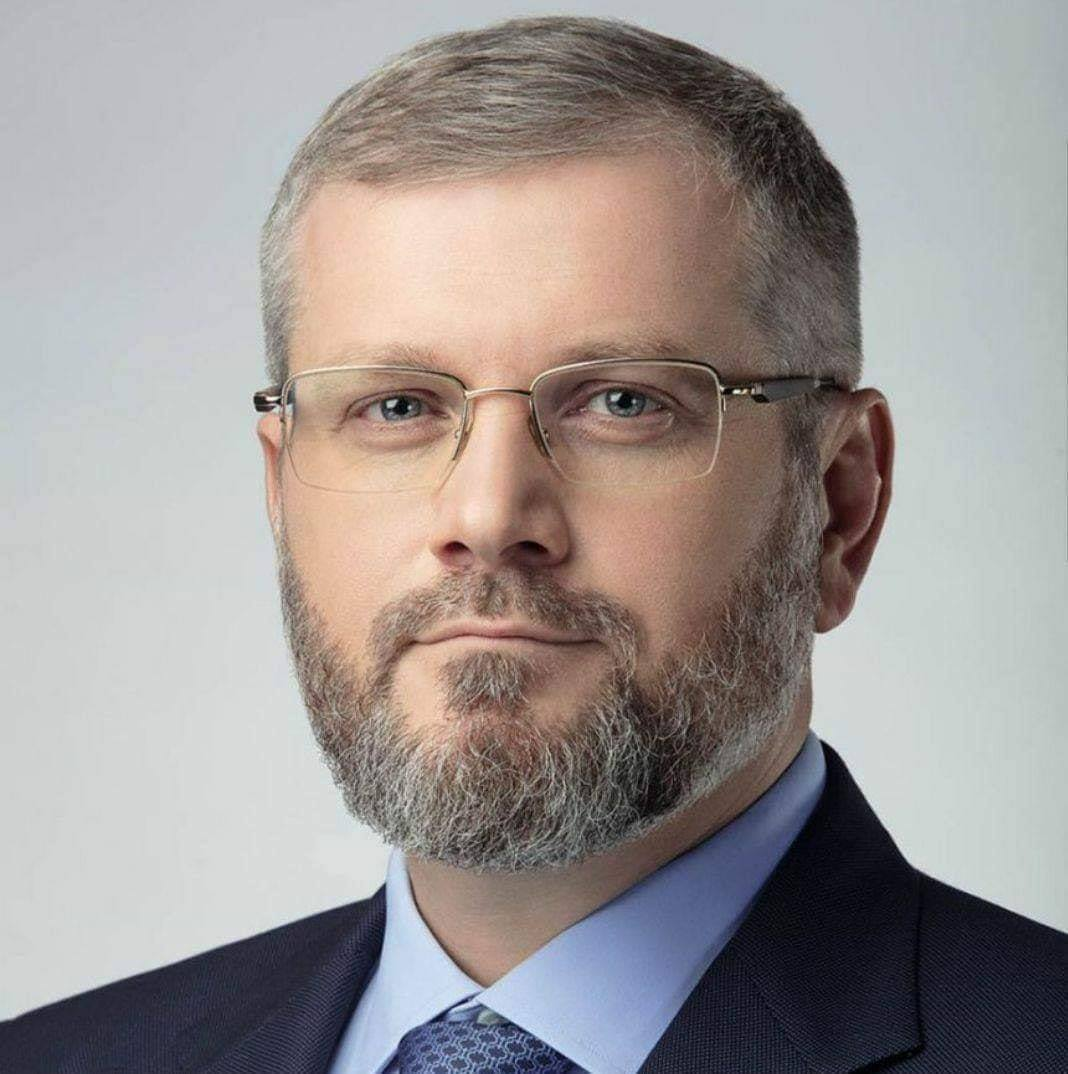
- Vilkul in 2022

Head of the Military Administration of Kryvyi Rih
- Incumbent
- Assumed office 27 February 2022
- Preceded by: Position established

Vice Prime Minister of Ukraine for Infrastructure, Regional Development, Construction, Utilities, and Housing
- In office 24 December 2012 – 27 February 2014
- Prime Minister: Mykola Azarov
- Preceded by: Borys Kolesnikov
- Succeeded by: Volodymyr Groysman (As Vice Prime Minister for Regional Policy)

Governor of Dnipropetrovsk Oblast
- In office 18 March 2010 – 24 December 2012
- Preceded by: Viktor Bondar
- Succeeded by: Dmytro Kolesnikov

People's Deputy of Ukraine
- In office 26 October 2014 – 21 July 2019
- Constituency: Opposition Bloc, No. 2
- In office 26 March 2006 – 18 March 2010
- Constituency: Party of Regions, No. 59

Personal details
- Born: 24 May 1974 (age 52) Kryvyi Rih, Dnepropetrovsk Oblast, Ukrainian SSR, Soviet Union
- Party: Vilkul Bloc – Ukrainian Perspective (since 2020)
- Other political affiliations: Party of Regions (2006–2014); Opposition Bloc (2014–2018); Opposition Bloc (2019) (2019–2020)
- Spouse: Olena Anatoliivna Vilkul
- Children: Mariya Vilkul
- Parent: Yuriy Vilkul (father)
- Education: Technical University of Kryvyi Rih
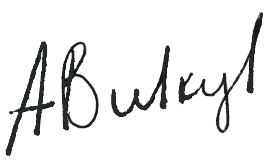
- Signature

Oleksandr Yuriyovych Vilkul (Ukrainian: Олексaндр Юрійович Вiлкул; born 24 May 1974), also known as Aleksandr Yuryevich Vilkul (Russian: Александр Юрьевич Вилкул), is a Ukrainian businessman and politician who is currently serving as Head of the Kryvyi Rih Defense Council since February 2022. He has previously served as Vice Prime Minister of Ukraine from 2012 to 2014 and Governor of Dnipropetrovsk Oblast from 2010 to 2012.

Born in Kryvyi Rih in 1974, Vilkul originally pursued a career in mining, eventually becoming manager. In 2003, he joined the Party of Regions, becoming a People's Deputy of Ukraine in 2006. He served in the role until being appointed as Governor of Dnipropetrovsk Oblast by President Viktor Yanukovych in March 2010. He served in the role for two years before being appointed as Vice Prime Minister of Ukraine for Infrastructure, Regional Development, Construction, Utilities, and Housing Economy, a position he served in until the Revolution of Dignity.

Vilkul continued to be active in politics, serving as co-chair of the Opposition Bloc party until its 2022 ban, as well as leading his own party. In February 2022, he was chosen as Head of the Military Administration of Kryvyi Rih by Ukrainian authorities following the 2022 Russian invasion of Ukraine.

== Early life and career ==
Oleksandr Yuriyovych Vilkul was born on 24 May 1974 in Kryvyi Rih, then part of the Ukrainian Soviet Socialist Republic within the Soviet Union. His family had been miners for four generations. Oleksandr's great-grandfather, Oleksandr Vasyliovych Borovskyi (1896–1972) was a participant in the Russian Civil War, an honorary citizen of Kryvyi Rih, and member of the leadership of the Dzerzhinsky Mining Department. He was awarded the Order of Lenin.

In 1996, Vilkul graduated from Kryvyi Rih Technical University, specialising in open-pit mining. He started his career as an assistant excavator driver at OJSC Southern Iron Ore Enrichment Works (PHZK), eventually becoming the mine master.

From 1997 to 2001, Vilkul was General Deputy Director of PHZK's Commerce and Finance Department. Afterwards, he served as Vice-President of Economics and Foreign Economic Relations of the Academy of Mining Sciences of Ukraine for a year before returning to PHZK, where he served as deputy CEO. The next year, he became the general director of Central Iron Ore Enrichment Works (TsHZK), a position he served in until 2006. From 2006 to 2010, he was honorary president of TsHZK and Northern Iron Ore Enrichment Works, a company he became general director of in 2004.

Over a period of five years, he was among the top ten managers, according to ratings of InvestGazeta's "TOP100: Greatest Managers of Ukraine" and Galitskiye Kontrakty's "Guards of Managers".

== Early political career ==
In 2003, Vilkul became a member of the Russophile Party of Regions. In 2005, he became head of the Kryvorizhska State Organization of the Party of Regions. From 2004 to 2006, he was also a head of the Kryvorizhskyi electoral headquarters of the Party of Regions.

In the 2006 Ukrainian parliamentary election, Vilkul was elected as a People's Deputy of Ukraine, representing the Party of Regions. In July 2006, he was chosen as Vice-Chairman of the Verkhovna Rada Committee on Issues of Industrial and Regulatory Policy and Entrepreneurship.

Vilkul was re-elected in the 2007 Ukrainian parliamentary election. He was chosen as Vice-Chairman of the Verkhovna Rada Committee on Industrial and Regulatory Policy and Entrepreneurship. As a People's Deputy, Vilkul achieved the redistribution of emission taxes in favour of local government budgets. As a result, oblasts got 70% of ecological dues.

In 2007, Vilkul was chosen as head of the Party of Regions' electoral headquarters. Amidst the 2010 Ukrainian presidential election, he served as head of the electoral headquarters of Viktor Yanukovych in Dnipropetrovsk Oblast. Yanukovych would go on to win in Dnipropetrovsk Oblast and the election as a whole, though several irregularities were reported in the oblast's vote counting.

According to The Ukrainian Week, Vilkul is closely linked to Ukrainian oligarch Rinat Akhmetov.

== Governor of Dnipropetrovsk Oblast ==
On 18 March 2010, by decree of President Viktor Yanukovych, Vilkul was appointed as Governor of Dnipropetrovsk Oblast.

From March 2010, Vilkul served as head of the Dnipropetrovsk Oblast organisation of the Party of Regions.

From November 2010 Vilkul is a Deputy of Dnipropetrovsk Oblast Council. He was elected by majority voted system and got 83,17% votes of electors.

According to the Comments weekly newspaper, Vilkul was recognised as the best governor in Ukraine in 2010. In a 2011 poll, Vilkul was chosen as winner of the national "Person of the Year" award, having won the category "Regional Leader."

== Vice Prime Minister of Ukraine and Revolution of Dignity ==
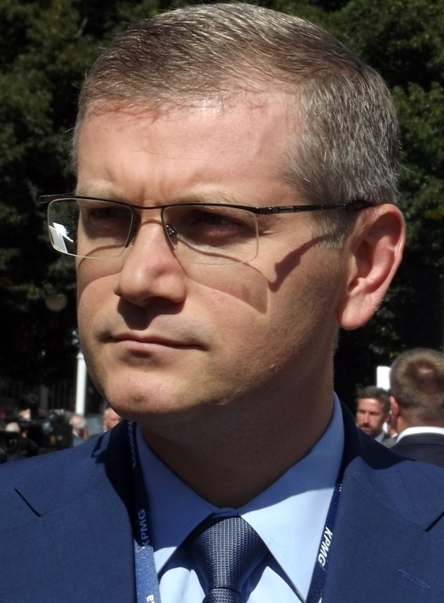
Vilkul in 2013

On 24 December 2012, by decree by President Viktor Yanukovych, Vilkul was appointed Vice Prime Minister of Ukraine.

Vilkul's role as Vice Prime Minister included development of infrastructure, introduction of modern electronics to government offices, affordable housing development, modernisation of housing and communal services, expansion of the tourism industry, and preparation and holding of finals of the European Basketball Championship "EuroBasket 2015".

Following Euromaidan and the Revolution of Dignity, Vilkul was removed from the office, and the First Yatsenyuk government which took office following the Revolution of Dignity did not include Vilkul.

Vilkul was re-elected as a People's Deputy in the 2014 Ukrainian parliamentary election, this time as a member of Opposition Bloc.

== 2019 Ukrainian presidential election and parliamentary election ==
Vilkul was nominated by Opposition Bloc on 17 December 2018 to be their candidate in the 2019 Ukrainian presidential election. However, a Ukrainian court ruled three days before (in response to a lawsuit filed by People's Deputy of Ukraine for Opposition Bloc Serhiy Larin) that Opposition Bloc's congress at which Vilkul was to be nominated could not "reorganize the party by any means". On 18 December 2018 the website of Opposition Bloc stated that therefore all the decisions made at the congress were invalid. On 20 December 2018 the website of Opposition Bloc was down. Vilkul was nominated for the presidency again by Opposition Bloc - Party for Development and Peace (the recently renamed Industrial Party of Ukraine) on 20 January 2019. On 7 March 2019, Yevhen Murayev pulled out of the election in favour of Vilkul. He also claimed that Vilkul's Opposition Bloc and Murayev's Nashi would soon merge.

Logo of Vilkul Bloc – Ukrainian Perspective, a political party created by Vilkul in 2020 mainly to contest the mayoral election in Dnipro

Vilkul lost the election, coming in 8th place out of the 39 candidates in the first round with 784,274 votes, or 4.15% of the vote. The election was eventually won by Vilkul's fellow Kryvyi Rih native Volodymyr Zelenskyy in the second round, defeating incumbent Petro Poroshenko.

In the 2019 Ukrainian parliamentary election, Vilkul was first on the party list of Opposition Bloc. However, the party won only 3.23% of the vote, thus failing to reach the 5% election threshold and causing Vilkul to lose his seat in the Verkhovna Rada.

In the 2020 Dnipro mayoral elections, Vilkul (for the party Vilkul Bloc – Ukrainian perspective) gained 12.95% of the votes, placing in third and thus failing to proceed to the election's second round.

== 2022 Russian invasion of Ukraine ==
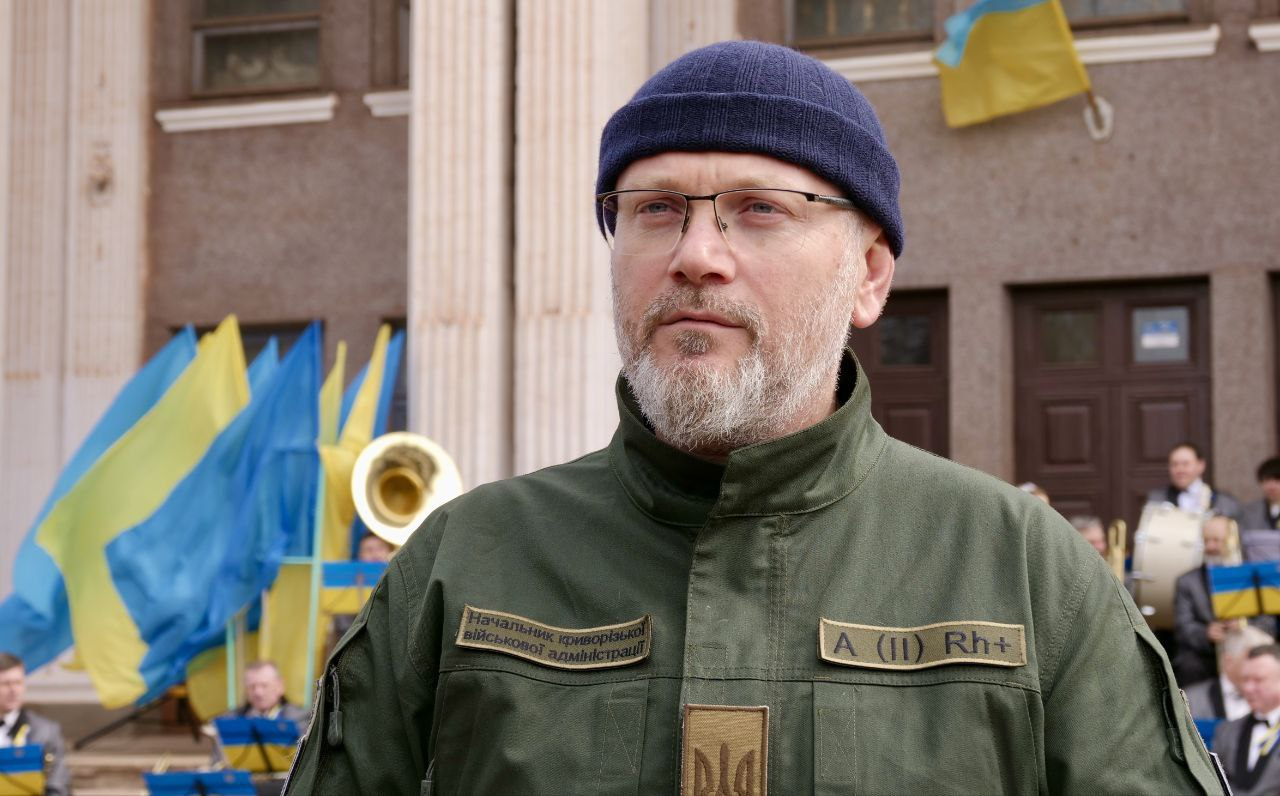
Vilkul in April 2022

On 27 February 2022, three days after the start of the 2022 Russian invasion of Ukraine, Vilkul was appointed as Head of the Military Administration of Kryvyi Rih.

On 20 March 2022, Vilkul rejected the call of Oleg Tsaryov (who claimed that Russian troops were near Kryvyi Rih) to surrender the city to Russian troops. Tsaryov had addressed Vilkul as "my fellow party member" and claimed that Vilkul had "always taken a pro-Russian stance". On Facebook, Vilkul replied negatively to Tsaryov, saying, "Fuck you, traitor, along with your masters!"

== Political views ==
In 2019, Vilkul believed that Ukraine was best served by a military non-aligned stance. Following the full-scale Russian invasion of Ukraine Vilkul changed his view and started to support Ukrainian membership of NATO. Even when he supported a non-aligned stance for Ukraine, Vilkul claimed that he thought that "Russia is a very dangerous neighbour because the essence of Russia is an empire. And an empire always lives through expansion and absorption." In an interview with Ukrainska Pravda on 13 April 2023, Vilkul stated that he believed that the end of the Russo-Ukrainian War "can only be brought closer by the number of coffins that will go from here to Russia."

== Personal life ==
=== Family ===
Vilkul is married to Olena Anatoliivna Vilkul (born 1978). They have one daughter, named Mariya (born 2008).

Vilkul's father, Yuriy Vilkul, was mayor of Kryvyi Rih from 2010 until 2020. In the 2010 mayoral election, Yury ran as a candidate for Mayor from Party of Regions and in the 2015 mayoral election for Opposition Bloc. In the 2020 Ukrainian local elections, Yury was elected a member of the Kryvyi Rih city council for Vilkul Bloc – Ukrainian Perspective; he had also gained most votes in the city election for Mayor but withdrew from the second round of the mayoral election due to health reasons. After the death of his successor as mayor Konstyantyn Pavlov on 15 August 2021, Yury was elected as city council secretary and thus acting mayor, as mayoral powers are temporarily exercised by the city council secretary.

=== Hobbies ===
- Candidate Master (Chess). Candidate Master of Sports in Sambo.
- Oleksandr Vilkul passion is motorbikes.
- Oleksandr Vilkul is fond of Historical Literature.

== Awards ==
- 2003 – the lapel badge of Dnipropetrovsk Oblast Administration "For Region Development"
- 2004 – Diploma of the Cabinet of Ministers of Ukraine with commemorative medal
- 2005 – rank "Honoured Worker of Industry of Ukraine"
- 2008 – "Order of Merit" of 3rd class for substantial contribution to developing of mining and smelting industry
- 2009 – medal "For Substantial Contribution to Development of Dnipropetrovsk Region"
- 23 August 2011 by Decree of the President of Ukraine, for "considerable personal contribution to the independence of Ukraine, statement of sovereignty and international authority, achievements related to national development, social and economic, scientific and technical, cultural and educational activity, faithful and impeccable service to people of Ukraine" honoured with "Order of Merit" 2nd class.
- In 2012, he was honoured with one of the highest awards of Ukrainian Orthodox Church – The Order of St. Andrew the Apostle the First-Called.
- In February 2012, Oleksandr Vilkul received the highest award of Ukrainian Orthodox Church (UOC) – "Mark of Distinction from Celebrant of UOC". Awarded with Order of Ukrainian Orthodox Church of St. Nestor the Chronicler and also with Order of Holy Prince Daniel of Moscow 2nd degree.
- 16 May 2013 by Decree of President of Ukraine No.279/2013 Oleksandr V. was awarded with State Prize of Ukraine in Science and Technology "for development and implementation equipment and technologies of production and application of high-efficiency, save explosive emulsion in Ukrainian mining plants".
