= Dnipropetrovsk Oblast =

Oblast (region) of Ukraine

Dnipropetrovsk Oblast Дніпропетровська область
- Oblast
- Dnipropetrovska oblast
- Flag Coat of arms
- Nickname: Prydniprovya ("Land by the Dnieper")
- Interactive map of Dnipropetrovsk Oblast in Ukraine
- Coordinates: 48.39°N 34.71°E
- Country: Ukraine
- Established: 27 February 1932
- Administrative center: Dnipro
- Largest cities: Dnipro, Kryvyi Rih, Kamianske, Nikopol

Government
  - Governor: Oleksandr Hanzha
  - Oblast council: 120 seats
  - Chairperson: Mykola Lukashuk

Area
  - Total: 31,974 km^{2} (12,345 sq mi)
  - Rank: Ranked 2nd

Population (2022)
  - Total: 3,096,485 ▼
  - Density: 96.844/km^{2} (250.82/sq mi)

Demographics
  - Official language(s): Ukrainian

GDP
  - Total: ₴ 582 billion (€15.1 billion)
  - Per capita: ₴ 186,697 (€4,800)
- Time zone: UTC+2 (EET)
  - Summer (DST): UTC+3 (EEST)
- Postal code: 49-53xxx
- Area code: +380-56
- ISO 3166 code: UA-12
- Vehicle registration: AE, КЕ
- Raions: 22
- Cities: 20
- Settlements: 46
- Villages: 1369
- HDI (2022): 0.741 high
- FIPS 10-4: UP04
- NUTS statistical regions of Ukraine: UA31
- Website: www.adm.dp.gov.ua

Dnipropetrovsk Oblast (Ukrainian: Дніпропетровська область, romanized: Dnipropetrovska oblast), also commonly known as Dnipropetrovshchyna (Ukrainian: Дніпропетровщина), is an oblast (province) in southeastern Ukraine, the most important industrial region of the country. It was created on 27 February 1932. Dnipropetrovsk Oblast has a population of about 3,096,485 (2022 estimate), approximately 80% or 4/5th of the population living on administrative centers like Dnipro, Kryvyi Rih, Kamianske, Nikopol and Pavlohrad. The Dnieper River runs through the oblast.

== Geography ==
Most of Dnipropetrovsk Oblast, including Dnipro Raion, is located in eastern Ukraine, though some parts are in central and southern Ukraine, such as Kamianske Raion and Nikopol Raion, respectively. The area of the oblast (31,974 km^{2}) comprises about 5.3% of the total area of the country. Its longitude from north to south is 130 km, from east to west — 300 km. The oblast borders the Poltava and Kharkiv oblasts on the north, the Donetsk Oblast on the east, the Zaporizhzhia and Kherson oblasts on the south, and the Mykolaiv and Kirovohrad oblasts on the west. Historically, it is located in the region of Zaporizhzhia.

The Black Sea Lowland covers about half of the territory of the oblast, where it lies only within the west bank of the Dnieper. In Terny, a Ternivsky meteorite crater is located. It is 11 km (6.8 mi) in diameter and its age is estimated at 280 ± 10 million years (Permian). The crater is not exposed at the surface. The Dnieper Upland contains a number of minerals including iron, manganese, granite, graphite, brown coal, and kaolin. Kryvbas is an important economic region, specializing in iron ore mining and the steel industry. It is arguably the main iron ore region of Eastern Europe. Named after the city of Kryvyi Rih, the mining base of the region occupies the southwestern part of the Dnipropetrovsk Oblast, as well as the small neighboring parts of the Kirovohrad and Kherson Oblasts.

The region possesses major deposits of iron ore and some other metallurgical ores. To exploit them, several large mining companies were founded here in the middle of the 20th century. Most of them are located in Kryvyi Rih itself, which is the longest city in Europe (roughly 67 km (42 mi) in a straight line from one end to another).

=== Geology ===
Much of the Dnipropetrovsk oblast is located within the boundaries of the Ukrainian Shield and only the northern regions and the extreme eastern part of the territory are confined to the south-eastern side of the Dnipro-Donets depression.

In the geological structure of the region, the breeds come from the archaea, the Proterozoic, the Paleozoic, the Mesozoic and the Cenozoic.

== History ==
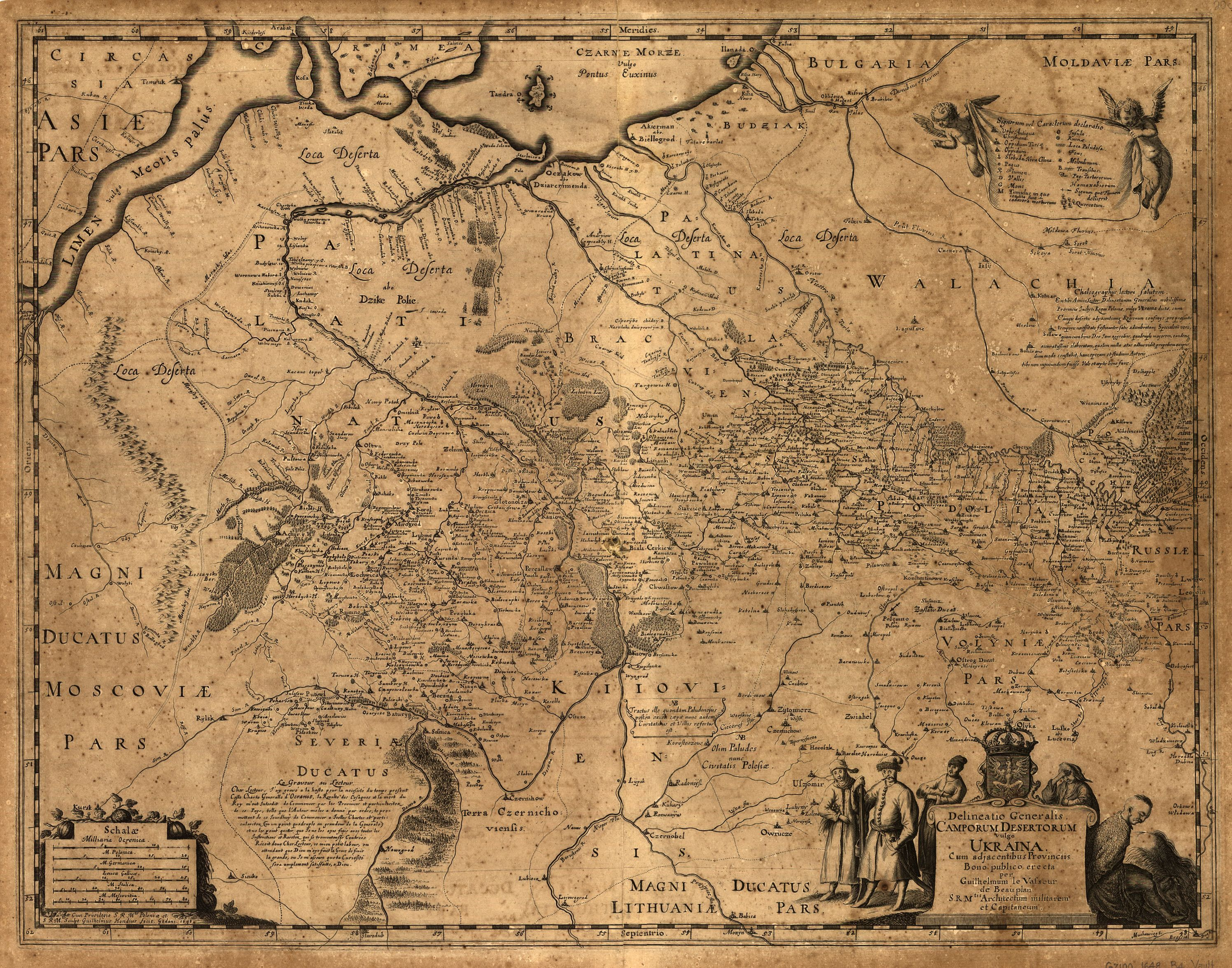
1648 map of Beauplan, with Dzikie Pole (the Wild Fields) identified in upper portion of the map.

In the 6th to 8th centuries AD the first settlements of Slavs appeared on the banks of the Dnieper within the region. During the period of Kievan Rus' (9th to 12th centuries AD) the Dnieper River functioned as one of the main trade corridors of medieval Eastern Europe, part of the route "from the Varangians to the Greeks", which connected the Baltic Sea region with the Crimea and with the capital of Byzantium, Constantinople. The Dnieper also served as a major route for transporting the armies of Kyiv princes on their way to the Byzantine coastal cities in the early 9th and late 9th centuries.

At the beginning of the 15th century, Tatar tribes inhabiting the right bank of the Dnieper were driven away by the Grand Duchy of Lithuania. However, by the mid-15th century, the Nogai (who lived north of the Sea of Azov) and the Crimean Khanate invaded these lands. The Grand Duchy of Lithuania and the Crimean Khanate agreed to a border along the Dnieper, and farther east along the Samara River, i.e. through what is today the city of Dnipro. At this time, there appeared a new force, the Cossacks — armed free men not subject to any feudal lord — who soon came to dominate the region. They later became known as Zaporozhian Cossacks, from Zaporizhzhia, the lands south of Naddniprianshchyna (Zaporizhzhia translates to "the Land Beyond the Rapids"). This period of raids and fighting caused considerable devastation and depopulation in the Pontic steppe; the area became known as the "Wilderness" or the "Wild Fields".

In 1635, the Polish government built the Kodak fortress above the Dnieper Rapids at Kodaky, partly as a result of rivalry in the region between Poland, Turkey and the Crimean Khanate, and partly to maintain control over Cossack activity (i.e. to suppress the Cossack raiders and to prevent peasants moving out of the area). On the night of 3 or 4 August 1635, the Cossacks of Ivan Sulyma captured the fort by surprise, burning it down and butchering the garrison of about 200 West European mercenaries under Jean Marion. The fort, rebuilt by French engineer Guillaume Le Vasseur de Beauplan for the Polish government in 1638, had a mercenary garrison. Kodak was captured by Zaporozhian Cossacks on 1 October 1648, and was garrisoned by the Cossacks until its demolition in accordance with the Treaty of the Pruth in 1711.

Under the Treaty of Pereyaslav of 1654, the territory came within the sphere of influence of the Moscow-based Tsardom of Russia. The parts of the modern oblast encompassed the Kodak and the Perevizka palankas, where, according to the 1756 Zaporozhian Host Register only 20,000 people resided; due to frequent Crimean Tatar raids, they lived predominantly on remote, fortified farmsteads for defensive reasons. In 1774 Prince Grigori Potemkin was appointed governor of Novorossiysk Governorate, and after the destruction of the Zaporozhian Sich in 1775, he started founding cities in the region and encouraging foreign settlers. The city of Yekaterinoslav (present-day Dnipro) was founded in 1776, not in its current location, but at the confluence of the River Samara with the River Kil'chen' at Loshakivka, north of the Dnieper. On 8 May 1775, after the end of the Russian-Turkish War of 1768 to 1774, Russian authorities opened a postal station and track which linked Kremenchuk city, the Kinburn foreland and Ochakiv, all locations of the Imperial Russian Army.

In December 1796, Emperor Paul I re-established the Novorossiysk Governorate, mostly with land from the former Yekaterinoslav Viceroyalty. In 1802, this province was divided into the Nikolayev Governorate (known as the Kherson Governorate from 1803), Yekaterinoslav Governorate, and the Taurida Governorate. The capital of the Yekaterinoslav Governorate was the city of Yekaterinoslav (modern Dnipro). It was located within the former lands of the Zaporizhian Sich. The governorate bordered to the north with the Kharkov Governorate and Poltava Governorate, to the west and southwest with the Kherson Governorate, to the south with the Taurida Governorate and Sea of Azov, and to the east with the Don Host Oblast.

Olexander Paul (1832–1890) discovered iron ore and initiated smelting, and this became the core of a developing a mining district. In 1874 Emperor Alexander II initiated the founding project of a railway, running 505 kilometres (314 mi). This enabled transportation directly to the nearest factories and greatly sped up the development of the region.

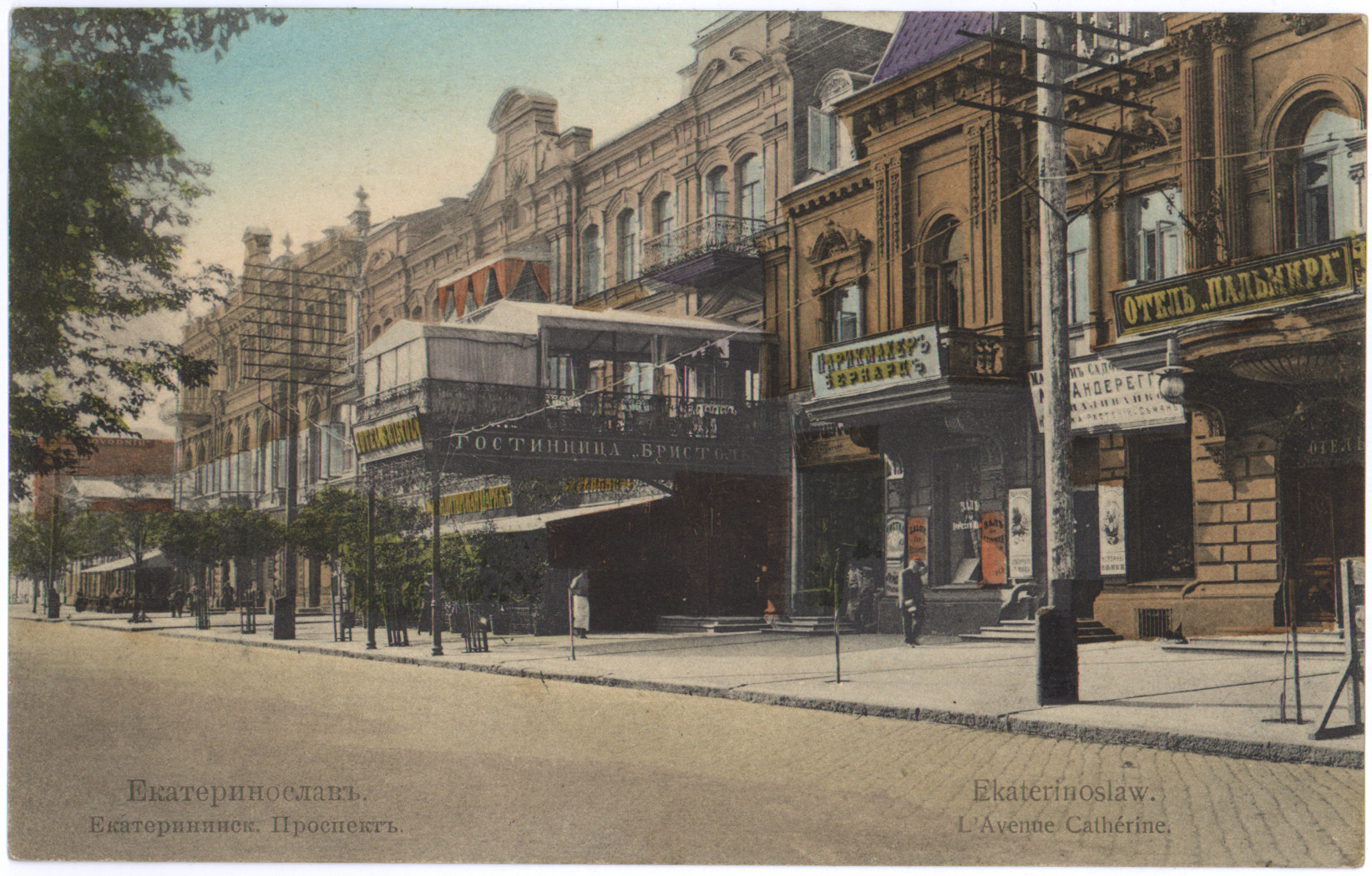
Yekaterinoslav, modern Dnipro, in 1910

On 1 August 1925, the Yekaterinoslav Governorate administration was discontinued, and in 1926 the city of Yekaterinoslav (Katerynoslav) was renamed Dnipropetrovsk after Ukrainian Soviet leader Grigory Petrovsky. Before the introduction of oblasts in 1932, the Ukrainian SSR comprised 40 okrugs, which had replaced the former Russian Imperial guberniya (governorate) subdivisions. In 1932 the territory of the Ukrainian SSR was re-organized into oblasts. The first oblasts were Vinnytsia Oblast, Kyiv Oblast, Odesa Oblast, Kharkiv Oblast, and Dnipropetrovsk Oblast. Soon after that, in the summer of 1932, Donetsk Oblast was formed out of eastern parts of Kharkiv and Dnipropetrovsk oblasts.

During the Holodomor in the 1930s, more than 200 collective farms in Dnipropetrovsk Oblast were put on "Blackboards" which implied a complete blockade of trade and food-aid to villages under-performing in fulfilling grain-procurement quotas; a number representing more than half of all such "Blackboards" throughout all of the Ukrainian SSR.

During the 1991 referendum, 90.36% of votes in Dnipropetrovsk Oblast favored the Declaration of Independence of Ukraine. A survey conducted in December 2014 by the Kyiv International Institute of Sociology found 2.2% of the oblast's population supported their region joining Russia, 89.9% did not support the idea, and the rest were undecided or did not respond.

The city of Dnipropetrovsk was renamed "Dnipro" in May 2016 as part of the decommunization laws enacted a year earlier. Dnipropetrovsk Oblast could not be renamed at the time because it is mentioned by name in the Constitution of Ukraine and accordingly, could only be renamed through a constitutional amendment. In April 2018 a group of over a hundred deputies formally initiated a proposal in the Ukrainian Parliament to change the name to Sicheslav Oblast (Ukrainian: Січеславська область); in February 2019, the Verkhovna Rada voted to officially amend the Constitution, thus granting state sanction to the name change. Later that year the Constitutional Court officially approved the change. The oblast's administrative centre and largest city, Dnipro, had the unofficial name "Sicheslav" (commemorating the Zaporizhian Sich) in 1918–21 during the Ukrainian War of Independence. Since then, the renaming process has stalled (as of December 2025), for reasons such as the 2019 presidential and parliamentary elections, the COVID-19 pandemic and the Russian invasion of Ukraine (2022 onwards) with the supplementing martial law.

During the Russian invasion, the cities of Dnipro, Kryvyi Rih, and Nikopol, among other locations in the region, were bombed by Russia. It was also reported that Russian troops were pushed from areas near Dnipropetrovsk Oblast and Kherson Oblast, near the border. One village bordering Kherson Oblast, Hannivka, may have been occupied and liberated by Ukrainian forces by May 2022. Between 2022 and 2024, there was no further ground fighting and the oblast had remained completely under Ukrainian control. In June 2025, the Institute for the Study of War confirmed that Russian troops entered Dnipropetrovsk Oblast.

== Administrative subdivisions ==
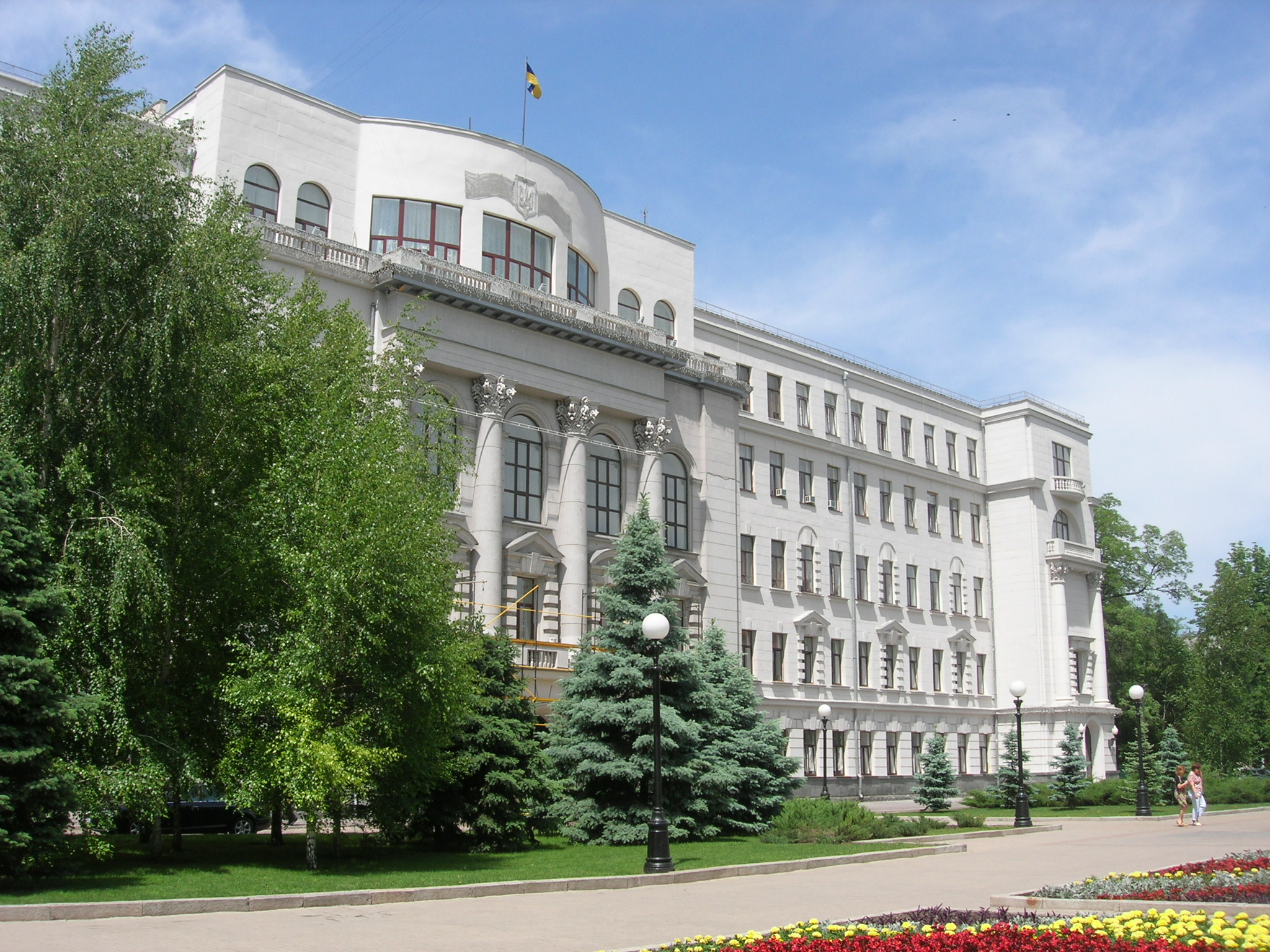
Building of the Dnipropetrovsk Oblast Regional Administration in Dnipro

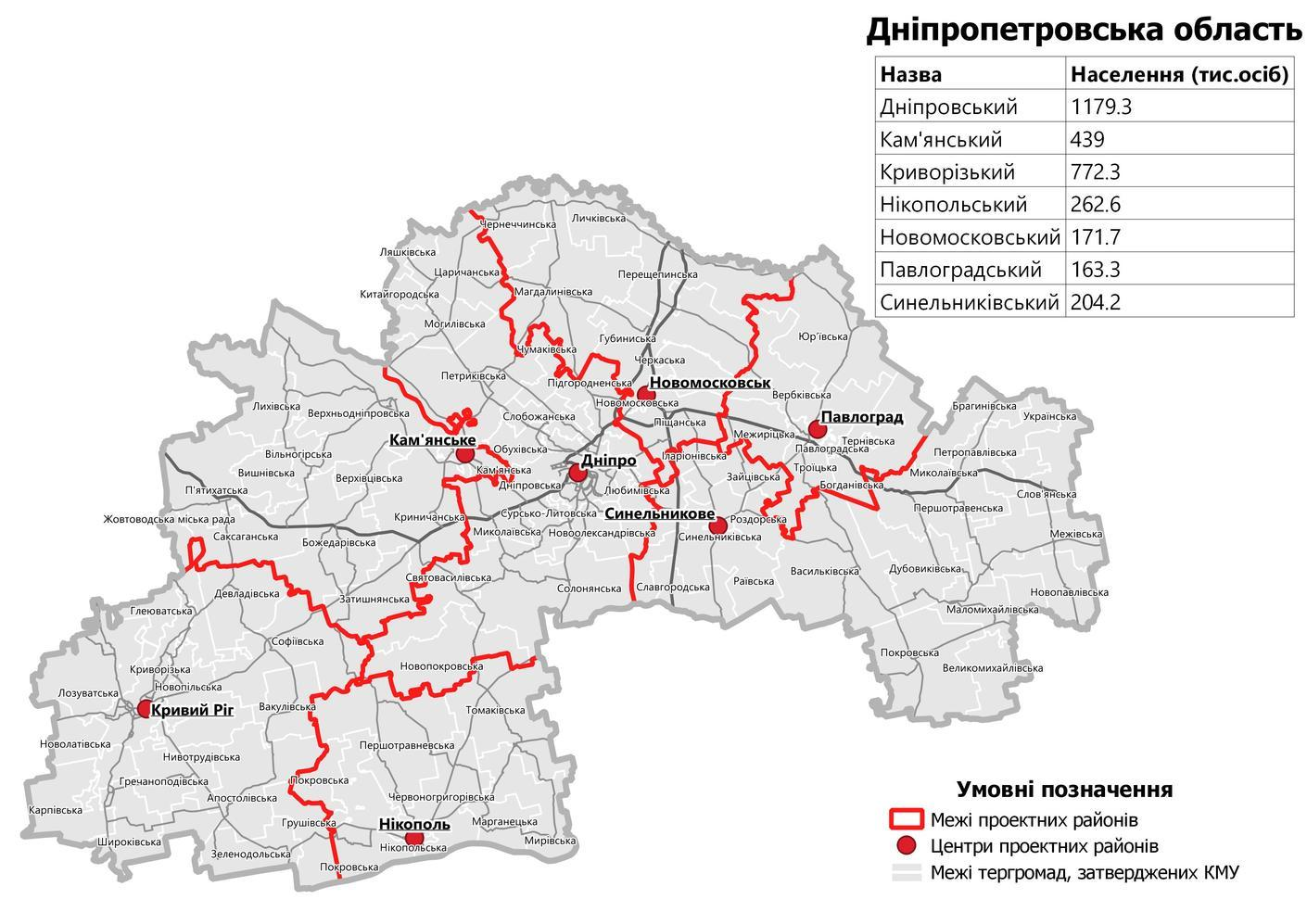
Map of Dnipropetrovsk Oblast.

The following data incorporates the number of each types of administrative divisions of the Dnipropetrovsk Oblast:

- Administrative center — 1 (Dnipro)
- Raions — 7
- City districts — 18 (Dnipro — 8, Kryvyi Rih — 7, Kamianske − 3)
- Settlements — 1504, including:
  - Villages — 1438
  - Cities/Towns — 66, including:
    - Urban-type settlements — 46
    - Cities — 20
- Village communities — 288

The local administration of the oblast is controlled by the Dnipropetrovsk Oblast Rada. The governor of the oblast is the Dnipropetrovsk Oblast Rada speaker, appointed by the President of Ukraine.

Since July 2020, Dnipropetrovsk Oblast consists of the following seven raions:

- Dnipro Raion
- Kamianske Raion
- Kryvyi Rih Raion
- Nikopol Raion
- Pavlohrad Raion
- Samar Raion
- Synelnykove Raion

== Demographics ==
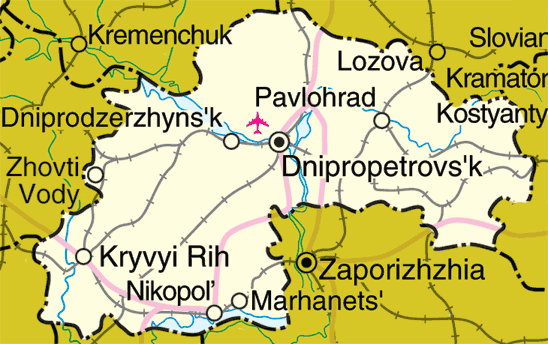
Detailed map of Dnipropetrovsk Oblast.

Historical population
Year	Pop.	±%
1970	3,342,962	—
1979	3,639,423	+8.9%
1989	3,881,224	+6.6%
2001	3,567,567	−8.1%
2011	3,336,504	−6.5%
2022	3,096,485	−7.2%

Its population in 2004 was 3,493,062, which constituted 5.3% of the overall Ukrainian population.

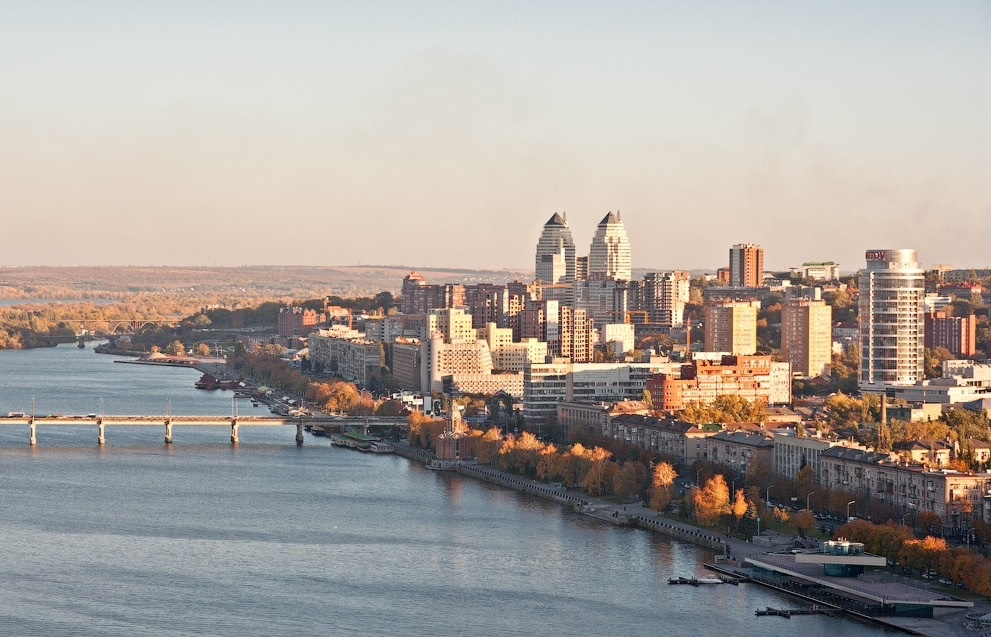
Dnipro, capital and largest city of the province

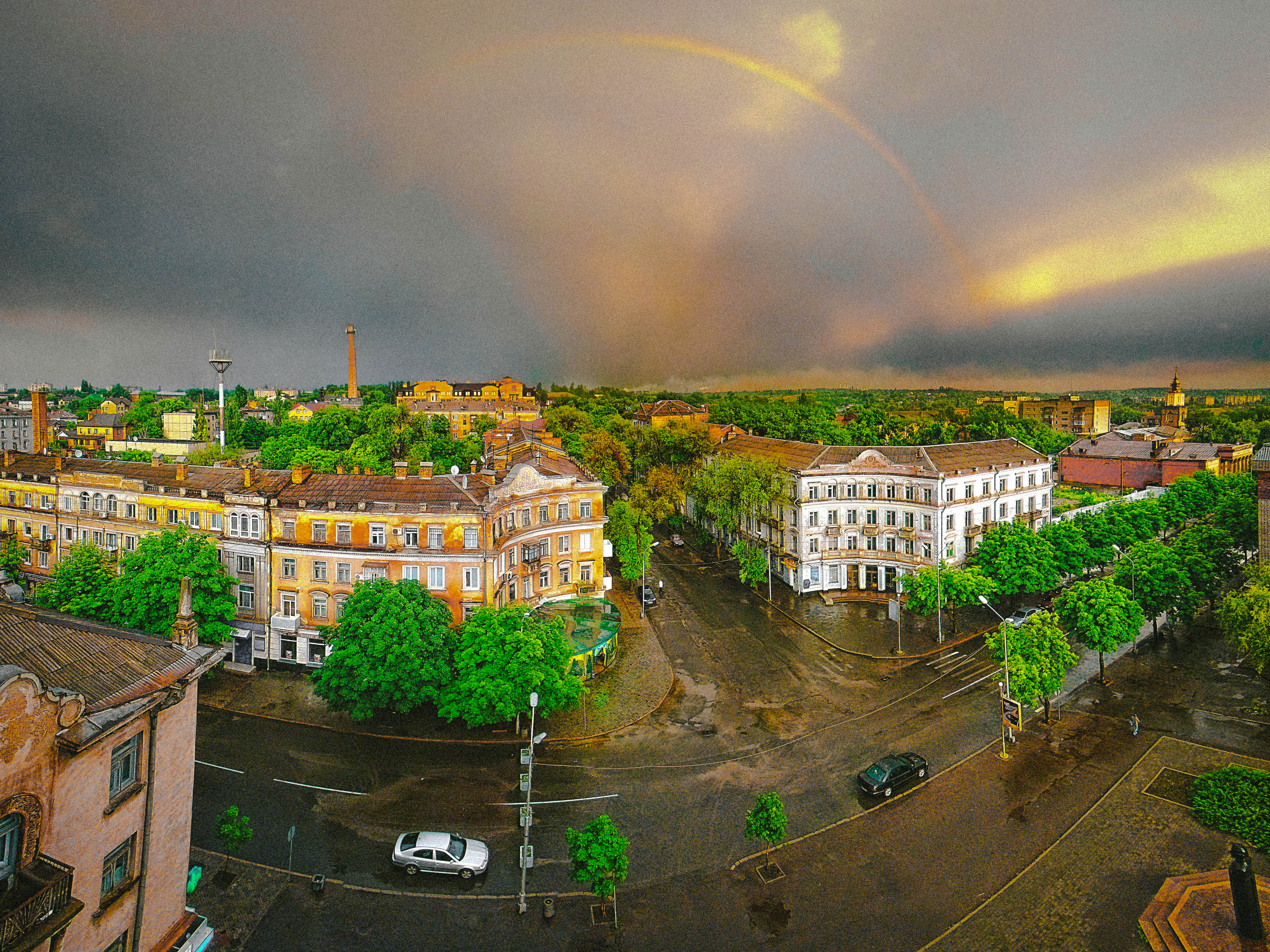
Kryvyi Rih, second largest city

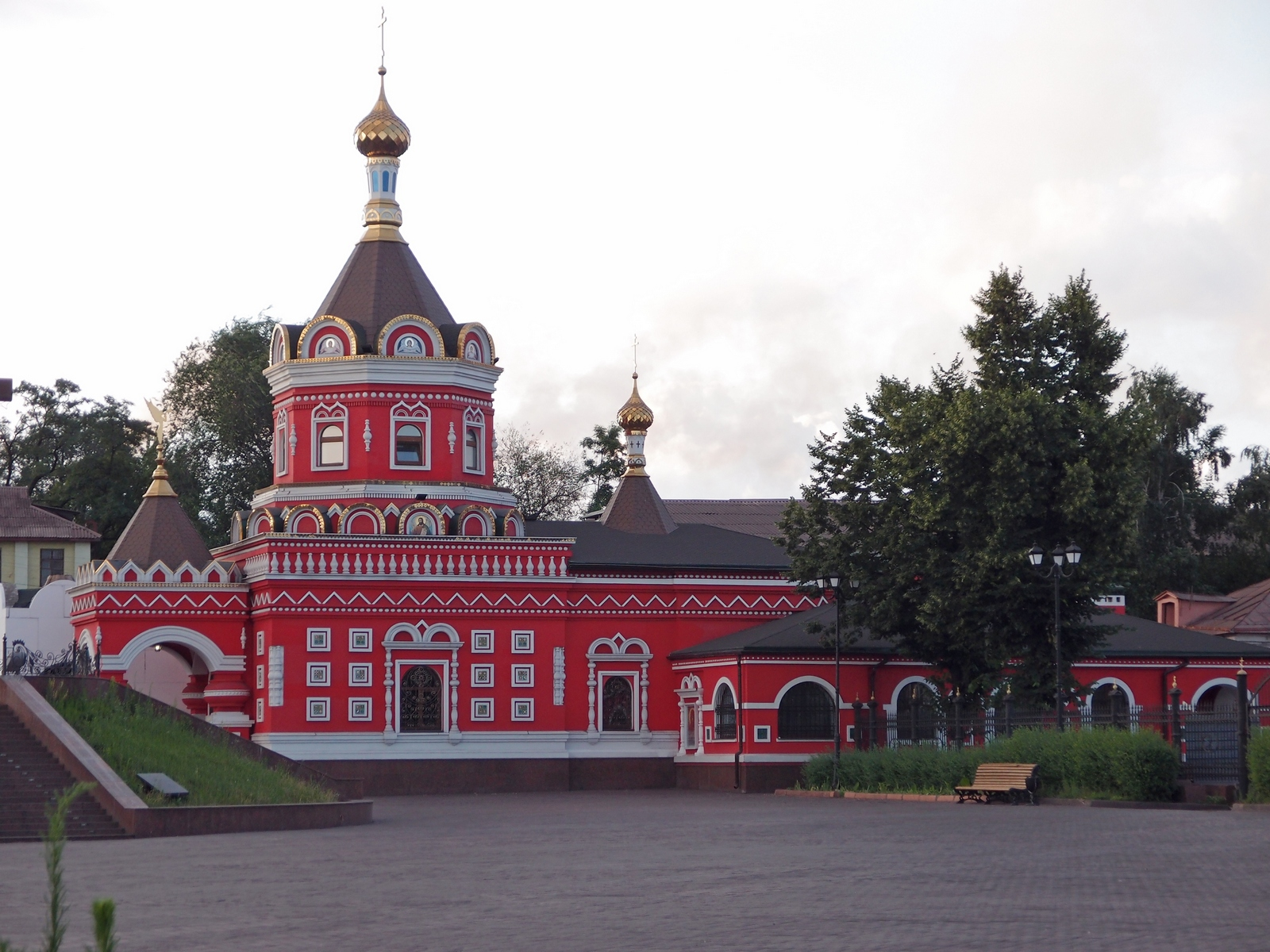
Kamianske, third largest city

At the 2001 census, the ethnic groups within the Dnipropetrovsk Oblast were:

- Ukrainians — 79.3%
- Russians — 17.6%
- Belarusians — 0.8%
- Jews — 0.4%
- Armenians — 0.3%
- Azeris — 0.2%
- Moldovans — 0.12%
- Romanis — 0.11%
- Tatars — 0.11%
- Germans — 0.11%
- Other — 0.95%

the groups by native language:

- Ukrainian 67%
- Russian 32%
- other languages 1%

=== Age structure ===
0–14 years: 14.1% ▲ (male 241,006/female 226,216)
15–64 years: 70.2% ▼ (male 1,100,602/female 1,219,668)
65 years and over: 15.7% (male 168,447/female 348,547) (2013 official)

=== Median age ===
total: 40.3 years ▲
male: 36.6 years ▲
female: 43.9 years ▲ (2013 official)

=== Religion ===
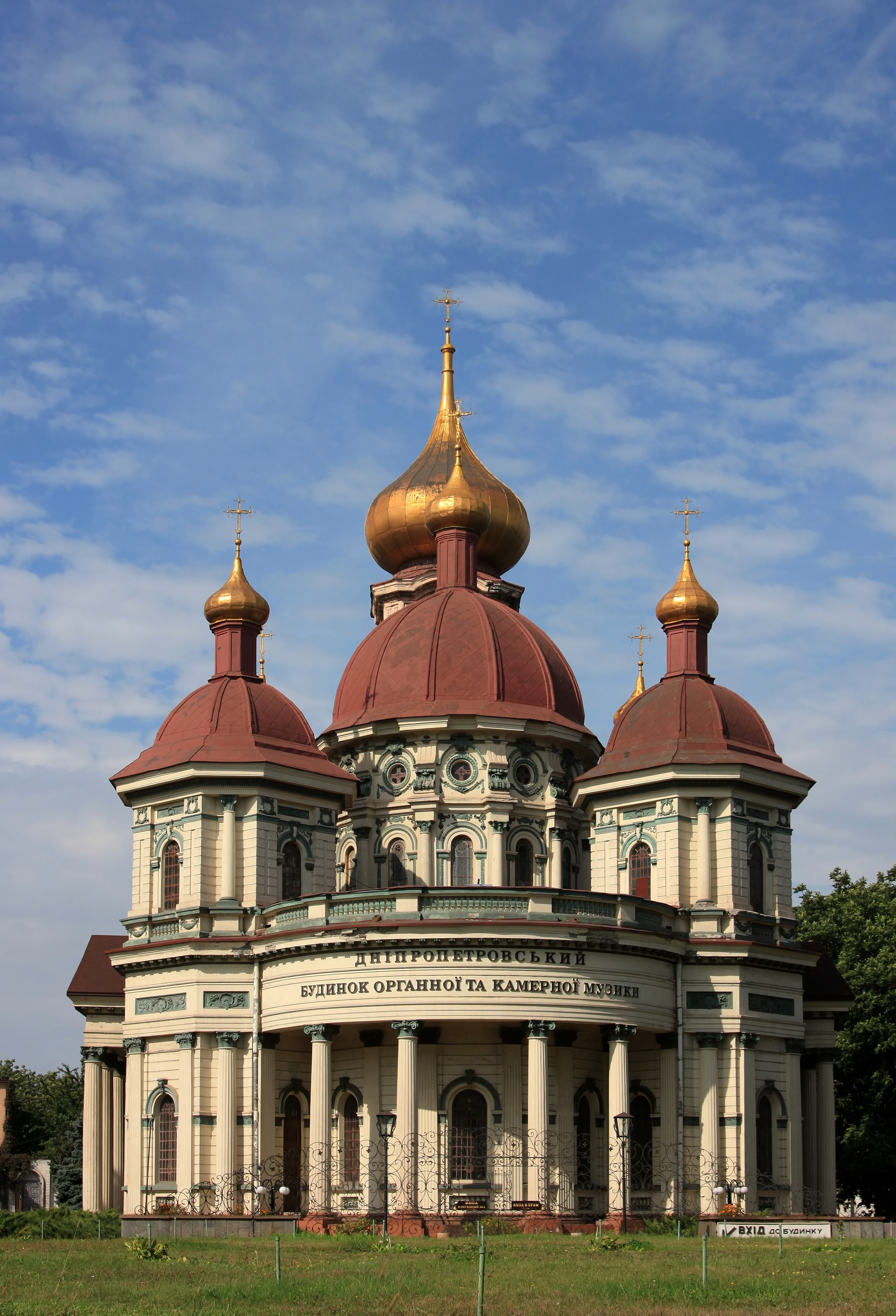
Bryansk Church (Dnipro House of Organ and Chamber Music)

A Pew survey of Dnipropetrovsk residents' religious self-identification showed the following distribution of affiliations: Ukrainian Orthodox Church (Moscow Patriarchate) 47.5%, Ukrainian Orthodox Church of the Kyivan Patriarchate 10.7%, Roman Catholic 1.3%, Ukrainian Autocephalous Orthodox Church 0.8%, Protestantism 32.3%.

The oblast has one of the most balanced percentage of religious people in the nation mainly due to large number of ethnic groups. The Jewish community is centered in the Dnipro (Golden Rose Synagogue) and Kryvyi Rih area, and emerged during a wave of Jewish immigration.

=== Cities and towns ===
There are 20 cities and towns on the Dnieper River. Major population centers today result from historical factors — with the advent of the iron development took place predominantly along the Kryvyi Rih and Dnipro, a city located on the Dnieper. Kryvyi Rih is the center of a large metropolitan area called Kryvyi Rih Metropolitan Region.

Ranked by population, the oblast's 13 largest municipalities are:

1. Dnipro (1,080,846)
2. Kryvyi Rih (662,507)
3. Kamianske (262,704)
4. Nikopol (136,280)
5. Pavlohrad (118,816)
6. Samar (72,439)
7. Zhovti Vody (54,370)
8. Pokrov (46,532)
9. Marhanets (44,980)
10. Synelnykove (32,302)
11. Ternivka (29,253)
12. Shakhtarske (29,140)
13. Vilnohirsk (23,782)

== Transport ==
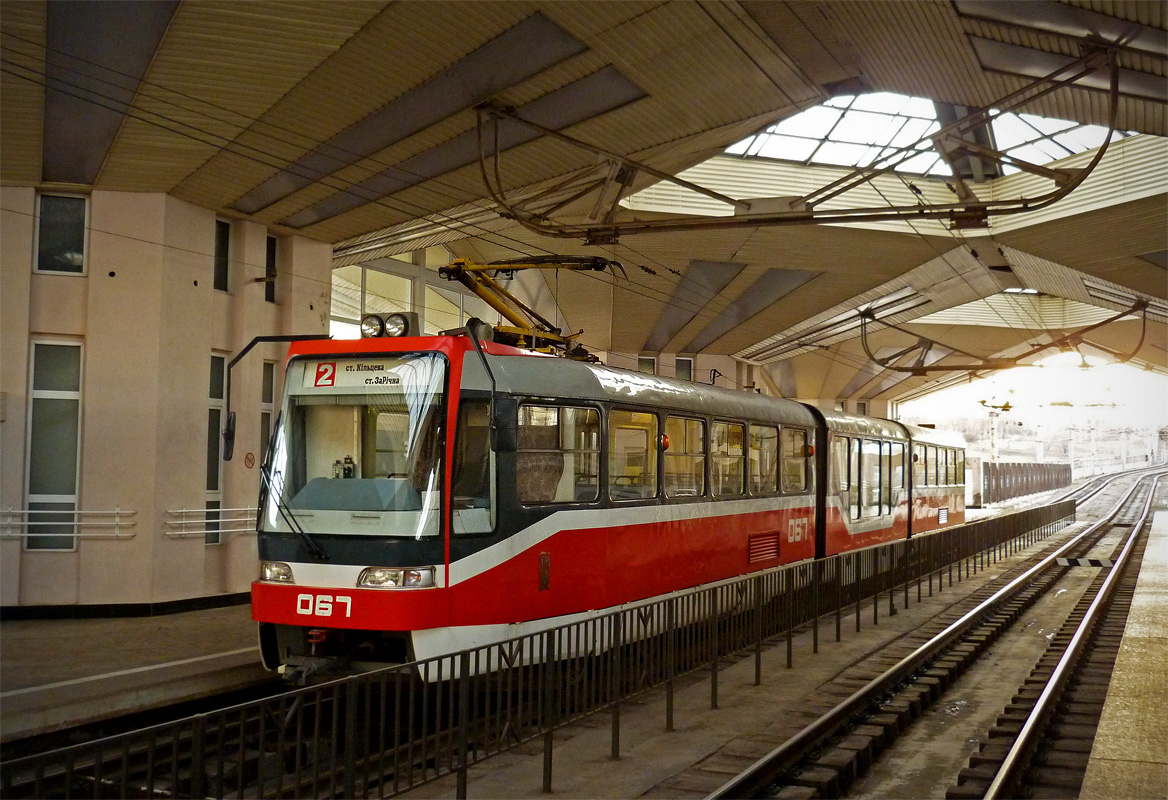
Kryvyi Rih Metro

There are eight over-Dnieper bridges and dozens of grade-separated intersections. Several new intersections are under construction. European route E105 cross Left-bank Dnipro from North to South. Highway M04 (Ukraine) and Highway M18 (Ukraine) cross River Dnieper and Dnipro from West to East, entering Kryvyi Rih. Overall, roads are in poor technical condition and maintained inadequately.

Cisdnieper Railway (NDZ), headquartered in Dnipro, is a component part of the Ukrzaliznytsia (UZ) company. CDR's route map includes all the railroads in the Dnipropetrovsk, Zaporizhzhia, Kharkiv, Kherson oblasts and the Autonomous Republic of Crimea.

As of 2008, Cisdnieper rail system included 3,275 km (2,035 mi) of track, of which 93,3% were electrified. The CDR consists of five sections (directions), the Dnipro, Zaporizhzhia, Kryvyi Rih, and Crimea directions. There are 244 railway stations in the NDR system. More than a dozen elektrichka stops are located within the city allowing residents of different neighborhoods to use the suburban trains.

The cities of Dnipro and Kryvyi Rih are served by a local sales-tax-funded bus, tram, metro and trolleybus systems.

Dnipro International Airport and Kryvyi Rih International Airport are the only international airports. The airport of Dnipro serves as one of the hubs for Dniproavia. The airport has non-stop service to over 20 destinations throughout Ukraine and Turkey, as well as to Vienna and Tel Aviv. Kryvyi Rih International Airport provides limited commercial air service.

== Environment ==
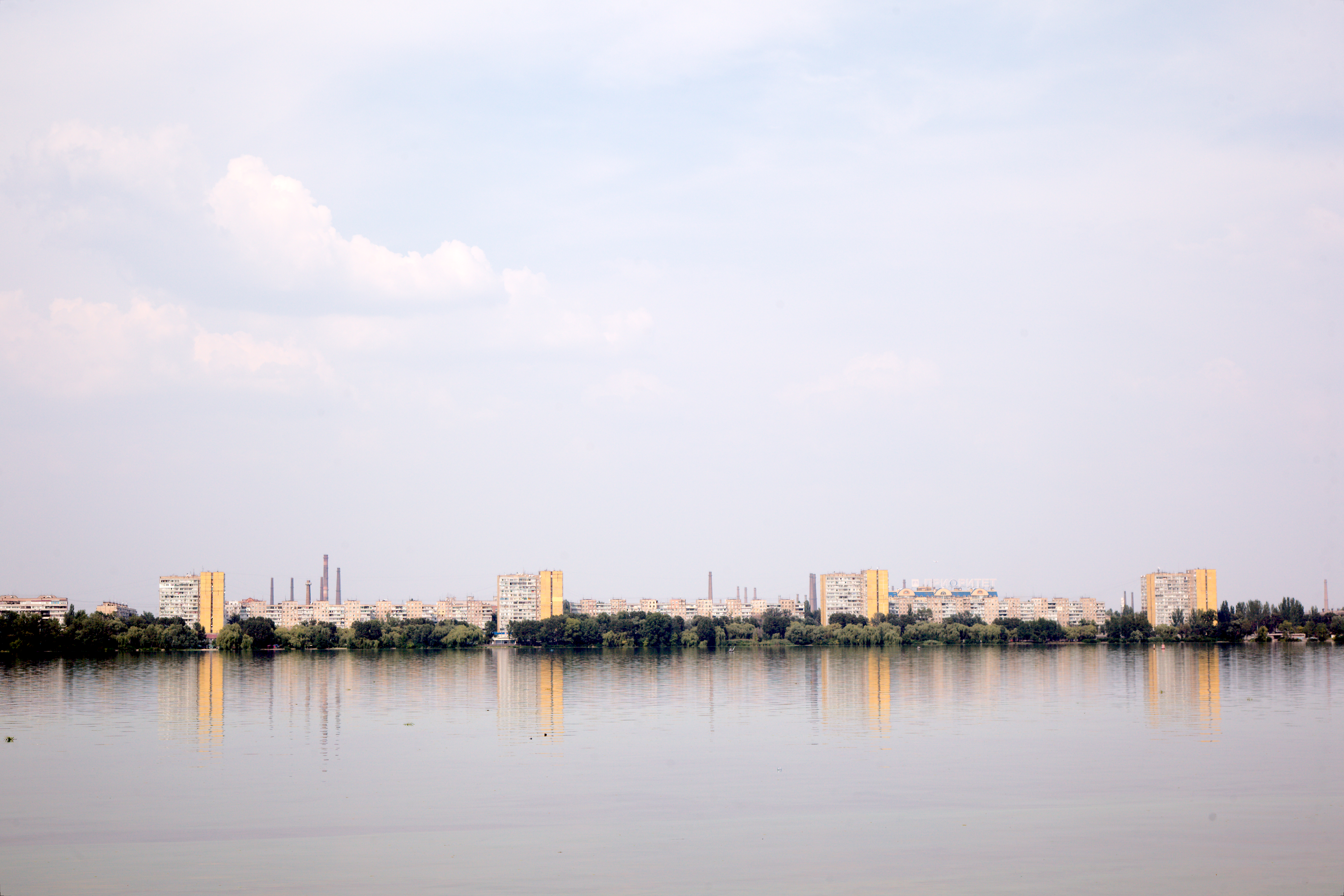
River Dnieper in Dnipro

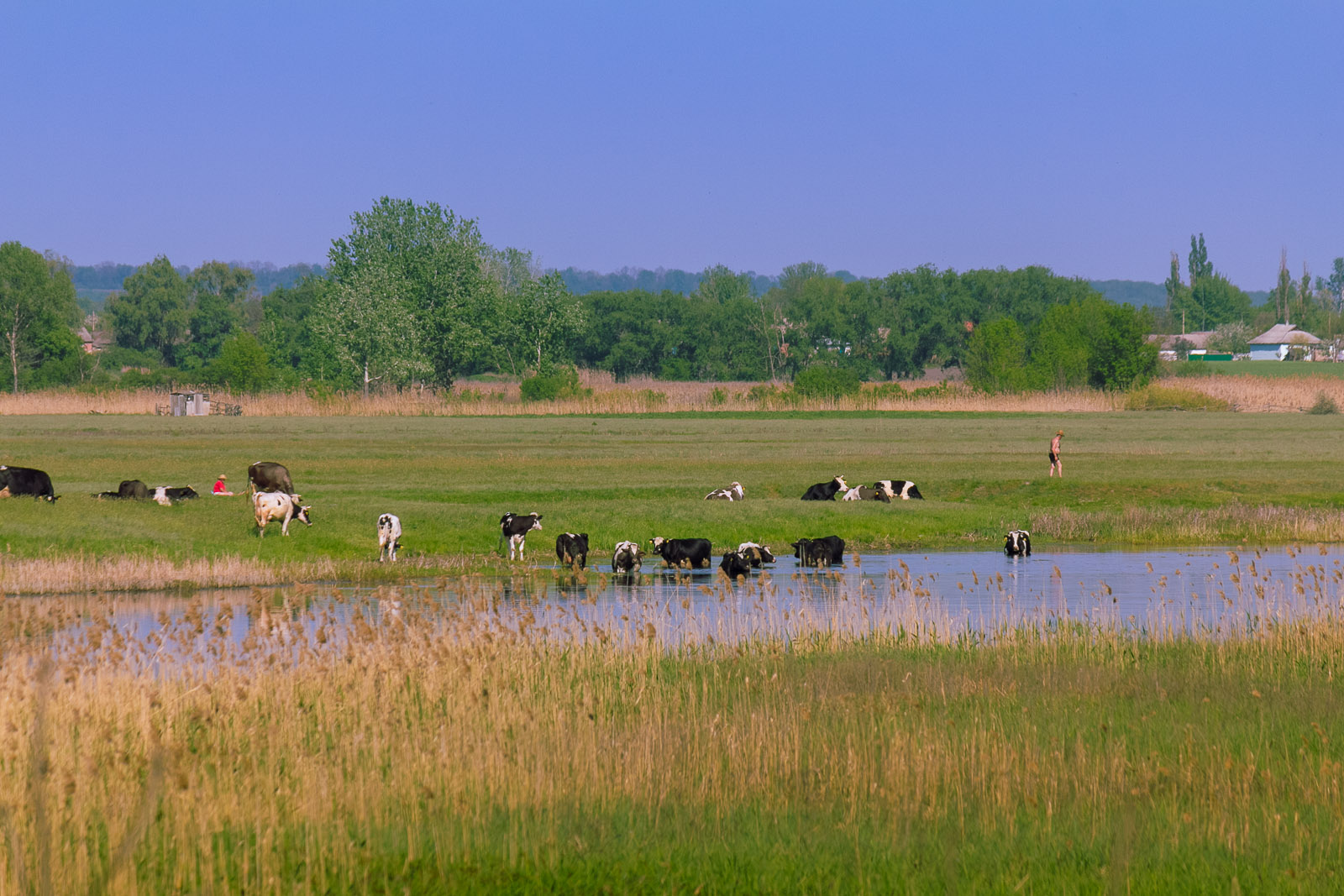
Pryorilskyi Landscape Reserve

The oblast is situated in the steppe region. Forests in the oblast occupy about 3.9% of the oblast's total territory. The average temperature in the winter balances from −3 to −5 °C and in the summer from 22 to 24 °C. The average annual rainfall is 400–490 mm. During the summer, Dnipropetrovsk oblast is very warm (average day temperature in July is 24 to 28 °C (75 to 82 °F), even hot sometimes 34 to 38 °C (93 to 100 °F). Temperatures as high as 36 °C (97 °F) have been recorded in May. Winter is not so cold (average day temperature in January is −3 to 0 °C (27 to 32 °F), but when there is no snow and the wind blows hard, it feels extremely cold. A mix of snow and rain happens usually in December.

The tender climate, mineral sources, and the curative mud allow opportunities for rest and cure within the region. Here there are 21 health-centers and medicated pensions, 10 rest homes, recreation departments and rest camps for children.

The Dnipropetrovsk Oblast has a wide range of flora and fauna with over 1700 kinds of vegetation and 7500 kinds of animals (including the elk, wild boar, dappled deer, roe, hare, fox, wolf, etc.). There are 114 parks and nature objects, including 15 state reserves; 3 nature memorials, 24 local parks; 7 landscape parks; 3 park tracts, which altogether make up approximately 260 square kilometres.

217 rivers flow within the area, including 55 rivers which are longer than 25 km, the major one being the Dnieper, which crosses through the center of the oblast. Also flowing through the region are two major reservoirs, the Kamianske and Dnieper, while the former Kakhovka Reservoir was drained in 2023 following the destruction of the Kakhovka Dam and the subsequent restoration of the Great Meadow. A major channel in the region is the Dnipro — Kryvyi Rih Canal.

== Economy ==
The Dnipropetrovsk Oblast has a high industry potential. There are 712 basic industrial organizations, including 20 different types of economic activity with about 473,4 thousand workers. The area also produces about 16.9% of the total industry production of Ukraine. This places the Dnipropetrovsk Oblast second in Ukraine (after the neighbouring Donetsk Oblast).

Dnipro is a major industrial centre of Ukraine. It has several facilities devoted to heavy industry that produce a wide range of products, including cast-iron, rolled metal, pipes, machinery, different mining combines, agricultural equipment, tractors, trolleybuses, refrigerators, different chemicals and many others. The most famous and the oldest (founded in the 19th century) is the Metallurgical Plant named after Petrovsky. The city also has big food processing and light industry factories. Many sewing and dress-making factories work for France, Canada, Germany and Great Britain, using the most advanced technologies, materials and design. Dnipro also formerly dominated in the aerospace industry since the 1950s: engineering department Yuzhnoye Design Bureau and construction at Pivdenmash.

Pivdenmash, the former Yuzhmash, is a manufacturer of space rockets, agricultural equipment, buses, trolley buses, trams, wind turbines, and satellites that was inherited from the Soviet Union. It is a large state-owned company located in Dnipro.

Dniproavia, an airline, has its head office on the grounds of Dnipropetrovsk International Airport. The region possesses major deposits of iron ore and some other metallurgical ores. To exploit them, several large mining companies were founded here in the middle of the 20th century. Most of them are located in Kryvyi Rih itself, which is the longest city in Europe. Steel companies of the region (except Mittal Steel-owned Kryvorizhstal) are controlled by either the Privat Group or the SCM. From the 1990s until 2004, these once united and state-owned industries went through a hard and scandal-ridden process of privatization. Being a business oligarch entity, Privat Group controls some prominent Ukrainian media, maintains close relations with politicians and sponsors professional sports. Key businesses of the group (including the PrivatBank itself) are based in Dnipropetrovsk Oblast, which is regarded as its "homeland". Group's founding owners are natives of Dnipropetrovsk and made their entire career there.

ArcelorMittal Kryvyi Rih, owned by ArcelorMittal since 2005 is the largest private company by revenue in Ukraine, producing over 7 million tonnes of crude steel, and mined over 17 million tonnes of iron ore. As of 2011, the company employed about 37,000 people. 4 Iron Ore Enrichment Works of Metinvest are a large contributors to the UA's balance of payments. The third giant — Evraz mining company.

== Education ==
=== Colleges and universities ===
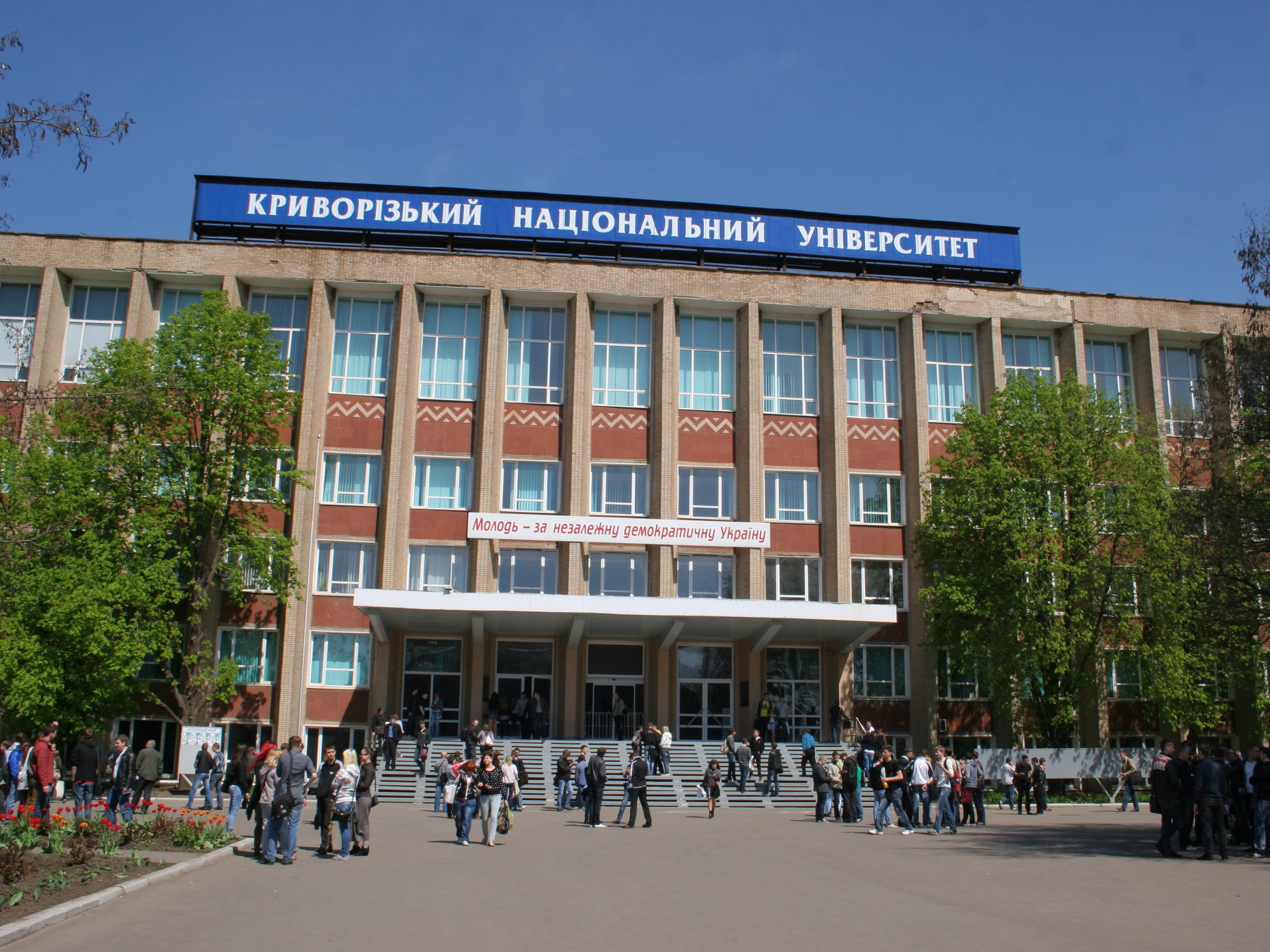
Kryvyi Rih National University

The oblast has several colleges and universities:

1. Dnipro State Medical University
2. Alfred Nobel University
3. Oles Honchar Dnipro National University
4. Dnipro Polytechnic
5. State Chemical Technology University of Ukraine
6. Dnipro Institute of Infrastructure and Transport
7. Prydniprovska State Academy of Civil Engineering and Architecture
8. Dnipro State University of Internal Affairs
9. National Metallurgical Academy of Ukraine
10. Dnipro Medical Institute of Conventional and Alternative Medicine
11. Dniprovskyi State Technical University
12. Kryvyi Rih National University
13. Kryvyi Rih State Pedagogical University
14. Kryvyi Rih State University of Economics and Technology

== Sport ==
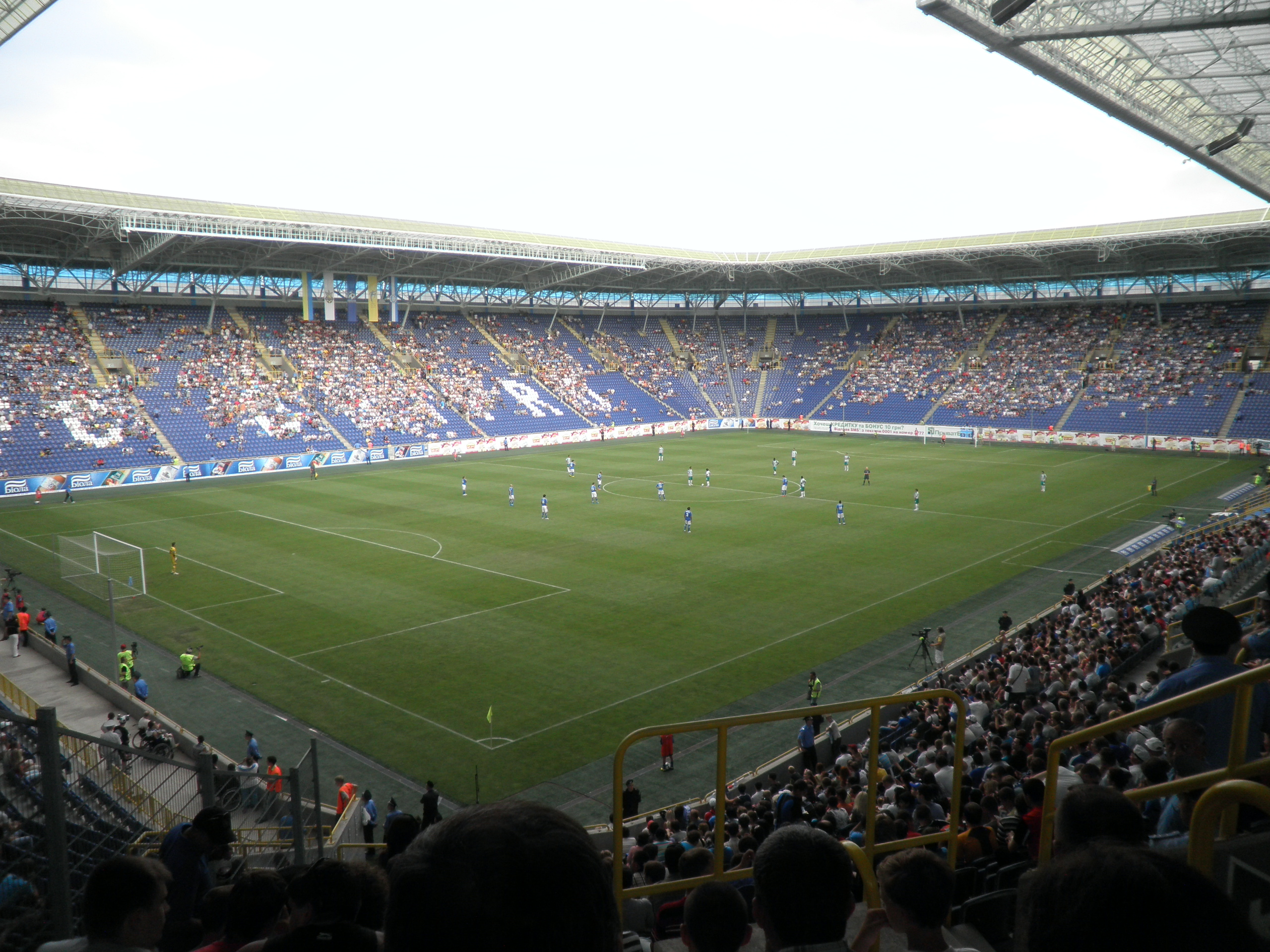
Dnipro Arena in Dnipro.

Region houses the Ukrainian Premier League football club, FC Dnipro. This club, commonly seen as representing the city at large, holds a record for being the only Soviet team to win the USSR Federation Cup twice; since independence they have gone on to win the Ukrainian Championship once and the Ukrainian League Cup three times. Kryvyi Rih was home to the football team Kryvbas Kryvyi Rih. FC Hirnyk Kryvyi Rih is a club based in Kryvyi Rih. The club currently competes in the Ukrainian First League. It is part of the Sports Club Hirnyk which combines several other sections. The club's owner is the Kryvyi Rih Iron Ore Combine (KZRK), the biggest subterranean mining public company in Ukraine. SC Kryvbas is a professional basketball club. Achievements of the team are winning the Ukrainian Basketball League in 2009, and winning the Higher League in 2003 and 2004. Since 2010 the team is active in the Ukrainian Basketball SuperLeague.

Recently built Dnipro-Arena has a capacity of 31,003 people. The Dnipro-Arena hosted the 2010 FIFA World Cup qualification game between Ukraine and England on 10 October 2009. The Dnipro Arena was initially chosen as one of the Ukrainian venues for their joint Euro 2012 bid with Poland. However, it was dropped from the list in May 2009 as the capacity fell short of the minimum 33,000 seats required by UEFA.

Dnipropetrovsk has a regional federation within Ukrainian bandy and Rink Bandy Federation.

== Culture ==
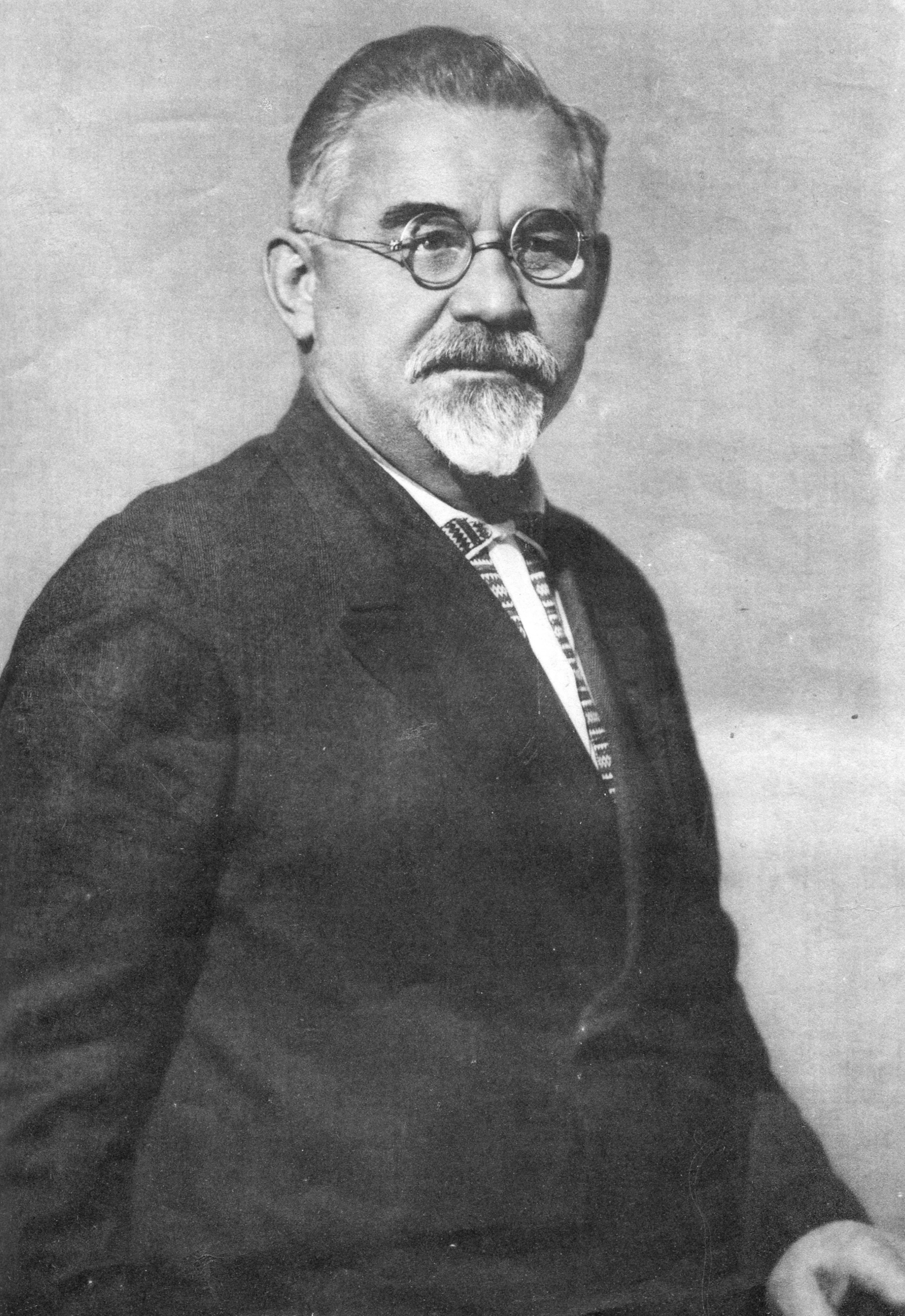
The oblast is named after the Communist leader of Ukraine Grigory Petrovsky and is thus to be renamed

Historically, Dnieper Ukraine comprised territory that roughly corresponded to the area of Ukraine within the expanding Russian Empire. Ukrainians sometimes call it Great Ukraine (Velyka Ukraina). Historically, this region is tightly entwined with the history of Ukraine and is considered the heart of the country.

Ukrainian (67,0%) and Russian (31,9%) language are both used, with Russian being more common in cities, while Ukrainian is the dominant language in rural communities. These details result in a significant difference across different survey results, as even a small restating of a question switches responses of a significant group of people.

Petrykivka painting, originating from the village of Petrykivka, is known for its distinctive features such as patterns, unusual technique and white background. It was included to the UNESCO Representative List of the Intangible Cultural Heritage of Humanity.

== Notable people from Dnipropetrovsk Oblast ==
- Helena Blavatsky — Russian occultist, philosopher, and author who co-founded the Theosophical Society
- Leonid Brezhnev — General Secretary of the Central Committee of the Communist Party of the Soviet Union
- Marharyta Dorozhon — Ukrainian/Israeli Olympic javelin thrower
- Ihor Kolomoyskyi
- Tihon Konstantinov — Moldavian SSR and Moldavian ASSR politician
- Leonid Kuchma — second President of independent Ukraine
- Yulia Tymoshenko — politician and businesswoman
- Pavlo Lazarenko — former Prime Minister of Ukraine
- Viktor Pinchuk
- Mykola Malyshko — sculptor and artist
- Mikhail Nekrich
- Oksana Baiul — figure skater; 1993 World champion and 1994 Olympic champion in ladies' singles
- The Lubavitcher Rebbe — Orthodox rabbi, and third Rebbe (spiritual leader) of the Chabad Lubavitch chasidic movement
- Samuel Seidlin — endocrinologist and nuclear medicine pioneer
- Dmytro Yavornytsky
- Valeriy Lobanovskyi
- Oleksandr Oksanchenko — fighter pilot killed in the Battle of Kyiv in 2022
- Oles Honchar
- Olexander Paul
- Volodymyr Zelenskyy — current President of Ukraine
- Dnipropetrovsk Maniacs — serial killers

== Landmarks ==
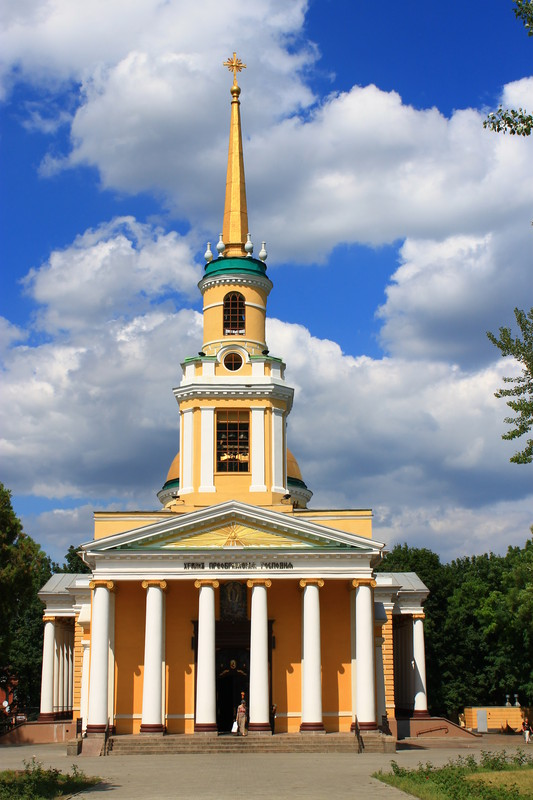
The Saviour's Transfiguration Cathedral

The following historical-cultural sites were nominated to the Seven Wonders of Ukraine.

- Tomb of kosh otaman Sirko
- Troitsk Cathedral
- Church of Virgin Mary Birth
- The walls of Ukrainian defensive line
- Kurgan stelae or Balbals are anthropomorphic stone stelae, images cut from stone, installed atop, within or around kurgans (i.e. tumuli), in kurgan cemeteries, or in a double line extending from a kurgan. The stelae are also described as "obelisks" or "statue menhirs". Spanning more than three millennia, they are clearly the product of various cultures. The earliest are associated with the Pit Grave culture of the Pontic—Caspian steppe (and therefore with the Proto-Indo-Europeans according to the mainstream Kurgan hypothesis). There are Iron Age specimens are identified with the Scythians and medieval examples with Turkic peoples. Such stelae are found in large numbers in Dnipro, Kherson and Nikolaev.
- Kodak fortress was a fort built in 1635 by the order of Polish king Władysław IV Vasa and the Sejm over the Dnieper River, near what was to become the town of Stari Kodaky (by modern day: Dnipro). It was constructed by Stanisław Koniecpolski to control Cossacks of Zaporizhian Sich, prevent Ukrainian peasants from joining forces with the Cossacks and guard the southeastern corner of the Polish—Lithuanian Commonwealth. The Poles tried to establish order in that area, and commissioned French military cartographer and engineer William le Vasseur de Beauplan to construct it. The fortress cost around 100,000 Polish zlotys. The dragoon garrison was commanded by the French officer Jean de Marion. Soviet government attempted to destroy the remnants of the fortress in order to eradicate traces of Polish influences on Ukraine by setting a quarry on that site in 1944. The quarry was closed in 1994, but at that time two-thirds of the fortress had been destroyed. Today the site is just ruins, but it is a popular tourist attraction.
- The Saviour's Transfiguration Cathedral (Ukrainian: Спасо-Преображенський кафедральний собор) is the main Orthodox church of Dnipro, Ukraine. The foundation stone was laid in 1786 by Catherine II of Russia and Emperor Joseph II. The event is described in the memoirs of comte de Ségur. Prince Grigory Potemkin envisioned the church as one of the spiritual centres of New Russia. Ivan Starov submitted to Potemkin his designs for a Roman-style basilica, but construction was postponed until the end of the Russo-Turkish War.

== Symbols ==
Cossack with musket of the Zaporizhian Host

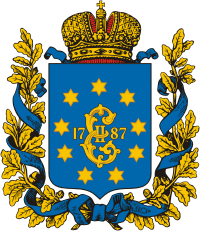
Coat of Arms of Yekaterinoslav Governorate

A Cossack with a musket was an emblem of the Zaporizhian Host and later the state emblem of the Hetmanate and the Ukrainian State. The origin of the emblem is uncertain, while its first records date back to 1592. On the initiative of Pyotr Rumyantsev the emblem was phased out and replaced by the Russian double-headed eagle in 1767.

A Cossack with a rifle was restored by the Hetman of Ukraine Pavlo Skoropadsky in 1918. However, later the emblem disappeared again until in 2005 it reappeared on the proposed Great Seal of Ukraine. In 2002 was adopted the flag and identical coat of arms of the Oblast, which consists of cossack with musket and nine yellow eight-pointed stars. Stars represent coat of arms of Yekaterinoslav Governorate which also consisted of imperial monogram of Catherine the Great.

The official plants are wheat, acanthus and oak. The motto of the oblast is Per aspera ad astra.

== Gallery ==
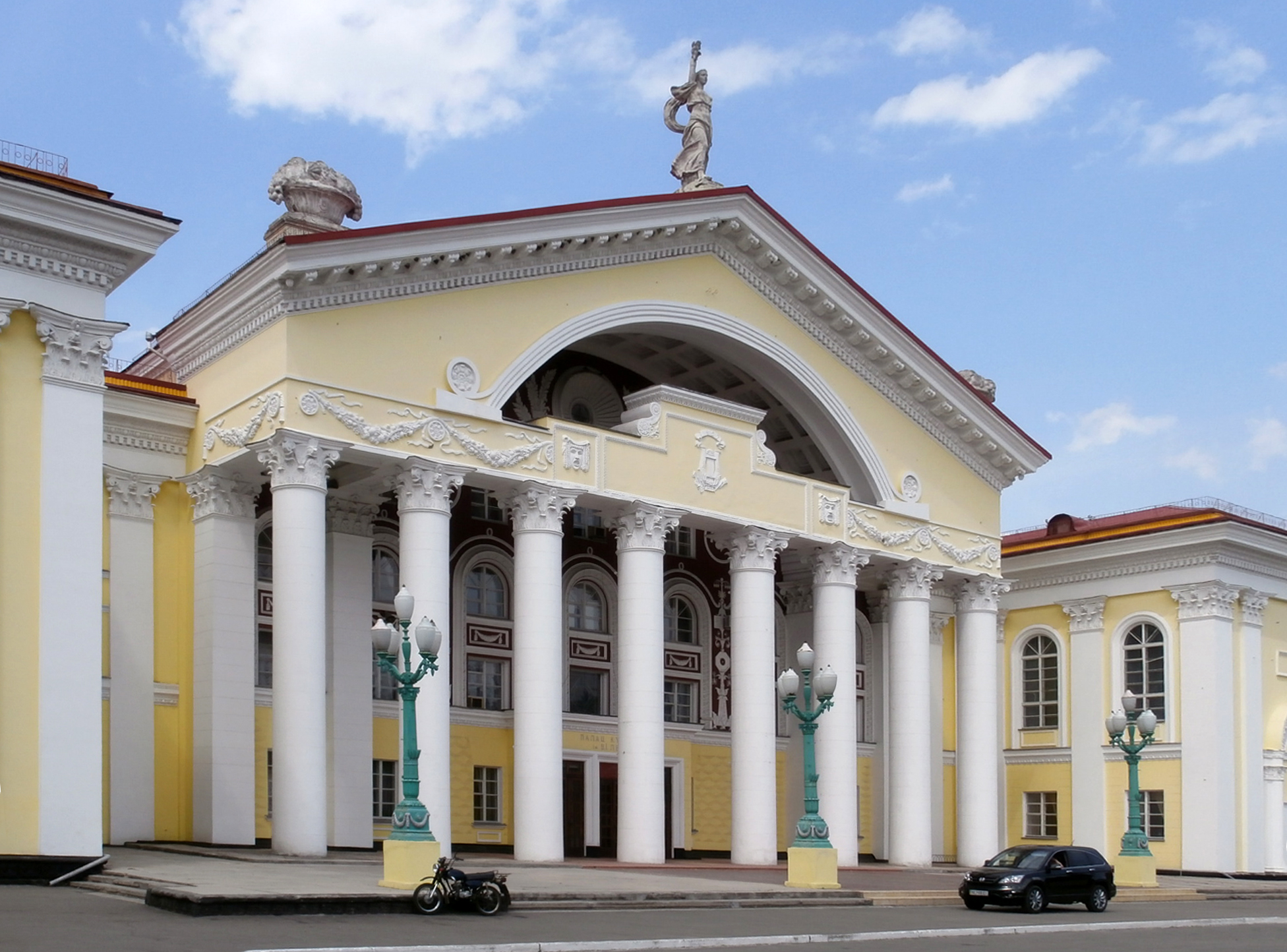
Palace of Culture in Zhovti Vody

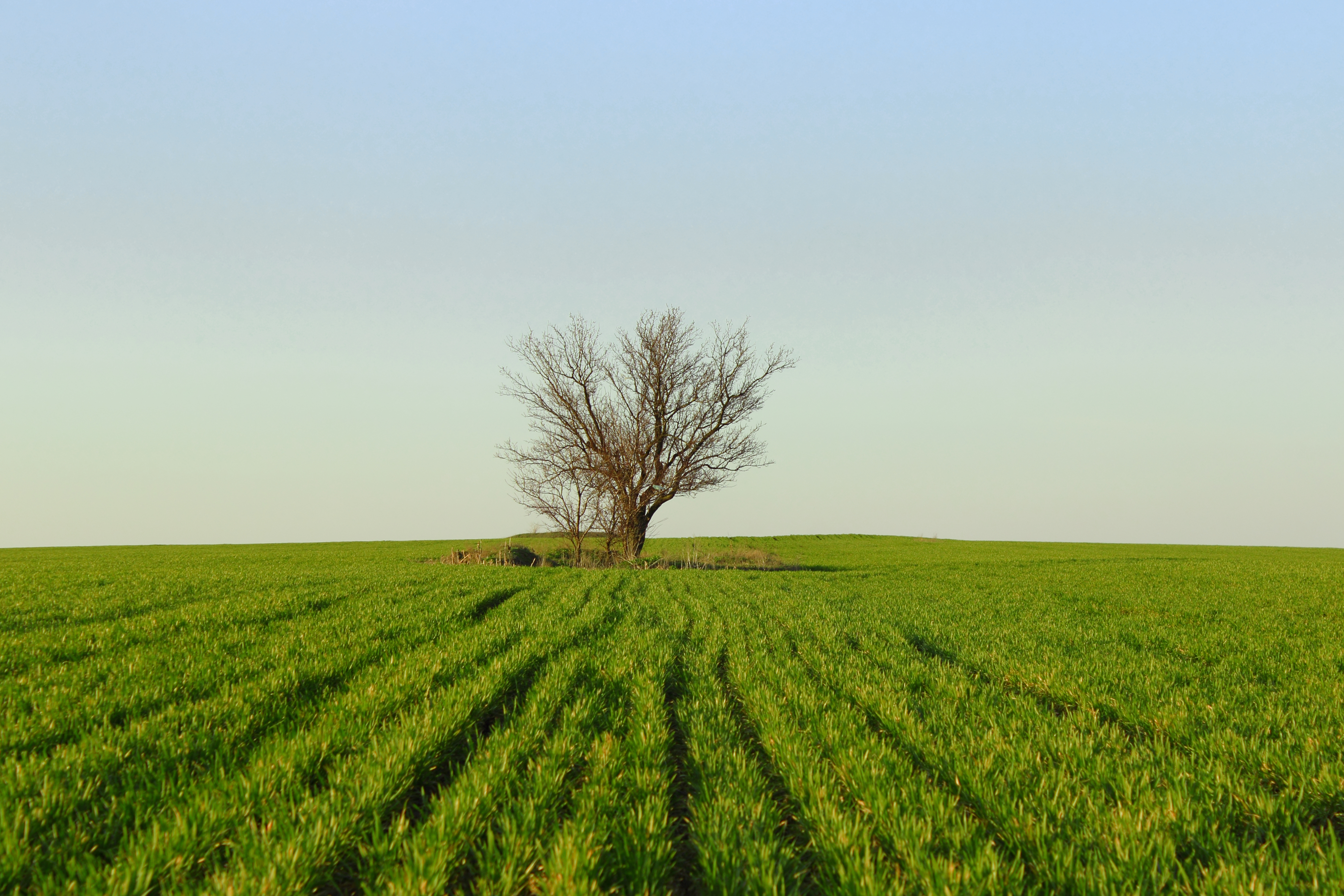
Family allotments

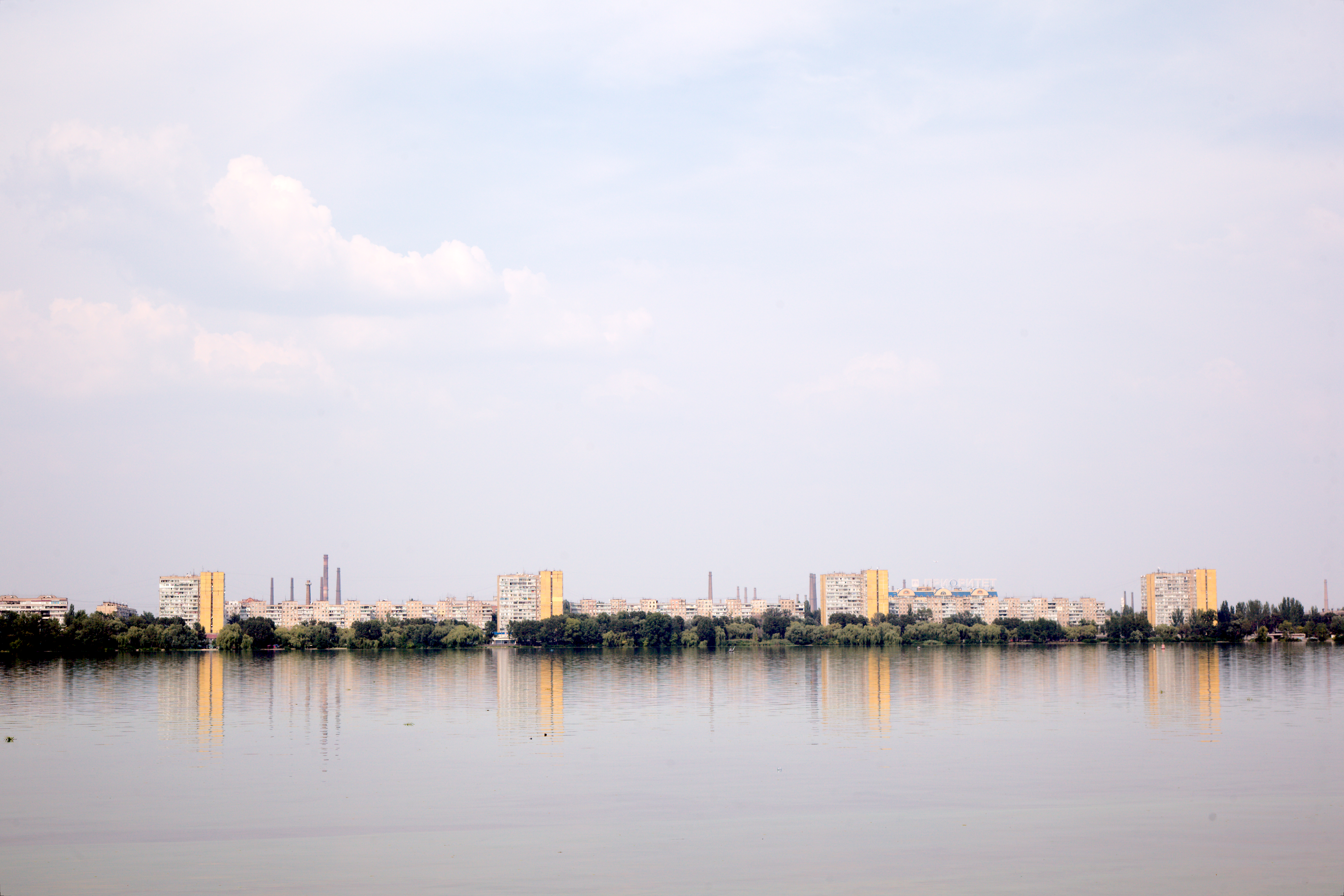
Dnieper river

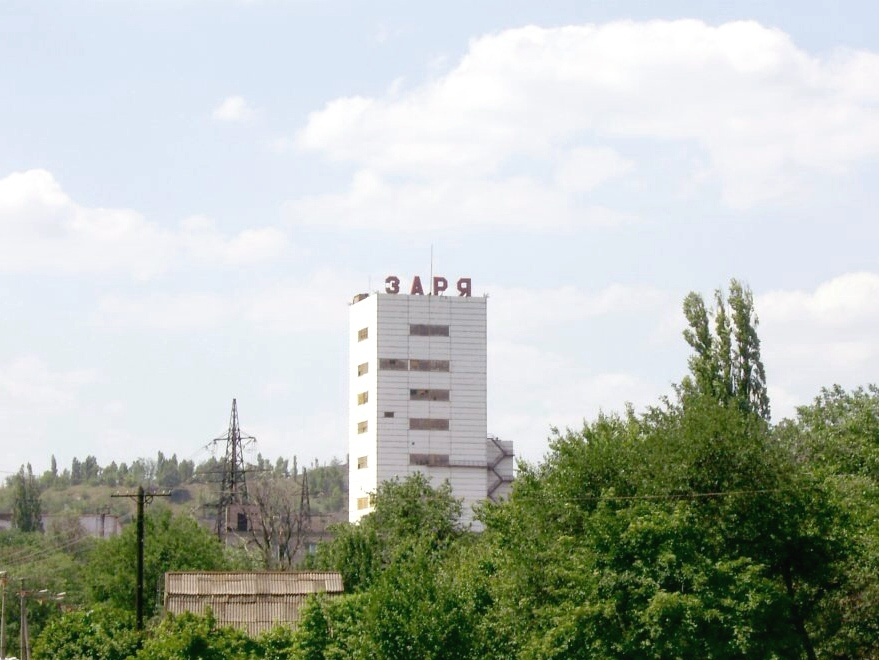
Pokrovska mine in Kryvyi Rih

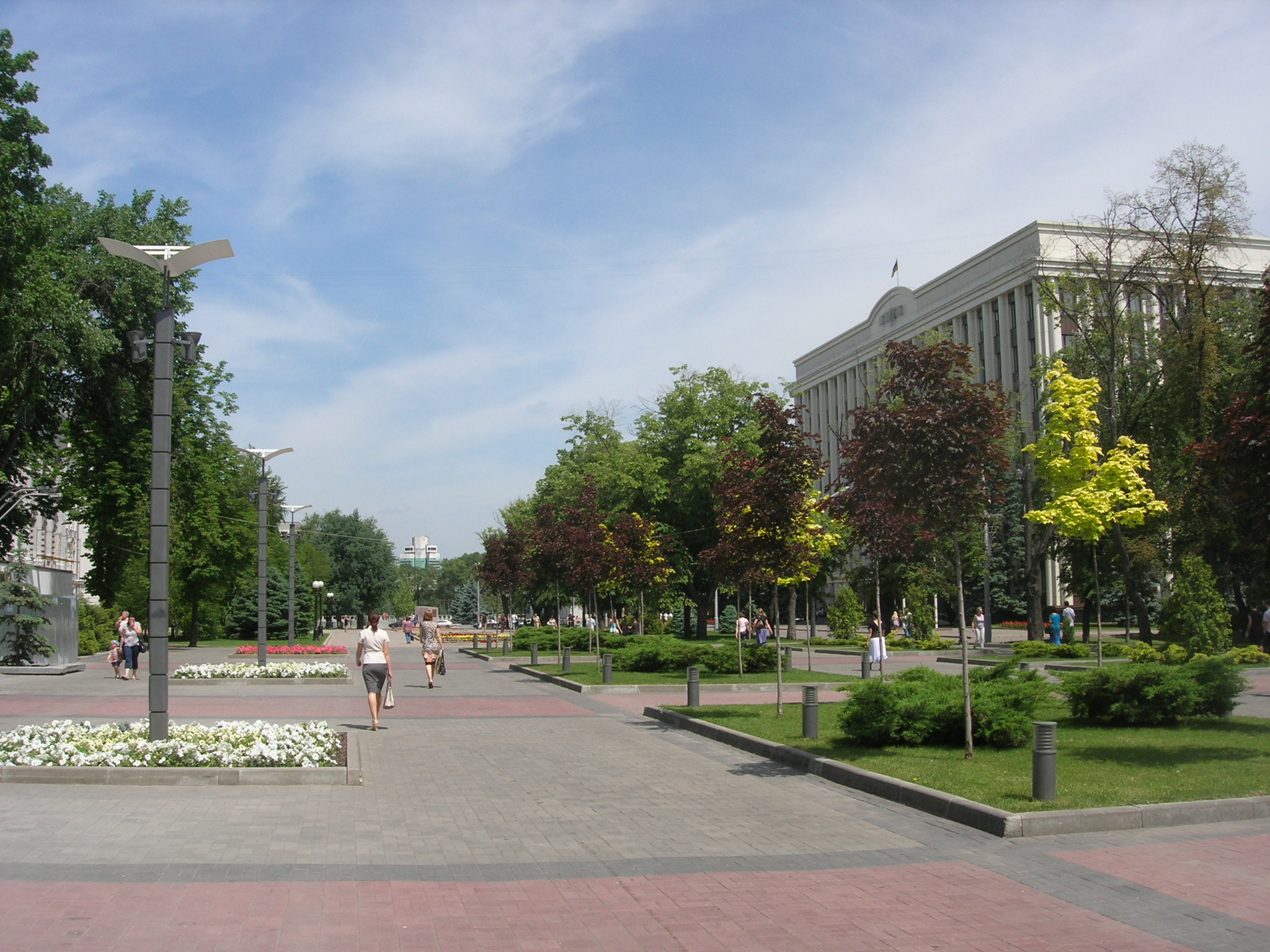
Dnipropetrovsk Regional State Administration

== See also ==
- Subdivisions of Ukraine
- Privat Group
