= Semyon Zelenskyy =

Soviet-Ukrainian infantryman (1924–1993)

- Born: 5 May 1924; Kryvyi Rih, Ekaterinoslav Governorate, Ukrainian SSR, USSR
- Died: 10 June 1993 (aged 69); Kryvyi Rih, Dnipropetrovsk Oblast, Ukraine
- Children: 1 (Oleksandr Zelenskyy)
- Military career
- Branch: Red Army; MVD
- Rank: Colonel
- Conflicts: World War II
- Awards: Order of the Red Star (x2)

Semyon (Simon) Ivanovich Zelensky (Ukrainian: Семен Іванович Зеленський; 5 May 1924 – 10 June 1993) was a Soviet-Ukrainian infantryman and law enforcement official, who was the paternal grandfather of the 6th President of Ukraine, Volodymyr Zelenskyy, and father of the head of the Kryvyi Rih State University's Department of Cybernetics and Computing Hardware, Oleksandr Zelensky.

== Biography ==
He was born in Kryvyi Rih, in the Ekaterinoslav Governorate of the Ukrainian SSR, He is of Jewish origin. During the Second World War, joined the Red Army, enlisting in the summer of 1941 and graduating from a military academy the following year. Over the course of the war, he was the commander of a mortar platoon, and then the commander of a rifle company of the 174th Guards Motor Rifle Regiment of the 57th Guards Motor Rifle Division. In this capacity, he took part in the Nikopol–Krivoi Rog offensive. In 1944, he received two Orders of the Red Star. He ended the war with the rank of Guards Lieutenant. By the end of the war, his three brothers had been killed during the Holocaust in Ukraine, and both of his parents were killed after the Wehrmacht burned their home to the ground.

== Post-war ==
After the end of the war, Zelenskyy transferred to the service of the Ministry of Internal Affairs of the Soviet Union. He met his wife, and not too long after had their son Oleksandr in late 1947. He held the position of Deputy Head of the Criminal Investigation Department of the Kryvyi Rih Department of Internal Affairs, under the Ministry of Internal Affairs of the Ukrainian SSR. He retired with the rank of colonel. He died on 10 June 1993, in the city of his birth. He was buried at the Vsebratsky Cemetery.
