= Oleksandr Zelenskyy =

Ukrainian mining scientist (born 1947)

- Олександр Зеленський
- Born: 23 December 1947 (age 78); Kryvyi Rih, Dnipropetrovsk Oblast, Ukrainian SSR, Soviet Union
- Education: Kryvyi Rih State University
- Known for: Father of Volodymyr Zelenskyy
- Spouse: Rymma Zelenska
- Children: Volodymyr Zelenskyy
- Relatives: Olena Zelenska (daughter-in-law)
- Scientific career
- Fields: Electrical engineering
- Workplaces: Department of Cybernetics and Computing Hardware of Kryvyi Rih State University of Economics and Technology
- Thesis: "Methodological foundations of surveying support for planning and accounting of production in the information system of ore quarry management" (2003)

Oleksandr Semenovych Zelenskyy (Ukrainian: Олександр Семенович Зеленський; born 23 December 1947) is a Ukrainian mining scientist and mathematician, who specializes in the automation of geological and surveying support. He is a professor and a doctor of technical sciences. Zelenskyy has been the head of the Kryvyi Rih State University's Department of Cybernetics and Computing Hardware since 1995. His son, Volodymyr Zelenskyy, is currently serving as the 6th President of Ukraine.

== Early life and family ==
Oleksandr Semenovych Zelenskyy was born in Kryvyi Rih, Soviet Ukraine, on 23 December 1947. He is of Jewish origin. He is married to Rymma Zelenska (born 16 September 1950). He is the father of Ukrainian President Volodymyr Zelenskyy (born 1978).

His father, Semyon (Simon) Ivanovych Zelenskyy, served in the Red Army's 57th Guards Motor Rifle Division during World War II. Semyon's father and three brothers were killed in the Holocaust.

== Academic career ==
Oleksandr Zelenskyy earned his bachelor's degree in electrical engineering from the Kryvyi Rih State University in 1972. In 1983, he defended his dissertation at the Moscow State Mining University, titled "Automated calculation of iron ore reserves in the ICS quarry." Zelenskyy has been the head of the Kryvyi Rih State University's Department of Cybernetics and Computing Hardware since 1995. Zelenskyy used his prior scientific research to create an automated mining management system for Erdenet, a joint Mongolian-Russian company which develops one of the world's largest copper-molybdenum deposits. He worked with the company for over 20 years.
