= Nekrich =

Nekrich is a Jewish surname. Notable people with the surname include:

- Alexander Nekrich (1920–1993), Russian historian.
- Mikhail Nekrich, modern Ukrainian musician.
- Natalia Nekrich
