= Kryvyi Rih National University =

Public university in Kryvyi Rih, Ukraine

Coordinates: 47.9055°N 33.4013°E

- Криворізький національний університет
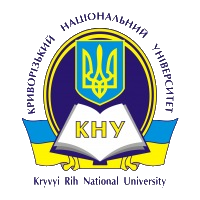
- Type: Public
- Established: 2011 (1922 as Technic University)
- Affiliations: Ministry of Education and Science of Ukraine
- President: Yuriy Vilkul
- Rector: Mykola Stupnik
- Academic staff: 900
- Students: 20,000
- Location: Kryvyi Rih, Ukraine
- Campus: urban
Colors
- Website: knu.edu.ua/en

Kryvyi Rih National University (Ukrainian: Криворізький національний університет, romanized: Kryvorizkyi natsionalnyi universytet) is a public university located in Kryvyi Rih, Ukraine. It consists of seven faculties and five institutes. The university was founded in 1922 as the Kryvyi Rih Evening Working College, and reorganized onto Kryvyi Rih Mining University. During the Soviet era, Kryvyi Rih University was one of the top professional universities in the USSR. In 2011 the Cabinet of Ukraine founded Kryvyi Rih National University by uniting Technic University, State Pedagogical University, Institute of Economics and also Institute of Metallurgy (a branch of National Metallurgical Academy of Ukraine at that moment).

== History ==
In 1929 the college was converted into an evening working institution, and from 1931 to the Kryvyi Rih Mining Institute.

The following year in Kryvyi Rih, the Institute of Vocational Training was founded. It was reorganized as the Pedagogical Institute. In the prewar period, the institute trained about 1,000 teachers. In 1999, the basis of the State Pedagogical Institute was established as Kryvyi Rih State Pedagogical University.

During World War II, having been evacuated from 20 September 1941 to August 1944, the Kryvyi Rih Mining Institute relocated to Nizhny Tagil, Russia. In September 1944 the Institute resumed classes for the students in its original location. It increased the number of specialties, which prepared the engineering staff. Five of its academics have been honored with the Lenin or State Prizes. In 1994 the institute became a charter technical university.

The proclamation of the independence of Ukraine in 1991 brought about radical changes in every sphere of university life. In 2011 the Ukrainian government founded Kryvyi Rih National University by uniting the Mining Institute, Pedagogical University, Economic Institute of Kyiv National Economic University and the Department of the National Metallurgical Academy of Ukraine.

== Organisation and administration ==
=== Schools / Faculties ===
These are the 7 faculties into which the university is divided:

- Mining Faculty,
- Geological and Environmental Faculty,
- Information Technologies Faculty,
- Mechanical Engineering Faculty,
- Building Faculty,
- Electrical Engineering Faculty,
- Transportation Faculty.

=== Institutes ===
- Research Mining Institute,
- Research Institute of Ecology and safety in the mining and metallurgical industry.

=== Other institutes ===
- Industrial College,
- Polytechnic College,
- Ingulets College,
- Kryvyi Rih Mining College,
- Mining Electromechanical College,
- Motor Transport Technical College.

== Academics ==
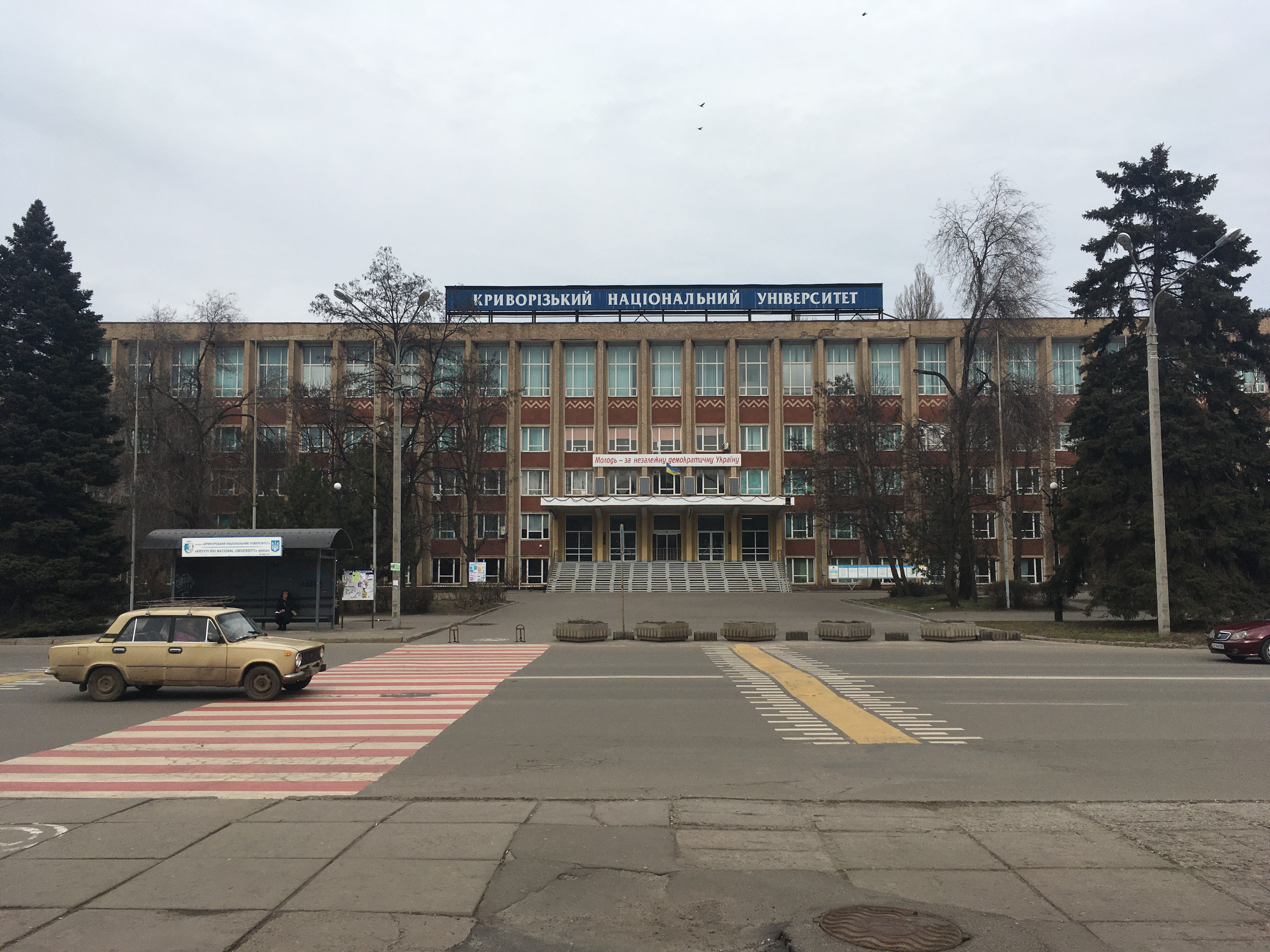
KNU main campus building.

=== Foreign Partner Universities ===
The university currently maintains relations and, in some cases, student exchange programs with universities of forty countries; a figure which includes a number of former republics of the Soviet Union and other countries which Ukraine traditionally, over the past 70 years prior to independence in 1991, did not have official bilateral relations with. A small selection of partner universities is displayed below.

Country	University	Country	University
Belarus	Belarus State University	Vietnam	Ho Chi Minh City University of Technology
Morocco	University of Hassan II Casablanca	Germany	Ruhr University Bochum
Germany	Dresden University of Technology	Poland	Silesian University of Technology
Russia	Moscow State Mining University	Poland	Rzeszów University

== Campus ==
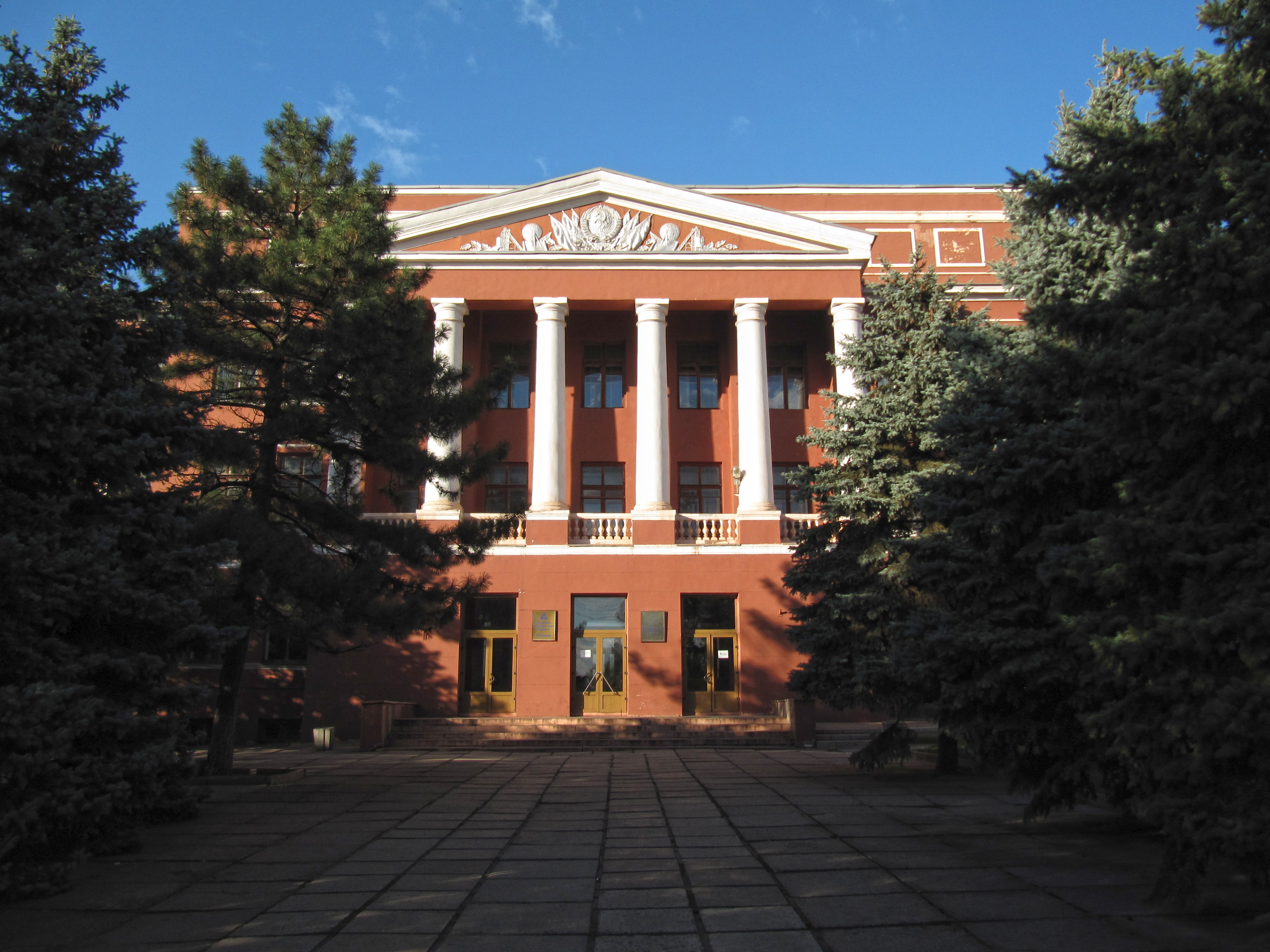
University's original building

=== Library ===
The library of KNU originated in 1922. The library holds over 1.7 million physical volumes, and more than 7,000 of these books are referred as rare and valuable. Library staff are making great efforts to promote reading. Regularly held book exhibitions, literature reviews, readers' conferences, thematic and literary evenings, book presentations, meetings with famous people in the city, including writers and journalists.

More than 500,000 readers visit the library each year, and it loans more than 1 million books annually. Digital access to library started to work on 2005.

== Notable alumni and faculty ==
- Mykhailo Korolenko
- Oleksandr Vilkul
- Petro Dyminskyi
- Olena Zelenska

== See also ==
- List of universities in Ukraine
