= Kryvbas (disambiguation) =

Kryvbas is a historical region of Ukraine.

Kryvbas may also refer to:

- FC Kryvbas Kryvyi Rih (disambiguation)
- FC Kryvbas-2 Kryvyi Rih
- HK Kryvbas, an ice hockey club from Kryvyi Rih, Ukraine
- Kryvbas, a village in Kryvyi Rih Raion
- 40th Motorized Infantry Battalion (Ukraine)
