= Samuel Seidlin =

Samuel M. Seidlin (1 May 1895 - 1955) was Russian-born American endocrinologist who pioneered the field of nuclear medicine by using radioiodine for diagnosis and therapy of thyroid cancer during the early 1940s.

== Early life ==
Samuel Seidlin was born in Dnipropetrovsk Oblast, Ukraine, to Martin S Seidlin and Sima Seidlin. He was brought to New York City as a child. He earned his MD in 1923 at Columbia University Vagelos College of Physicians and Surgeons and served as an intern and junior staff member at Johns Hopkins Hospital in Baltimore.

== Career ==
Seidlin established the Medical Physics Research Laboratory at Montefiore Hospital and its Endocrine Clinic in 1943. In the same year, at Montefiore Hospital in New York City, building on the success of Dr Saul Hertz's use of radioactive iodine to treat Graves' Disease, Seidlin consulted with Dr. Hertz regarding the use of RAI in the treatment of thyroid carcinoma. Dr Seidlin administered radioiodine to a patient, and used the radioisotope to locate the several metastases from adenocarcinoma of the thyroid. Seidlin continued as chief of the Endocrine Clinic and the Medical Physics Research Laboratory at Montefiore and treated 23 patients for metastatic thyroid cancer with radioiodine, utilizing from reactors for most of them.

== Sources ==
1. Hertz, S (1946). "A Plan for Analysis of the Biological Factors Involved in Experimental Carcinogenesis of the Thyroid by Means of Radioactive Isotopes". West J Surg Obstet Gynecol. 54 (12). Greenwich CT: 487–489. PMID 20251138.
2. Seidlin, S M; Marinelli, L D; Oshry, E (1946). "RADIOACTIVE IODINE THERAPY – Effect on Functioning Metastases of Adenocarcinoma of the Thyroid". JAMA. 132 (14). AMA: 838–847. doi:10.1001/jama.1946.02870490016004. PMID 20274882.
3. Siegel, E (1999). "The beginnings of radioiodine therapy of metastatic thyroid carcinoma: a memoir of Samuel M. Seidlin, M. D. (1895-1955) and his celebrated patient". Cancer Biotherapy & Radiopharmaceuticals. 14 (2): 71–79. doi:10.1089/cbr.1999.14.71. PMID 10850290.
4. Surks, Martin J (2012). "Milestones in Thyroid Research at Einstein and Montefiore: 1920-2011". Division of Endocrinology & Diabetes. Yeshiva U. Archived from the original on 16 September 2017.
