= Kryvbas =

Historical region in Ukraine

Coordinates: 48°00′N 33°25′E

Kryvbas may also refer to the FC Kryvbas Kryvyi Rih, the football team in Kryvyi Rih. See also Kryvbas (disambiguation)

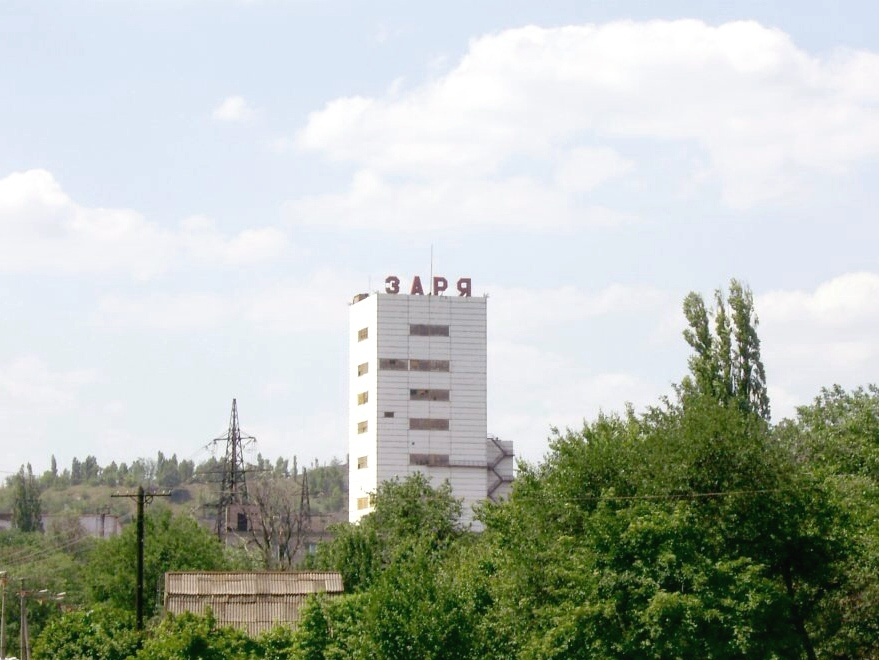
Mine "Pokrovska" in Kryvyi Rih

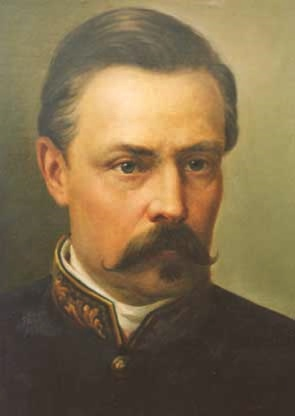
Alexander Pol (local industrialist and forefather of the modern iron mining)

Kryvyi Rih Iron Ore Basin (Ukrainian: Криворізький залізорудний басейн, romanized: Kryvorizkyi zalizorudnyi besein; Russian: Криворожский железорудный бассейн), commonly known by the portmanteau Kryvbas (Ukrainian: Кривбас; Russian: Кривбасс, romanized: Krivbass), is an important economic and historical region stretched between central and southern Ukraine around the city of Kryvyi Rih, specializing in iron ore mining, steel industry and some uranium ore mining in the past 20th century. It is arguably the main iron ore region of Eastern Europe.

== Geography ==
Named after the city of Kryvyi Rih, the basin occupies the western part of the Dnipropetrovsk Oblast, as well as some small parts of the neighboring Kirovohrad and Mykolaiv oblasts, in a valley of Inhulets and Saksahan rivers (both are tributaries of the Dnipro). It stretches by a narrow strip (2–7 km) from north to south almost for 100 km from the town Zhovti Vody (lit. 'Yellow Waters') to latitudes of the Dnipro river with total area of 300 sq km.

== Facts ==
Kryvbas is a major center of heavy industry in Ukraine. The region has major deposits of iron ore and some other metallurgical ores. To exploit them, the first international mining companies were founded there in the late 19th century, replaced by several larger ones founded in the middle of the 20th century, most of them located in Kryvyi Rih.

Kryvyi Rih city itself has 45 iron ore mines, 41 quarries, 89 stockpiles, 26 collapse and displacement zones, 15 tailings dams, 27 spelestological objects (opened old adits, drifts, mines, winzes, failed wells, etc.), 6 energy, 5 metallurgical, 28 machine-building and 5 chemical enterprises.

== Modern history ==
ArcelorMittal Kryvyi Rih is the largest and most up-to-date steel company in the region, and in the country. It includes ore facilities and a major steel mill (the only one in the city). Other ore companies supply their raw materials to either AMKR or steel mills outside the region.

With the exception of AMKR, owned by ArcelorMittal, the steel companies of the region are controlled by either Rudomain LLC or Metinvest. These were once state-owned industries. From the 1990s until 2004, after Ukraine declared independence and worked to establish capitalism, these industries went through difficulties and scandals as they became privatized.

A major beneficiation works Kryvyi Rih Mining and Processing Plant of Oxidized Ores (KRMPPOO) (Ukrainian: Криворізький гірничо-збагачувальний комбінат окиснених руд, romanized: KGZKOR) was under construction in the early 21st century in the neighboring town of Dolynska (Kirovohrad Oblast). This hi-tech project is co-funded by the governments of Ukraine, Romania and Slovakia. In January 2022 it was announced that locally based company Rudomain LLC acquired the Ukraine-owned share in the project.

== See also ==
- Kryvyi Rih metropolitan area
- Donets Basin
