= Ternovka crater =

Terny crater
- Location within Ukraine Location within Europe
- Location: Kryvyi Rih, Dnipropetrovsk Oblast, Ukraine; 48°8′31″N 33°33′10″E

Impact crater structure
- Confidence: Confirmed
- Diameter: 11 km (6.8 mi)
- Age: 280 ± 10 Ma; Early or Middle Permian
- Exposed: No
- Drilled: Yes
- Bolide type: Chondrite

Ternivsky crater or Ternovsky crater (*outmoded) is a meteorite crater named after the locality Terny in the northern outskirts (Ternivskyi District) of Kryvyi Rih and also Kryvyi Rih Raion in Ukraine.

It is 11 km in diameter and the age is estimated to be 280 ± 10 million years (Permian). The crater is not exposed at the surface.
