= Hannivka, Kryvyi Rih Raion, Dnipropetrovsk Oblast =

Hannivka Ганнівка
- Village
- Location of Hannivka within Dnipropetrovsk Oblast Hannivka (Ukraine)
- Coordinates: 47°30′55″N 33°18′6″E
- Country: Ukraine
- Oblast: Dnipropetrovsk Oblast
- Raion: Kryvyi Rih Raion
- Hromada: Shyroke settlement hromada
- Elevation: 25 m (82 ft)

Population
  - Total: 236

Hannivka is a village in Kryvyi Rih Raion, Dnipropetrovsk Oblast, Ukraine on the Dnipropetrovsk Oblast-Kherson Oblast border.

== History ==
=== Russian invasion of Ukraine ===
During the 2022 Russian invasion of Ukraine, Hannivka was occupied on 16 March 2022.. Hannivka was reported liberated on 11 May 2022.

Russian forces shelled Hannivka with Grad missiles on 21 March 2022.

On 9 May 2022, Russia shelled Hannivka.

On 23 July 2022, Russia shelled Hannivka.
