= Alexander Pol =

Russian geologist (1832–1890)

- Aлександр Поль
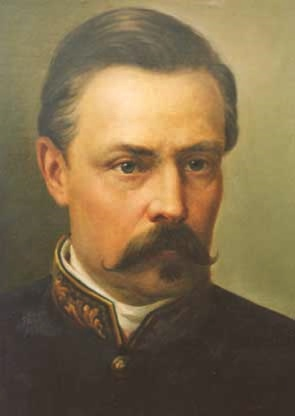
- Born: 20 August 1832; Maloaleksandrovka, Russian Empire
- Died: 26 July 1890 (aged 57); Yekaterinoslav, Russian Empire
- Education: Imperial University of Dorpat
- Occupations: Archaeologist; geologist; ethnographer; businessman
- Known for: Discovery of the Kryvbas mining region
- Awards: Order of Saint Stanislaus

Alexander Nikolayevich Pol (Russian: Александр Николаевич Поль; 20 August 1832 – 26 July 1890) was a Russian archaeologist, geologist, ethnographer and businessman of Baltic German descent. He is best-known for discovering Kryvbas, a major iron ore region of Eastern Europe.

== Biography ==
Alexander Pol was the descendant of a noble family of Baltic Germans on his father's side, and of a well-known Ukrainian Cossack starshyna family on his mother's side. He was a distant relative of the Polubotok and Poletika families. He was born in Maloaleksandrovka, in Yekaterinoslav Governorate of the Russian Empire (present-day Ukraine). Pol attended local schools before studying at the Imperial University of Dorpat (present-day Tartu, Estonia), where he graduated. He studied geology and archeology.

Pol studied the iron ore of Krivoy Rog (present-day Kryvyi Rih, Ukraine) for 15 years and proved its industrial importance. He is credited with discovering the Kryvbas, a major iron ore region, and is most well-known for this. While studying ore deposits, he also made archeological findings and related them to his interest in ethnography.

Pol contributed to the industrialization of the town and its area. In 1881, industrial development began, stimulating the rapid economic growth of Krivoy Rog and, more broadly, of Yekaterinoslav Governorate.

== Sources ==
- "Поль, Александр Николаевич" . Brockhaus and Efron Encyclopedic Dictionary (in Russian). 1906.
