= Mykola Malyshko =

Ukrainian sculptor and artist (born 1938)

- Микола Малишко
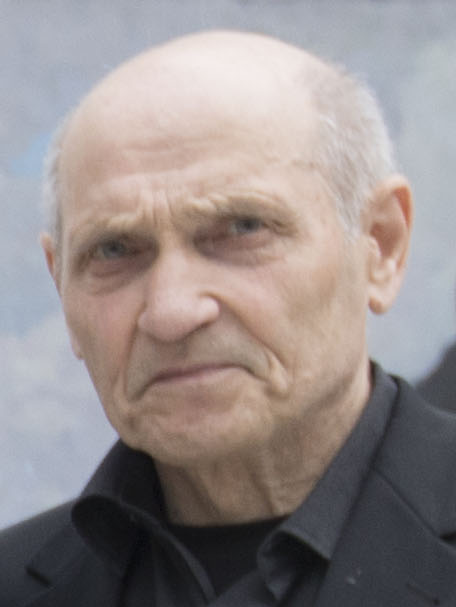
- Malyshko in 2017
- Born: 15 February 1938 (age 88); Znamenivka, Ukrainian SSR, Soviet Union
- Education: Kyiv National Art Institute
- Occupations: Sculptor; artist
- Spouse: Nina Denisova
- Awards: see §

Mykola Oleksiiovych Malyshko (Ukrainian: Микола Олексійович Малишко; born 15 February 1938) is a Ukrainian sculptor and teacher who became a member of the National Union of Artists of Ukraine in 1976, and a laureate of the Shevchenko National Prize.

== Early life and education ==
Malyshko was born on 15 February 1938, in the Ukrainian village of Znamenivka. Since he was young, he had a soft spot for the historical art. He traveled to Kaliningrad, where his brother Anton is employed as a drama theater artist. He had his first creative experience by aiding his sibling. Malyshko graduated from Dnipropetrovsk Art School in 1961, and received his degree from the Kyiv National Art Institute in 1967. He works in the fields of monumental art, graphics, and easel painting. He worked briefly in Mariupol after graduating from the institute.

== Artistry ==
Malyshko is sensitive to the passing of time, its minute variations, and live contemporary forms of reality. He sees it as his task to discover a shape that has significance rather than just brilliant expressive tools. He believed that the creative personality is a means of bridging the gaping holes that digitalization has made between man and nature, between life and art.

== Career ==
Malyshko obtains an apartment in Dnipropetrovsk, lands a position at the municipal executive committee's architectural and artistic workshop, and begins working on intriguing projects. Specifically, he designs in the Chkalov City Park and creates works upon request from the Art and Production Plant, which reports to the Ukrainian SSR Art Fund, in the cities of Pavlohrad and Ordzhonikidze.

Malyshko gets a block of land in the Malyutyanka, which is close to Brovary, in 1975, and he starts building a house on his own initiative. He joined the Union of Soviet Artists of Ukraine's monumental and ornamental branch a year later. The design of the front of the Kyiv National University's mechanical and mathematical building presents him with the opportunity to carry out an idea.

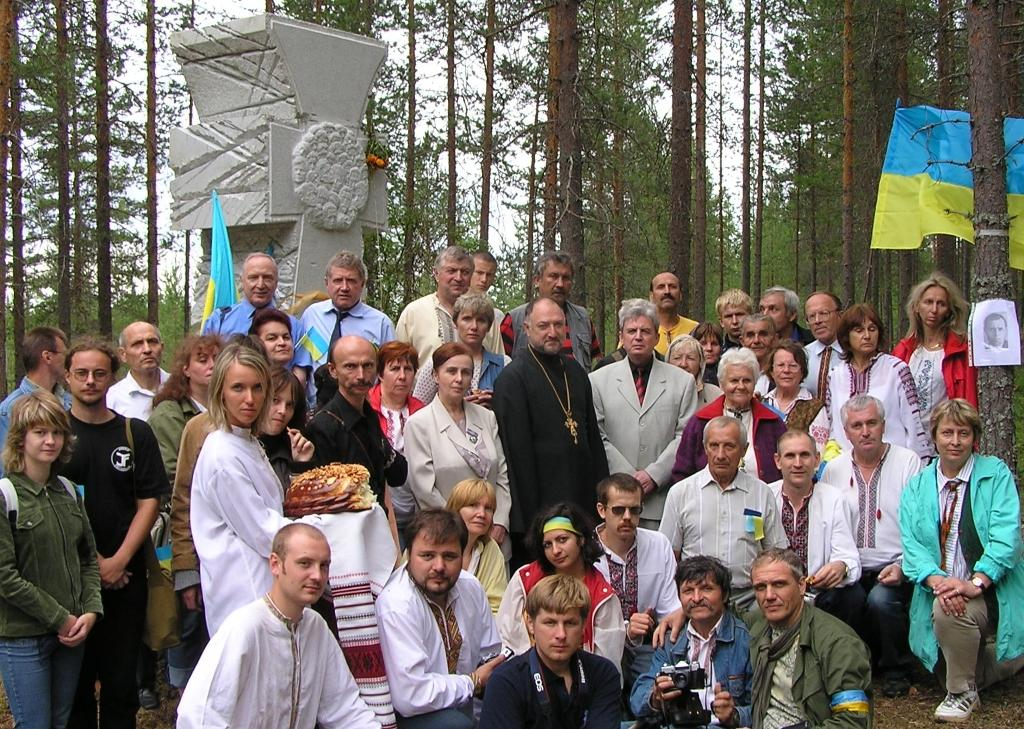
Malyshko (fourth from left) at the official opening of the Cossack Cross in 2005

In the early 1970s, Malyshko was a member of the unofficial art circle in Kyiv, together with Boris Plaksiy, Ivan Marchuk, Feodosiy Tetianych and others. Within their residences, the artists in this group hosted one-day exhibitions and discussions about their works with a selected number of friends. Along with Nina Denisova, and Petro Gonchar, they renovated a house on Andriivskyi Descent from 1987 to 1990, and the four of them would host workshops until 2007.

Malyshko has actively contributed to laying the groundwork for a new generation of Ukrainian wooden sculptors since 1993, showcasing his creations in exhibits in Germany, Hungary, and Austria. works in tandem with Mystetskyi Arsenal and the Я Галерея Art Center. His solo shows included Колір Середовище at the gallery Совіарт in 1999, Відлуння at the Ukrainian House in 2005, and Сила людського духу: Скульптура, живопис at the Museum of Modern Art of Ukraine.

Between 1998 and 2001, Malyshko collaborates with many painters to complete the paintings of the renovated St. Michael's Golden-Domed Monastery in Kyiv. Takes part in the Українське дерево exhibition at the Ukrainian House in Kyiv in 2005, making it the first time his sculptures are shown in the wide framework of Ukrainian wooden plastic from the Baroque to the present. He co-author (together with Nazar Bilyk) of the "Killed Sons of Ukraine" granite Cossack Cross project, which was erected in 2004 at the Sandarmokh monument in the Republic of Karelia. Among the artistic triumphs are the tomb crosses, which serve as memorials to notable soldiers for Ukraine's independence, and the memorial cross honoring the victims of the Holodomor-Genocide of 1933, which is situated in the hamlet of Myrivka in the Kaharlyk Raion of Kyiv Oblast.

Malyshko participated in the First Kyiv International Biennale of Contemporary Art Arsenale 2012 with sculptures. In the 2014 International Festival of Contemporary Art (FIAT) program, 14 wooden sculptures were on show in France at the Espace Croix Baragnon art gallery in Toulouse.

== Personal life ==
Malyshko is married to Nina Denisova (born 1942), an artist. He currently lives and works in the Kyiv Oblast.

== Awards and recognitions ==
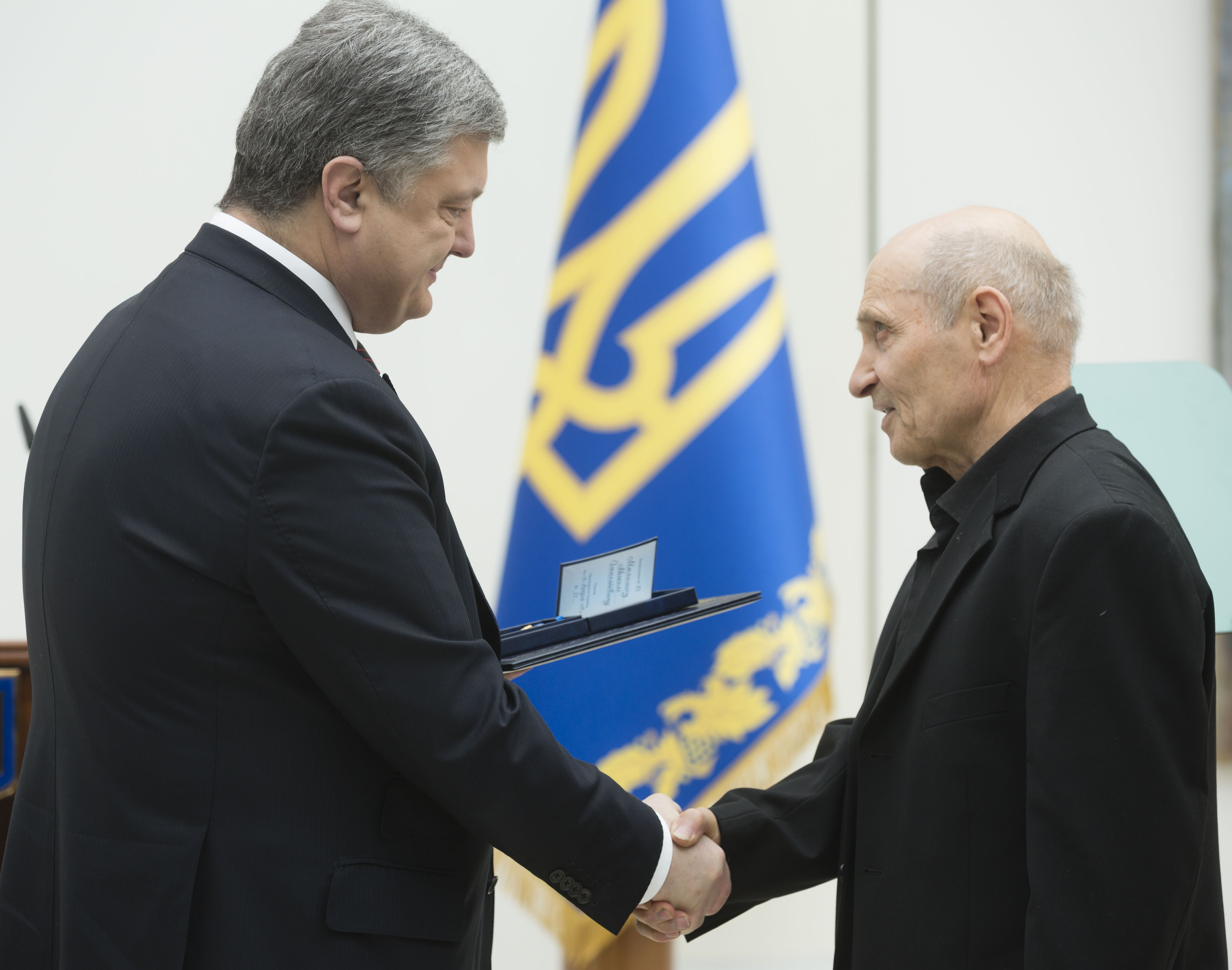
President Petro Poroshenko presenting Malyshko the Shevchenko National Prize in 2017

Malyshko has received awards and recognitions such as:

- Honored Artist of Ukraine (2009)
- Shevchenko National Prize (2017)
- Arsenale Awards of the First Kyiv Biennale of Contemporary Art (2012)
- Vasyl Stus Award (1998)
- Laureate in the nomination Artist of the Year, Golden Section (1997)
- Member of the Union of Soviet Artists of Ukraine (1976)
