= Masterok =

Ukrainian children's music band

Masterok (also spelled "Masterock"; Ukrainian: ВІА «Мастерок») is a children's musical collective from Dnipro, Ukraine. Founded in 1975 by composer, arranger, musician Mykhailo Nekrych, the band had numerous members (age 5–14) who contributed their young talents towards its success.

Masterok had countless TV and live appearances all over the world, as well as 5 vinyl LP records and 4 CD albums releases. The band always featured strong vocals, keyboards, guitars, woodwinds, bass, drums & percussion. .
Many former members have chosen the fields of music and art as their careers.

== Milestones of Masterok's career ==
- 1975 Mykhailo Nekrych holds first auditions for the band and discovers its first young stars
- 1986 Melodiya, a Soviet record label, releases the band's second LP, Funny Collection
- 1986 International Song Festival in Siedlce
- 1986 the band was chosen to stay and perform in Artek, Crimea
- 1986 International Rock Festival in Kyiv
- 2005 Atlantic releases Masterok's Christmas album Rejoice To Christ’s Birth!

== Former members (incomplete list) ==
- Andrey Romaniy - vocals
- Marina Kuleba - vocals, guitar
- Alexandr Levin - bass, vocals
- Svetlana Varjel - keyboards, vocals
- Elena Kuznetsova - keyboards, vocals
- Vitaly Shapovalov - keyboards, vocals
- Natalia Karyaka - keyboards, vocals
- Anastasia Biretz - keyboards, vocals
- Dmitri Rotmistrovsky - flute, vocals
- Yuri Ptashnikov - flute, drums, vocals
- Victoria Sevastianova - keyboards, vocals
- Olga Ishenko - bass
- Irina Spas'ko - vocals, guitar
- Vitaly Sedunov - vibraphone, drums, vocals
- Konstantin Diduch - guitar
- Dmitri Bolotov - guitar
- Vladimir "Shmaga" Rechtman - drums, vocals
- Anton Skhorochodov - drums, vocals
- Alyona Levin - vocals, keyboards
- Elena Kuznetsova Jr - keyboards, vocals
- Evgeny Kuchtin - bass
- Victoria Brekhar - vocals
- Alexandr Parubets - vocals
- Zhanneta Nekrich-Lopez - keyboard
- George Nekrich - violin, vocal

== Other professionals associated with the band ==
- Natalia Nekrich - répétiteur
- Boris Kaptselovich - sound
- Boris Glizer - theatrical director
- George Nekrich - music director
