= State University of Economics and Technology =

Public university in Kryvyi Rih, Ukraine

- Державний університет економіки і технологій
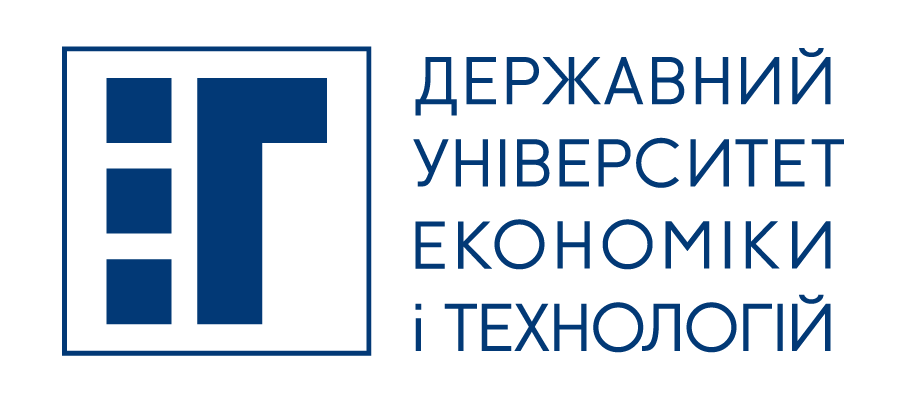
- Former name: Kryvyi Rih Institute of Economics
- Type: Public
- Established: 2020 (1966 as Donetsk Institute of Soviet Trade)
- Affiliations: Ministry of Education and Science of Ukraine
- Faculty: 370
- Students: 5,000
- Location: Kryvyi Rih, Ukraine
- Campus: urban
Colors
- Website: www.duet.edu.ua/en

State University of Economics and Technology, abbr. SUET, also formerly known as Kryvyi Rih Institute of Economics, abbr. KEI, is a state-sponsored university in Kryvyi Rih, Ukraine.

The school was founded in 1966 as a branch of Donetsk Institute of Soviet Trade. In 1977, it became a branch of Kyiv National Economic University (KNEU) (also it did later in 2016). In 2011, it became part of Kryvyi Rih National University (KNU). Then, in 2020 it was finally reestablished as SUET.

In 2011, the Cabinet of Ministers of Ukraine founded Kryvyi Rih National University by uniting Kryvyi Rih Technic University (KTU), Kryvyi Rih State Pedagogical University (KSPU), Kryvyi Rih Institute of Economics (KEI) and Kryvyi Rih Institute of Metallurgy (KMI) (formerly a branch of National Metallurgical Academy of Ukraine (NMetAU)).

In 2020, it was reinvigorated as Kryvyi Rih State University of Economics and Technology (SUET), after merging Kryvyi Rih Institute of Economics with Kryvyi Rih Institute of Metallurgy (formerly part of National Metallurgical Academy of Ukraine) and also four local colleges.

== Faculties ==
These are the 5 faculties into which the university is divided:

- Economics Institute
- Technological Institute
- Faculty of Information Technology
- Juridical Faculty
- Institute of Management and Business Education

== Notable alumni ==
- Volodymyr Zelenskyy, President of Ukraine

== See also ==
- List of universities in Ukraine
