= Kryvyi Rih State Pedagogical University =

Public university in Kryvyi Rih, Ukraine

Coordinates: 47.907377°N 33.411869°E

- Криворізький державний педагогічний університет
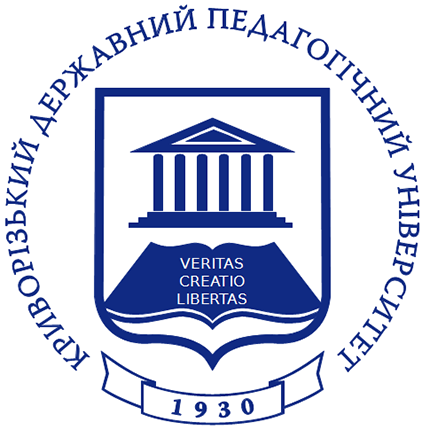
- Motto: Veritas, Creatio, Libertas
- Type: Public
- Established: 1930
- Affiliations: Ministry of Education and Science of Ukraine
- Rector: Yaroslav Shramko
- Faculty: 393
- Students: 6,000
- Location: Kryvyi Rih, Ukraine
- Campus: urban
Colors
- Website: http://kdpu.edu.ua/

The Kryvyi Rih State Pedagogical University (also referred to as KDPU) was a state-sponsored university located in Kryvyi Rih, Ukraine. It has roots dating back to 1930 and offers 29 departments and programs.

== History ==
=== 20th century ===
The university was founded in 1930 as a University of Vocational Training. In the prewar period, the university trained about 1,000 teachers. In 1999, on the basis of the State Pedagogical University, the Kryvyi Rih State Pedagogical University was established. The proclamation of the independence of Ukraine in 1991 brought about radical changes in every sphere of University life.

=== 21st century ===
In 2011, Cabinet of Ukraine founded Kryvyi Rih National University. It existed for 5 years and was divided into three separate institutions again in 2016.

== Administration ==
The university is administered in nine divisions — PhysMath, Biological, Geographical, Historical, Ukrainian philology, Foreign languages, Education and Fine Arts — and its faculty are divided into 29 departments and programs. Many of these programs are completed with a master's degree.

=== Faculties ===
- Faculty of Mathematics and Physics
- Faculty of Natural Sciences
- Ukrainian Philology Faculty
- Faculty of Foreign Languages
- Faculty of Education
- Faculty of Geography
- Faculty of History
- Faculty of Fine Arts (departments of graphic arts and of musical education)
- Faculty of Industrial Education

== Degree programs ==
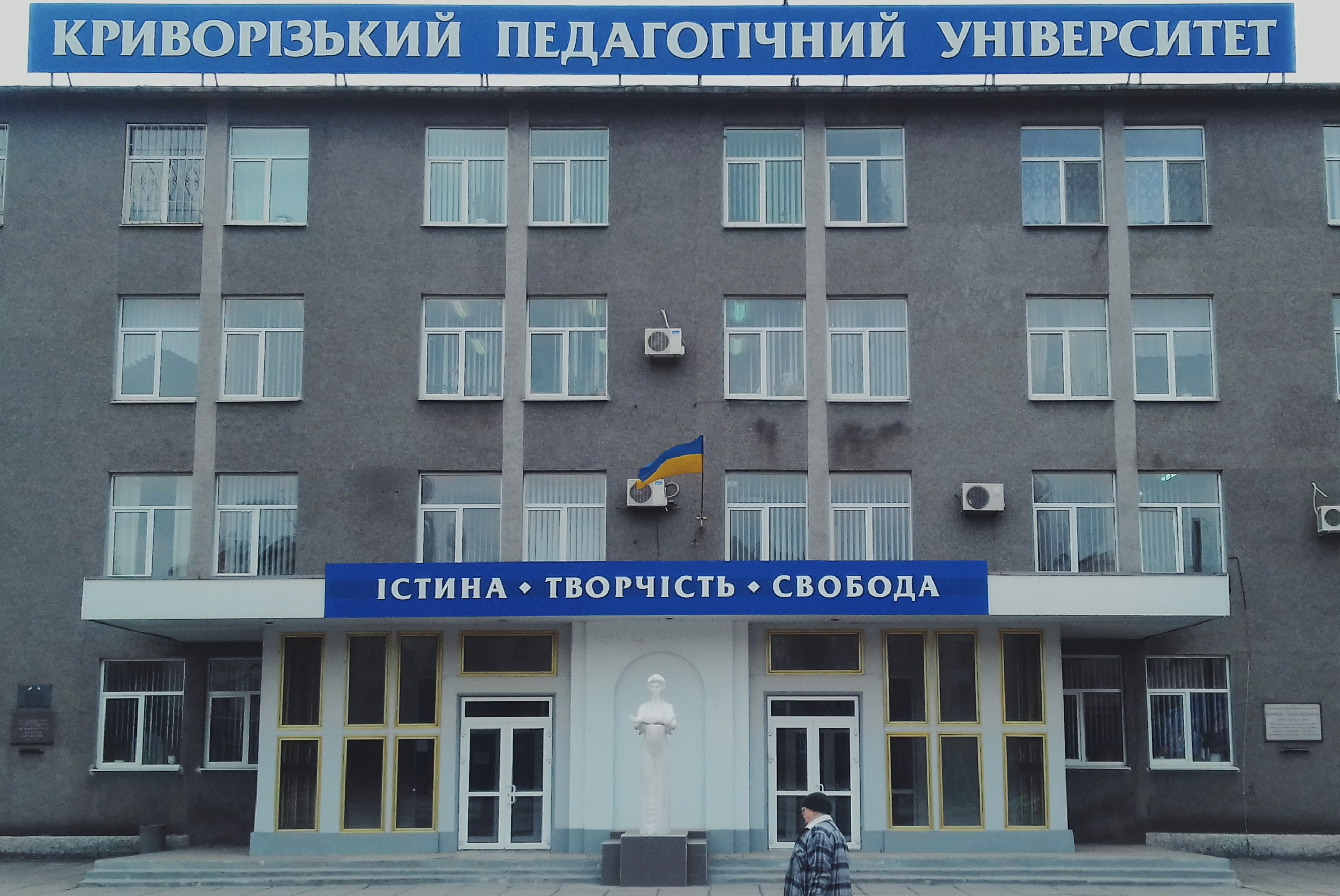
Campus building

The university administers 29 degree-granting programs. It also offers joint-degree programs with several of KNU's professional schools, as well as opportunities for advanced non-degree study.

== Scientific editions ==
Scientific journals of the university are published jointly with the Academy of Cognitive and Natural Sciences:

- Educational Dimension
- Educational Technology Quarterly
- CTE Workshop Proceedings
- Actual Problems of Mind

== See also ==
List of universities in Ukraine
