= List of Kryvyi Rih Metrotram stations =

The Kryvyi Rih Metrotram currently consists of 4 routes and 11 metro stations, with another additional station left abandoned and unfinished (Vovnopriadylna). The stations are listed geographically from north to south.

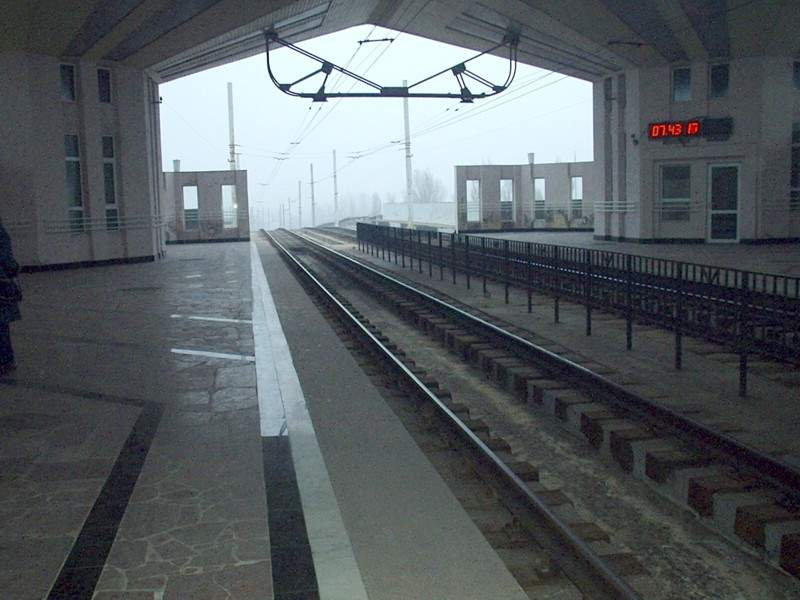
The Zarichna station is located above ground, with platforms running on either side of the tracks.

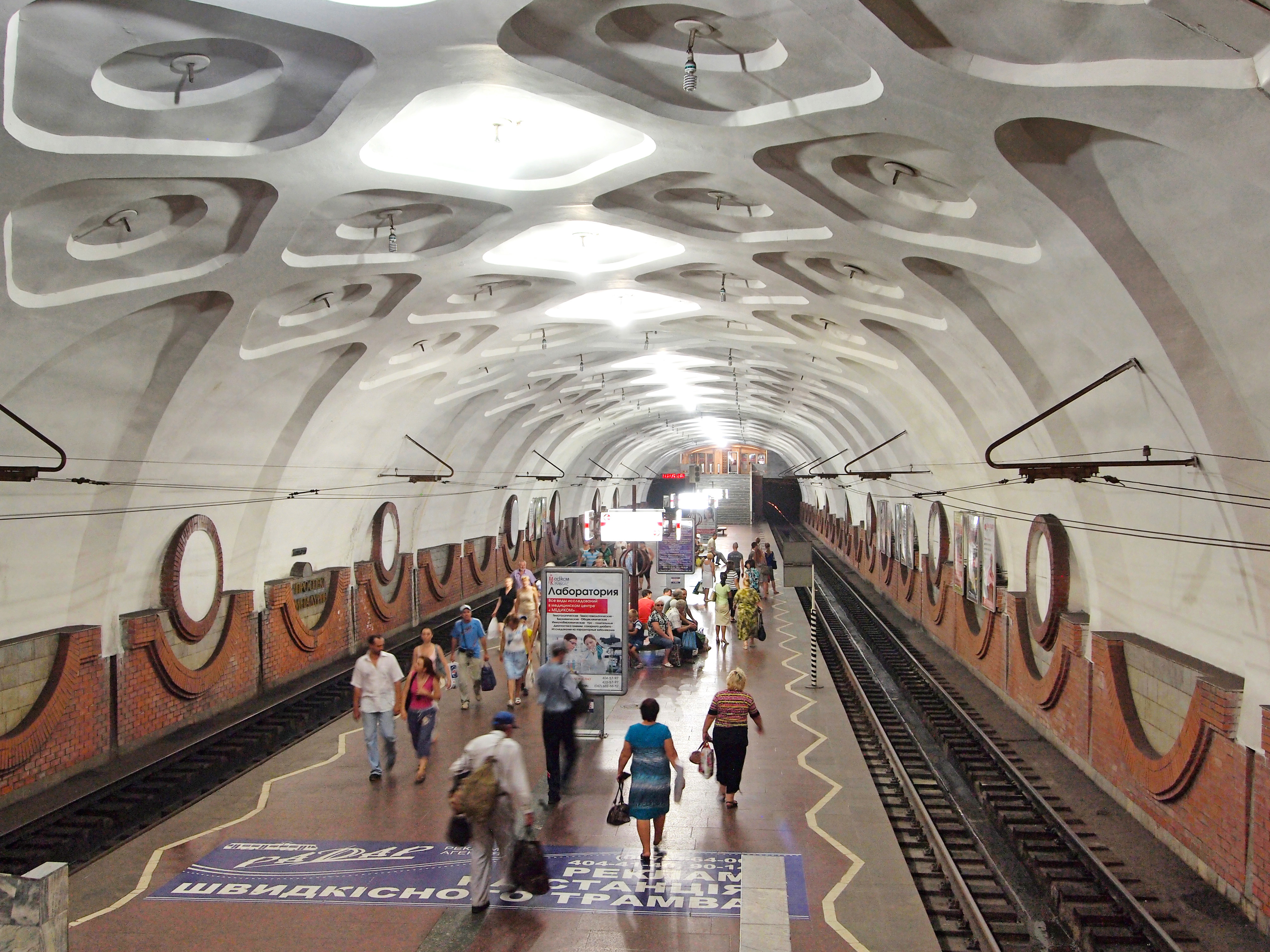
The Prospekt Metalurhiv station is a shallow, single-vault station.

Routes				Name	Date opened	Type	Prior names
	2М	3М	4М	Zarichna	1999	Elevated, enclosed, with platforms on either side of tracks	
	2М	3М	4М	Elektrozavodska	2000	Shallow, with platforms on either side of tracks	
	2М	3М	4М	Vovnopriadylna	Unfinished	Above ground, enclosed, with platforms on either side of tracks	
	2М	3М	4М	Industrialna	1999	Above ground, enclosed, with platforms on either side of tracks	
1М				Maidan Pratsi	1986	Above ground, exposed, located on a tram reversing loop	
1М	2М	3М	4М	Soniachna	1986	Elevated, enclosed, with platforms on either side of tracks	Zhovtneva (–2007), Imeni Hutovskoho (–2016)
1М	2М	3М	4М	Miska Likarnia	2001	Above ground, exposed, with platforms on either side of tracks	
1М	2М	3М	4М	Vechirnii Bulvar	1986	Shallow, with platforms on either side of tracks	Maidan Artema (–2016)
1М	2М	3М	4М	Mudriona	1986	Above ground, enclosed, single-vault station	Dzerzhynska (–2016)
1М	2М	3М	4М	Budynok Rad	1988	Shallow, single-vault station	
1М	2М	3М	4М	Prospekt Metalurhiv	1989	Shallow, single-vault station	
1М	2М			Kiltseva	1989	Above ground, exposed, located on a tram roundabout	
				Transfer from rapid tram to regular tram			
		3М	4М	KNEU	2012	Above ground, exposed	
		3М	4М	Druha Miska Likarnia	2012	Above ground, exposed	
		3М	4М	Stantsiia Kryvyi Rih	2017		
		3М	4М	Shkola No.15	2017		
		3М	4М	Persha Dilnytsia	2017		
		3М	4М	Trampark	2017		
		3М	4М	Miskkholodylnyk	2017		
		3М	4М	Selyshche Shevchenka	2017		
		3М	4М	Vulytsia Poliova	2017		
		3М	4М	Vulytsia Chumatskyi Shliakh	2017		
		3М	4М	Rudnychna	2017		
		3М	4М	Kolektyvni Sady	2017		
		3М	4М	Vulytsia Yaroslavska	2017		
		3М	4М	Rynok PivdHZK	2017		
		3М	4М	Prospekt Pivdennyi	2017		
		3М		Vulytsia Hruni Romanovoii	2017		
		3М		Vulytsia Yosypa Pachotskoho	2017		
		3М		Mahazyn Aistra	2017		
		3М		Vulytsia Zbahachuvalna (NKHZK)	2017		
			4М	Inhuletskyi Raivykonkom	2017		
			4М	TsNAP	2017		
			4М	PivdHZK	2017		
