= Tretia Dilnytsia (Kryvyi Rih Metrotram) =

Kryvyi Rih Metrotram station

General information
- Coordinates: 47.8844891°N 33.3916939°E
- System: Kryvyi Rih Metrotram
- Owner: Kryvyi Rih Metrotram

History
- Rebuilt: 25 May 2012

Services
Preceding station	Kryvyi Rih Metrotram	Following station
Kiltse KMK towards Vulytsia Zbahachuvalna	Route 3	Druha Miska Likarnia towards Zarichna
Location

Tretia Dilnytsia (Ukrainian: 3-я дільниця; Russian: 3-й участок, romanized: Tretiy Uchastok, "Third Sector") is a station of the Kryvyi Rih Metrotram. The station was originally part of the city's larger tram system, although it was incorporated into the metrotram route along with four other stations on 25 May 2012. It is a station on the metrotram's third route, running from Zarichna to Kiltse KMK.

The tram line reorganization was initiated in order to eliminate the need for transfer stops for the inhabitants traveling from Kryvyi Rih's northern neighborhoods to the southern end of town, near the ArcelorMittal Kryvyi Rih plant.

The Tretia Dilnytsia station is located above ground, with platforms running on either side of the metrotram's tracks.
