= Kryvyi Rih railway station =

Railway station in Kryvyi Rih, Ukraine

Kryvyi Rih Кривий Ріг
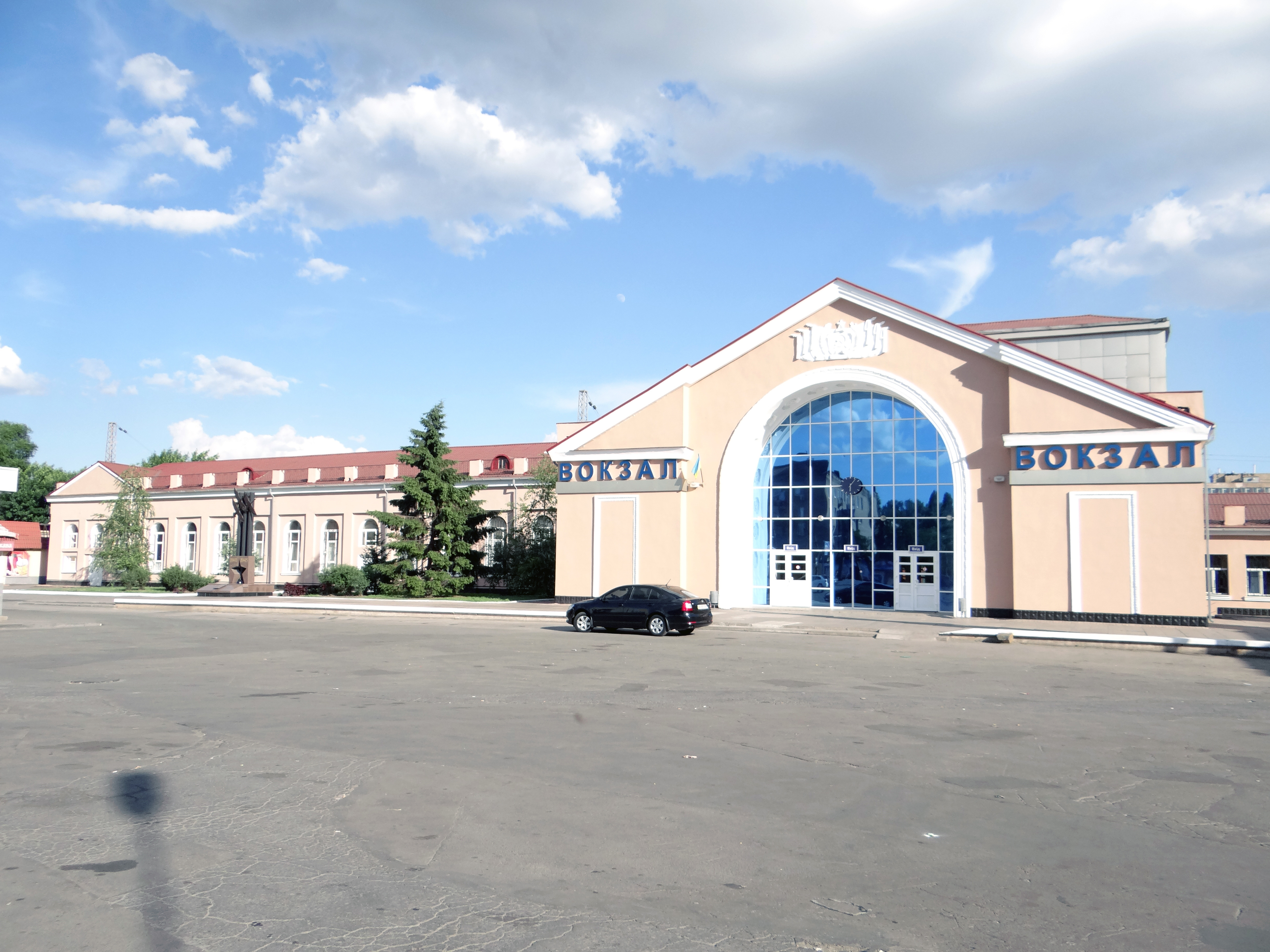
- View from the street outside

General information
- Location: Vokzalna Street, Metalurhiinyi District, Kryvyi Rih, Dnipropetrovsk Oblast, Ukraine
- Coordinates: 47.8859091°N 33.3777294°E
- Tracks: 11
- Connections: Kiltseva

Construction
- Parking: Yes

Other information
- Station code: 467201

History
- Opened: 1884

Services
Preceding station	Ukrainian Railways	Following station
Kryvyi Rih-Main Terminus	Kryvyi Rih–Apostolove	Kryvyi Rih-Western toward Apostolovo
Preceding station	Kryvyi Rih Metrotram	Following station
School No. 15 towards Vulytsia Zbahachuvalna	Route 3	Druha Miska Likarnia towards Zarichna
School No. 15 towards PivdHZK	Route 4	Druha Miska Likarnia towards Zarichna
Location

Kryvyi Rih (Ukrainian: Кривий Ріг; formerly known as Chervona) (Note: Ukrainian: Червона, lit. 'Red') is a passenger and freight railway station in Kryvyi Rih, Dnipropetrovsk Oblast, Ukraine. It is 1st-class freight railway station of the Prydniprovska Railways on the Kryvyi Rih main — Vysun line between the Kryvyi Rih main (6 km northeast) and Kryvyi Rih Zakhidnyi railway station (7 km west) stations. The station is located in the southern metallurgical district of the city, about 4 km apart from the city center.
