= KNEU (Kryvyi Rih Metrotram) =

Tram stop in Kryvyi Rih

Ekonomichnyi Instytut

General information
- Location: Medychna Street
- Coordinates: 47°53′16.9″N 33°23′11.3″E
- System: Kryvyi Rih Metrotram
- Owner: Kryvyi Rih City Council
- Operator: Kryvyi Rih Metro

History
- Rebuilt: 25 May 2012

Services
Preceding station	Kryvyi Rih Metrotram	Following station
Druha Miska Likarnia towards Vulytsia Zbahachuvalna	Route 3	Prospekt Metalurhiv towards Zarichna
Druha Miska Likarnia towards PivdHZK	Route 4	Prospekt Metalurhiv towards Zarichna
Terminus	Route 1 transfer at Kiltseva	Prospekt Metalurhiv towards Maidan Pratsi
Terminus	Route 2 transfer at Kiltseva	Prospekt Metalurhiv towards Zarichna
Location

Ekonomichnyi Instytut (Ukrainian: Економічний інститут, lit. 'Institute of Economics') is a tram stop of the Kryvyi Rih tramway network, and also the Kryvyi Rih Metro. The stop is originally part of the city's larger tram system, although it was incorporated into the metrotram route along with four other stations on 25 May 2012. It is on the metrotram's routes 3М 4М, running from Zarichna to tram stops Zbahachuvalna str. and PivdGZK respectively.

Passengers traveling through this tram stop can, through the underground vestibule of the station, transfer to the Kiltseva station, which runs metro routes 1М 2М. The station is named after Kryvyi Rih State University of Economics and Technology (SUET), formerly known as Kryvyi Rih Institute of Economics.
