= Miska Rada (Kryvyi Rih Metrotram) =

Kryvyi Rih Metrotram station

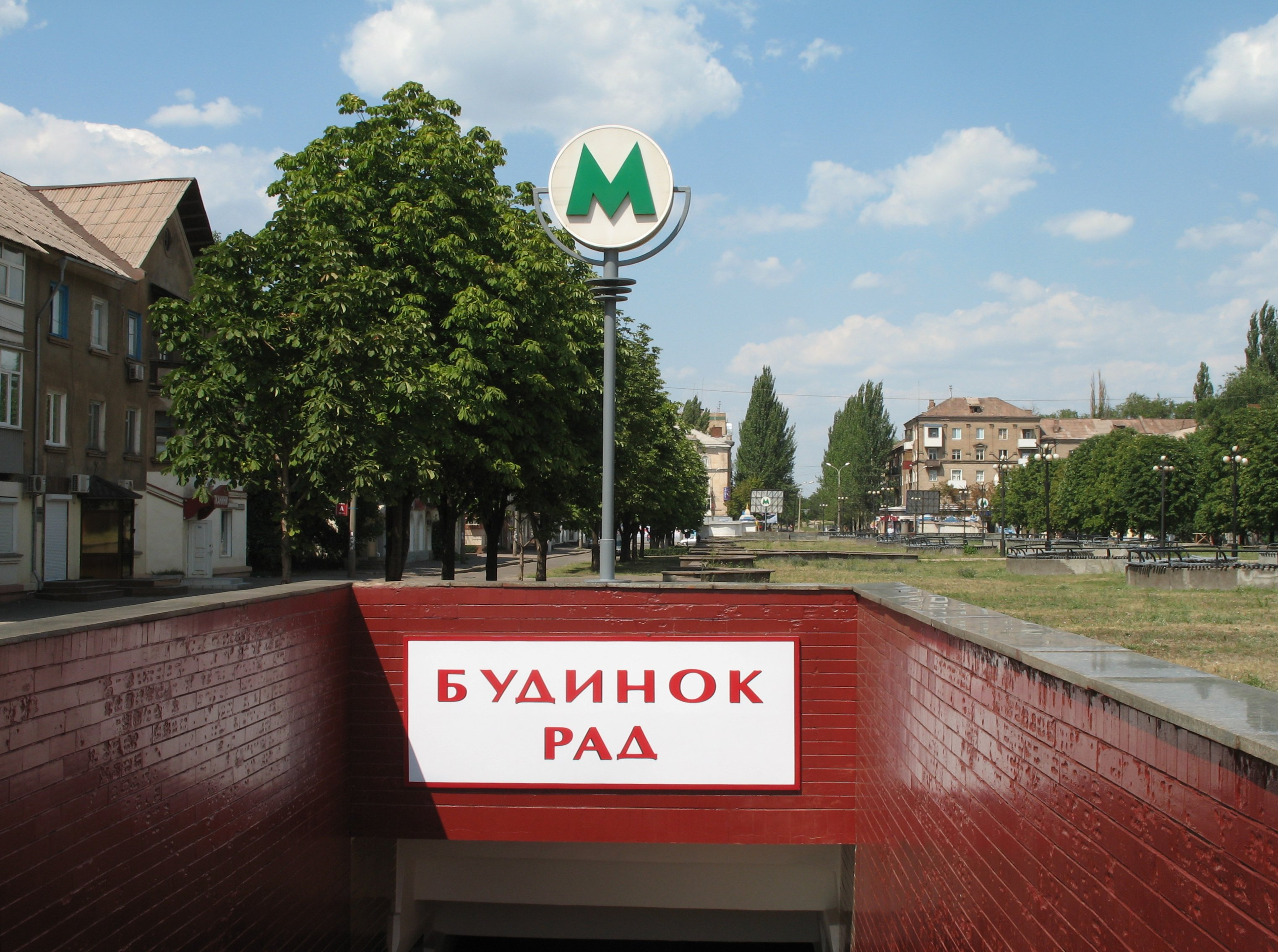
- Station entrance

General information
- Location: Metalurhiinyi District, Dzhokhara Dudaieva Str.
- Coordinates: 47.9086°N 33.3967°E
- System: Kryvyi Rih Metrotram
- Operator: Kryvyi Rih Metro

History
- Opened: 23 February 1988

Services
Preceding station	Kryvyi Rih Metrotram	Following station
Prospekt Metalurhiv towards Kiltseva	Route 1	Mudriona towards Maidan Pratsi
Prospekt Metalurhiv towards Kiltseva	Route 2	Mudriona towards Zarichna
Prospekt Metalurhiv towards Vulytsia Zbahachuvalna	Route 3	Mudriona towards Zarichna
Prospekt Metalurhiv towards PivdHZK	Route 4	Mudriona towards Zarichna
Location

Miska Rada (lit. 'City Council'; Ukrainian: Міська Рада) is an underground station on the Kryvyi Rih Metro. It opened on 23 February 1988 as part of the first segment of the second stage.

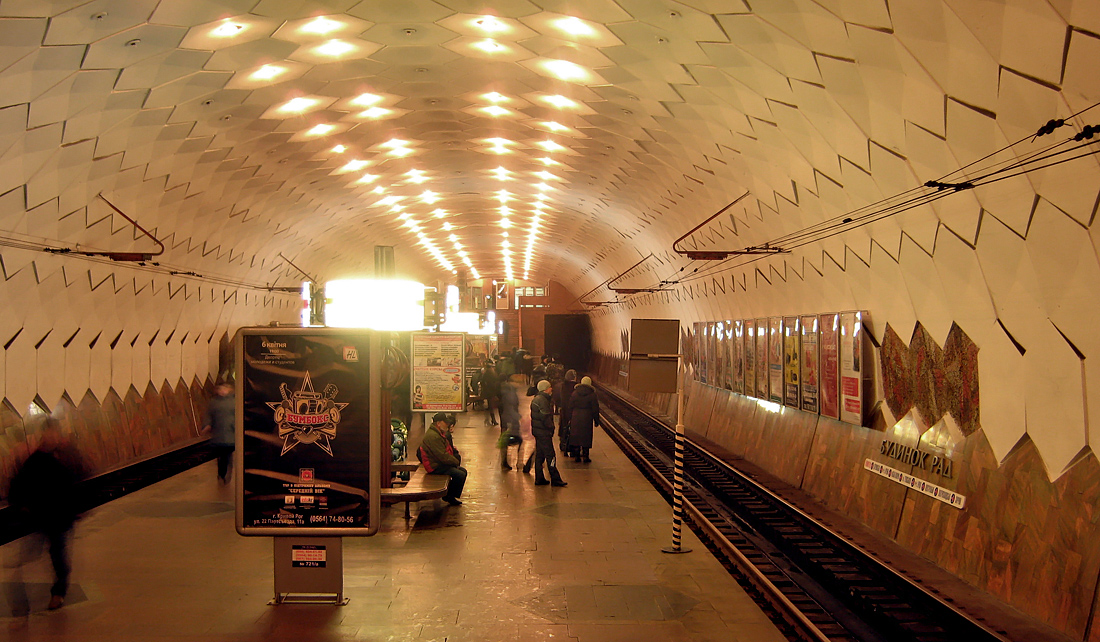
Station platform

The station sits right in the center of the city next to the city council building. When the station was opened, there were delays with the construction of two other stations, so to justify the system, a temporary shuttle service was organized with two three-car trams ferrying passengers between the city center and the reversal ring on the Mudryona station. On 2 May 1989, after the completion of the remaining two stations on the second stage, standard transit was possible and the shuttle service was discontinued.

The station also lacks an external vestibule; instead, two vestibules are located underground on both ends of the platform. One of the biggest problems that arose with the construction of a Metro-type station was that unidirectional trams, common in the Soviet Union, only have doors on the right side, meaning that the direction had to alternate prior to arriving at the station with an island platform (given the right-hand rail operation used in the USSR). As a result, the tracks cross before reaching the station and continue on the same side until Prospekt Metalurhiv where they cross back to the standard right-hand arrangement

The station is a typical single vault (Khariv design). The two stations are also most extravagant, which is another trademark of ex-Soviet Metro systems. Whereas other stations make use of the architecture of the surface structure and arrange the interior to be aesthetic, this station is exactly the opposite. Red marble is used for the walls and floor; the ceiling of the vault consists of a hexagonal honeycomb arrangement. Three mosaics with a Soviet theme are present on both walls. Lighting comes from a series of light bulbs installed in the center of each hexagon on the apexal rows of the vault. However, for financial reasons, it is rare that they are all turned on at once.

In 2024, the Budynok Rad (House of Soviets) station was renamed to Miska Rada, as a result of decommunization.
