= Metalurh Stadium (Kryvyi Rih) =

Stadium in Kryvyi Rih, Ukraine

Coordinates: 47°53′42″N 33°23′33″E

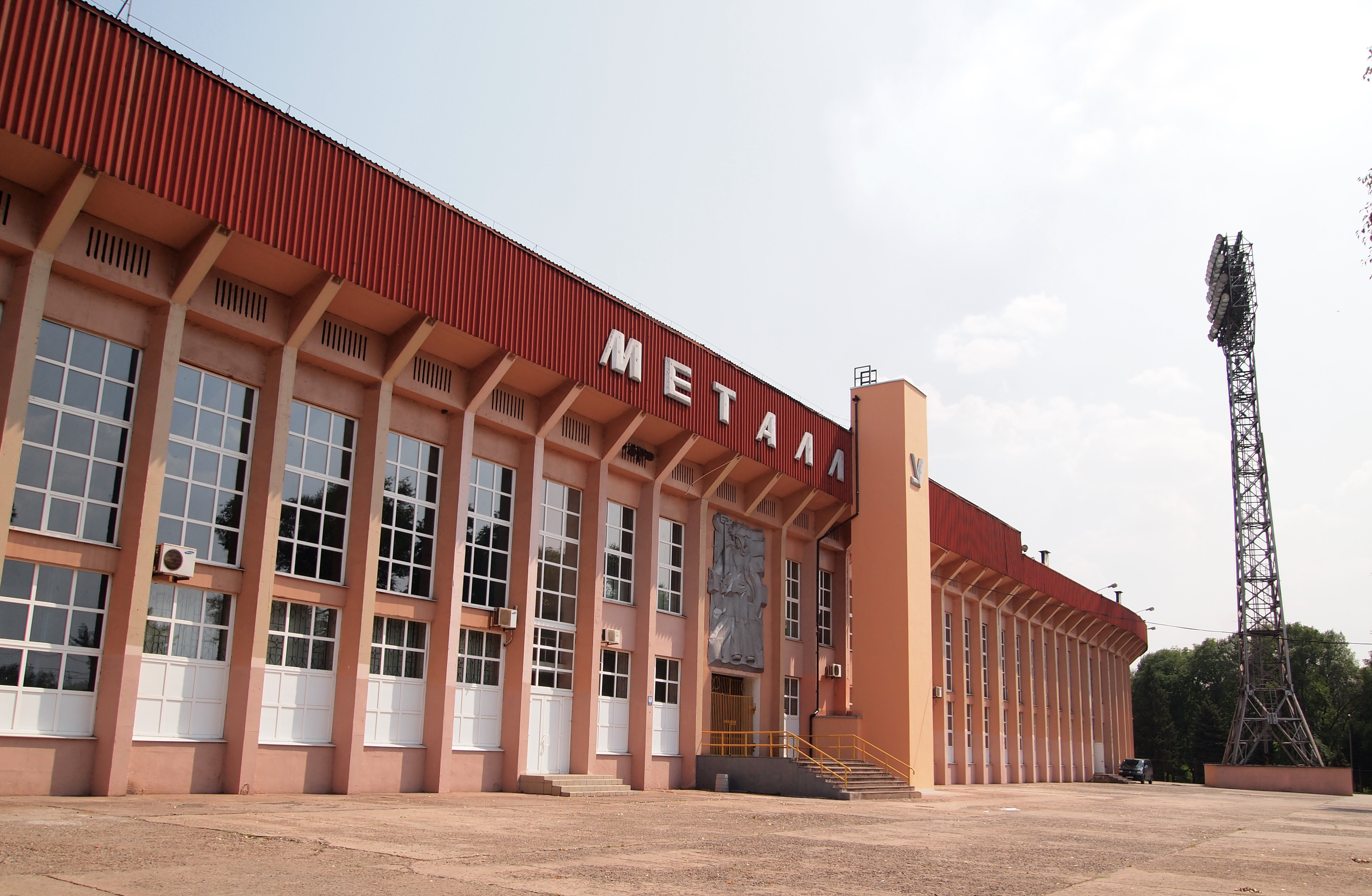
- Interactive map of Metalurh Stadium
- Location: Metallurgical District, Socic Town, Kryvyi Rih, Ukraine
- Capacity: 29,734 (football)
- Surface: Grass

Construction
- Opened: 1970
- Renovated: 1999, 2012—2021, 2021— current
- Demolished: 2021

Tenant
- FC Kryvbas Kryvyi Rih

Metalurh Stadium is a multi-purpose stadium in Kryvyi Rih, Ukraine, currently under reconstruction. It is located in Metallurgical District, in the neighborhood called lit. 'Socic Town' (Ukrainian: 'Sotsmisto').

It was used mostly for football matches as the home of FC Kryvbas Kryvyi Rih. The stadium had a capacity of 29,734. The subway station Prospekt Metalurhiv of the Kryvyi Rih Metro is located next to the stadium.

== History ==
The stadium was built in 1970. For the 225th city anniversary in 1999, the stadium was renovated and had individual seats installed. During the Soviet period until 1988, the stadium was used by FC Dnipro to play in European competitions as the adjacent city of Dnipro (Dnipropetrovsk then) around 150 kilometers away was a closed city.

On 14 May 2006, Metalurh Stadium hosted the gold match between Shakhtar Donetsk and Dynamo Kyiv. The winning goal in extra time during the game was scored by Julius Aghahowa.

Since 2012, the stadium had required renovations and in 2012 had some money allocated for it from the city budget.

On 28 February 2018, the city council decided to reconstruct the stadium. In August 2020, the President of Ukraine instructed that the stadium Kryvyi Rih should host the 2022 Ukrainian Cup Final. On 27 August 2020 it was announced that reconstruction cost for the stadium may be increased to ₴600 million in order to prepare the stadium for the cup final. When finished, the stadium's capacity would decrease to 16,750.

The rebuilding of the stadium to bring it up to FIFA and UEFA standards began in January 2021, and by 5 February 2021, the stadium had been completely demolished for reconstruction. FC Kryvbas played their matches at various stadiums and the Hirnyk Stadium while it is under reconstruction. The stadium was originally scheduled to be completed in 2022, but due to the war with Russia, construction of the stadium has been suspended.

== Gallery ==
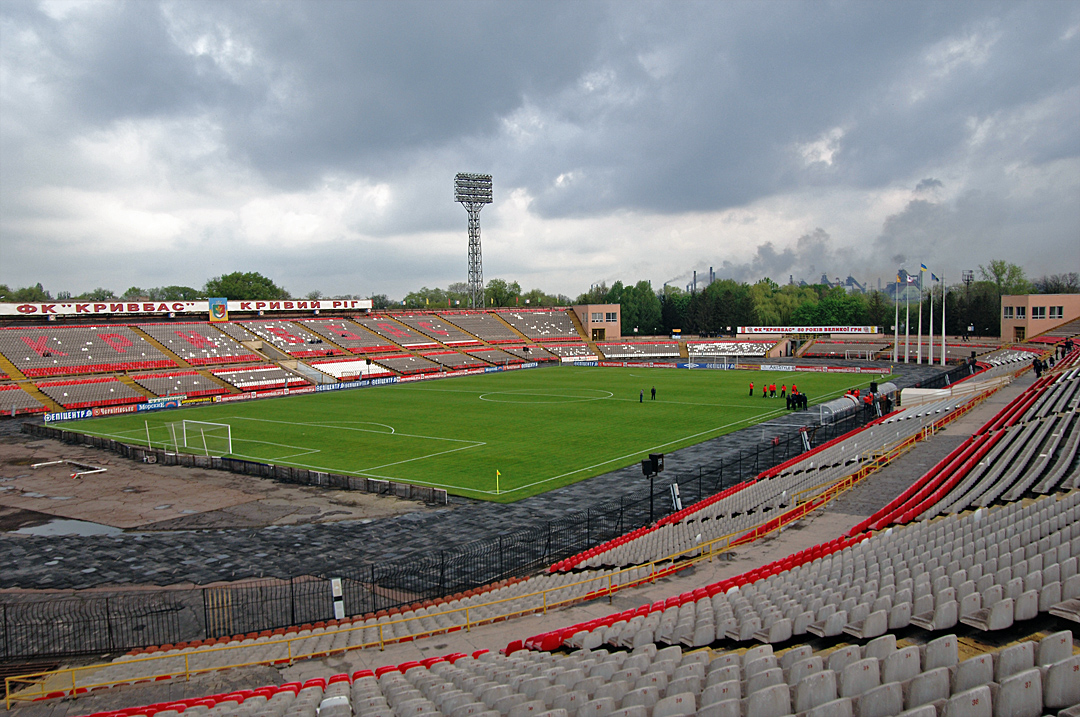
Field view

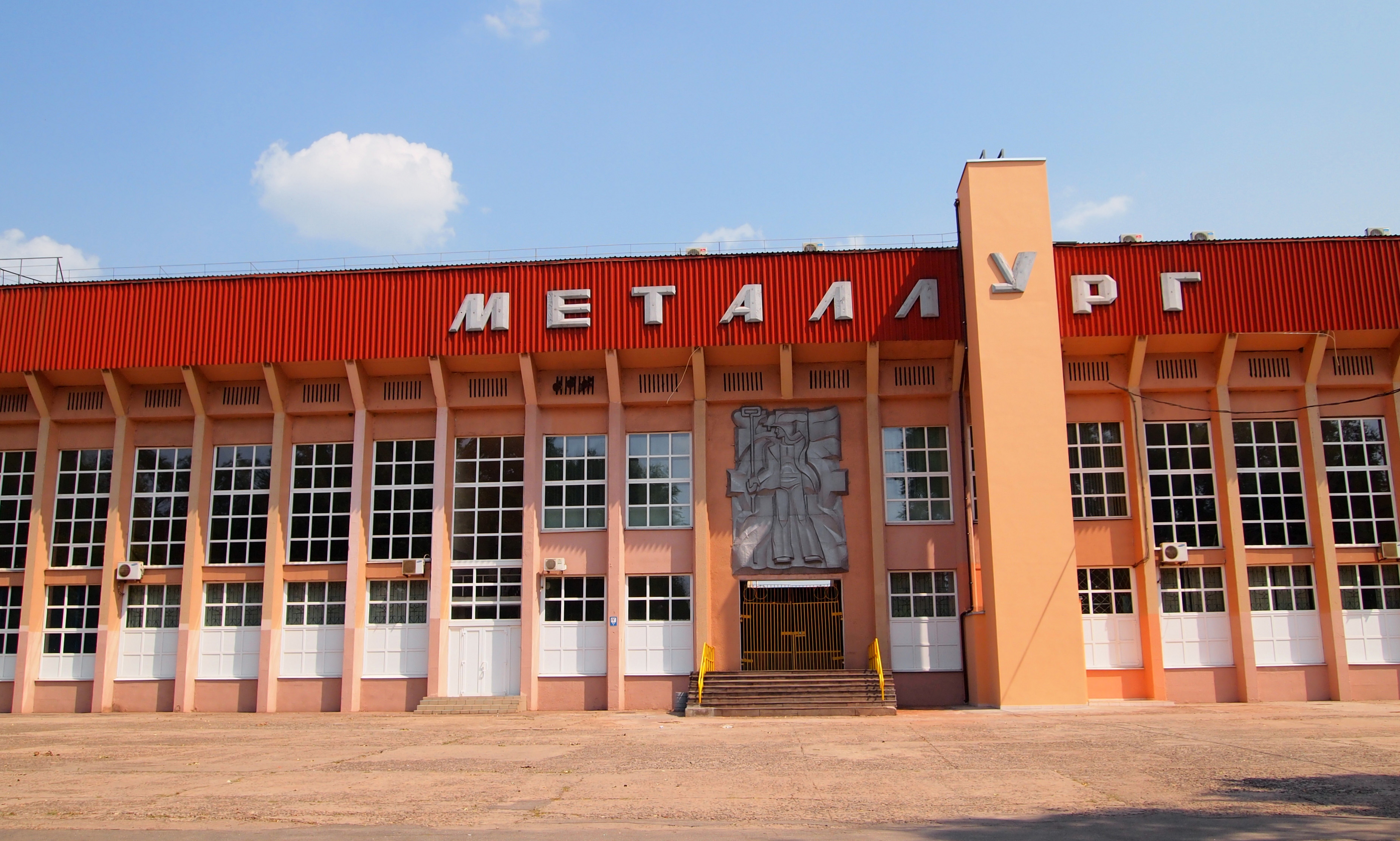
Front entrance
