= Kiltse KMK =

Kryvyi Rih Metrotram station

General information
- Coordinates: 47.8849°N 33.3935°E
- System: Kryvyi Rih Metrotram
- Owner: Kryvyi Rih Metrotram

History
- Rebuilt: 25 May 2012

Services
Preceding station	Kryvyi Rih Metrotram	Following station
Terminus	Route 3	Tretia Dilnytsia towards Zarichna
Location

Kiltse KMK (Ukrainian: Кiльце КМК; Russian: Кольцо КМК, "Loop of Kryvyi Rih Mettalurgical Combinate") is a station of the Kryvyi Rih Metrotram and tram systems. The station is originally part of the city's larger tram system, although it was incorporated into the Metrotram route 3М (and 4М later) along with four other stations on 25 May 2012.

The Kiltse KMK station is located above ground, with platforms running on either side of the tram's tracks. A reversing loop is located directly behind the station to allow trams to change course and travel in the opposite direction.
