= Prospekt Metalurhiv (Kryvyi Rih Metrotram) =

Kryvyi Rih Metrotram station

Prospect Metalurhiv
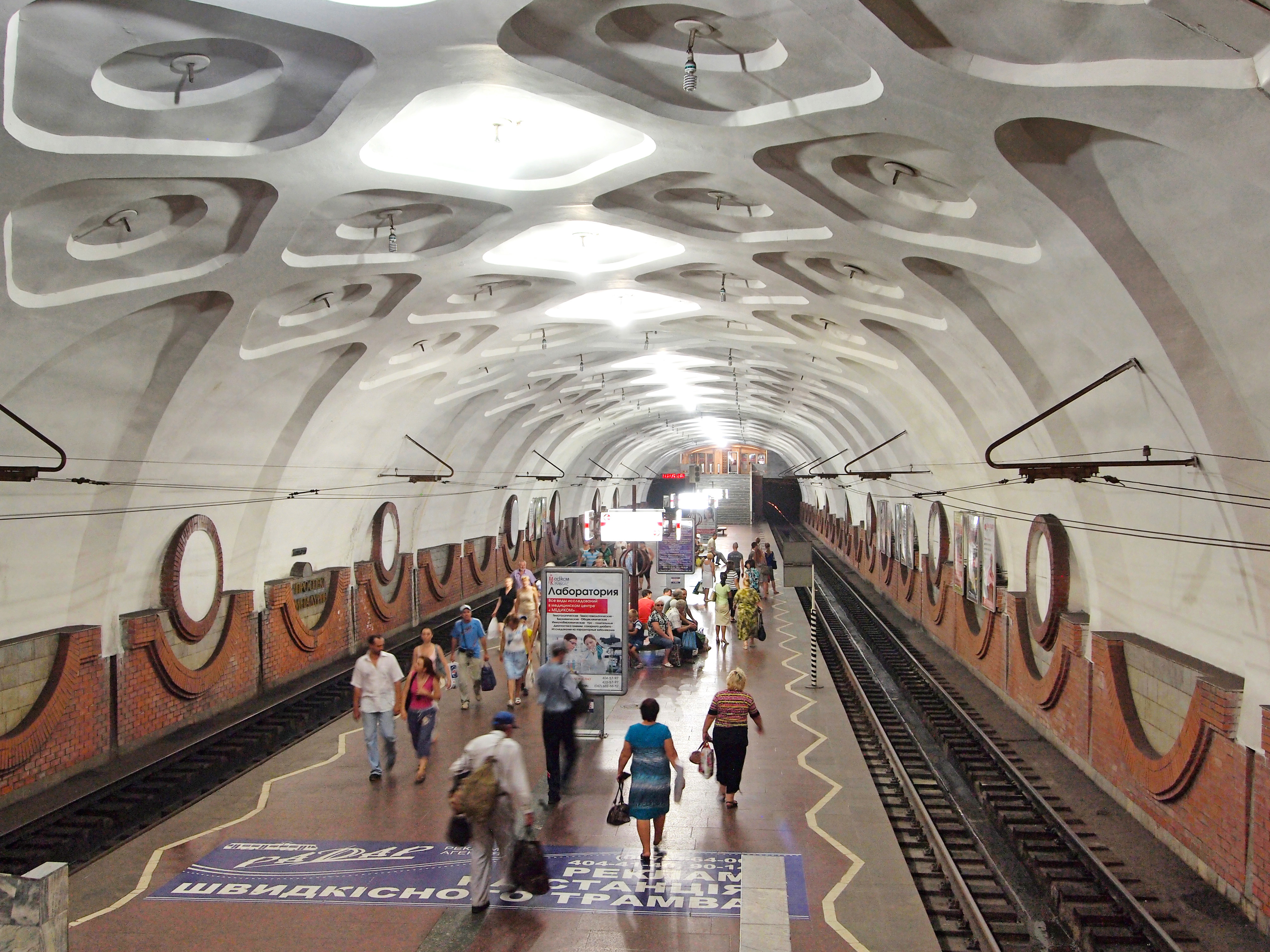
- Prospect Metalurhiv

General information
- Location: Metallurgical District, Socic Town, Metallurgists Avenue; Kryvyi Rih, Ukraine
- Coordinates: 47.8976°N 33.3935°E
- System: Kryvyi Rih Metrotram
- Owner: Kryvyi Rih City Council
- Operator: Kryvyi Rih Metro

History
- Opened: 2 May 1989

Services
Preceding station	Kryvyi Rih Metrotram	Following station
Kiltseva Terminus	Route 1	Miska Rada towards Maidan Pratsi
Kiltseva Terminus	Route 2	Miska Rada towards Zarichna
KNEU towards Vulytsia Zbahachuvalna	Route 3	Miska Rada towards Zarichna
KNEU towards PivdHZK	Route 4	Miska Rada towards Zarichna
Location

Prospect Metalurhiv (lit. 'Metallurgists Avenue', Ukrainian: Проспект Металургiв) is a station on the Kryvyi Rih Metro. Opened on 2 May 1989 as part of the second segment of the second stage.

The construction is the same standard as the Kharkiv Metro single vault layout, with a provision for the platform to be raised. Decoratively, a large monolithic concrete vault with a series of niches with suspended luminescent chandeliers. Red brickwork and gray marble is used on walls whilst red and gray granite cover the floor.

The system reaches its deepest point, 22 meters between the two stations, Prospect Metalurhiv and Budynok Rad.

The station is situated on the intersection between the Metalurgists Avenue (Prospect Metalurhiv) and Unity (Sobornosti) Street near the Metalurh Stadium, home ground to FC Kryvbas Kryvyi Rih. The station has two underground vestibules, interconnected with subways.
