= Vechirnii Bulvar (Kryvyi Rih Metrotram) =

Kryvyi Rih Metrotram station

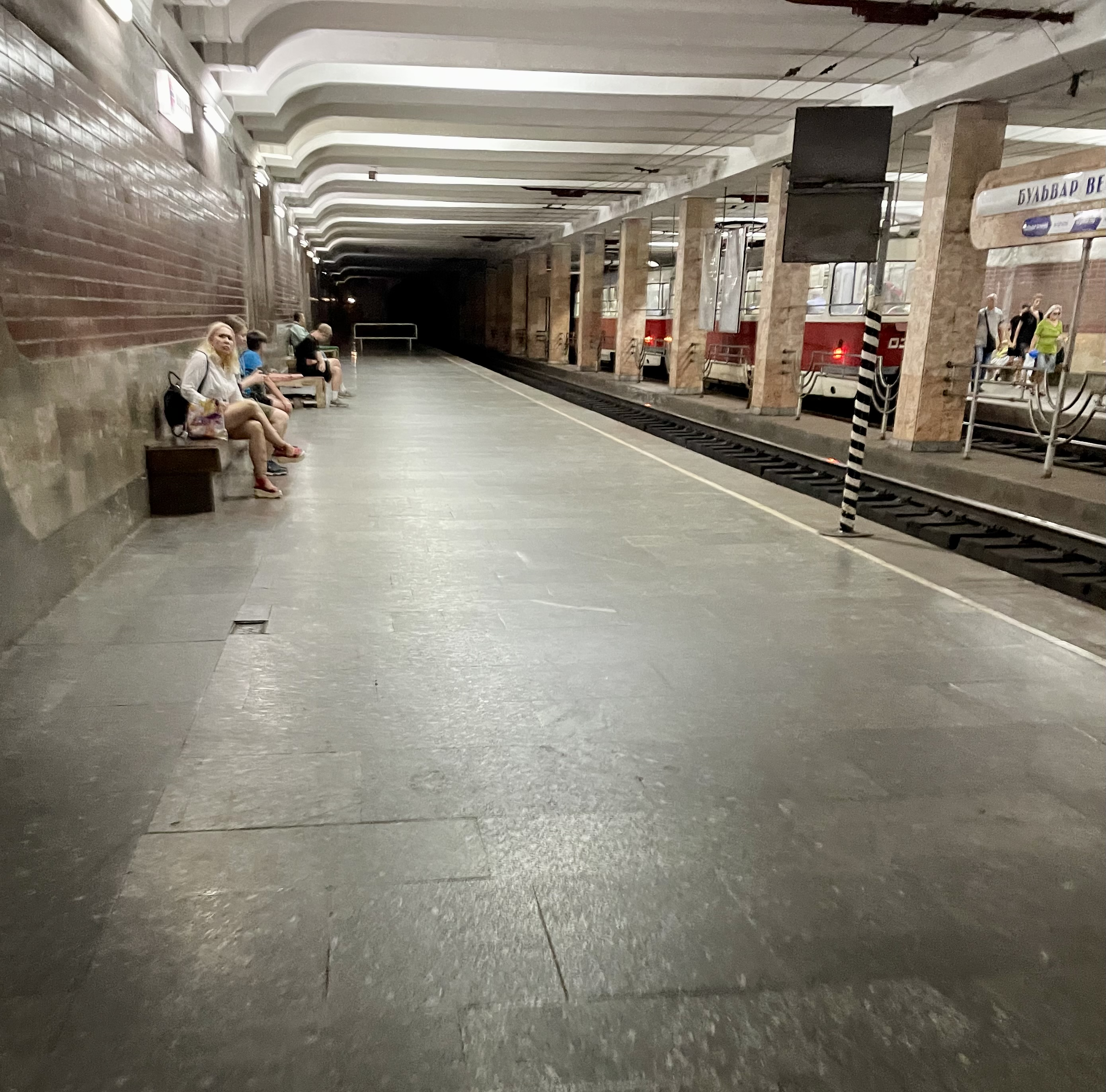

General information
- Coordinates: 47.9370°N 33.4211°E
- System: Kryvyi Rih Metrotram
- Operator: Kryvyi Rih Metrotram

History
- Opened: 26 December 1986

Services
| Preceding station | Kryvyi Rih Metrotram | Following station |
|---|---|---|
| Mudriona towards Kiltseva | Route 1 | Miska Likarnia towards Maidan Pratsi |
| Mudriona towards Kiltseva | Route 2 | Miska Likarnia towards Zarichna |
| Mudriona towards Vulytsia Zbahachuvalna | Route 3 | Miska Likarnia towards Zarichna |
| Mudriona towards PivdHZK | Route 4 | Miska Likarnia towards Zarichna |
Location

Vechirnii Bulvar (lit. 'Evening Boulevard', Ukrainian: Вечірній бульвар) is a station on the Kryvyi Rih Metrotram. Opened as part of the first stage on 26 December 1986, it was the first proper Metro-type underground station in the system. Located in the middle of a tunnel stretch that is of 2.3 kilometers in length which was built to avoid physically dividing the Microdistrict 6 by the Metro tracks, as the original 1970s designs called for.

The station is a shallow level design with two side platforms and a row of pillars in between. Decoratively, the pillars are faced with pink marble, whilst the top of the walls are faced with dark red ceramic tiles, and the bottom with beige marble. The floor is laid with gray granite.

The station's single vestibule - rotunda, is located on the intersection between the Bulvarnyi lane, Pavla Hlazovoho and Cosmonauts streets. Until 2016 the station was named Artema Square after an eponymous city square (today called Vladimir the Great Square), actually located a fair distance away from the station, which held a massive statue of the "Bolshevik" Fyodor Sergeyev (nicknamed Artem), the chairman of the Commissariat of the Donetsk Krivoy Rog Soviet Republic.
