= Mudriona (Kryvyi Rih Metrotram) =

Kryvyi Rih Metrotram station

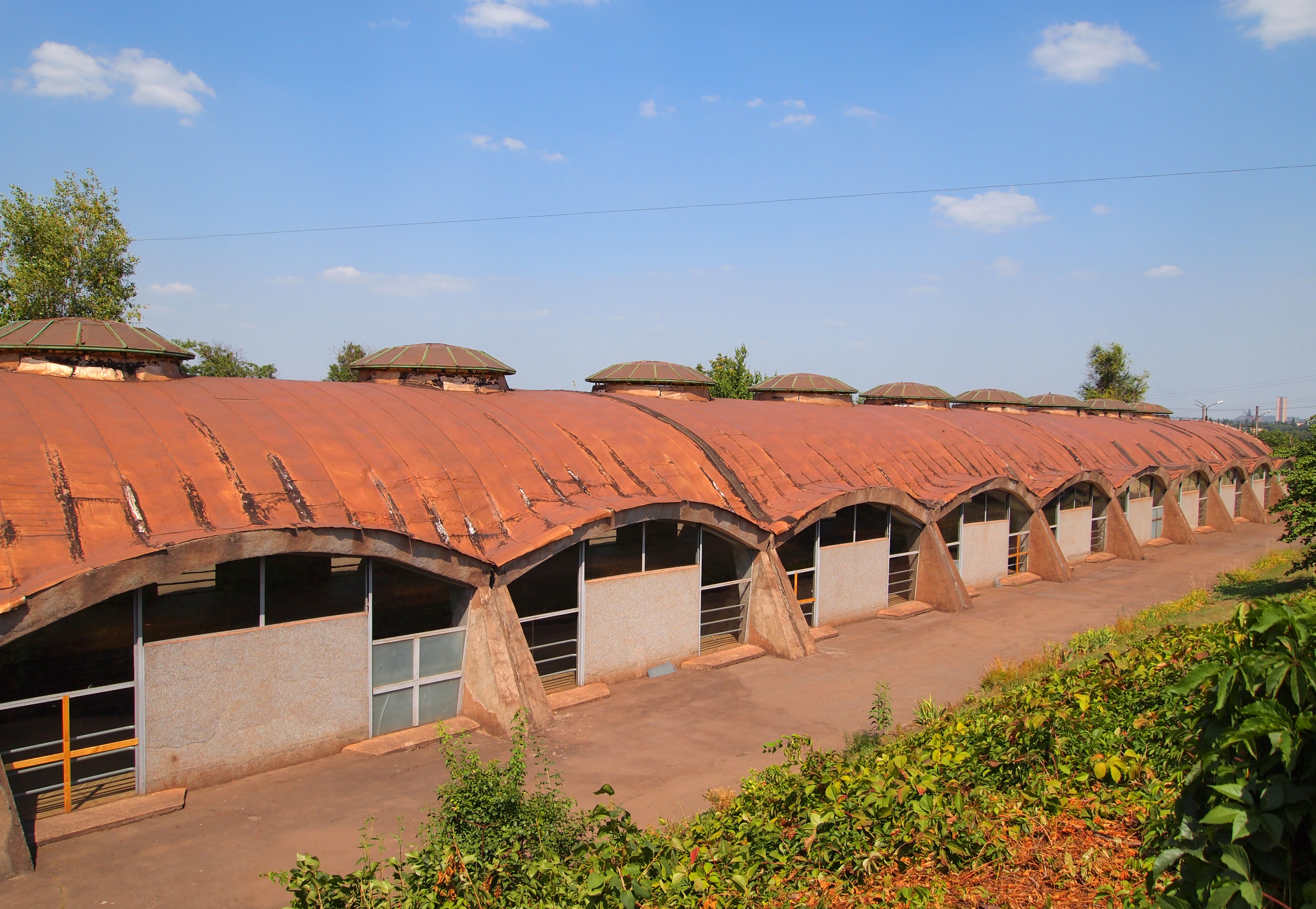
- Mudriona

General information
- Coordinates: 47.9184°N 33.4001°E
- System: Kryvyi Rih Metrotram
- Operator: Kryvyi Rih Metro

History
- Opened: 26 December 1986

Services
Preceding station	Kryvyi Rih Metrotram	Following station
Miska Rada towards Kiltseva	Route 1	Vechirnii Bulvar towards Maidan Pratsi
Miska Rada towards Kiltseva	Route 2	Vechirnii Bulvar towards Zarichna
Miska Rada towards Vulytsia Zbahachuvalna	Route 3	Vechirnii Bulvar towards Zarichna
Miska Rada towards PivdHZK	Route 4	Vechirnii Bulvar towards Zarichna
Location

Mudriona (lit. 'Tricky', Ukrainian: Мудрьона) is a station of the Kryvyi Rih Metro in the city of Kryvyi Rih in Ukraine. Serves all routes: 1М 2М 3М 4М

== History ==
The station was opened on 26 December 1986 as a reversing loop at the end of the first 8 km long segment of the metrotram. The present structure was opened in 1988, however as the second stage, due to technical problems, could not open at once, two three-car shuttles were in use on each track between the ring and Budynok Rad station. In 1989, after the opening of the second stage and the ring at Kiltseva, the shuttle service was discontinued, and the use of the ring with its platform at this station was discontinued, although both were retained for emergency use.

=== Renaming ===
Originally named "Dzerzhynska" (after the communist revolutionary Felix Dzerzhinsky), the station was renamed in April 2016 due to decommunization in Ukraine.

== Description ==
Nearby is a railroad station Mudriona, which only serves suburban trains.

The construction of the station is just as unique as its location, it is located on the portal of the prolonged tunnel that passes under the city center, as a result its rotunda vestibule is located on the upper level (on top of the portal) and passengers have to descend onto the platforms, which are also located on ground level. The station presents a long stretched concrete vault with a row of supports and two side platforms. There is a series of glazed crowns that provide natural lighting at daytime and additional natural lighting comes from the glazed openings at the base of the vault between the supports.

== Interesting facts ==
The station is located in a rather exotic location:

- The closest street opened to regular traffic is about 15-minute walk through a private housing sector.
- Because of this the station has the lowest passenger traffic in the system.
- Moreover, a tourist attraction called Red Lake is 200 meters away. The whole year the lake retains its rich red-pink color. This is a large technogenic tailings dam of mine waters pumped out of the ground from a depth of more than 1 km. The water of the lake contains a large amount of bromine, iodine, sodium, potassium and magnesium. Though, the lake can be barely seen from the dam because of the hill barriers. Sometimes the lake gets extremely dried out.
- The metro line is laid through the dam separating Red Lake from the Saksahan reservoir. It was built on the Saksahan river to meet the needs of nearby mining enterprises. During the warm season the latter sometimes served as a popular location for extreme water sports (particularly wakeboarding).
