= Miska Likarnia (Kryvyi Rih Metrotram) =

Kryvyi Rih Metrotram station

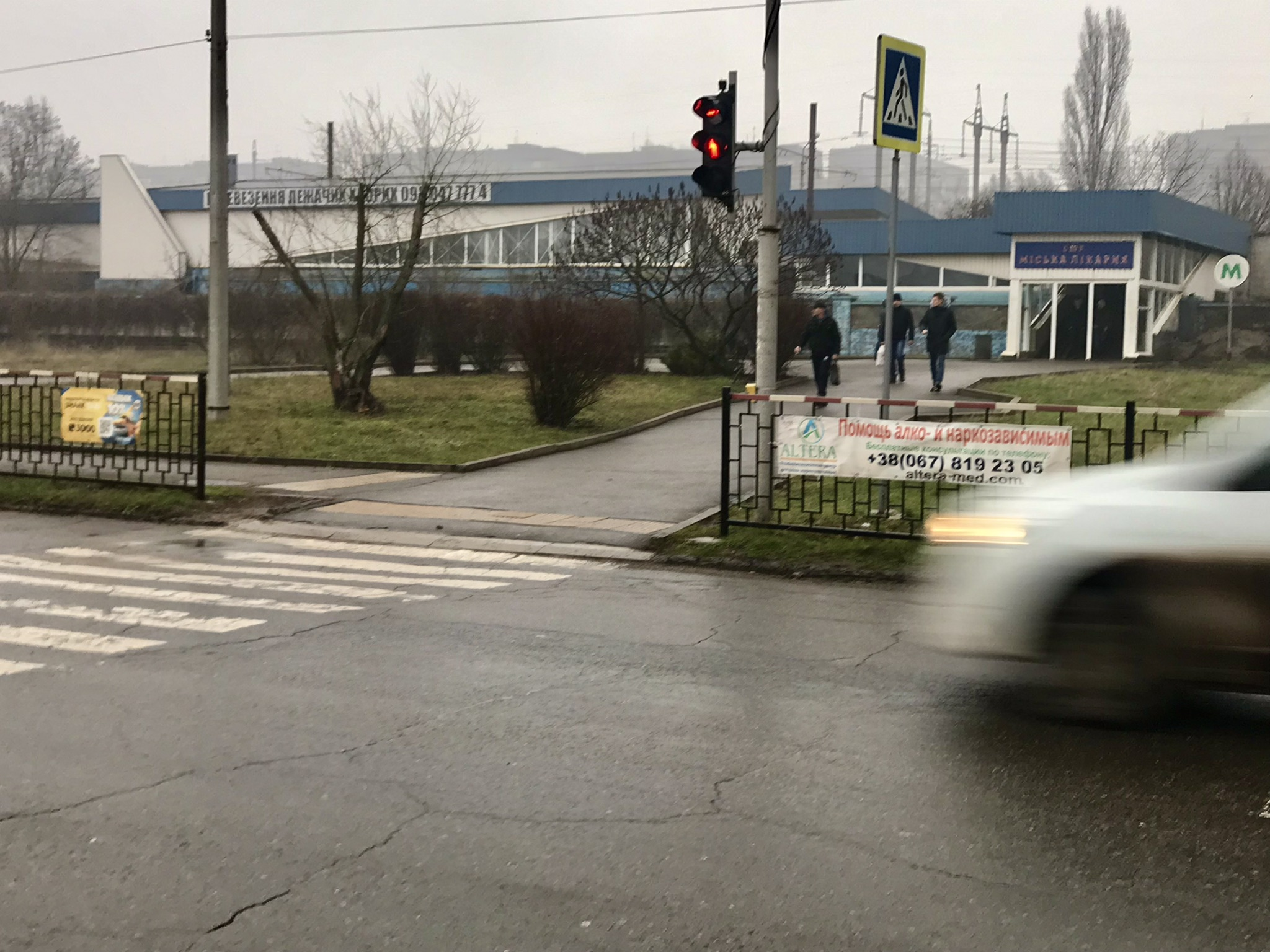

General information
- Coordinates: 47.9505°N 33.4492°E
- System: Kryvyi Rih Metrotram
- Operator: Kryvyi Rih Metro

History
- Opened: 19 May 2001

Services
Preceding station	Kryvyi Rih Metrotram	Following station
Vechirnii Bulvar towards Kiltseva	Route 1	Soniachna towards Maidan Pratsi
Vechirnii Bulvar towards Kiltseva	Route 2	Soniachna towards Zarichna
Vechirnii Bulvar towards Vulytsia Zbahachuvalna	Route 3	Soniachna towards Zarichna
Vechirnii Bulvar towards PivdHZK	Route 4	Soniachna towards Zarichna
Location

Miska Likarnia (lit. 'City Hospital', Ukrainian: Мiська Лiкарня) is a station on the Kryvyi Rih Metrotram. Opened on 19 May 2001, it is currently the newest one in the system. The station was built into an existing track between the stations of Sonyachna and Vechirniy bulvar in the interests of serving the microraions of Skhidnyi and Sonyachnyi, which lacked stations nearby. It is named after the central municipal hospital, which is located 500 meters from the station.

The station demonstrates another of the system's massive advantage over a traditional Metro system, the ease at which a station can be built into an existing track. In the original plans there was no provision for the station, however, the tracks in the area are very straight and there are a number of subways that were built back in 1980s under the tram lines. It was decided the subway would be converted, and the station would be built around it, with two side platforms. As there was no perfect symmetry between the portals of the subway and its distance to the future platforms, the tracks had to be slightly moved eastwards to make room for the western platform.

In addition, the subway was "extended" through glazed pavilions to make room for platform leading staircases and turnstiles. In the interests of cost-saving, the platforms were made shorter and narrower than the standard sizes of other stations. Also the metal canopy which hinges over does not extend far enough to actually provide adequate protection from the weather elements. The overall effect made the appearance resemble more of a terminal bus stop than that of a Metrotram station.

== See also ==
- Druha Miska Likarnia (Kryvyi Rih Metrotram)
