= Soniachna (Kryvyi Rih Metrotram) =

Kryvyi Rih Metro station

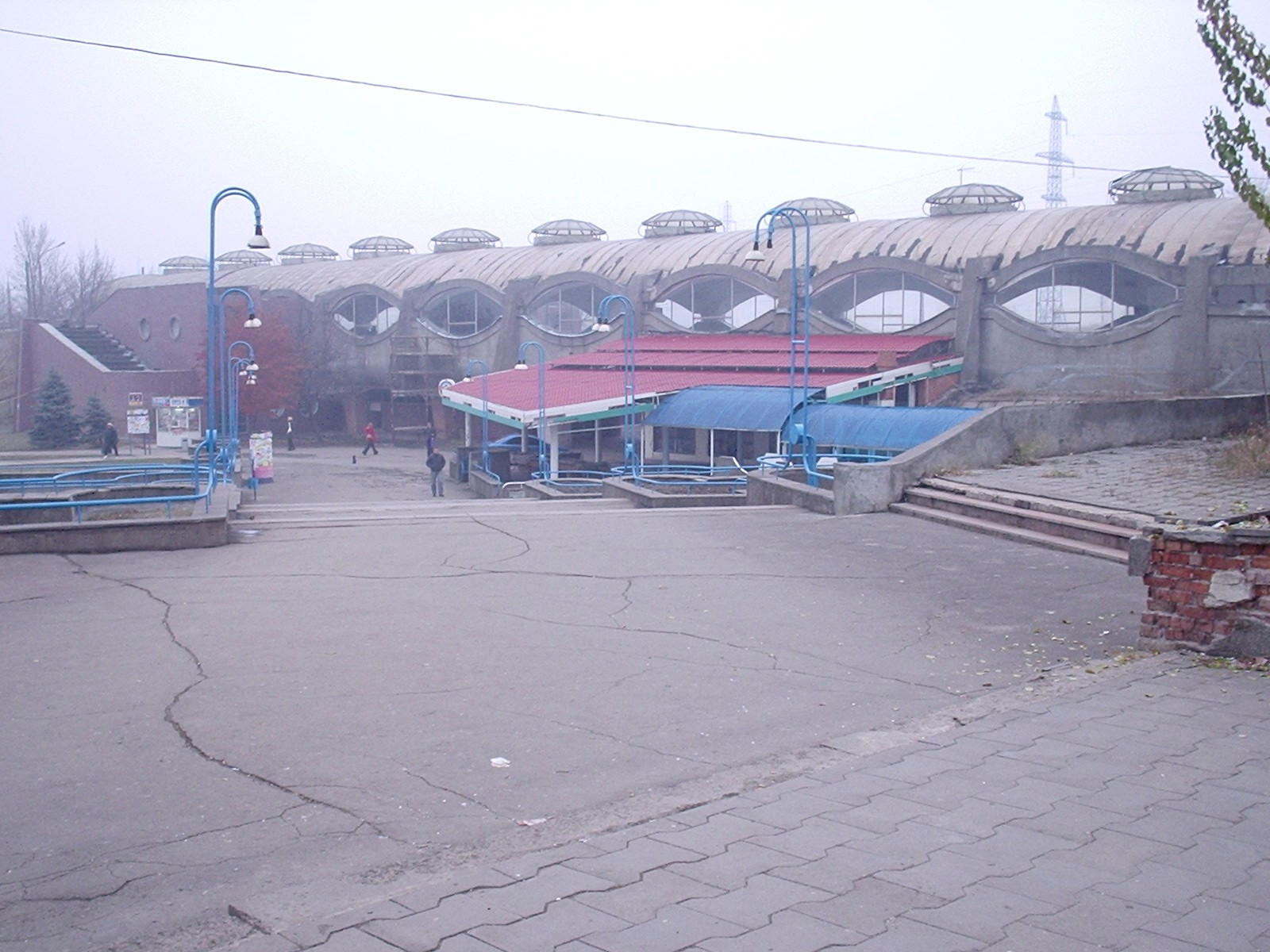
- Soniachna

General information
- Coordinates: 47°57′24″N 33°27′23″E
- System: Kryvyi Rih Metrotram
- Operator: Kryvyi Rih Metro

History
- Opened: 26 December 1986

Services
Preceding station	Kryvyi Rih Metrotram	Following station
Miska Likarnia towards Kiltseva	Route 1	Maidan Pratsi Terminus
Miska Likarnia towards Kiltseva	Route 2	Industrialna towards Zarichna
Miska Likarnia towards Vulytsia Zbahachuvalna	Route 3	Industrialna towards Zarichna
Miska Likarnia towards PivdHZK	Route 4	Industrialna towards Zarichna
Location

Soniachna (lit. 'Sunny', Ukrainian: Сонячна) is a station on the Kryvyi Rih Metro. It opened on 26 December 1986 as part of the first stage of the system.

Geographically Soniachna is located on a junction of four microraions of the city (Soniachnyi, after which the station is named, Skhidnyi-1,2,3 and Hirnytskyi). It is the last station on the combined track before the metrotram's route splits to the two branches; this makes it the busiest station on the system.

Originally the station was named Zhovtneva (Ukrainian: Жовтнева, Russian: Oktyabr'skaya) after the nearby market (Zhovtnevyi rynok). However, in early 2007, the station was renamed in honour of Hryhoryi Hutovskyi (Ukrainian: ім. Григорія Гутовського), for the soviet era official and engineer who effectively ensured that the system would be completed. This station in particular was special, as he was handled all the executive work that was associated with its construction. In 2016, the station was finally renamed to Soniachna.

Architecturally, the station presents a large two-story structure with the metro rails passing on the upper level, and the vestibule as well as technical compartments located on the lower level. The upper part consists of a concrete cupola-type vault that rests on two rows of supports. Marble is used for the lower side of the support on the interior and gray granite on the platforms. On the apex of each "cupola" is a glazed crown which provides natural lighting during daytime.

Between the supports are large, glazed openings, leading to an uncommon nickname podlodka (submarine), after the craft that it resembles. As the station has a side-platform arrangement, there are also additional staircases for departure from the platform level on both sides and a walkway space underneath the station.
