= Kryvyi Rih main station =

Railway station in Kryvyi Rih, Ukraine

Kryvyi Rih–Main Кривий Ріг–Головний
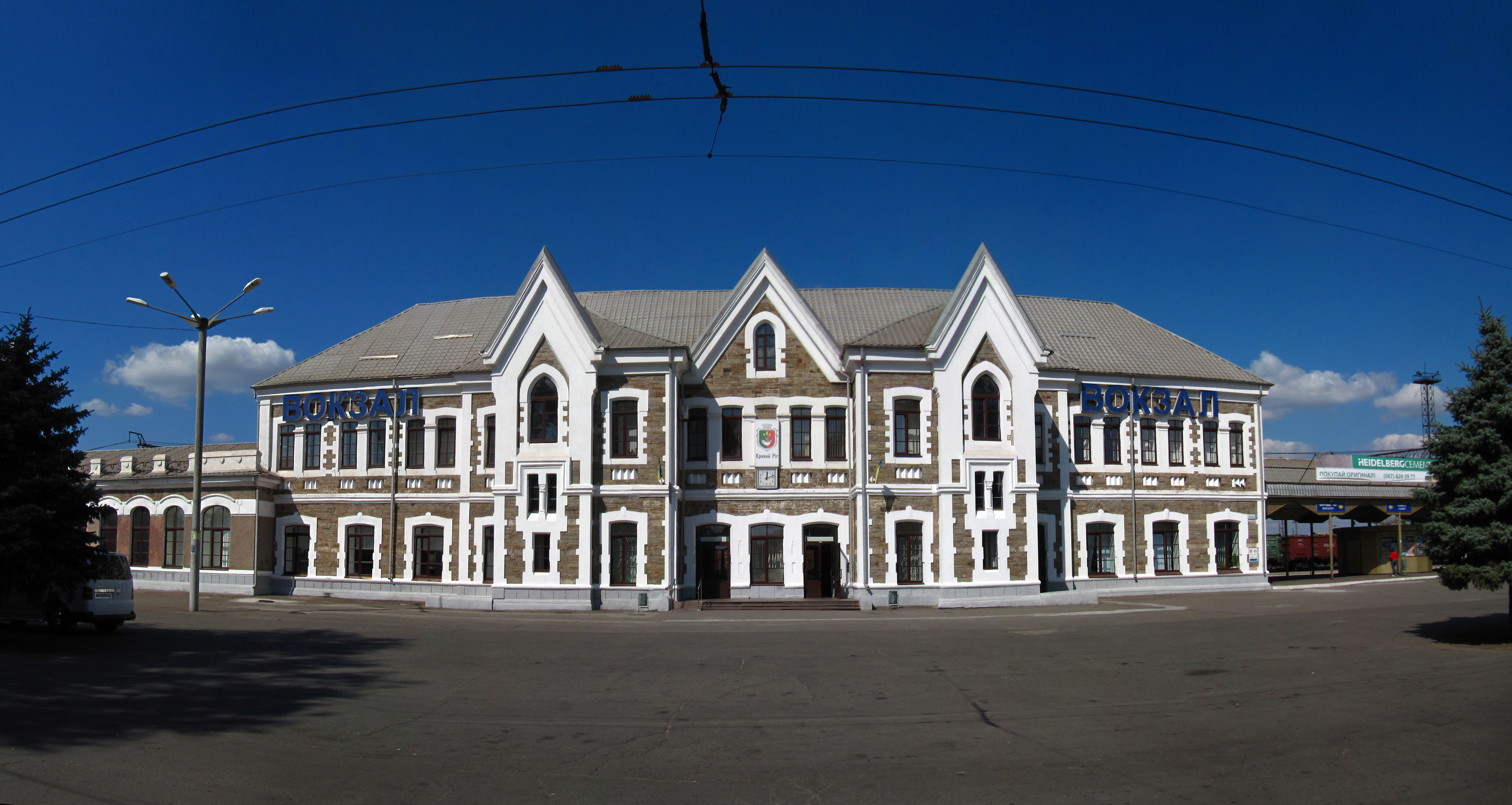
- View outside

General information
- Location: 1 Zaliznychnykiv Street, Kryvyi Rih, Ukraine
- Coordinates: 47.9123°N 33.4516°E
- Platforms: 3
- Tracks: 3
- Connections: Tram, trolleybus, city minibus lines

Construction
- Parking: Yes
- Cycle facilities: No
- Accessible: No

History
- Opened: 1884
- Rebuilt: 1912, 1990

Services
Preceding station	Ukrainian Railways	Following station
Terminus	Verkhivtseve–Kryvyi Rih	93 km toward Verkhivtseve
Terminus	Kryvyi Rih–Apostolove	Kryvyi Rih toward Apostolovo
Terminus	Kryvyi Rih–Pyatykhatky	Mudr'ona toward Pyatykhatky
Novoblochna toward Dolynska	Kryvyi Rih–Dolynska	Terminus
Location

Kryvyi Rih–Main (Ukrainian: Кривий Ріг–Головний, romanized: Kryvyi Rih–Holovnyi) is a railway station in Ukraine, the main passenger station of the Cisdnieper Railways. It is located in Kryvyi Rih, the seventh most populous city of Ukraine.
