= Druha Miska Likarnia (Kryvyi Rih Metrotram) =

Kryvyi Rih Metrotram station

City Hospital #2

General information
- Coordinates: 47.8844943°N 33.3892581°E
- System: Kryvyi Rih Metrotram

History
- Rebuilt: 25 May 2012

Services
Preceding station	Kryvyi Rih Metrotram	Following station
Stantsiia Kryvyi Rih towards Vulytsia Zbahachuvalna	Route 3	KNEU towards Zarichna
Stantsiia Kryvyi Rih towards PivdHZK	Route 4	KNEU towards Zarichna
Location

Druha Miska Likarnia (lit. 'City Hospital #2', Ukrainian: Друга мiська лiкарня) is a tram stop of the Kryvyi Rih Metrotram. This stop is originally part of the city's larger tram system, although it was incorporated into two metrotram's routes along with some other tram stops in the southern city districts. It is a stop on the metrotram's routes 3М and 4М, running both from Zarichna and to Zbahachuvalna str. and PivdHZK respectively.

== See also ==
- Miska Likarnia (Kryvyi Rih Metrotram)
