= Industrialna (Kryvyi Rih Metrotram) =

Kryvyi Rih Metrotram station

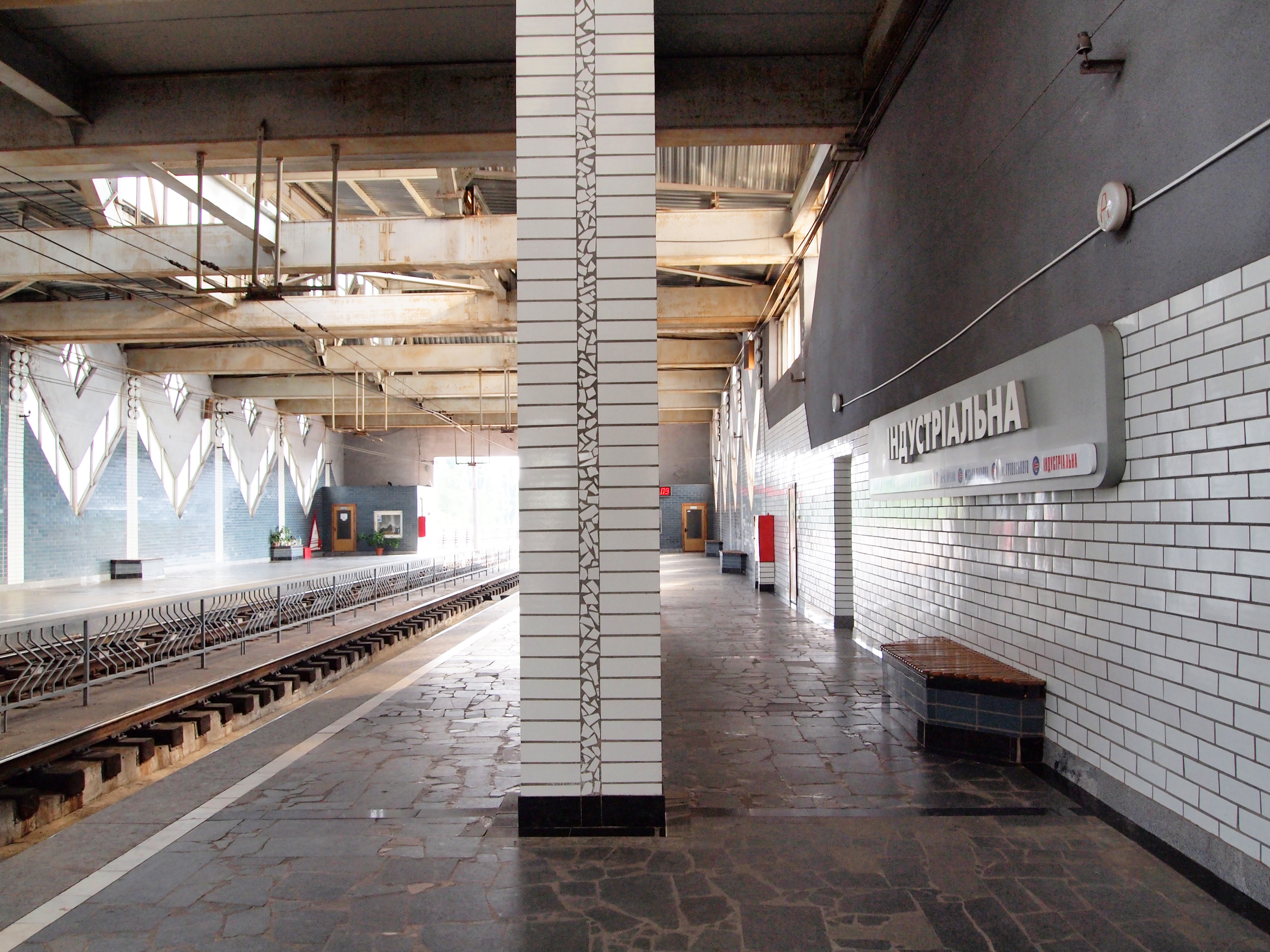
- Industrialna

General information
- Coordinates: 47°58′11″N 33°28′20″E
- System: Kryvyi Rih Metrotram
- Owner: Kryvyi Rih Metrotram

History
- Opened: 25 October 1999

Services
Preceding station	Kryvyi Rih Metrotram	Following station
Soniachna towards Kiltseva	Route 2	Elektrozavodska towards Zarichna
Soniachna towards Vulytsia Zbahachuvalna	Route 3	Elektrozavodska towards Zarichna
Soniachna towards PivdHZK	Route 4	Elektrozavodska towards Zarichna
Location

Insdustrialna (Ukrainian: Iндустрiальна; Russian: Индустриальная, romanized: Industrialnaya) is a station on the Kryvyi Rih Metrotram. It was opened on 25 October 1999 as the starting station on the third stage of the system.

Industrialna is located on the edge of the Industrialny raion of the city. Externally, the station is located on ground level, with side platforms encased in a large structure of 10 meters high with an additional 24-meter cantilevered "vestibule", where additional pillars are used to support it. The exits and entrances are done through a tunnel under the station with exits to the raion and on the eastern side to the Nikopol-Zhovti Vody road. Nearby is also the Kryvyi Rih Central Mining equipment maintenance Plant (KVRZ), whose workers use the station (hence the name, Industrial).

Although the station was opened in 1999, shortage of finances left it in a very depressed state. Exteriorly, bits of the aluminium covering are missing; also, never installed were the glass encasing the pavilions on the staircases. The crude steel and concrete bars that hold the tram wires obstruct the full height of the structure.
