= Elektrozavodska (Kryvyi Rih Metrotram) =

Kryvyi Rih Metrotram station

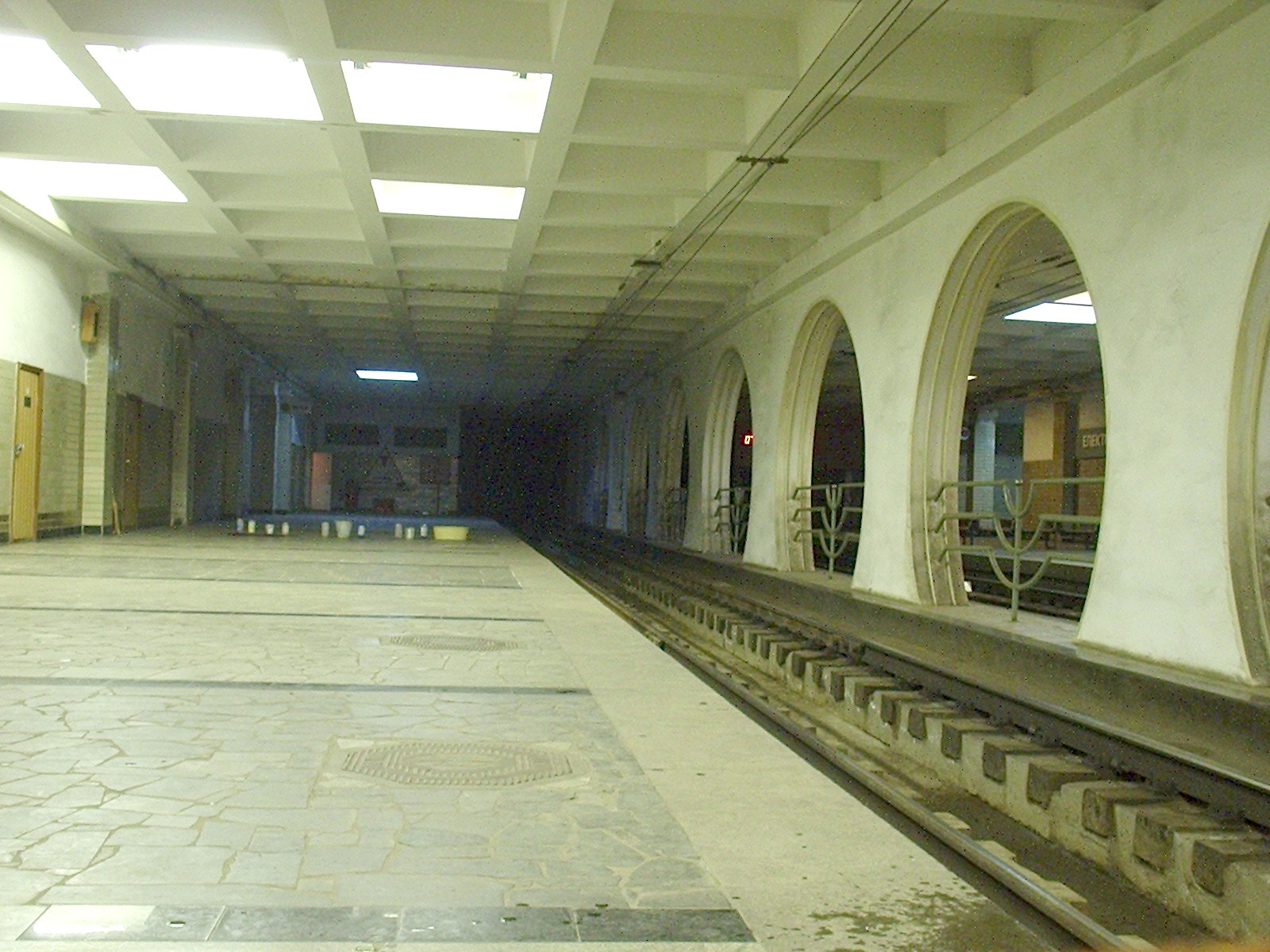
- Elektrozavodska

General information
- Coordinates: 47°59′43.08″N 33°29′32.28″E
- System: Kryvyi Rih Metrotram
- Owner: Kryvyi Rih Metrotram

History
- Opened: 27 May 2000

Services
Preceding station	Kryvyi Rih Metrotram	Following station
Industrialna towards Kiltseva	Route 2	Zarichna Terminus
Industrialna towards Vulytsia Zbahachuvalna	Route 3	Zarichna Terminus
Industrialna towards PivdHZK	Route 4	Zarichna Terminus
Location

Elektozavodska (Ukrainian: Електрозаводська; Russian: Элекрозаводская, Elektrozavodskaya) is a station of the Kryvyi Rih Metrotram.

In honour of the city's 225th anniversary on 27 May 2000, Elektrozavodska was opened on an existing track between Industrialna and Zarichna stations. The station is a subterranean, shallow level construction with two side platforms. A central wall with ten circular archways bisects the section, and supports the roofs. Grey colour tones are employed along with ceramic tiles arranged in a brickwork pattern on the walls. The dark shade make the station appear particularly gloomy and the darkest in the small system, as most of the lighting is switched off to conserve electricity (ironic as the station's name translates as electricity-factory).

From the middle of the station are two staircases leading to a large surface vestibule (the only underground station in Ukraine with such arrangement). Nevertheless, it does receive a lot of passenger traffic as a lot of bus and marshrutka routes terminate there.
