= Trolleybuses in Kryvyi Rih =

Transit system in Kryvyi Rih, Ukraine

Kryvyi Rih trolleybus system

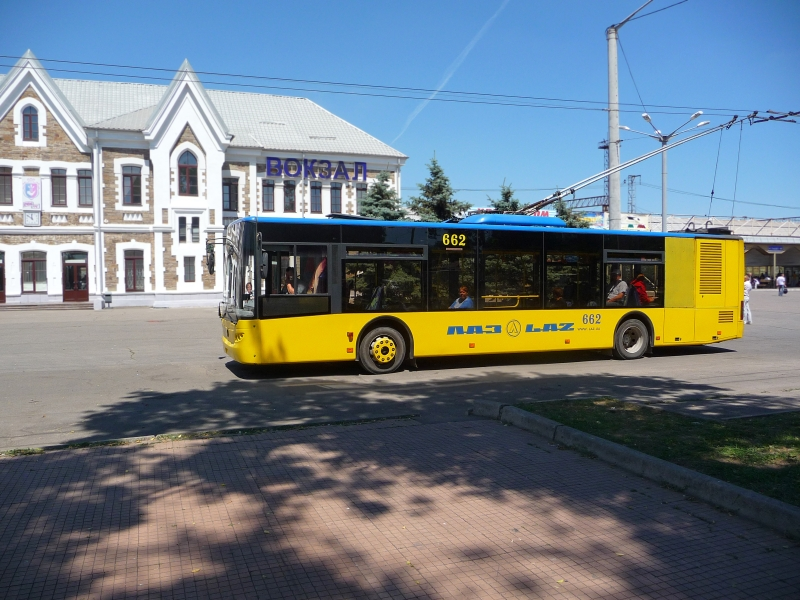
- Lviv Bus Factory ElectroLAZ 12

Operation
- Locale: Kryvyi Rih, Ukraine
- Open: 25 December 1957
- Operator: Kryvyi Rih City Council

Infrastructure
- Electrification: 600 V DC

Statistics
- Route length: 259.59 km

The Kryvyi Rih trolleybus system forms part of the public transport network serving Kryvyi Rih, Ukraine.

== History ==
In operation since 1957, the system presently comprises 23 routes, and is managed by the Kryvyi Rih City Council. It uses a fleet of 76 trolleybuses, which partly are articulated vehicles. On 1 May 2021 Kryvyi Rih became the first city in Ukraine to introduce free travel in public transport for its citizens. In order not to pay for municipal transport one must show a special electronic "Kryvyi Rih Card".

== Network ==
- Пл. Визволення — ст. Кривий Ріг-Головний
- (a) Пл. Визволення — Автовокзал
- ст. Кривий Ріг — ст. Кривий Ріг-Головний
- тролейбусне депо No.2 — пл. Толстого
- Спорткомплекс (44 квартал) — ЦГЗК
- (a) мкрн. Зарічний — ст. Рокувата (працює у вихідні дні та на свята)
- Пл. Визволення — ПівдГЗК
- Пл. Визволення — КЦРЗ
- Спорткомплекс — ККХП-2
- Спорткомплекс — ПівнГЗК(РЗФ-1)
- ст. Кривий Ріг — КЦРЗ (через м-н Юність)
- КЦРЗ — КЦРЗ (по колу ч/з Юність, Більшовик, Піонер, 173 кв.)
- ПівнГЗК(РЗФ-1) — РЗФ-2
- ПЗРК — 10-й мікрорайон (раз на годину)
- Спорткомплекс — 10-й мікрорайон (раз на 2 години)
- Пл. Визволення — ст. Кривий Ріг-Головний (через Розвилку)
- ст. Кривий Ріг — ст. Кривий Ріг-Головний (через Розвилку)
- вул. Серафимовича — вул. Вернадського (кільцевий)
- пл. Толстого — Пл. Визволення
- Авіаколедж — мкрн. Східний-3

== Rolling stock ==
=== Current fleet ===
| Image | Type | Modifications and subtypes | Board numbers | Depot Allocations | Count |
|---|---|---|---|---|---|
| | UMZ | T203, T1, T2, 168, 6205 | | | 68 |
| | ZiU-9 | | | | 29 |
| | ZiU-10 | | | | 8 |
| | LAZ | LAZ 12 | | | 6 |

== See also ==
- List of trolleybus systems in Ukraine
