= Vovnopriadylna (Kryvyi Rih Metrotram) =

Kryvyi Rih Metrotram station

General information
- Location: Fabric
- Coordinates: 47°58′39″N 33°28′51″E
- System: Kryvyi Rih Metrotram
- Operator: Kryvyi Rih Metro
Location

Vovnopriadylna (Ukrainian: Вовнопрядильна) is an unopened station of the Kryvyi Rih Metrotram.

== History ==
When the third stage of the Kryvyi Rih metro system was being planned, the Vovnopriadylna station was planned as a part of a development scheme for the area. Originally, the empty expanse that now surrounds the station was to be developed into a new housing district, with a factory located nearby. The factory near the station was eventually completed, but plans for the housing district were eventually abandoned due to lack of funding. The factory itself went out of business in 2001 due to financial issues. As a result, Vovnopriadylna is currently in the middle of nowhere, and with no passenger traffic at all, there are no plans to open the station in the future.

Without the presence of humans, homeless dogs have, over the years, made the empty station their home.

== Architecture ==
The completed section of the station consists of six small four-sided vaults and one large hexagonal vault, which was most likely intended as the place for the passenger concourse. The panels within the vault are made from aluminium.

The station is left unadorned and technical equipment is also absent. White concrete fencing surrounds the station to prevent intruders from entering.
