= Trams in Kryvyi Rih =

Operation
- Locale: Kryvyi Rih, Ukraine
- Status: Operational
- Routes: 13
- Owner: Kryvyi Rih City Council
- Operator: "KRShT"

Infrastructure
- Track gauge: 1,524 mm (5 ft)
- Propulsion system: Electricity
- Stock: 172

Statistics
Electric tram era: since 1935
- Status: Still running
- Operator: Kryvyi Rih City Council
- Track gauge: 1524
- Propulsion system: Electricity
Overview
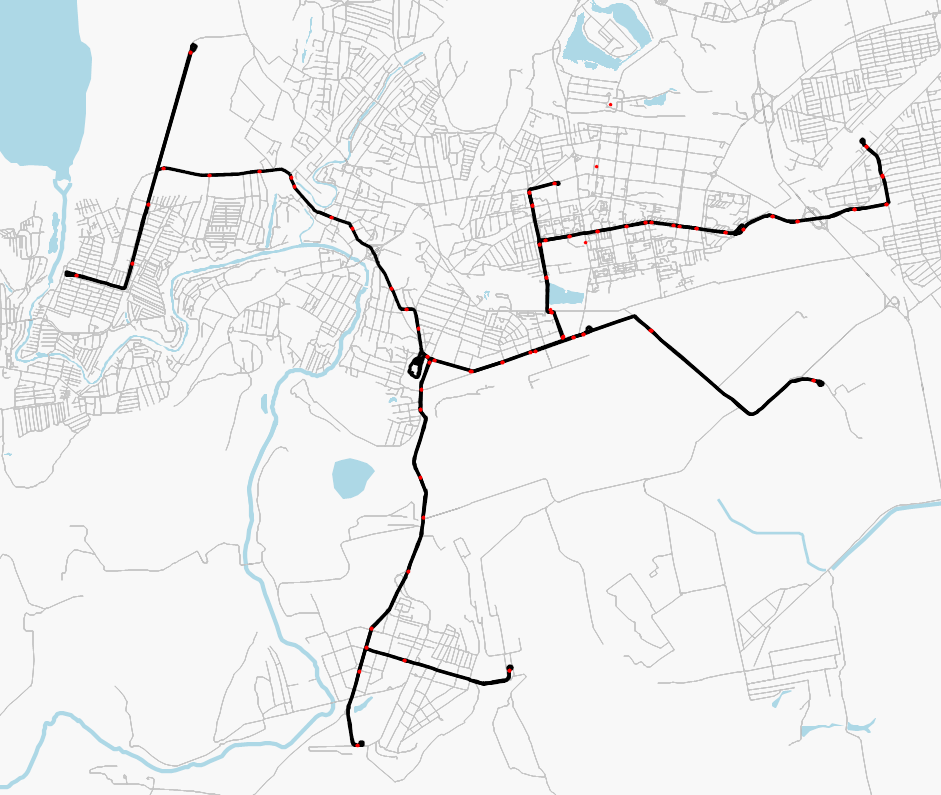

The Kryvyi Rih tramway network is part of the public transport system of Kryvyi Rih, city in Ukraine. The tram network serves as the backbone of the transit system, serving both under the name of the "Kryvyi Rih Rapid Tram" municipal corporation.

In operation since 1935, the Kryvyi Rih tram network is one of world's largest tram networks, operating on 88.1 kilometres of total route. As of 2014, it was composed of 13 lines. The system is operated by the Kryvyi Rih City Council under the supervision of the city community.

On May 1, 2021, Kryvyi Rih became the first city in Ukraine to introduce free travel in public transport for its citizens. In order not to pay for municipal transport one must show a special electronic "Kryvyi Rih Citier Card".

On April 27, 2022, free travel in Kryvyi Rih became available to all the tram, bus, trolleybus and the Metro passengers.

== Network ==
Line number	End stations	Stock type
	Dombudivnykiv - Pyvzavod	КТМ-5 КТМ-8 К-1 71-608
	Domnobudivnykiv - Bukovynska	КТМ-5 КТМ-8 К-1 71-608
3М	Zarichna — Zbahachuvalna str.	Tatra KT3UA Tatra T3
		КТМ-5 КТМ-8 К-1 71-608
4М	Zarichna - PivdGZK	Tatra KT3UA Tatra T3
		КТМ-5 КТМ-8 К-1 71-608
		КТМ-5 КТМ-8 К-1 71-608
		КТМ-5 КТМ-8 К-1 71-608
		КТМ-5 КТМ-8 К-1 71-608
		КТМ-5 КТМ-8 К-1 71-608
		КТМ-5 КТМ-8 К-1 71-608
		КТМ-5 КТМ-8 К-1 71-608
		КТМ-5 КТМ-8 К-1 71-608
		КТМ-5 КТМ-8 К-1 71-608
		КТМ-5 КТМ-8 К-1 71-608

== Rolling stock ==
=== Current fleet ===
Image	Type	Modifications and subtypes	Board numbers	Depot Allocations	Count
	Tatra T3	Tatra T3SU, T3R.P, Tatra T3SUCS, T3RP, K3R-N			
	Tatra KT3UA	KT3UA			
	КТМ-5	КТМ-5			52
	71-608	71-608К, 71-608КM			16
	Tatra-Yug K1				7

== See also ==
- Kryvyi Rih Metrotram
- List of town tramway systems in Europe
