= Kryvyi Rih Metrotram =

Rapid transit system in Kryvyi Rih, Ukraine

Kryvyi Rih Metrotram Криворізький метротрамвай

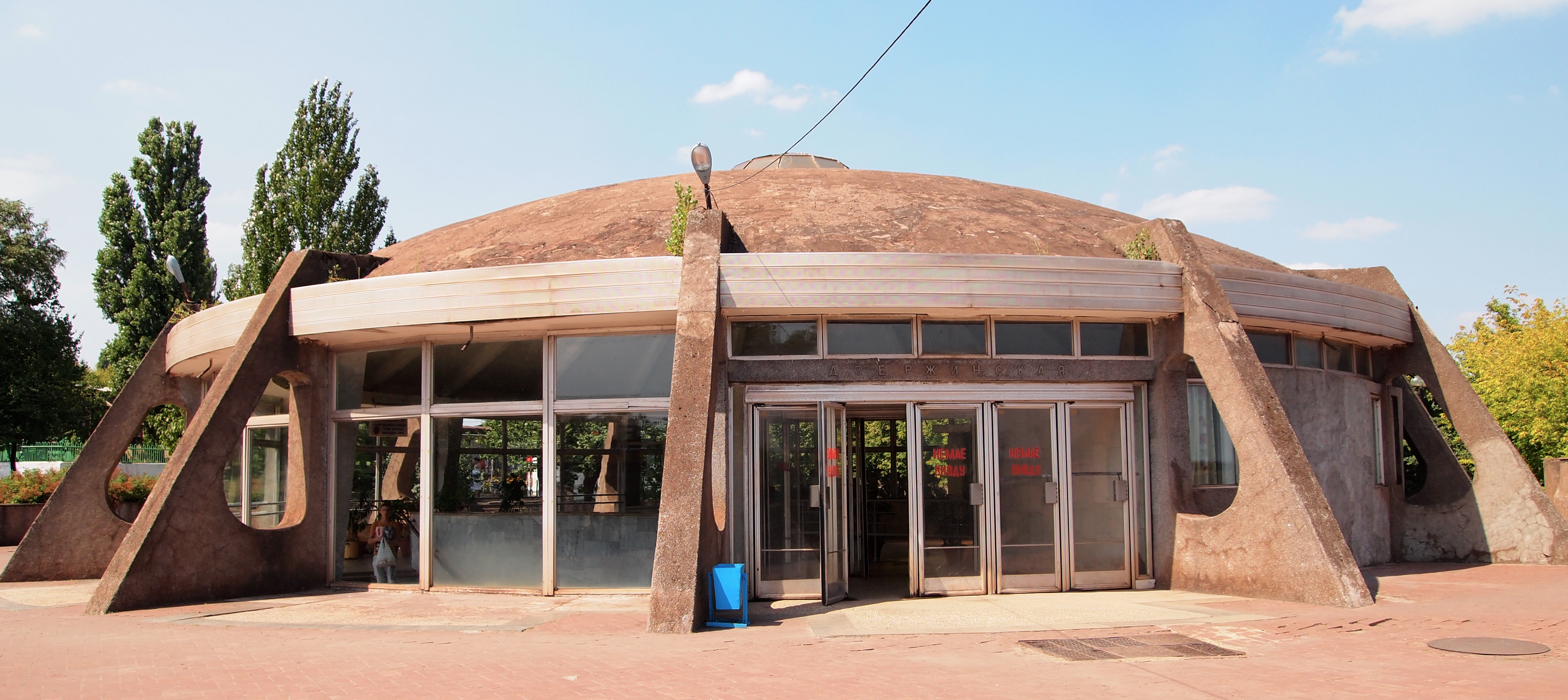
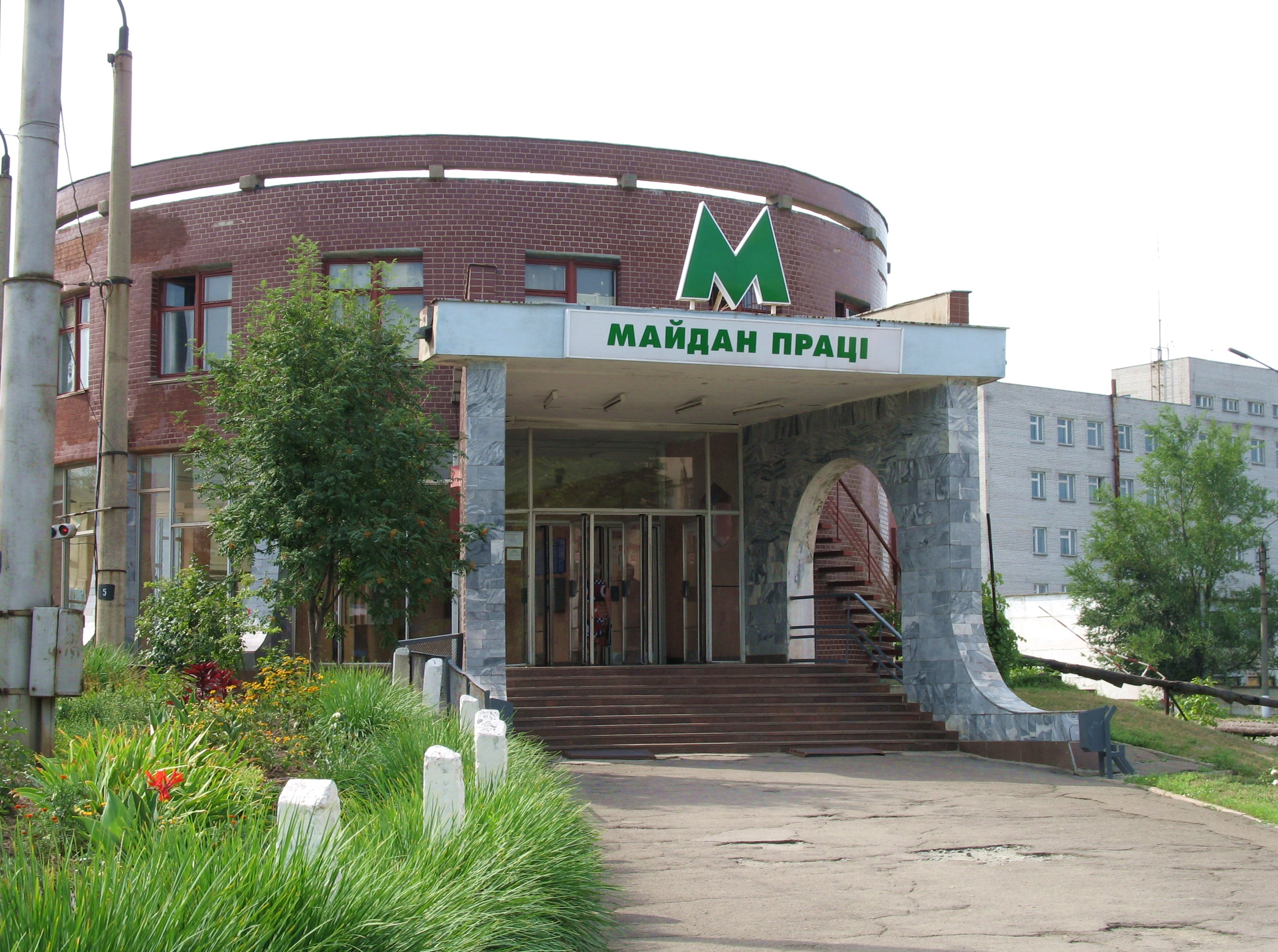
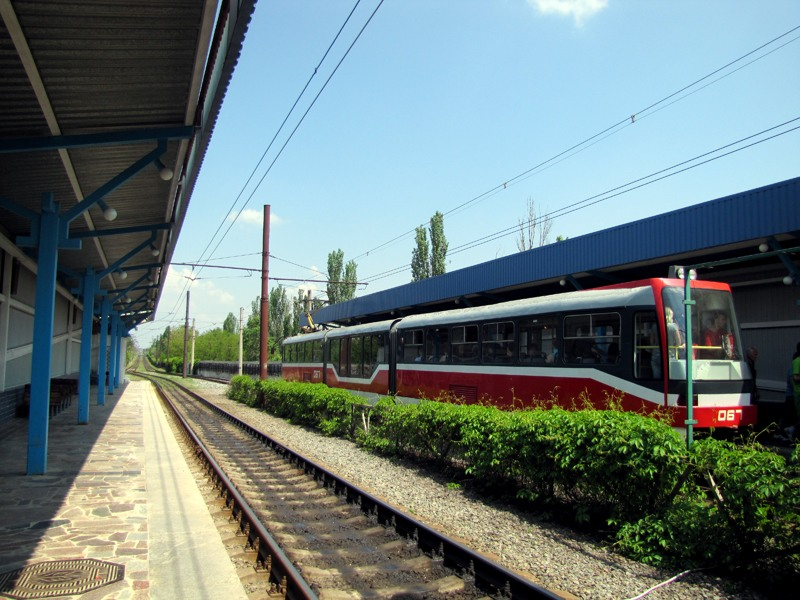
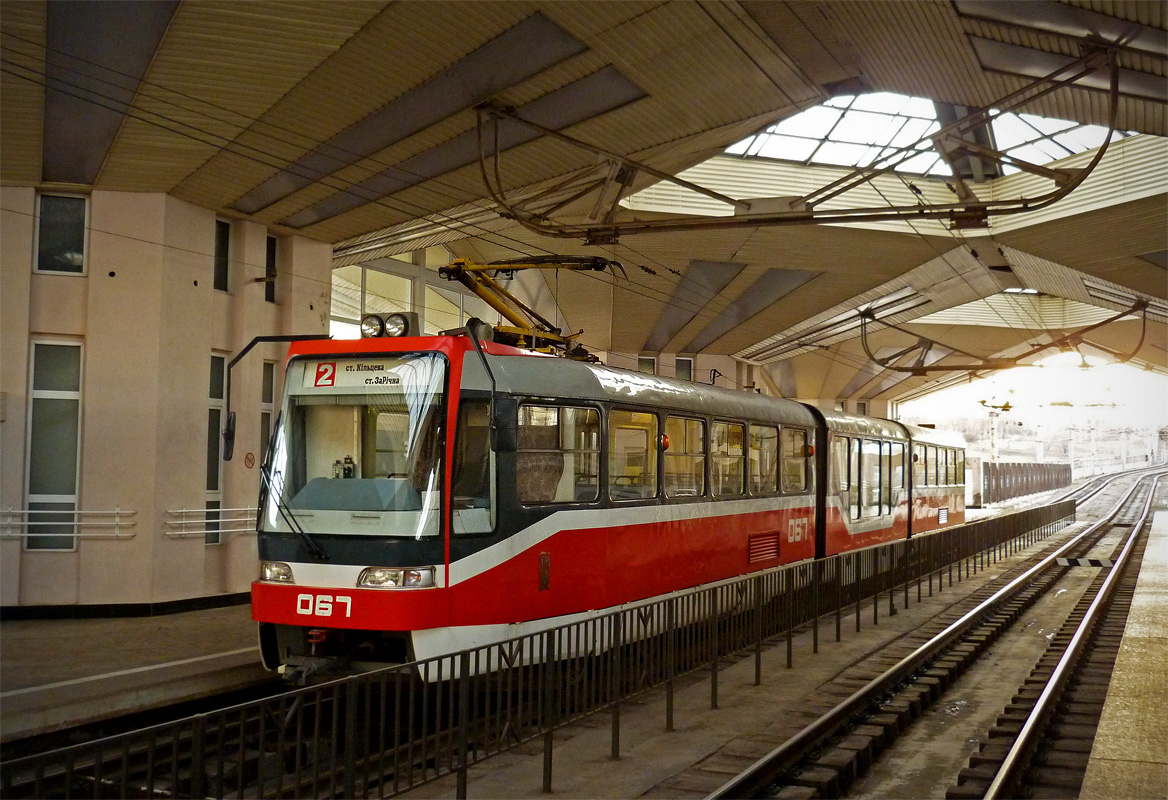

Overview
- Owner: Kryvyi Rih City Council
- Locale: Kryvyi Rih, Ukraine
- Transit type: Light rail / Light metro
- Number of lines: 2 (4 routes)
- Number of stations: 11 (+1 abandoned)
- Daily ridership: 80 000 (2020)
- Annual ridership: 40 000 000

Operation
- Began operation: 26 December 1986
- Operator: KP "Shvydkisnyi Tramvai"
- Number of vehicles: 79
- Train length: 2 – 3 (rarely 1) tramcars
- Headway: 2 – 5 minutes (peak hours); 2 – 7 (off-peak); 10 – 15 (before closure); (source)

Technical
- System length: 17.7 km (11.0 mi)
- Track gauge: 1,520 mm (4 ft 11 27/32 in)
- Average speed: 45 km/h (28 mph)
- Top speed: 69 km/h (43 mph)

The Kryvyi Rih Metrotram (colloquially: Kryvyi Rih Metro), officially the Kryvyi Rih Rapid Tram (Ukrainian: Криворізький швидкісний трамвай, romanized: Kryvorizkyi shvydkisnyi tramvai) is a partially underground rapid transit light rail system that serves the city of Kryvyi Rih, the seventh-largest city in Ukraine. Similar systems in other parts of Europe are known as pre-metro or Stadtbahn.

== History ==
=== Planning and construction ===
The design of the Metrotram seen in Kryvyi Rih has its roots in the socialist urban planning guidelines that were formulated in the 1960s, based on models of the emergence of new urban centers and the transport arrangements that would suit them, in particular, how a small settlement would grow into a full-sized city, and at which point a rapid transit system would need to be built.

At the time, Kryvyi Rih already had a developed tram network, but like most urban centers, overcrowding and widespread congestion proved too much for the light rail to serve as the main transport arteries. Moreover, the city was destroyed in World War II and rebuilt, with all the requirements of a modern city considered in planning. The city was chosen to test whether the construction of a full-scale metro system could be avoided by adopting a light rail design for a socialist city, one that uses tram rolling stock but meets the standards of the metro. Also, the Metrotram was intended to serve only an interim, albeit necessary, role, with provision for conversion into a full rapid transit system.

The project was developed in 1972 by the Kharkiv Institute "UkrkomunNDIproekt", the Ministry of Housing and Communal Services of the Ukrainian SSR and "Kharkivmetroproekt" of the Ministry of Construction of the Ukrainian SSR. According to Soviet standards, the construction of the metro was envisaged only in cities with a population of over a million, but the population of Kryvyi Rih in the 1970s was only about 700 thousand residents.

Construction began in 1974. In Kryvyi Rih, the Metrotram route was built from scratch, with most of the section running along the surface, except for underground sections in the city center wherever needed. All of the underground dimensions were made with provision for eventual conversion into a full metro system.

Each metro station is an architectural monument for its neighborhood, in the style of late Soviet architecture.

=== Opening ===
On 26 December 1986, the first stage of construction, a 8 km (5.0 mi) long segment, opened with four stations, "Maidan Pratsi", "Zhovtneva", "Maidan Artema", and a temporary stop near today's "Mudriona" station. This metrotram network became the third underground rapid transit system in Ukraine, after Kyiv and Kharkiv metros.

Between 1988 and 1989, a second segment opened southwards with "Budynok Rad" opening first on 13 February 1988, while "Prospekt Metalurhiv" and "Kiltseva" opened on 2 May 1989.

=== Since independence ===
In 1992, the construction of the third line began shortly after independence amid a difficult economic situation in the country, with these stations also built according to metro standards. After the commissioning of the new section, the "Maidan Pratsi" station was located away from the main line, although still quite close. So to differentiate, the route names were added an "M" into 1М and 2М.

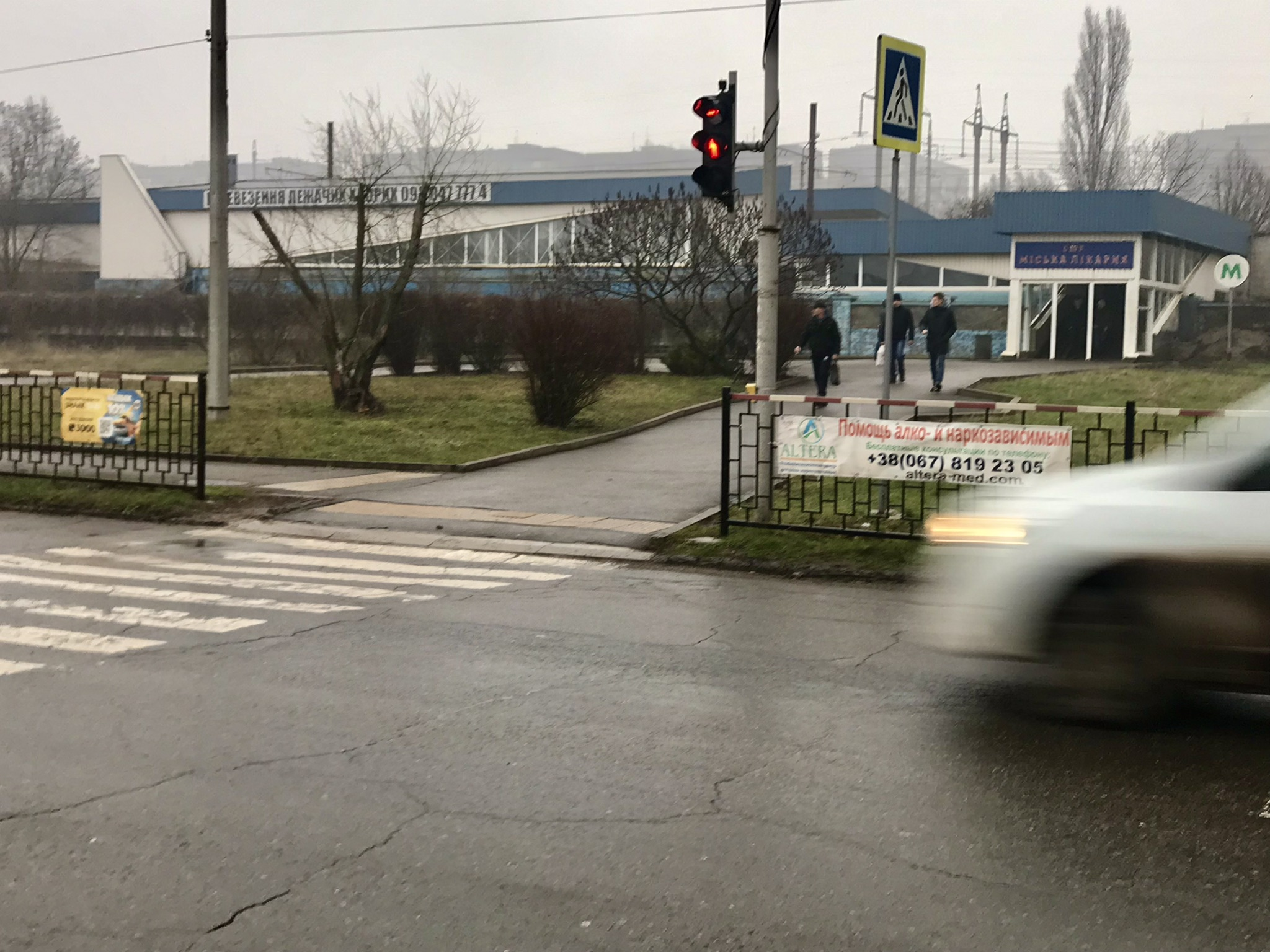
"Miska Likarnia (City Hospital) station opened in 2001

On 26 October 1999, this new line opened two stations, "Industrialna" and "Zarichna", less than the five originally plan. On 19 June 2000, "Elektrozavodskaya" station was opened, and on 19 May 2001 "Miska Likarnia" station opened. "Vovnopriadylna" station was also supposed to open, but was never completed due to lack of passenger demand after plans for a residnetial area nearby was cancelled.

By the year 2001, the metrotram system measured at almost 18 km (11.2 mi) with 11 stations.

On 28 February 2007, the Kryvyi Rih City Council voted to rename "Zhovtneva" station to "Hutovsky" station in honor of late mayor Hryhoriy Hutovsky who governed during the construction and opening of the Metrotram.

In 2012, the southern end of the line was connected with the city's conventional tram system and an additional route 3М was created extending to the nearby metallurgical plant and closest tram stops, which opened on 25 May 2012. During this project, "Kiltseva" station needed renovation to allow for the expansion, but led to controversy over its high cost of about ₴ 3.8 million hryvnias (about $250 thousand USD). Criticism also arose over the poor vehicle quality leading to several breakdowns and traffic complications on the first day of opening.

In 2016, three stations in the system were renamed to comply with decommunization in Ukraine, with "Hutovsky" renamed as "Soniachna", "Maidan Artema" renamed as "Vechirnii Bulvar", and "Dzerzhinskaya" renamed as "Mudriona".

In Winter 2017, a new route 4М towards NKGZK was launched, and also, route 3М was extended to PivdHZK (Southern Mining and Processing Plant).

On 1 May 2021 Kryvyi Rih became the first city in Ukraine to introduce free travel in public transport for its citizens. In order not to pay for municipal transport one must show a special electronic "Kryvyi Riher's Card".

In Spring 2022 travel by city public transport became free for all passengers.

On January 8, 2024, a missile strike by Russian occupiers damaged the line and contact network on the section between "Vechirnii Bulvar" and "Miska Likarnia" stations, with traffic reopening three days later.

=== Timeline ===
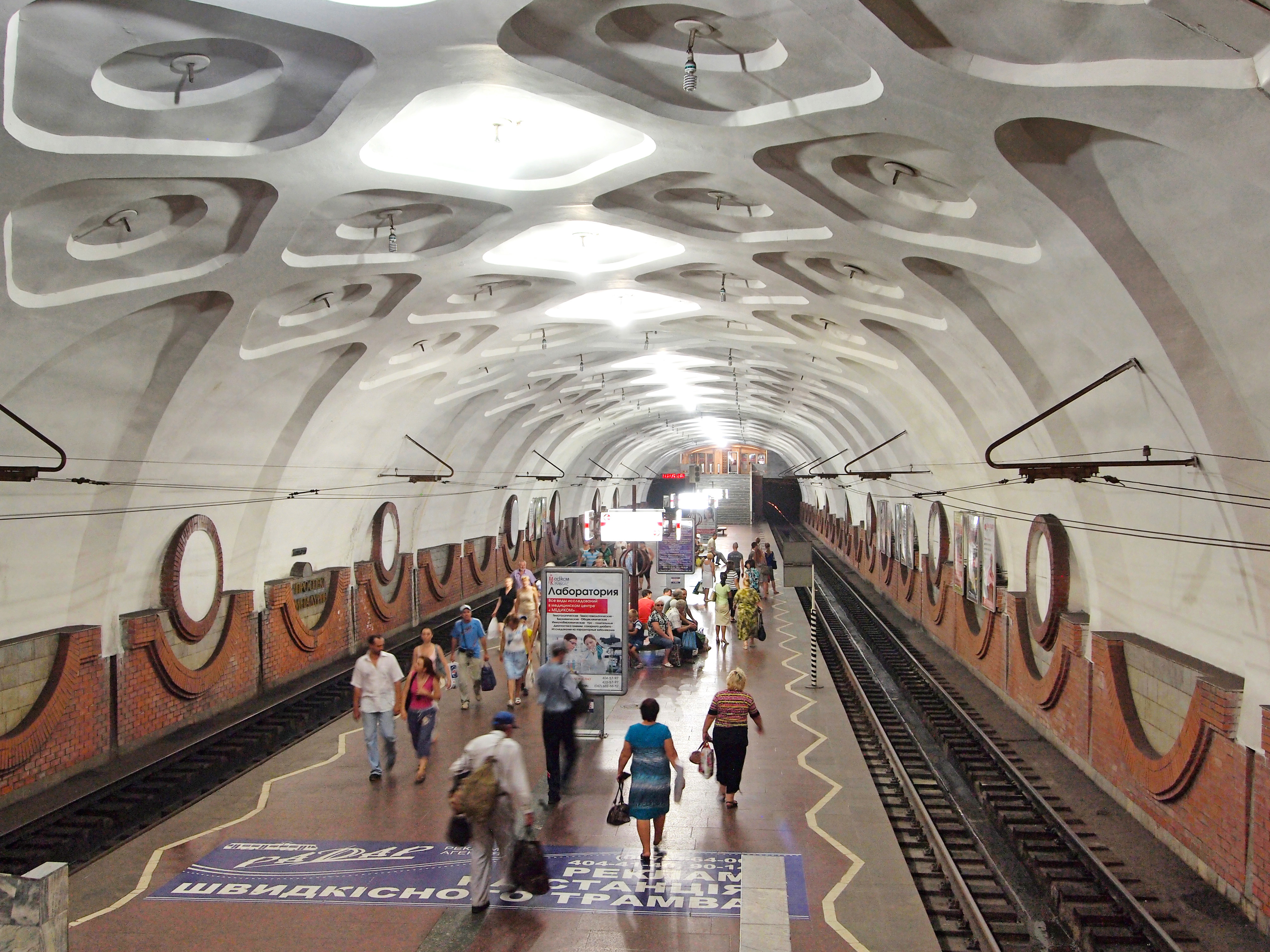
Prospekt Metalurhiv, like the other stations, was built up to a full metro standard

Segment	Date opened	Length	Stations
Maidan Pratsi—Mudriona (Excluding Miska Likarnia)	December 26, 1986	7.7 km	4
Budynok Rad	February 23, 1988	-	1
Mudriona—Kiltseva	May 2, 1989	4.5 km	2
Soniachna—Zarichna (Excluding Elektrozavodska)	October 25, 1999	5.5 km	2
Elektrozavodska	June 9, 2000	-	1
Miska Likarnia	May 19, 2001	-	1
Zarichna—Kiltse KMK	May 25, 2012	-	-
Zarichna—NKGZK	February 16, 2017	-	-
Zarichna—PHZK	February 16, 2017	-	-
Total:		17.7 km	11 stations

== Facts and figures ==
The system is operated by the city municipal company and has a total length of 17.7 km, 7 km of which (40%) are fully underground. The entire system has 11 stations: 4 of them are located underground, 3 stations have only underground vestibules and also 2 stations are elevated — all built up to metro standard. In addition, there is one station, Vovnopriadylna, that was built but is currently not opened due to the absence of passenger traffic in the area. There are four routes: Kiltseva — Maidan Pratsi, Kiltseva — Zarichna, Zarichna — NKGZK tram stop and Zarichna — PGZK tram stop, with a branch at Soniachna, separating two lines.

The rolling stock used on the system consists of Tatra T3 tramcars in plenty different modifications. Two depots serve the system: one is located near Maidan Pratsi station; the other one is situated in Tram Park in the southwestern edge of Metalurhiinyi District. For more convenient tram turnarounds, there are turning circles at both ends of the lines, and there also are some more along the pathway.

== Prospects for growth ==
When the Soviet Union collapsed, the development of rapid transit systems in all of the former republics was deprived of funding and neglected. In many cases, cities that acquired a metro system in the late 1980s only gained an initial stretch with passenger flows barely making the systems significant. In metrotram cities, however, the reverse was the case.

The KRMT carries 40 million people annually, with a record of 56 million in 1997. The light rail's compatibility and low construction costs have shown it to be superior to the "hard rail" in every respect, and, unlike the metros in some other post-Soviet cities, KR Metro now functions as an important traffic artery.

== See also ==
- Charleroi Metro
- Málaga Metro
- Metro (Minnesota)
- Porto Metro
- Seville Metro
- Tyne and Wear Metro
