= Metalurhiinyi District =

City district of Kryvyi Rih, Ukraine

Metalurhiinyi District Металургійний район
- Urban district
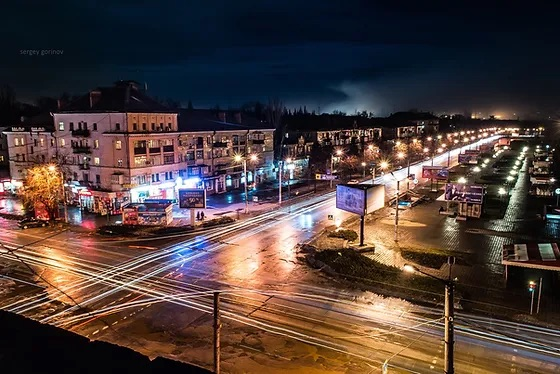
- Metallurgists Avenue

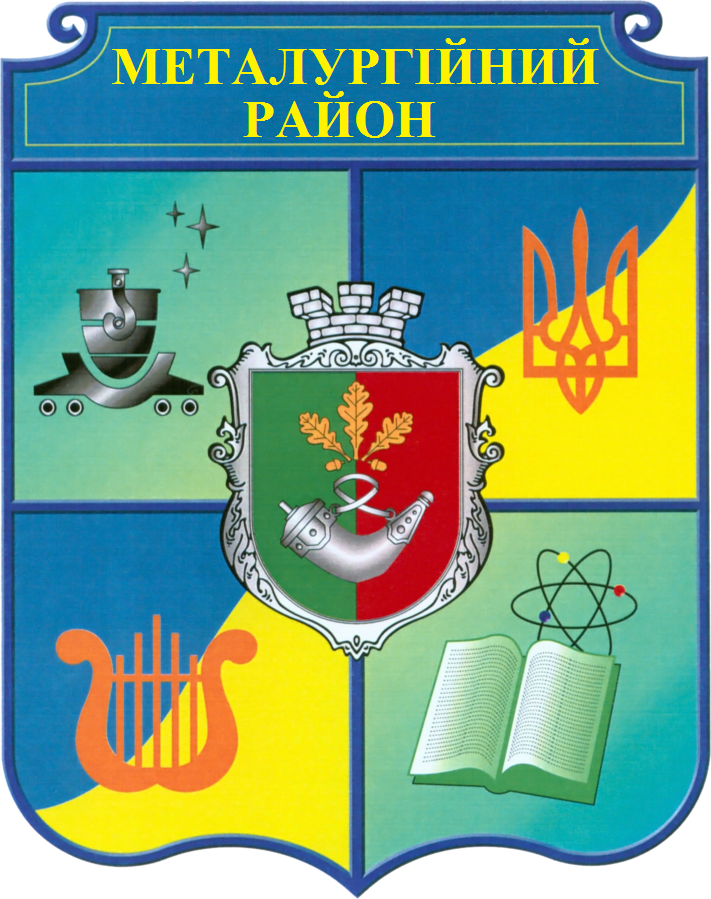
- Coat of arms

- Coordinates: 47°52′09″N 33°24′24″E
- Country: Ukraine
- City: Kryvyi Rih
- Established: 1936

Area
  - Total: 51.9 km^{2} (20.0 sq mi)

Population
  - Total: 65,600
  - Density: 1,260/km^{2} (3,270/sq mi)
- Time zone: UTC+2 (EET)
  - Summer (DST): UTC+3 (EEST)
- Area code: 50000

The Metalurhiinyi District (Ukrainian: Металургійний район, romanized: Metalurhiinyi raion, lit. 'Metallurgical District') is one of seven administrative urban districts (raions) of the city of Kryvyi Rih, located in southern Ukraine. It was formerly known as Dzerzhynskyi District, until the year 2016.
