= Maidan Pratsi (Kryvyi Rih Metrotram) =

Kryvyi Rih Metrotram station

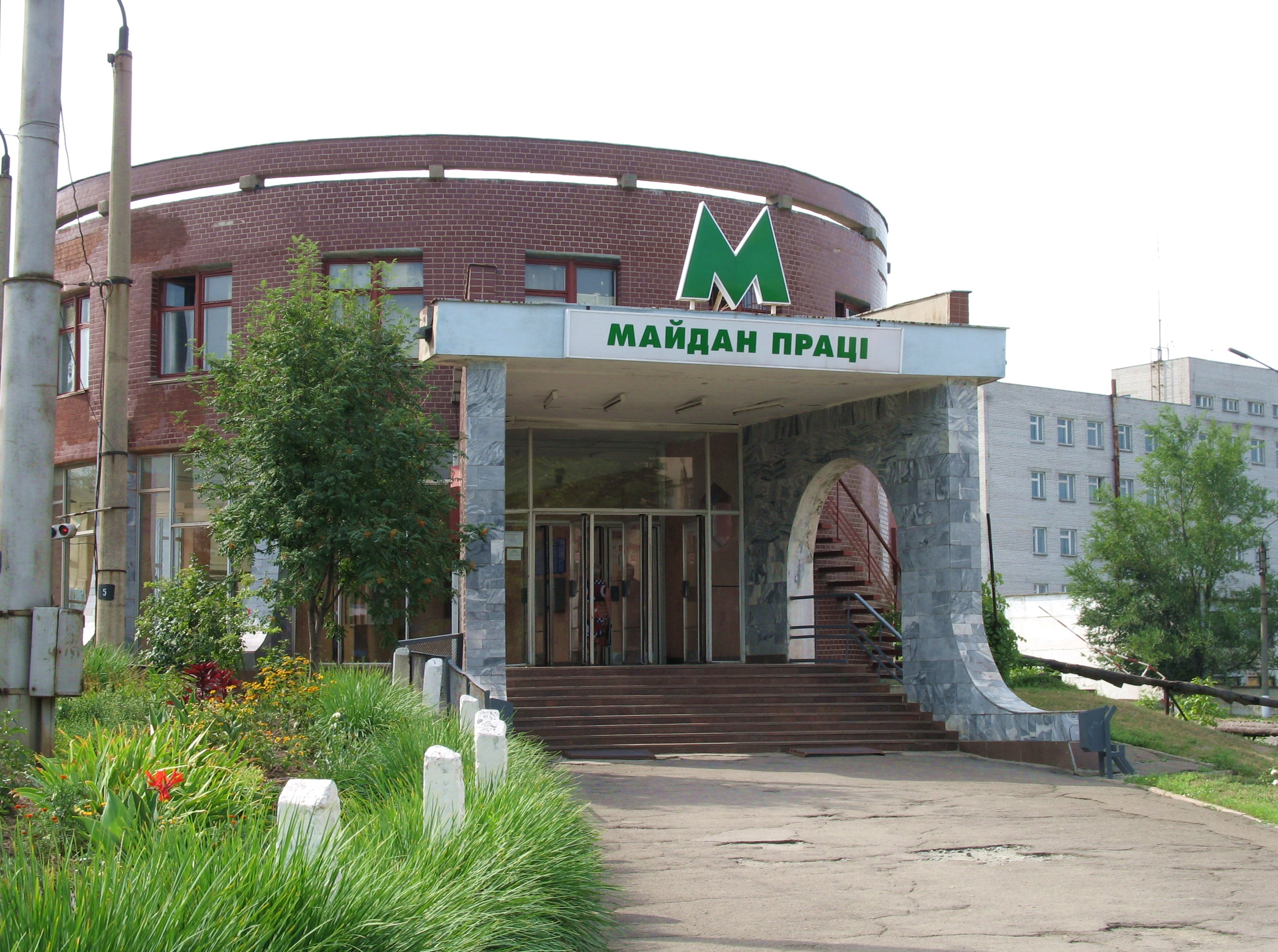
- Station vestibule

General information
- Coordinates: 47°57′49″N 33°27′50″E
- System: Kryvyi Rih Metrotram
- Owner: Kryvyi Rih Metrotram

History
- Opened: 29 December 1986

Services
Preceding station	Kryvyi Rih Metrotram	Following station
Soniachna towards Kiltseva	Route 1	Terminus
Location

Maidan Pratsi (Ukrainian: Майдан Працi; Russian: Площадь Труда, romanized: Ploschad Truda) is a station on the Kryvyi Rih Metrotram. Opened on 29 December 1986, it was the original northern terminus of the system and remains the terminus of the route №1.

The station was built as a multi-platform complex, located on a tram reversal ring, with only one of the three platforms being housed in a formal structure, whilst the rest are typical tram stops. This is due to the station being located next to the system's depot, which results in the unusual appearance of the station. Trams coming into the station first drop off the passengers on a standard platform, before picking up new passengers on the covered structure and continuing southbound. For the trams going into the depot, there is a third platform located slightly north of the station. Ironically it is the only way that passengers coming from route №2 can get off at this station.

The structure of the second platform consists of a concrete semi-structure with a rotunda vestibule and a granite covered platform with white tiles on the wall. In addition there are a series of portals that have a semicircular ledge with a wooden bench on the perimeter. The exterior of the station, along with the ledges, are faced with dark-cherry coloured tiles that appear as bricks.

When in 1999 the system was extended there were discussions on closing the station, or moving it onto the main line, however this plan was abandoned in favour of keeping it as it is, mostly out of the lack of finances to carry out a complex reconstruction, but also out of the passenger flow; the station does get a large number of people because, unlike the nearby new Industrialna, it is located right in the middle of the Hirnytske microraion and is right next to the KVRZ plant.

In 2004, the station also saw the finale of the Ukrainization campaign, the Russian sign on the vestibule was replaced by the Ukrainian one.
