= Kiltseva (Kryvyi Rih Metrotram) =

Kryvyi Rih Metrotram station

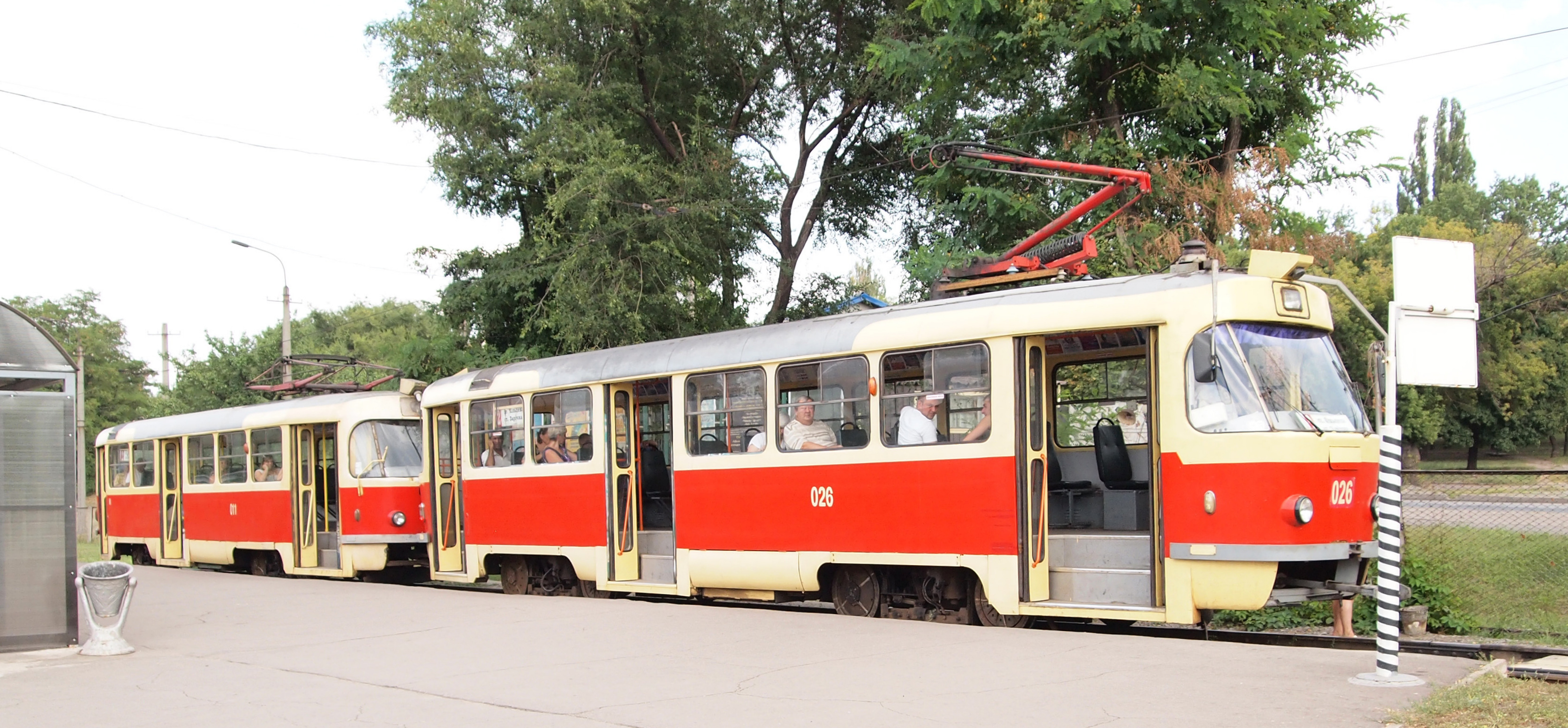
- Kiltseva

General information
- Coordinates: 47.8883°N 33.3867°E
- System: Kryvyi Rih Metrotram
- Owner: Kryvyi Rih Metrotram

History
- Opened: 2 May 1989

Services
Preceding station	Kryvyi Rih Metrotram	Following station
Terminus	Route 1	Prospekt Metalurhiv towards Maidan Pratsi
Terminus	Route 2	Prospekt Metalurhiv towards Zarichna
Druha Miska Likarnia towards Vulytsia Zbahachuvalna	Route 3 transfer at KNEU	Prospekt Metalurhiv towards Zarichna
Druha Miska Likarnia towards PivdHZK	Route 4 transfer at KNEU	Prospekt Metalurhiv towards Zarichna
Location

Kiltseva (Ukrainian: Кiльцева) is a station of the Kryvyi Rih Metrotram. It opened on 2 May 1989, as the last station of the second stage, and is the southern terminus of the system.

The station is a standard tram reversal ring which contains a series of pavilions and covered platforms. However, due to the left-hand operation of the final three stations, the direction is clockwise, which means that passengers are let in and out onto the middle of the ring. The station located next to the intersection of the Nikopol Highway with the Sviatoheorhiivska Street, and is served by a number of urban transport routes, including a standard city tram. All of the stops are linked by a series of underground passages, between the Kiltseva platforms there is an underground vestibule situated inside the subway.

From the very start, the station was built as a temporary stop, with plans for another extension to the south primarily to the railway station Kryvyi Rih-Zakhidny and then into the southern Inhuletskyi District, but not before passing through the famous Kryvorizhstal (now ArcelorMittal) plant. Actually part of the track from Prospekt Metalurhiv, after leaving the tunnel passes on a 300-meter bridge over the fire pond of the latter plant. In total, this would raise the length of the system by 6.5 kilometers and make it the most important transport artery. The station contained a gate with the city tram network next to the station which was used for service needs; since 2012 station serves as a transfer point to the Institute station of the metrotram's route 3M.
