= Zarichna (Kryvyi Rih Metrotram) =

Kryvyi Rih Metrotram station

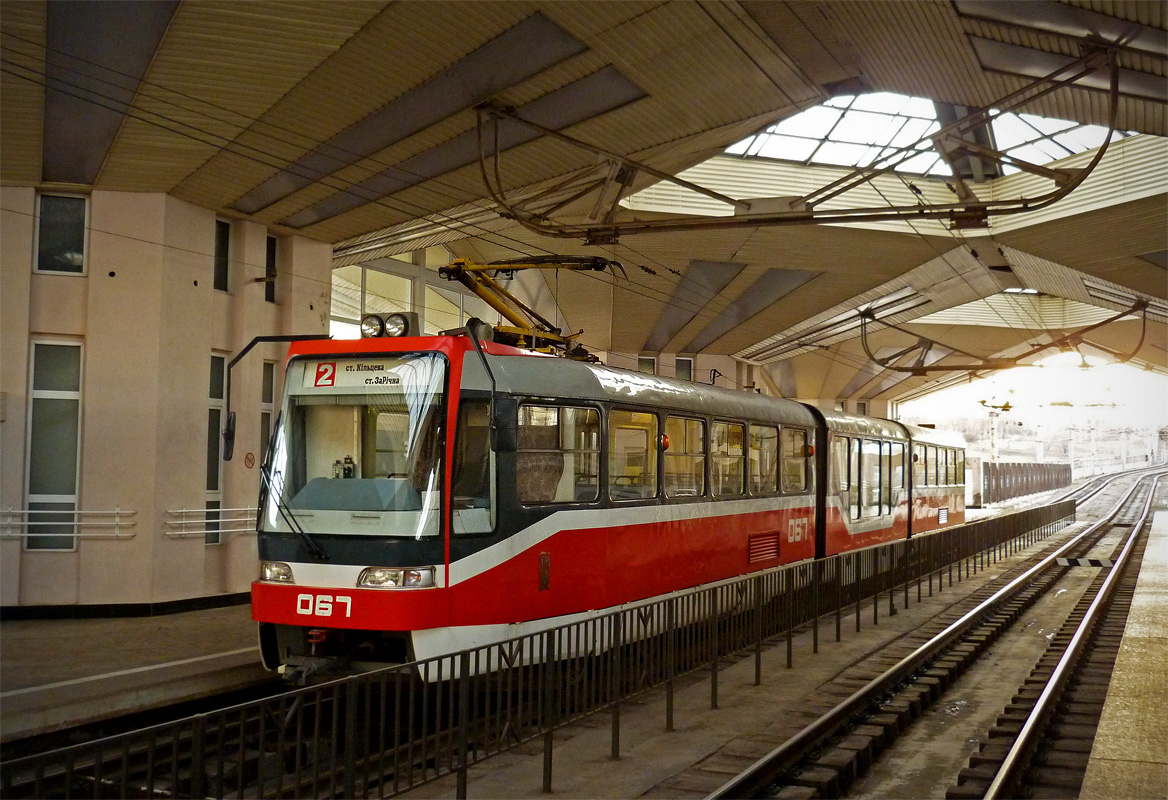
- View of the station platform

General information
- Coordinates: 48°00′12″N 33°29′53″E
- System: Kryvyi Rih Metrotram
- Owner: Kryvyi Rih Metrotram

History
- Opened: 25 October 1999

Services
Preceding station	Kryvyi Rih Metrotram	Following station
Elektrozavodska towards Kiltseva	Route 2	Terminus
Elektrozavodska towards Vulytsia Zbahachuvalna	Route 3	Terminus
Elektrozavodska towards PivdHZK	Route 4	Terminus
Location

Zarichna (Ukrainian: Зарiчна; Russian: Заречная, romanized: Zarechnaya) is a station of the Kryvyi Rih Metrotram, and is presently the northern terminus of the system.

The station was opened on 25 October 1999 by the then president Leonid Kuchma and consists of a large two-story structure, with the ground floor consisting of a vestibule and the first floor being on platform level. Encasing it are two mushroom-shaped supports (five on each side), uniting in the top into single roofs. The finish is carried out mostly from plastics although aluminum, marble and granite are also present. However, the latter materials' low quantity is enough to create the impression of their absence. The platform floors are nevertheless riveted with labradorite.

Fifty meters to the north of the station is a reversal ring with a small hangar for stands and low-level repairs. In the near future the station might cease to be the terminus if a fourth stage of the tram is built to the Ternivskyi District of Kryvyi Rih.

The opening of the station was very important for the Metro Tram as a transport artery; for the city this is particularly evident as two interim stations prior were skipped. This allowed the length of the system to rise by a quarter, however as the district it is situated in is physically separated from the rest of the stations, it led to a dramatic increase in passenger flow through the tram.
