= Volodymyr Zelenskyy =

President of Ukraine since 2019

- Володимир Зеленський
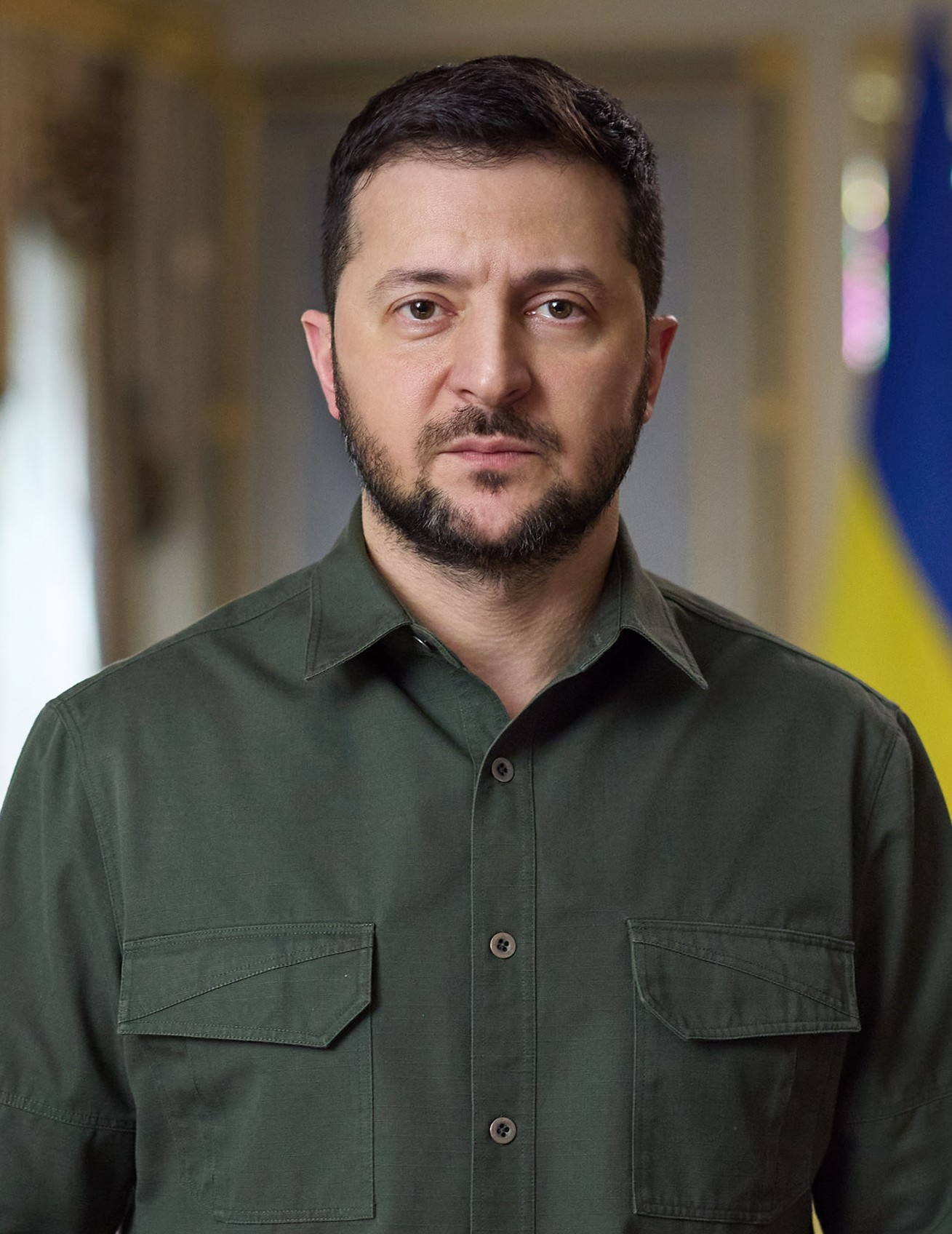
- Official portrait, 2022

6th President of Ukraine
- Incumbent
- Assumed office 20 May 2019
- Prime Minister: Volodymyr Groysman; Oleksiy Honcharuk; Denys Shmyhal; Yulia Svyrydenko; Serhii Koretskyi
- Preceded by: Petro Poroshenko

De facto leader of Servant of the People

Personal details
- Born: 25 January 1978 (age 48) Kryvyi Rih, Ukrainian SSR, Soviet Union
- Party: Servant of the People (since 2018) (Note: While the official website of the Central Election Commission listed Zelensky as an independent candidate in 2019, Zelenskyy is commonly assigned to the party Servant of the People, which he leads de facto and has publicly equated with himself.)
- Spouse: Olena Kyiashko (m. 2003)
- Children: 2
- Relatives: Oleksandr Zelenskyy (father)
- Education: Kryvyi Rih Institute of Economics (LLB)
- Website: president.gov.ua/en
- Zelenskyy's voice Zelenskyy delivering a joint address to the United States Congress during his visit to the United States; Recorded 21 December 2022

Volodymyr Oleksandrovych Zelenskyy (Note: Ukrainian: Володимир Олександрович Зеленський, romanised: Volodymyr Oleksandrovych Zelenskyi, pronounced [woloˈdɪmɪr olekˈsɑndrowɪdʒ‿zeˈlɛnʲsʲkɪj].; Zelenskyy is the passport transliteration used by his administration since 2019. Other transliterations include Ukrainian Volodymyr Zelensky or Zelenskyi, and Russian Vladimir Zelenskiy.) (born 25 January 1978) is a Ukrainian politician and former entertainer who has served as the sixth president of Ukraine since 2019. He took office five years after the start of the Russo-Ukrainian war with Russia's annexation of Crimea and invasion of the Donbas, and has continued to serve during the full-scale Russian invasion of Ukraine, which has been ongoing since February 2022. As well as visiting Ukrainian troops on the frontlines, Zelenskyy has often met world leaders, urging the international community to support Ukraine's resistance and its efforts to end Russia's war. Zelenskyy has called for a ceasefire and peace negotiations.

Born in Kryvyi Rih into a Russian-speaking Jewish family, Zelenskyy obtained a law degree at the city's Institute of Economics, but instead pursued a career in comedy and entertainment. Zelenskyy co-founded the production company Kvartal 95, which produced films, cartoons, and television shows including the television series Servant of the People, in which he played a fictional Ukrainian president. The series aired from 2015 to 2019 and was immensely popular. A political party with the same name as the television show was founded in March 2018 by Zelenskyy and other associates of Kvartal 95. During his campaign in the 2019 presidential election, Zelenskyy positioned himself as anti-establishment and anti-corruption, and had already been a frontrunner in opinion polls months before he declared his candidacy. He won the election with 73.23 percent of the vote in the second round, defeating incumbent president Petro Poroshenko in the biggest landslide in the history of Ukrainian presidential elections. His party won a landslide victory in the snap parliamentary election held shortly after his inauguration.

As president, Zelenskyy has been a proponent of e-government, and of unity between the Ukrainian- and Russian-speaking parts of the country's population. He makes extensive use of social media. During the first two years of his presidency, Zelenskyy oversaw some limited progress in tackling corruption in Ukraine, the ending of legal immunity for members of parliament (the Verkhovna Rada), as well as the country's response to the COVID-19 pandemic and subsequent economic recession.

During his early presidency, Zelenskyy attempted to end the war in Donbas by implementing the Minsk agreements through the "Steinmeier formula", and sought dialogue with Russian president Vladimir Putin. During 2021, there was a large Russian military buildup on Ukraine's borders and increased attacks by Russian proxy forces, sparking an international crisis. Zelenskyy said his military would not respond to provocations. He attempted to calm the Ukrainian people and asked for military support from NATO. On 24 February 2022, Russia launched a full-scale invasion of Ukraine. Zelenskyy remained in the capital Kyiv as it came under attack, declining international offers to evacuate him. He declared martial law across Ukraine and a general mobilisation of the armed forces. There have reportedly been numerous Russian assassination attempts on Zelenskyy since the invasion.

During the early peace negotiations, Zelenskyy demanded a ceasefire and Russian withdrawal, said he was willing to discuss Ukraine becoming a neutral country if given "real" security guarantees, and was willing to negotiate the status of Crimea and Donbas. He presented Ukraine's Peace Formula in late 2022, and the Victory Plan for Ukraine in late 2024. After Russia "annexed" southeastern Ukraine, Zelenskyy applied for Ukraine to join NATO. He has frequently visited frontline and newly liberated areas, and met with other world leaders, calling on the international community to support Ukraine's resistance, to provide Ukraine with military aid, and to impose tougher sanctions on Russia to bring an end to its war. Zelenskyy has called for an unconditional ceasefire and negotiations based on a 20-point peace plan.

Zelenskyy was named the Time Person of the Year for 2022. Rating Group polls in 2022 and 2026 have ranked Zelenskyy among the five most outstanding Ukrainians of all time. Zelenskyy's term was originally scheduled to end in May 2024, but the ongoing Russian invasion and the resulting martial law prevents the regularly scheduled presidential election from being held. He is expected to remain president for the duration of the war. Due to this extension of his term, Zelenskyy is the second-longest serving president after Kuchma.

== Early life ==
Volodymyr Oleksandrovych Zelenskyy was born into a Jewish family on 25 January 1978 in Kryvyi Rih, Dnipropetrovsk Oblast, Ukrainian SSR, Soviet Union. His mother, Rymma Zelenska, is a retired engineer. His father, Oleksandr Zelenskyy, a professor and computer scientist, is the head of the Department of Cybernetics and Computing Hardware at the Kryvyi Rih State University of Economics and Technology. Oleksandr's father, Semyon Zelenskyy, served as an infantryman, reaching the rank of colonel in the Red Army (in the 57th Guards Motor Rifle Division) during the Second World War. Semyon's father and three brothers were killed during the Holocaust. Zelenskyy said in March 2022 that, during a massacre, both of Semyon's parents were killed after German troops burned their home to the ground. Oleksandr's mother survived the Second World War after leaving Kryvyi Rih in an evacuation of Jews to Almaty, Kazakh SSR, and returned to the Ukrainian SSR after the war.

Before starting elementary school, Zelenskyy spent four years in Erdenet, Mongolia, where Oleksandr worked as a mining engineer from the mid-1970s to help build a copper mine, applying his abilities in computer science to mining. Zelenskyy grew up speaking Russian. At the age of 16, he took the Test of English as a Foreign Language and received an education grant to study in Israel, but Oleksandr did not allow him to go. Zelenskyy later earned a law degree from the Kryvyi Rih Institute of Economics but never worked in the legal field.

== Entertainment career ==
=== KVN (1995–2003) ===
At age 17, Zelenskyy joined his local team competing in KVN, a comedy competition popular across former Soviet countries. He was soon invited to join another Ukrainian team known as "Zaporizhzhia-Kryvyi Rih-Transit", where he became dance director and writer in 1995. The Transit team performed in KVN's Major League and eventually won in 1997 in a tie with Armenian opponents.

That same year, Zelenskyy created and headed a new team known as Kvartal 95 together with other Transit members, such as Oleksandr Pikalov and Olena Kravets; this team was named after the Kvartal 95 neighbourhood in Kryvyi Rih where he had grown up. From 1999 to 2003, Kvartal 95 performed in the highest open Ukrainian league of KVN as well as in the KVN Major League; they were the only Ukrainian team in the Moscow-based highest league of KVN. The team members lived in Moscow much of the time, without a fixed address and struggling financially; they constantly toured former Soviet countries.

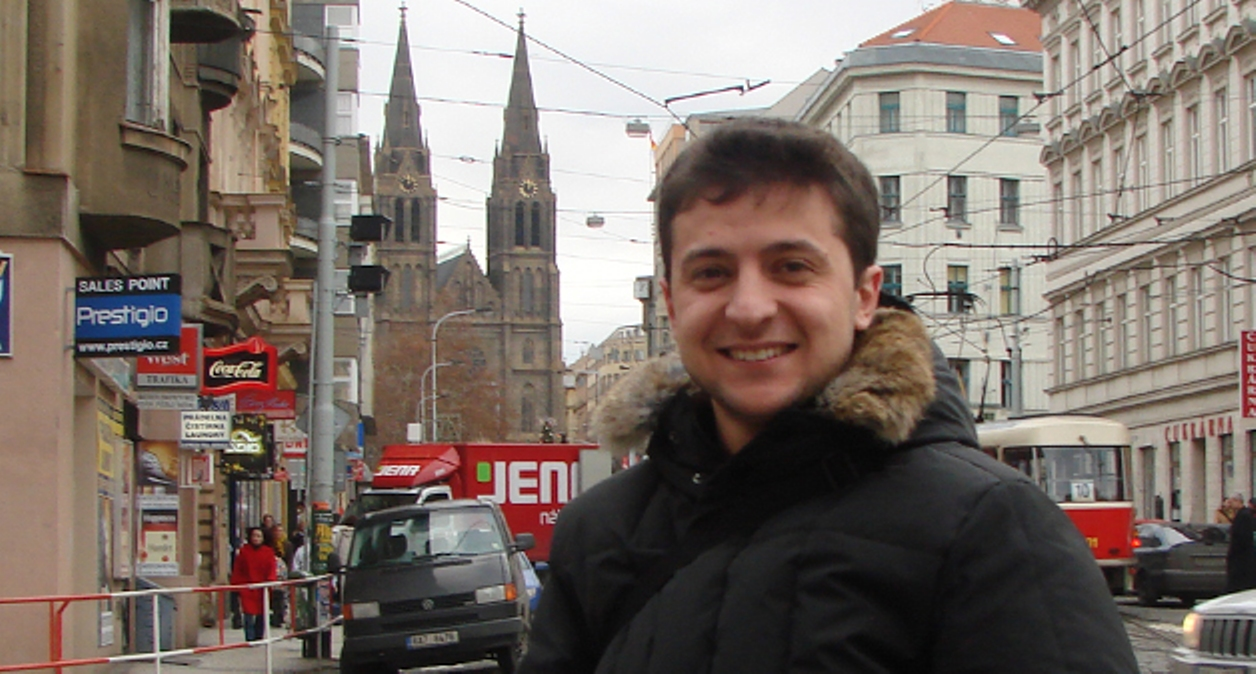
Zelenskyy in Prague in 2009

Zelenskyy and Kvartal 95 left KVN in 2003, after prolonged tension with KVN's Russian management over money, political censorship, and other disputes. Finally, Zelenskyy declined a highly paid job offer from KVN management that would have required him to abandon Kvartal 95, choosing instead to stay with his team and return to Ukraine. An incident where a Russian KVN producer used an antisemitic insult against Zelenskyy on stage also contributed to the split.

=== Kvartal 95 Studio (2003–2019) ===
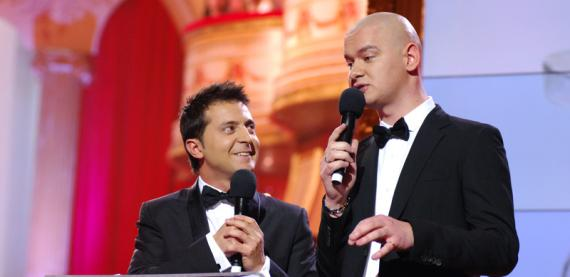
Zelenskyy (left) and Yevhen Koshovyi (right) co-hosting the opening portion of Teletriumph 2011, the national television awards of Ukraine. Kvartal 95 wrote the script and hosted the 2011 ceremony.

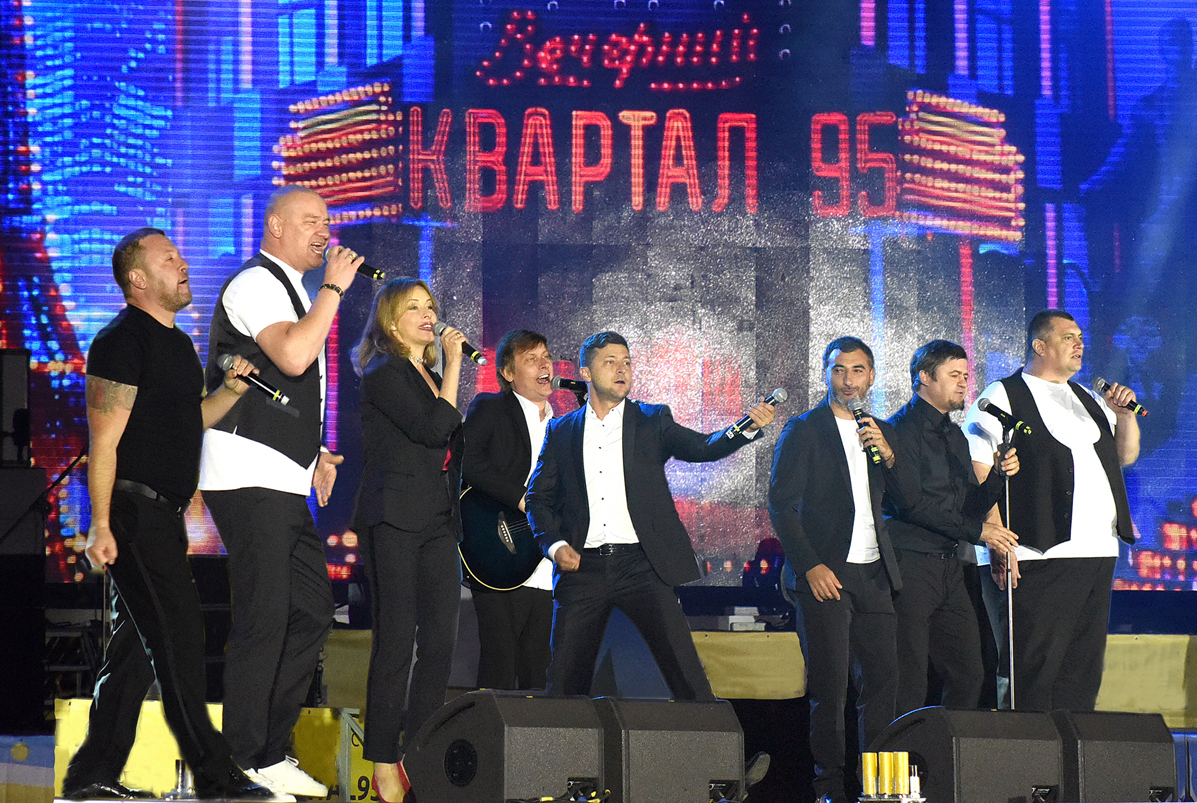
Zelenskyy (centre) performing with Kvartal 95 in 2018

After leaving KVN, the Kvartal 95 team moved to Kyiv, where Zelenskyy and the brothers Borys and Serhiy Shefir – who had been members of the Transit KVN team – founded the Kvartal 95 Studio company in September 2003. That same year, Kvartal 95 started producing TV shows for the Ukrainian TV channel 1+1. In 2005, Kvartal 95 moved to the Ukrainian TV channel Inter, where they launched the Evening Kvartal comedy show the same year. This show's format was "theatre-style" with a mixture of skits, appearances by celebrities, and stand-up comedy; it included sketches on everyday life as well as political satire. Evening Kvartal was the most popular comedy television show in Ukraine in the 2000s, and over 85% of Ukrainians reported they had seen it by the time Zelenskyy became president in 2019. Kvartal 95 returned to 1+1 in 2012.

Kvartal 95 has been described by biographers as an "empire", a "comedy factory", and the "most successful production studio" in Ukraine. Apart from Evening Kvartal, the company also launched other show formats including Zelenskyy, such as Chisto News, League of Laughter, and Make the Comedian Laugh. By 2013, the third – a format in which contestants attempted to make comedians laugh – had been sold into China, Italy, and Finland, and Zelenskyy said in 2018 that he received royalties from 21 countries for the show.

As Zelenskyy's and Kvartal 95's popularity grew, he and they were frequently invited to host or perform at corporate and private events. Zelenskyy said in 2018 that he had performed in front of numerous presidents of post-Soviet countries, including his own predecessors in office, as well as then-Russian president Dmitry Medvedev.

In 2006, Zelenskyy won the first season of Ukraine's Dancing with the Stars.

Apart from comedy, Zelenskyy's film and television career included acting, scriptwriting, direction, and production. In 2008, he began to co-produce the sitcom Svaty ("The In-Laws"), which was highly popular in Ukraine and Russia and was nominated for the Most Popular Sitcom award at the Festival de Television de Monte-Carlo. The same year, he starred in the romantic comedy Love in the Big City, and subsequently in its 2010 and 2014 sequels; he was also co-writer of the second movie and co-producer of the third. In 2011, he co-wrote, co-produced, and played the male protagonist in the film Office Romance. Our Time. In 2012, he co-produced Rzhevsky Versus Napoleon and played the role of Napoleon. Zelenskyy also co-wrote, co-produced, and played the male lead in the 2012 romantic comedy 8 First Dates and its sequels 8 Best Dates (2012) and 8 New Dates (2014). He also co-wrote, co-produced, and co-directed the 2018 romantic comedy Me. You. He. She, and played the male protagonist.

Zelenskyy also recorded the voice of Paddington Bear in the Ukrainian dub of Paddington (2014) and Paddington 2 (2017), and the voice of Red in the Ukrainian dub of The Angry Birds Movie.

Zelenskyy was also popular in Russia before 2014. In 2011, he presented Russia's X Factor with Filipp Kirkorov and Alla Pugacheva. In 2013, he presented the New Year's Eve show on the Russia-1 channel with Russian comedian Maxim Galkin. After Russia's 2014 annexation of Crimea, Kvartal 95 closed its office in Moscow and began shutting down business ties with Russia; Zelenskyy himself stopped working in Russia by the end of 2014. By Zelenskyy's estimation, the decision to separate from the Russian market reduced Kvartal 95's average revenue per hour of TV programming from $200,000 to $30,000.

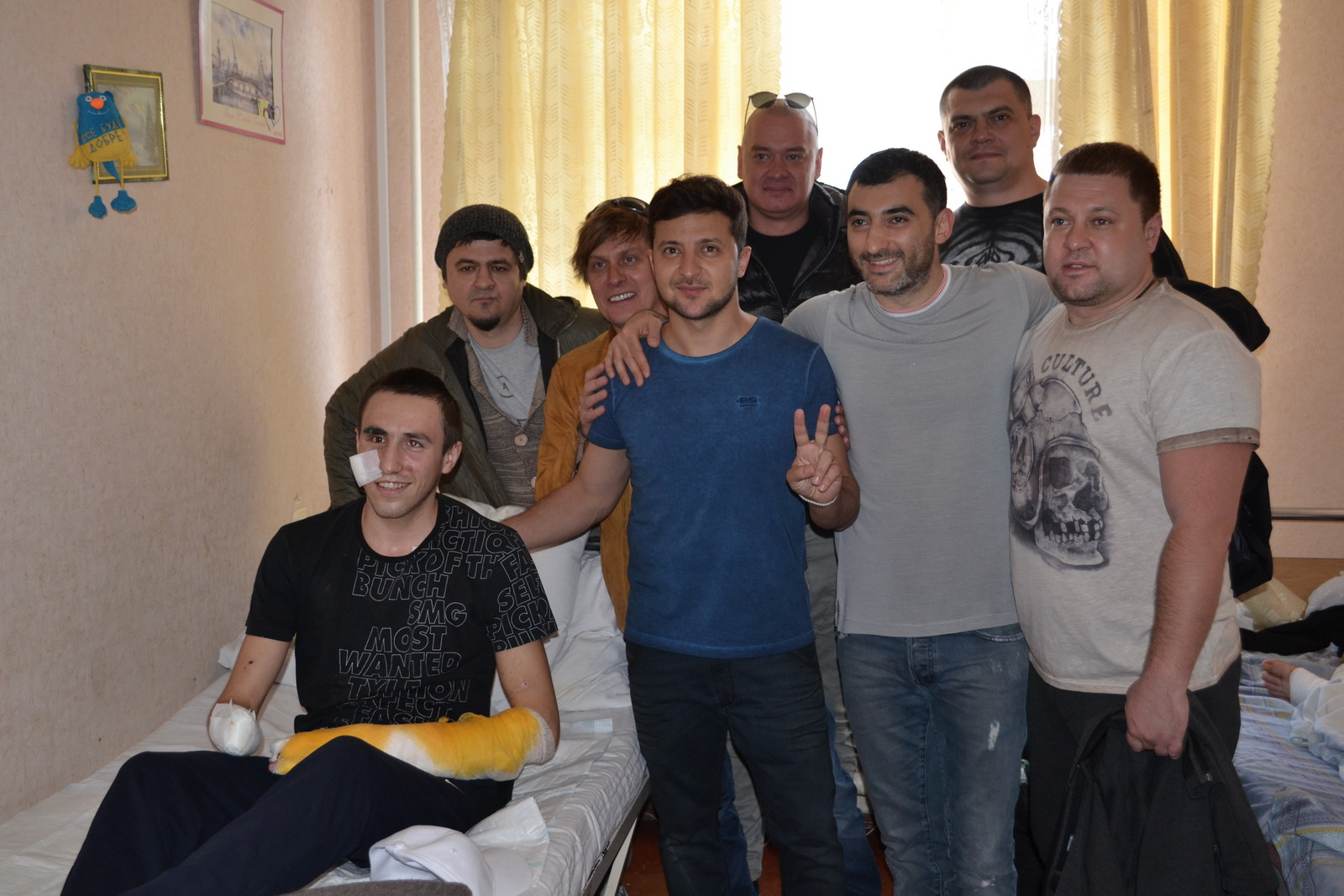
Zelenskyy (centre) with Kvartal 95 visiting wounded Ukrainian soldiers in Odesa in 2016

From 2014, Kvartal 95 also began visiting the war zone to perform for Ukrainian soldiers at the front in the war in Donbas. After Ukrainian media reported that Kvartal 95 had donated ₴1 million to the Ukrainian army after the start of the Russo-Ukrainian war, some Russian politicians and artists petitioned for a ban on Zelenskyy's works in Russia.

In August 2014, Zelenskyy spoke out against the intention of the Ukrainian Ministry of Culture to ban Russian artists from Ukraine. Since 2015, Ukraine has blacklisted some Russian artists and media deemed part of "information warfare", such as for "anti-Ukrainian rhetoric" or supporting the annexation of Crimea, and barred them from entering Ukraine. In 2018, Zelenskyy's Love in the Big City 2 was banned in Ukraine as it included a blacklisted Russian actor. Similarly, the sitcom Svaty co-produced by Zelenskyy was banned in Ukraine in 2017, after a Russian lead actor was blacklisted due to allegedly visiting occupied Crimea and supporting the annexation; however, it was unbanned in March 2019.

In 2015, Zelenskyy began to co-produce and star in the television series Servant of the People, where he played the role of the president of Ukraine. In the series, Zelenskyy's character was a high-school history teacher in his 30s who won the presidential election after a viral video showed him ranting against government corruption in Ukraine. The show ran for three seasons until Zelenskyy's own election as president.

In 2016, while he was the artistic director of Kvartal 95, Zelenskyy co-presented the Teletriumph Awards, the national television awards of Ukraine, alongside Masha Efrosynina. Teletriumph 2016 was held at Freedom Hall and was not televised. He also had to leave the stage to accept his own award that night. However, the television channel that Kvartal 95 had been associated with, Inter, and their parent company Inter Media Group, boycotted the event and did not participate in the nomination process due to disputes within the Ukrainian television industry and the awards organisers. Zelenskyy reportedly delivered a biting punchline about the boycott. The president of Inter Media Group then circulated a press release in response.

Zelenskyy worked mostly in Russian-language productions. The romantic comedy Me. You. He. She, released in Ukraine in December 2018, was his first acting role in the Ukrainian language. The first version of the script was written in Ukrainian but was translated into Russian for the Lithuanian actress Agnė Grudytė. Later, the movie was dubbed into Ukrainian.

=== Inter general producer (2010–2012) ===
Zelenskyy was a member of the board and the general producer of the TV channel Inter from 2010 to 2012, where he created 30 new formats. Later in 2018, Zelenskyy said that then-President Yanukovych had offered him US$100 million for political control of Kvartal 95's programmes after he became general producer of Inter, but Zelenskyy refused.

== 2019 presidential election ==
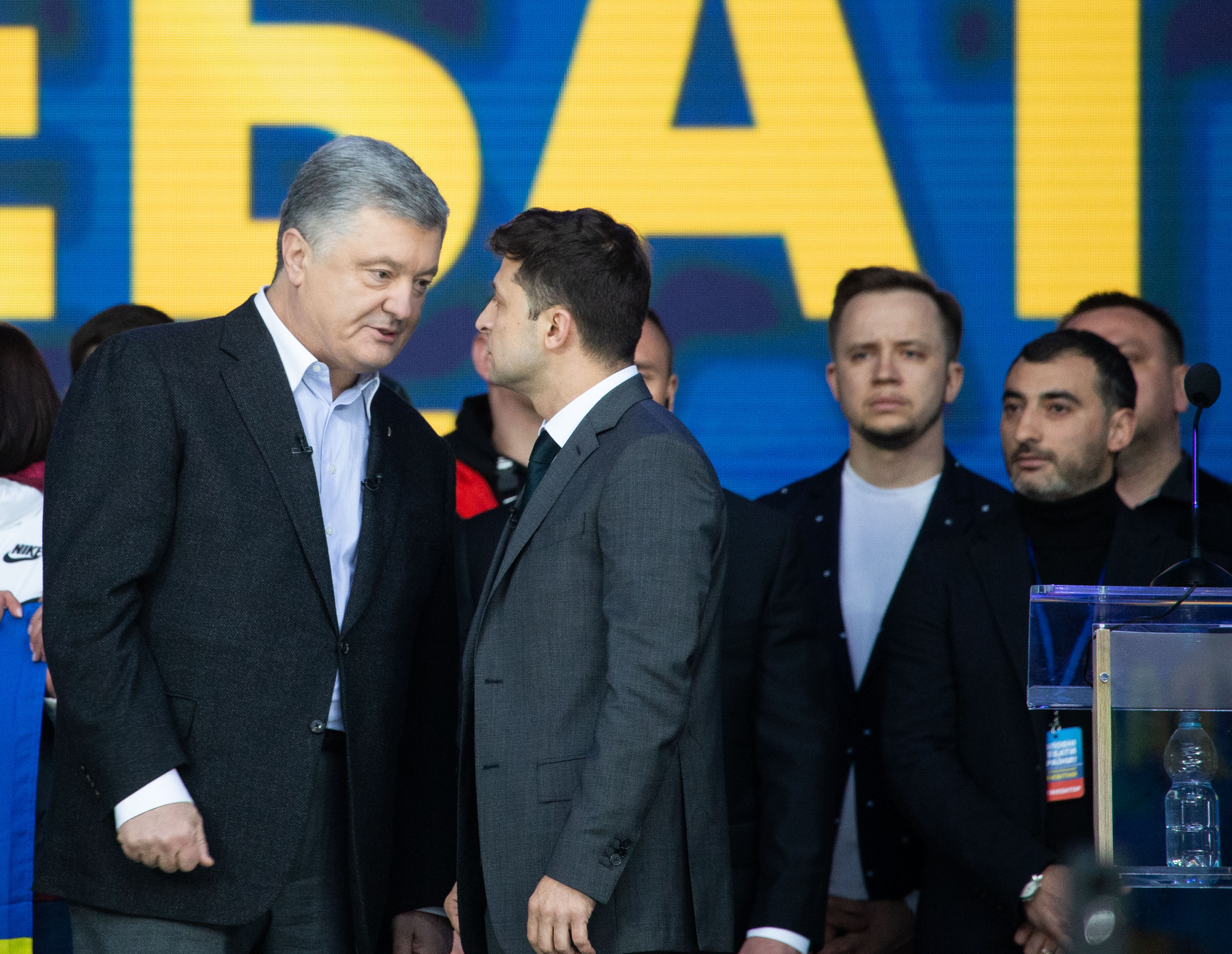
Zelenskyy and then-president of Ukraine Petro Poroshenko during a presidential debate in April 2019

In March 2018, members of Zelenskyy's production company Kvartal 95 registered a new political party called Servant of the People – the same name as the television programme in which Zelenskyy had played the President of Ukraine for the previous three years. Although Zelenskyy denied any immediate plans to enter politics and said he had registered the party name only to prevent it being appropriated by others, there was widespread speculation that he was planning to run. As early as October 2018, three months before his campaign announcement and six months before the presidential election, he was already a frontrunner in opinion polls. After months of ambiguous statements, on 31 December, less than four months from the election, Zelenskyy announced his candidacy for president of Ukraine on the New Year's Eve evening show on the TV channel 1+1. His announcement aired during the traditional New Year's Eve address of incumbent president Petro Poroshenko on the same channel, which was only played after Zelenskyy's announcement; Zelenskyy said this was unintentional and attributed it to a technical glitch.

Zelenskyy's presidential campaign against Poroshenko was almost entirely virtual. He did not release a detailed policy platform and his engagement with mainstream media was minimal; (Note: From 21 January until 18 April 2019 Zelenskyy did not give interviews.) he instead reached out to the electorate via social media channels and YouTube clips. In place of traditional campaign rallies, he conducted stand-up comedy routines across Ukraine with his production company Kvartal 95. On 16 April 2019, a few days before the second round of the election, 20 Ukrainian news outlets called on Zelenskyy to "stop avoiding journalists". Zelenskyy stated that he was not hiding from journalists but that he did not want to go to talk shows where "people of the old power" were "just doing PR" and that he did not have time to satisfy all interview requests.

The third season of Servant of the People started and ended during the 2019 campaign.

Zelenskyy styled himself as an anti-establishment, anti-corruption figure, and said he wished to restore trust in politicians, "to bring professional, decent people to power" and to "change the mood and timbre of the political establishment". Atlantic Council member Anders Aslund said Zelenskyy was not a populist; however, other scholars have analysed Zelenskyy's politics in the framework of populism. For instance, political scientist Volodymyr Kulyk described Zelenskyy as practising "inclusionary" populism that claims to defend "the people" against "the elite" while defining "the people" in a way inclusive of all ethnic, linguistic, religious, and other groups. Scholar Kostiantyn Yanchenko described Zelenskyy's campaign as characterised by "populist hyperreality" constructed by the Servant of the People series and Zelenskyy's other comedy shows, and argued along with fellow scholar Mattia Zulianello that Zelenskyy and his party were examples of "valence populism" focused on "non-positional topics, such as anti-corruption appeals, political transparency and moral integrity", rather than "economic and socio-cultural issues".

Before the elections, Zelenskyy presented a team that included former finance minister Oleksandr Danylyuk and others. During the campaign, concerns were raised over his links to the oligarch Ihor Kolomoyskyi, a billionaire businessman who had gained control of the 1+1 Media Group in 2010. The group operates eight Ukrainian TV channels and broadcast Servant of the People from 2015 to 2019.

Poroshenko and his supporters argued that Zelenskyy's victory would benefit Russia. On 19 April 2019 at Olimpiyskiy National Sports Complex presidential debates were held in the form of a show. In his introductory speech, Zelenskyy acknowledged that in 2014 he voted for Poroshenko, but "I was mistaken. We were mistaken. We voted for one Poroshenko, but received another. The first appears when there are video cameras, the other Petro sends Medvedchuk privietiki (greetings) to Moscow." Although Zelenskyy initially said he would serve only a single term, he walked back this promise in May 2021, saying he had not yet made up his mind.

Zelenskyy stated that as president he would develop the economy and attract investment to Ukraine through "a restart of the judicial system" and restoring confidence in the state. He also proposed a tax amnesty and a 5-per-cent flat tax for big business which could be increased "in dialogue with them and if everyone agrees". According to Zelenskyy, if people would notice that his new government "works honestly from the first day", they would start paying their taxes.

Zelenskyy achieved a plurality of the electorate (30%) in the first round of elections on 31 March 2019. In the second round, on 21 April 2019, he received 73 percent of the vote to Poroshenko's 25 percent in the biggest landslide victory in Ukrainian presidential elections and was elected President of Ukraine. Polish president Andrzej Duda was one of the first European leaders to congratulate Zelenskyy. French president Emmanuel Macron received Zelenskyy at the Élysée Palace in Paris on 12 April 2019. On 22 April, U.S. president Donald Trump congratulated Zelenskyy on his victory over the telephone. European Commission president Jean Claude Juncker and European Council president Donald Tusk also issued a joint letter of congratulations and stated that the European Union (EU) will work to speed up the implementation of the remainder of the EU–Ukraine Association Agreement, including the Deep and Comprehensive Free Trade Area.

== Presidency (2019–present) ==
- Presidency of Volodymyr Zelenskyy; 20 May 2019 – present
- President: Volodymyr Zelenskyy
- Prime Minister: Volodymyr Hroysman Oleksiy Honcharuk Denys Shmyhal Yulia Svyrydenko Serhii Koretskyi
- Cabinet: Groysman Government Honcharuk Government Shmyhal Government Svyrydenko Government Koretskyi Government
- Party: Servant of the People
- Election: 2019
- Seat: Presidential Office Building Bankova 11, Kyiv

Presidential styles of Volodymyr Zelenskyy
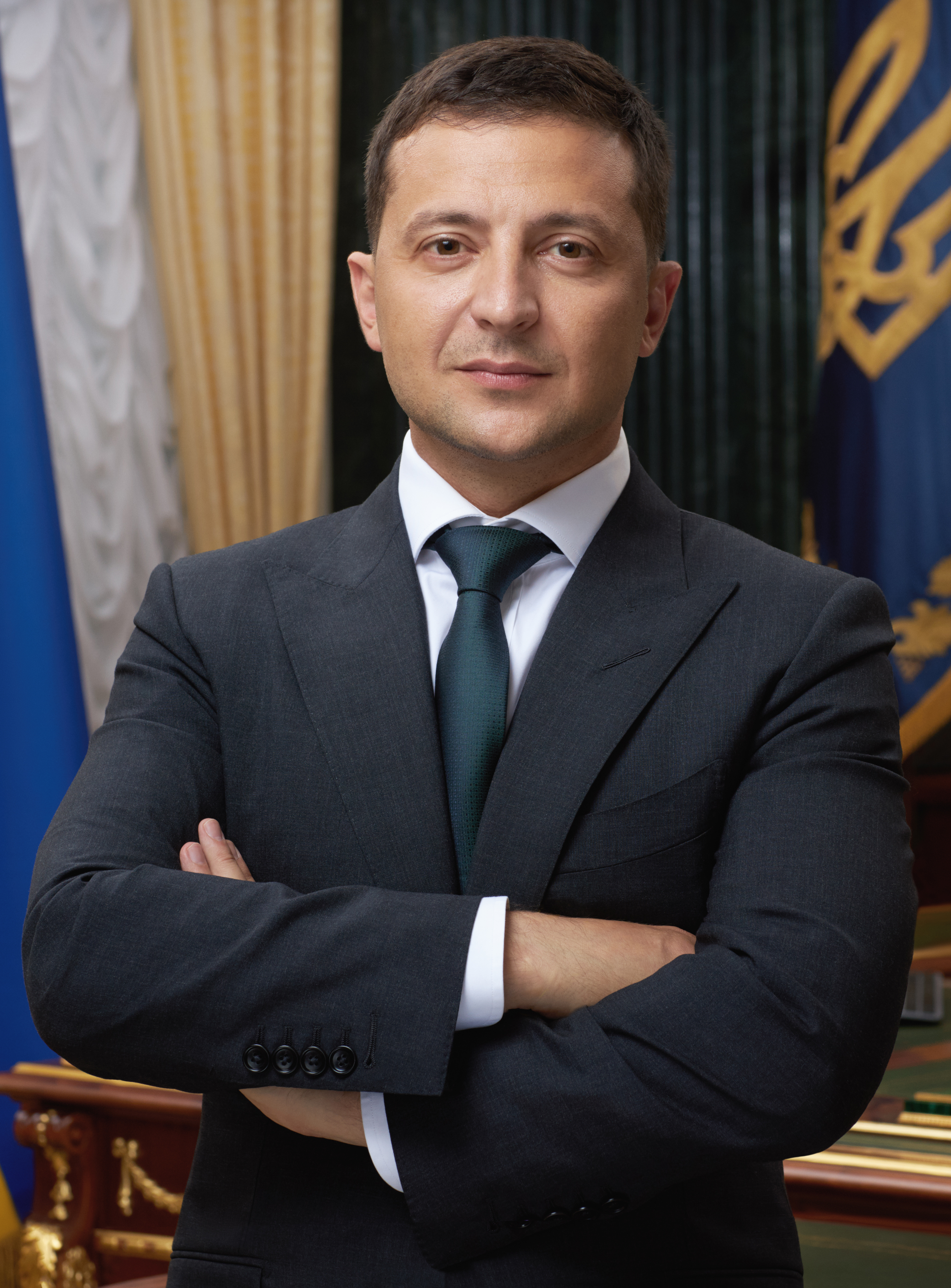
- Official portrait, 2019
- Reference style: Його Високоповажність, Президент України. "His Excellency, the President of Ukraine"
- Spoken style: Президент України. "President of Ukraine"
- Alternative style: Пане Президенте. "Mr President"

=== Before the 2022 Russian invasion ===
==== Inauguration ====
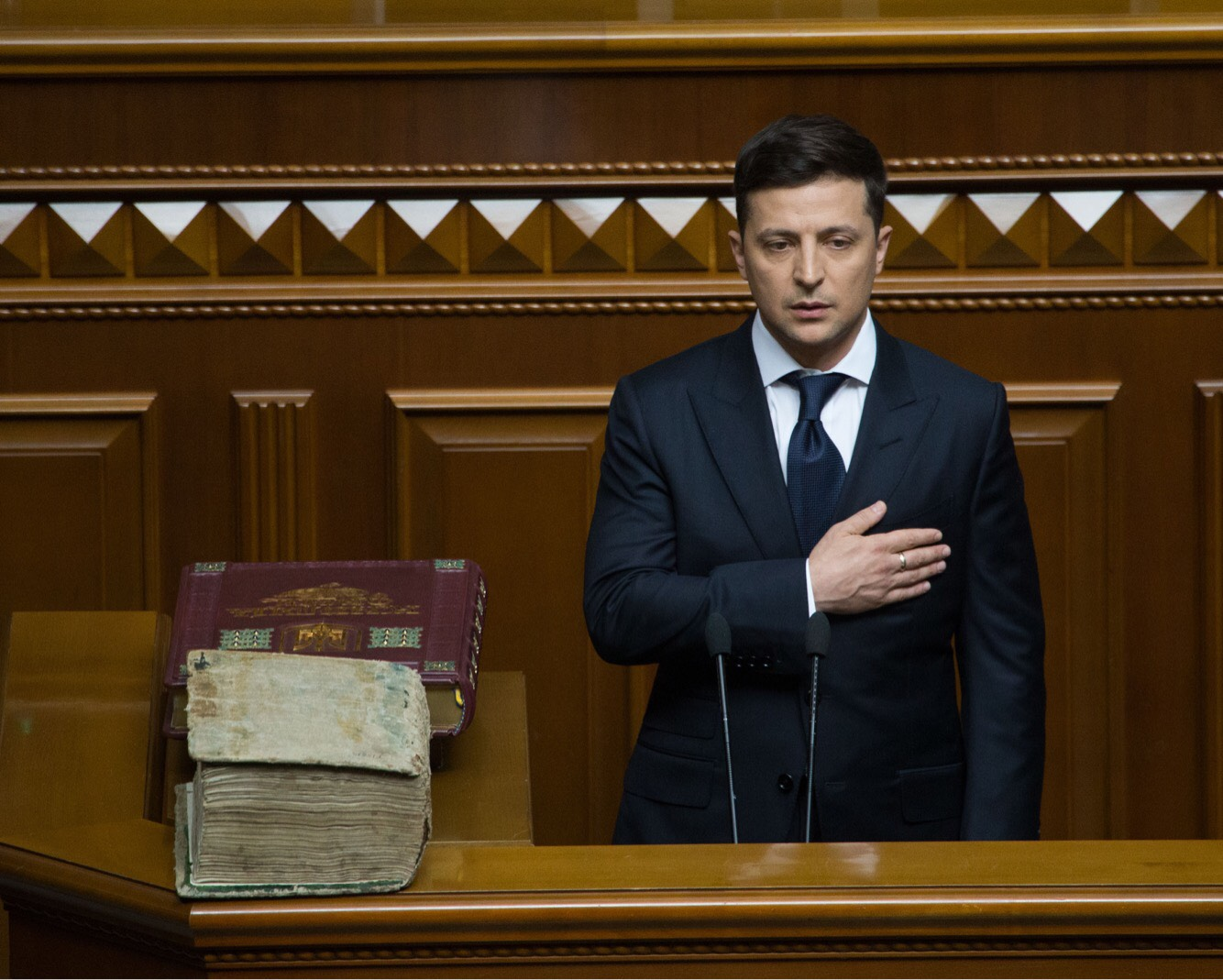
Zelenskyy during his inauguration

Zelenskyy was inaugurated on 20 May 2019. Various foreign officials attended the ceremony in Ukraine's parliament (Verkhovna Rada), including Salome Zourabichvili (Georgia), Kersti Kaljulaid (Estonia), Raimonds Vējonis (Latvia), Dalia Grybauskaitė (Lithuania), János Áder (Hungary), Maroš Šefčovič (EU), and Rick Perry (United States). Zelenskyy is the first Jewish president of Ukraine; with Volodymyr Groysman as prime minister, Ukraine became the first country other than Israel to simultaneously have a Jewish head of state and head of government.

In his inaugural address, Zelenskyy dissolved the Ukrainian parliament and called for early parliamentary elections (which had originally been scheduled for October of that year). One of the parliamentary coalition members, the People's Front, opposed the move and withdrew from the ruling coalition shortly before Zelenskyy's inauguration.

==== Early presidency ====
On 28 May 2019, Zelenskyy restored the Ukrainian citizenship of Mikheil Saakashvili.

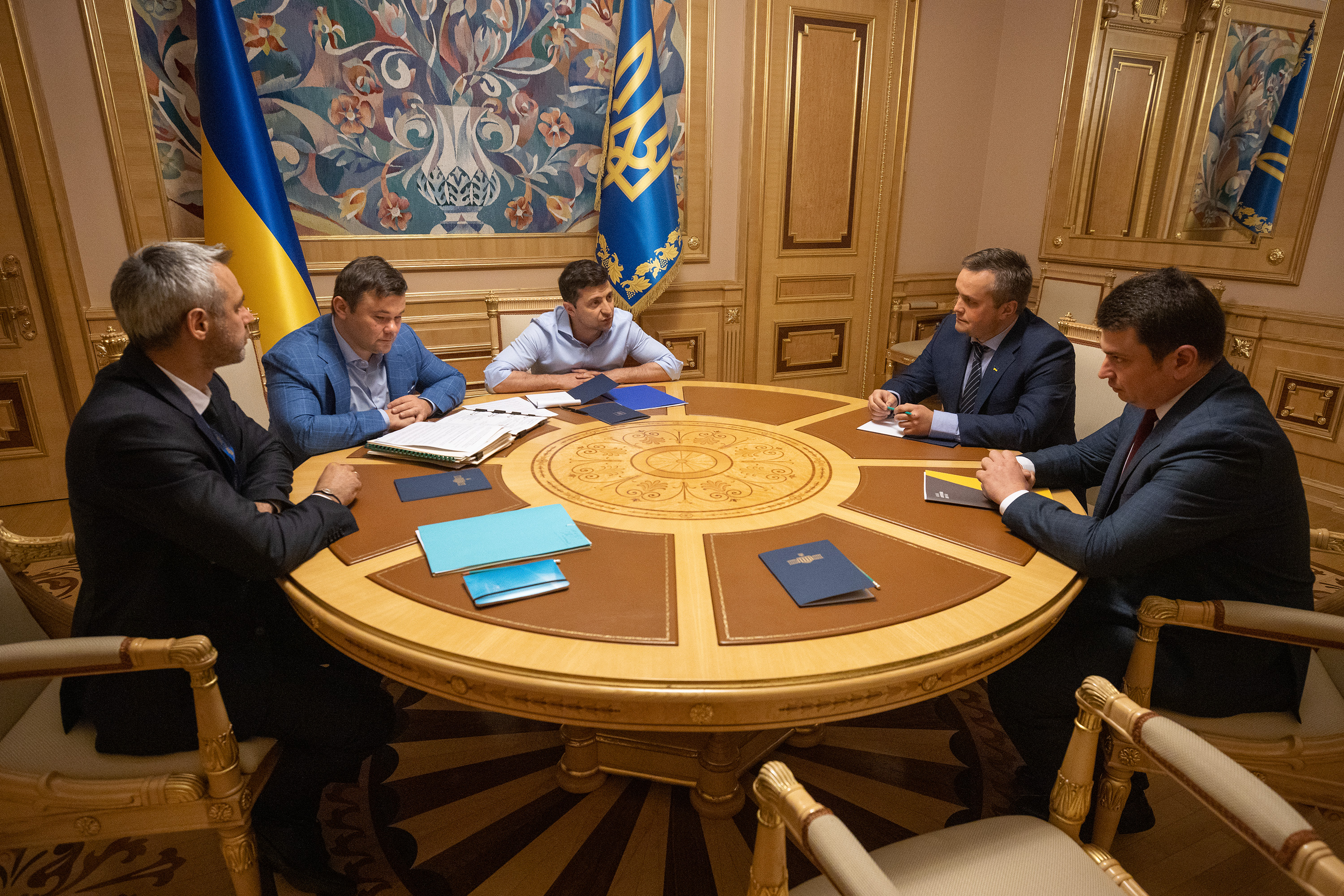
Zelenskyy at a meeting with the Director of the National Anti-Corruption Bureau of Ukraine (NABU), Artem Sytnyk, and the Head of the Specialized Anti-Corruption Prosecutor's Office (SAPO) Nazar Kholodnytskyi, May 2019

Zelenskyy's first major proposal to change the electoral system from a plurality voting system to proportional representation with closed party lists was strongly rejected by the Ukrainian parliament, who believed that closed lists would lead to more corruption in government. Zelenskyy had earlier called for the introduction of open list election ballots, such as during his inauguration speech, but his proposal would have held the 2019 Ukrainian parliamentary election with closed lists based on the reasoning that the 60-day term to the snap election did not "leave any chances for the introduction of this system."

In addition, on 6 June, lawmakers refused to include Zelenskyy's key initiative on reintroducing criminal liability for illegal enrichment in the parliament's agenda, and instead included a similar bill proposed by a group of deputies. In June 2019 it was announced that the president's third major initiative, which seeks to remove immunity from lawmakers, diplomats and judges, would be submitted after the July 2019 Ukrainian parliamentary election. This initiative was completed on 3 September, when the new parliament passed a bill stripping lawmakers of legal immunity, delivering Zelenskyy a legislative victory by fulfilling one of his key campaign promises.

On 8 July, Zelenskyy ordered the cancellation of the annual Kyiv Independence Day Parade on Maidan Nezalezhnosti, citing costs. Despite this, Zelenskyy highlighted that the day would "honor heroes" on Independence Day, however, the "format will be new." He also proposed to spend the money that would have been used to finance the parade on veterans.

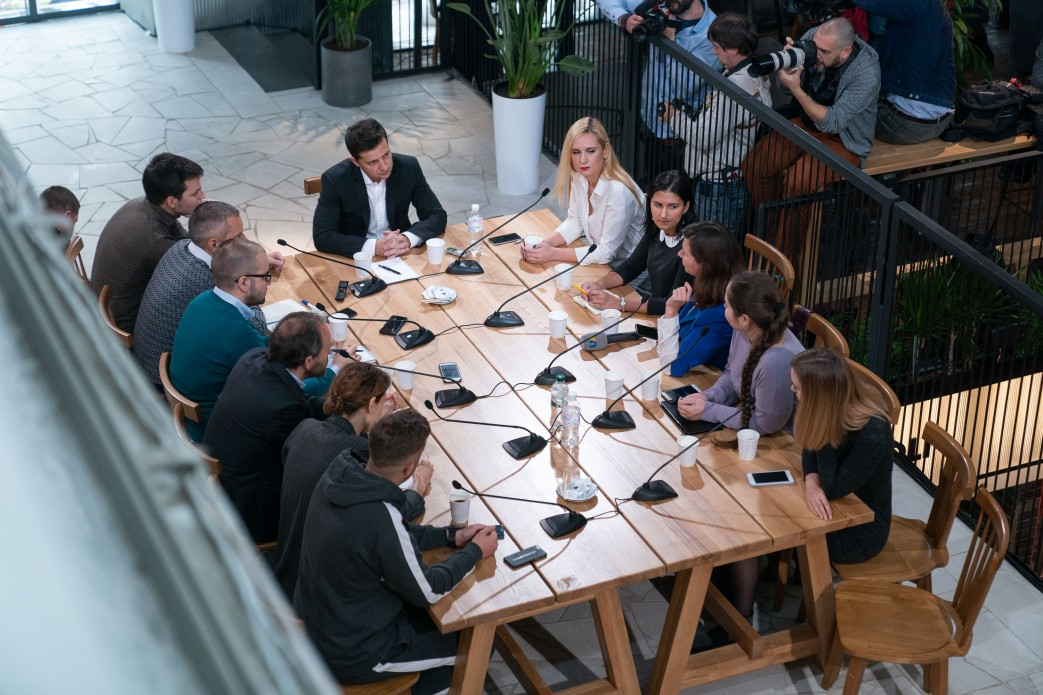
Zelenskyy at the 14-hour press conference in a Kyiv food court, 10 October 2019

On 10 October 2019, Zelenskyy held a 14-hour press conference in a Kyiv food court, where he took questions from about 300 Ukrainian and foreign journalists. Journalists attended in groups of seven to ten which switched every hour, with short breaks of up to ten minutes between groups. Zelenskyy answered questions about the first impeachment of Donald Trump; issues related to the Russo-Ukrainian war, such as Crimea, the Steinmeier formula, troop disengagement in Donbas, prisoner exchanges and the Normandy Format; his relationship with oligarch Ihor Kolomoyskyi; and other questions. The length of the press conference was announced to be a world record until the record was broken by Maldives president Mohamed Muizzu in May 2025.

In 2020, Zelenskyy's party proposed reforms to Ukraine's media laws with the intent to increase competition and loosen the dominance of Ukrainian oligarchs on television and radio broadcasters. Critics said it risked increasing media censorship in Ukraine because its clause of criminal responsibility for the distribution of disinformation could be abused.

In January 2020, Zelenskyy took a trip to Oman that was not published on his official schedule, appearing to combine a personal holiday with government business. His office said Zelenskyy paid for the entire trip himself. Nevertheless, he was criticised for a lack of transparency and critics pointed out he had once criticised his predecessor Poroshenko for taking an undisclosed vacation in the Maldives.

In his 4 March 2020 address to the Rada, Zelenskyy recommitted to reforms domestic and financial, and remarked that he "cannot always become a psychologist for people, a crisis manager for someone, a collector who requires honestly earned money, and a nanny of the ministry in charge."

By September 2020, Zelenskyy's approval ratings had fallen to less than 32 percent.

In January 2021, parliament passed a bill updating and reforming Ukraine's referendum laws, which Ukraine's Constitutional Court had declared unconstitutional in 2018. Fixing the referendum law had been one of Zelenskyy's campaign promises.

On 24 March 2021, Zelenskyy signed Decree 117/2021 approving the "strategy for de-occupation and reintegration of the temporarily occupied territory of the Autonomous Republic of Crimea and the city of Sevastopol."

In June 2021, Zelenskyy submitted to the Verkhovna Rada a bill creating a public registry of Ukraine's oligarchs, banning them from participating in privatisations of state-owned companies and forbidding them from contributing financially to politicians. Opposition party leaders supported Zelenskyy's goal of reducing oligarchs' influence on politics in Ukraine but were critical of his approach, saying the public register would be both dangerous, as it concentrated power in the president; and ineffective, since oligarchs were merely a "symbol" of more deeply-rooted corruption. The bill was passed into law in September 2021. Critics of Zelenskyy's administration have claimed that, in taking power away from the Ukrainian oligarchs, he has sought to centralise authority and strengthen his position.

By October 2021, Zelenskyy's approval rating had fallen further to 24.7%, but was still above or on par with most of his predecessors' at the same point in their presidencies. That month, the Pandora Papers revealed that Zelenskyy, his chief aide, and the head of the Security Service of Ukraine Ivan Bakanov operated a network of offshore companies in the British Virgin Islands, Cyprus, and Belize. These companies included some that owned expensive London property. Around the time of his 2019 election, Zelenskyy handed his shares in a key offshore company over to Serhiy Shefir, but the two men appear to have arranged for Zelenskyy's family to continue receiving the money from these companies. Zelenskyy's election campaign had centred on pledges to clean up the government of Ukraine. Responding to the controversy, Zelenskyy said that the offshore companies had been set up to protect Kvartal 95 Studio from political pressure under the Yanukovych administration, and said this had been common practice during Yanukovych's presidency, especially in the media industry. The same month, the National Agency on Corruption Prevention announced that they had found no signs of conflicts of interest, illicit enrichment, or unjustified assets after investigating Zelenskyy's businesses, and that Zelenskyy had provided letters stating that payments had not been made through the relevant offshore companies to his wife Olena Zelenska in 2019 or 2020.

==== Cabinets and administration ====
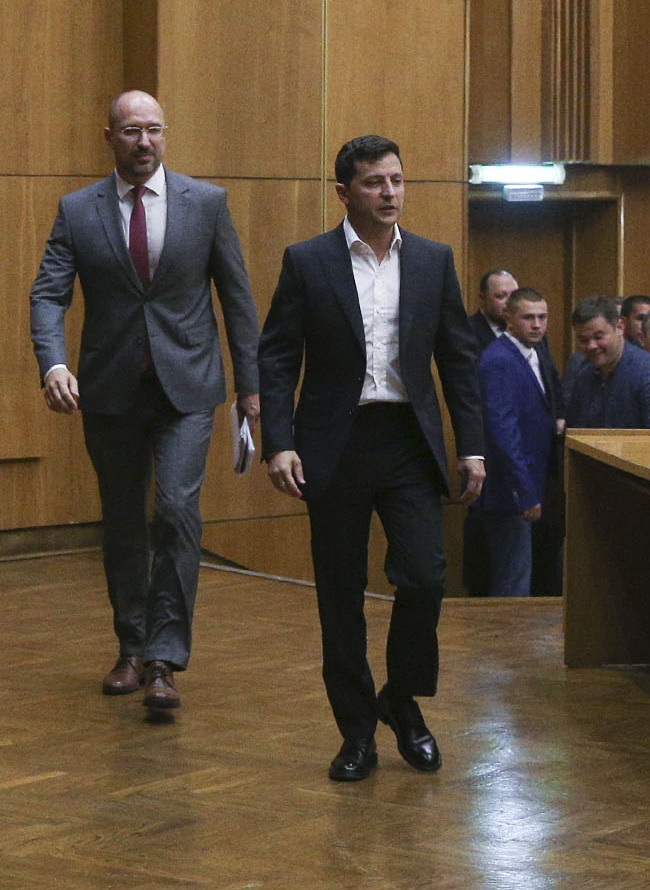
Zelenskyy and Shmyhal in 2019

Zelenskyy appointed Andriy Bohdan as head of the Presidential Administration of Ukraine. Before this, Bohdan had been the lawyer of Ukrainian oligarch Ihor Kolomoyskyi. Under the rules of lustration in Ukraine, introduced in 2014 following Euromaidan, Bohdan is not entitled to hold any state office until 2024 (because of his government post during the Second Azarov Government). Bohdan, however, contended that because heading the presidential administration is not considered civil service work, lustration did not apply to him. A number of the members of the Presidential Administration Zelenskyy appointed were former colleagues from his former production company, Kvartal 95, including Ivan Bakanov, who became deputy head of the Ukrainian Secret Service (SBU). Former deputy foreign minister Olena Zerkal declined an appointment as deputy head of the presidential administration, but did agree to serve as the Ukrainian representative of the international courts concerning Russia. Zelenskyy's requests to replace the foreign minister, defence minister, chief prosecutor and head of Ukraine's security service were rejected by parliament. Zelenskyy also dismissed and replaced 20 of the governors of Ukraine's 24 oblasts.

In the 21 July 2019 parliamentary election, Zelenskyy's political party, Servant of the People, won the first single-party majority in modern Ukrainian history in parliament, with 43 percent of the party-list vote. His party gained 254 of the 424 seats.

Following the elections, Zelenskyy nominated Oleksiy Honcharuk as prime minister, who was quickly confirmed by parliament. Parliament also confirmed Andrii Zahorodniuk as defence minister, Vadym Prystaiko as foreign minister and Bakanov as head of the SBU. Arsen Avakov, a controversial figure dogged by longstanding corruption allegations, was kept on as interior minister, with Honcharuk arguing that the relatively inexperienced government needed experienced administrators and that Avakov had been "'drawn red lines' that cannot be crossed."

Zelenskyy dismissed Bohdan as head of his presidential administration on 11 February 2020 and appointed Andriy Yermak as his successor the same day.

In March 2020, Honchurak resigned as prime minister following the leak of an audio recording in which he appeared to belittle Zelenskyy's economic management. Honchurak was replaced as prime minister Denys Shmyhal. Honchurak's hasty departure caused disquiet both in Ukraine and abroad, with many economists and political observers warning it would bring instability.

==== Attempts to end the Donbas conflict ====
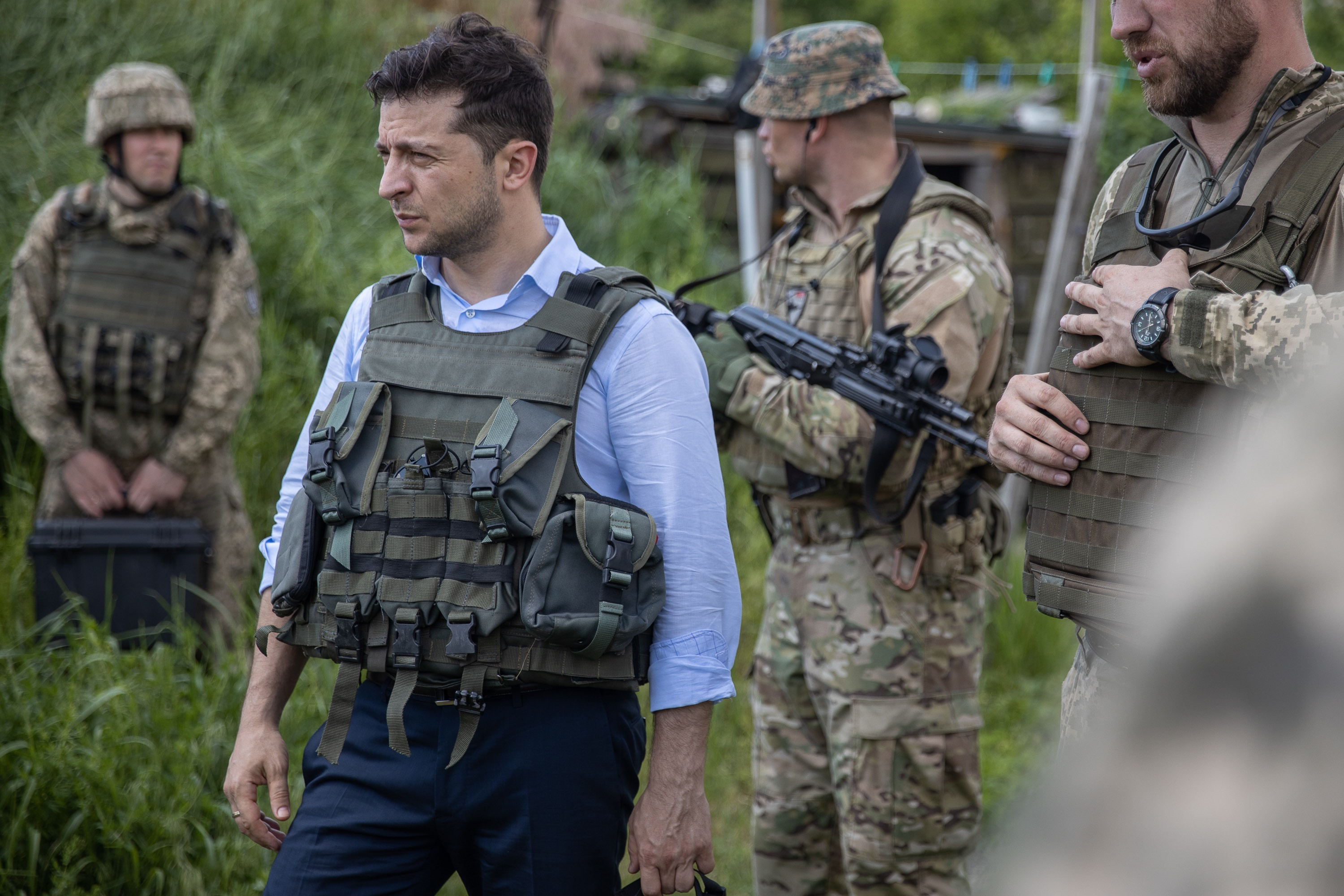
Zelenskyy visiting the frontline in the Donbas, May 2019

One of Zelenskyy's main campaign pledges had been to end the War in Donbas in eastern Ukraine, part of the Russo-Ukrainian war. The conflict had begun in 2014, when Russia occupied and annexed Crimea, then supported separatist paramilitaries who started a war in the eastern Donbas region, seized territory and declared themselves independent states. Russia covertly supported the separatists with its own troops, tanks and artillery, preventing Ukraine from fully retaking the territory. The International Criminal Court (ICC) judged that the war was both a national and international armed conflict involving Russia, and the European Court of Human Rights judged that Russia controlled the separatists from 2014 onward.

On 3 June 2019, Zelenskyy appointed former president Leonid Kuchma as Ukraine's representative in the Tripartite Contact Group for a settlement in the conflict. On 11 July 2019, Zelenskyy held his first telephone conversation with Russian president Vladimir Putin, during which he urged Putin to enter into talks mediated by EU. The two leaders also discussed the exchange of prisoners held by both sides.

A public opinion poll, held in separatist-controlled Donbas in March 2019 by the Centre for East European and International Studies, found that 55% of those polled wanted reintegration with Ukraine.

On 1 October 2019, Zelenskyy agreed to try to end the Donbas conflict by implementing parts of the Minsk agreements through the "Steinmeier formula". Russia demanded this before any continuation of the "Normandy Format" peace talks. The plan foresaw holding elections, under Ukrainian law, in the territory held by Russian-backed separatists. The elections would be observed by the Organization for Security and Cooperation in Europe (OSCE). Should the OSCE deem the elections free and fair, the separatist territories would be re-integrated into Ukraine and given permanent "special status", meaning they would be largely self-governing.

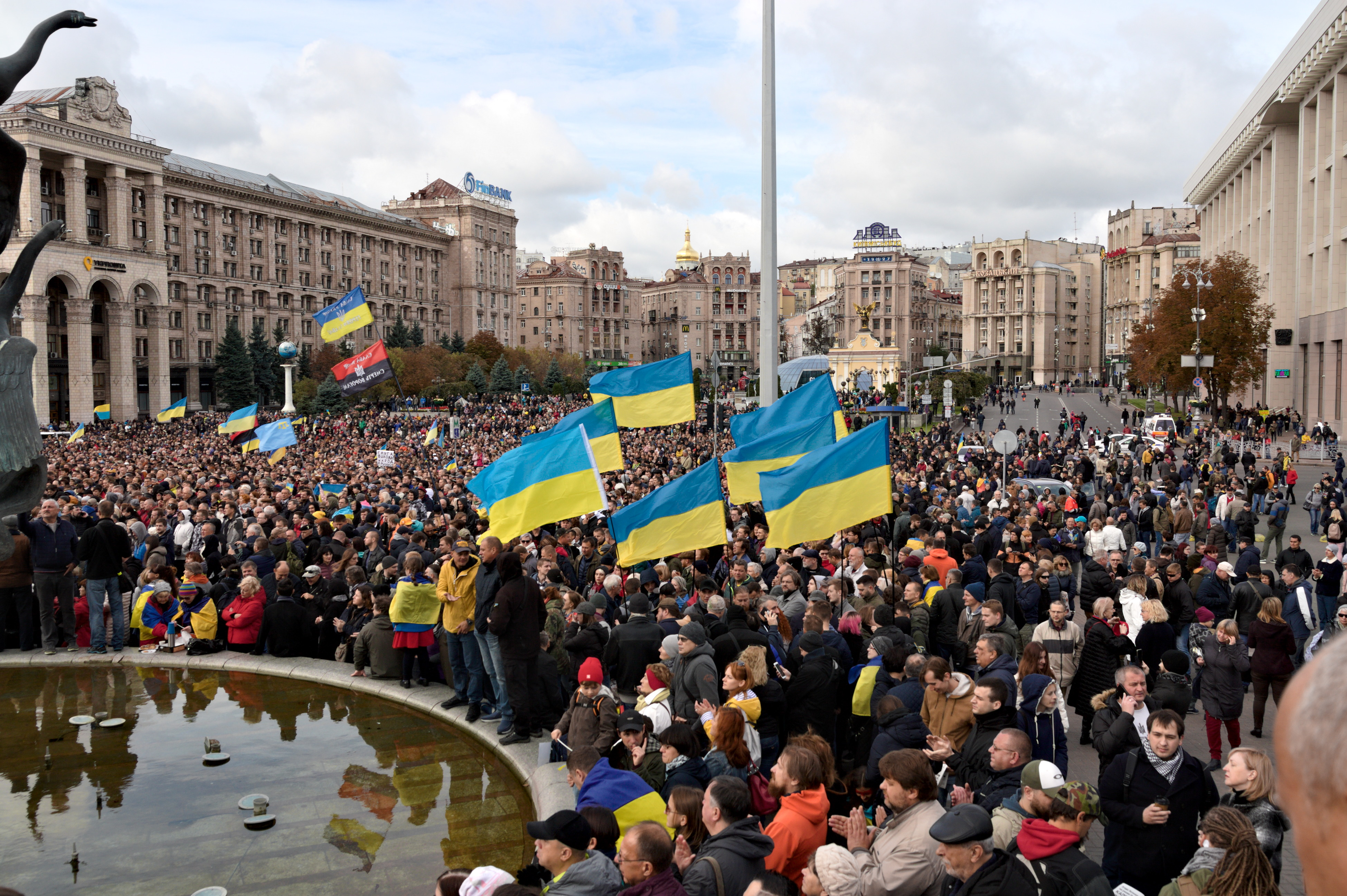
A "No to capitulation!" protest in Kyiv, October 2019

Zelenskyy faced strong opposition over the plan. Opponents argued that it would legalise the occupation of the Donbas and leave it as "a deadly Trojan horse under Russian control". Critics argued that elections held in Donbas were unlikely to be free and fair, that the separatists had long driven most pro-Ukrainian residents out of the region to ensure a pro-Russia majority, and that it would be impossible to ensure Russia kept its end of the agreement. It was noted that the wording of the Minsk agreements is unclear on whether Russian troops would have to leave and if their proxy forces would have to disarm before elections.

There were protests against Zelenskyy and his government for agreeing to the plan, dubbed "No to capitulation!". About 10,000 protested in Kyiv, including Ukrainian far-right nationalists. He was also criticised by Ukrainian opposition politicians. Former president Petro Poroshenko dismissed it as "Putin's formula", saying it would make the Donbas "an anchor blocking Ukraine's aspirations towards European and Euro-Atlantic aspirations". Several Ukrainian nationalist militias opposed the plan, including Azov fighters in the Luhansk region of Donbas. Zelenskyy met personally with some of these groups and tried to convince them to accept the plan. Andriy Biletsky, leader of the far-right National Corps and first commander of Azov, accused Zelenskyy of being disrespectful to army veterans and of acting on behalf of the Kremlin by leaving Ukrainians vulnerable to Russian aggression.

The leaders of the Donbas separatists, Denis Pushilin and Leonid Pasechnik, stated: "It will be we who decide the language we speak, what kind of economy we have, how our judicial system will be formed, how our people's militia will be defending our citizens, and how we will be integrated into Russia. ... Kyiv authorities will not get any sort of control over the border with Russia".

Zelenskyy responded that he would not allow the elections to be held "at gunpoint". He said there must first be a ceasefire, a return of prisoners, withdrawal of Russian forces, and Ukrainian guards on the border. He also suggested that Ukrainians forced to flee the Donbas could be allowed to vote. Zelenskyy said that a ceasefire and Russian withdrawal would be negotiated at the next "Normandy format" meeting.

As part of the plan, Ukrainian and pro-Russian forces agreed to pull back from three parts of the frontline: at Stanytsia Luhanska, Zolote and Petrivske.

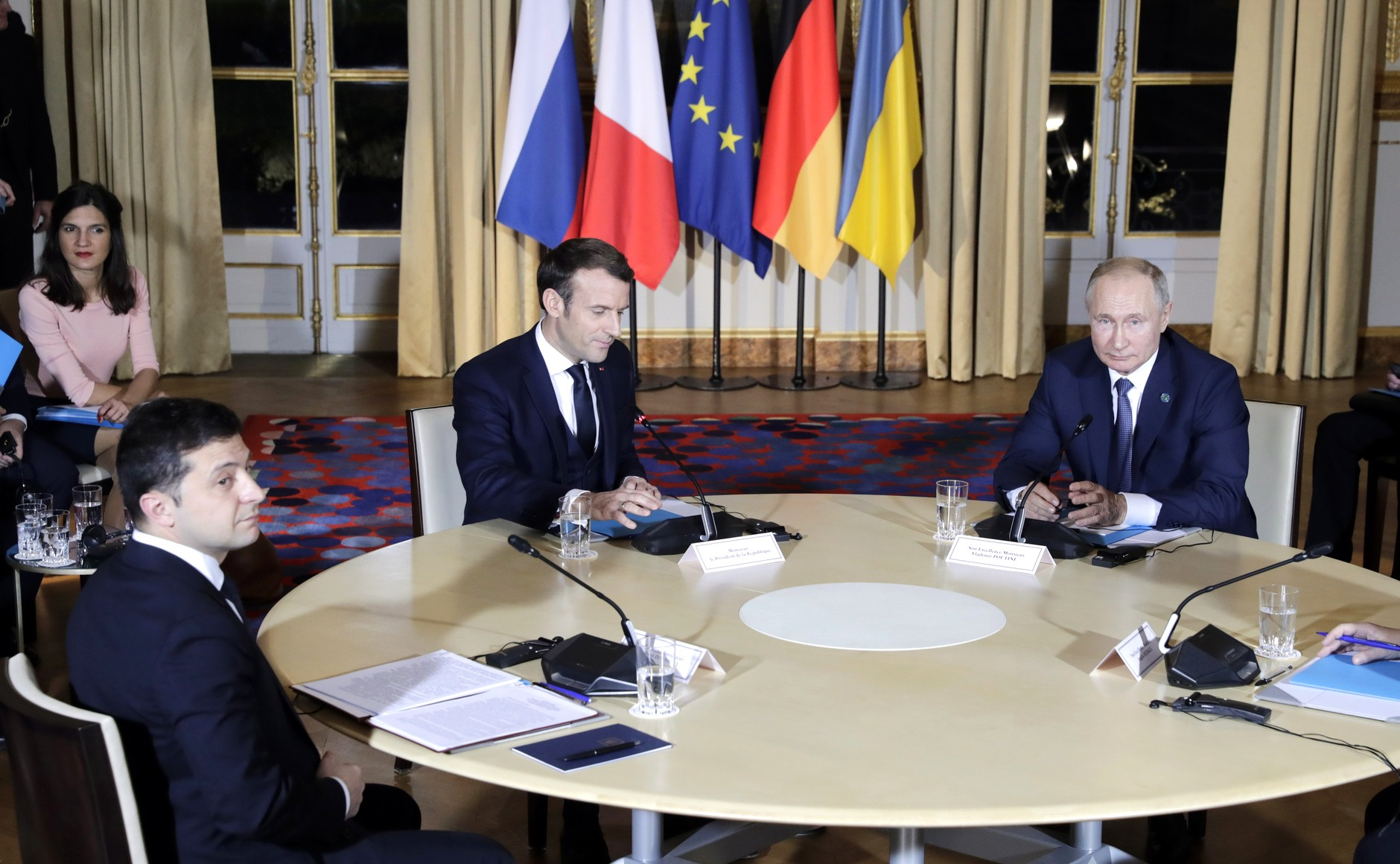
Zelenskyy with Macron and Putin during a Normandy Format meeting, December 2019

On 9 December 2019, Russia and Ukraine resumed talks in Paris, mediated by Emmanuel Macron of France and Angela Merkel of Germany under the so-called "Normandy format", which had been abandoned in 2016. It was Zelenskyy's first face-to-face meeting with Vladimir Putin. Zelenskyy set out his conditions for elections in the Donbas:

- A full ceasefire and withdrawal of all armed groups
- Release of all Ukrainian prisoners
- Ukrainian control over the 400km (249-mile) stretch of the Russia-Ukraine border that rebels controlled
- Participation of Ukrainian parties and candidates, not just pro-Russian parties
- The right of all those who fled the conflict to return to vote

Zelenskyy and Putin pledged to work toward holding these elections, but disagreed over the timing and other issues. They agreed that a full ceasefire would begin by the end of the year and all remaining prisoners would be released. They also agreed to pull forces back from three more frontline areas by March 2020. However, Putin insisted that control of the border should only be dealt with after the elections. The Russian side continued to deny that its military was operating in the Donbas, instead calling them "Russian volunteers". Another summit was planned to be held in four months.

The talks failed to end the conflict, as the separatists continued their attacks and Russia continued providing them with weapons, ammunition and other support.

On 27 July 2020, another ceasefire was agreed – the more than twentieth attempt since the war began in 2014. However, the OSCE reported more than 100 ceasefire violations within two days, without indicating which side had committed them. Nevertheless, ceasefire violations halved in 2020 compared to the year before.

The Ukrainian parliament announced that the October 2020 local elections could not be held in the Russian-occupied part of the Donbas, because the Minsk agreements called for them to be held under Ukrainian law. Russian president Putin insisted that elections be held there while Russian and Russian-backed forces still controlled the region and the border.

==== UIA Flight 752 ====
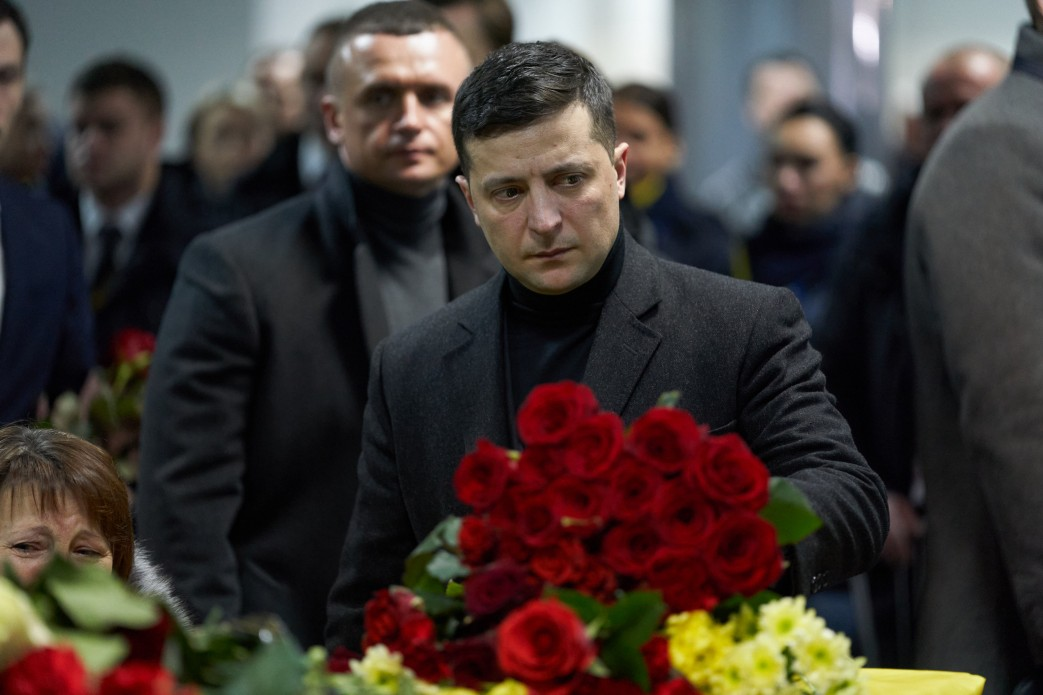
Zelenskyy meeting the coffins of Ukrainians killed in the Iranian shootdown of UIA Flight 752

On 8 January 2020, the Presidential Office announced that Volodymyr Zelenskyy was cutting short his trip to Oman owing to the Ukraine International Airlines Flight 752 plane crash in nearby Iran the same day. Also on the same day, internet news site Obozrevatel.com released information that on 7 January 2020, Ukrainian politician of the Opposition Platform — For Life Medvedchuk – who has exclusive relations with the current president of Russia – may have arrived in Oman. Soon, rumours began that Zelenskyy may have had some additional meetings beside the ones that were announced. On 14 January 2020, Yermak dismissed the rumours as speculations and baseless conspiracy theories, while Medvedchuk stated that the plane was used by his older daughter's family to fly from Oman to Moscow. Later, Yermak contacted the on-line newspaper Ukrainian Truth and gave more details about the visit to Oman and the plane crash in Iran.

On 17 January 2020, the presidential appointee Minister of Foreign Affairs, Prystaiko, was unable to give answers during the "times of questions to the government" in parliament when the people's deputies of Ukraine asked him about the visit's official agenda, the invitation from Oman, officials of the Ministry of Foreign Affairs who were preparing the visit, as well as how the president actually crossed the border while visiting Oman. On 20 January 2020, Prystaiko followed up by giving a briefing to the press in the Office of the president of Ukraine and saying that he would explain everything about the visit when the time came.

==== Early foreign relations ====
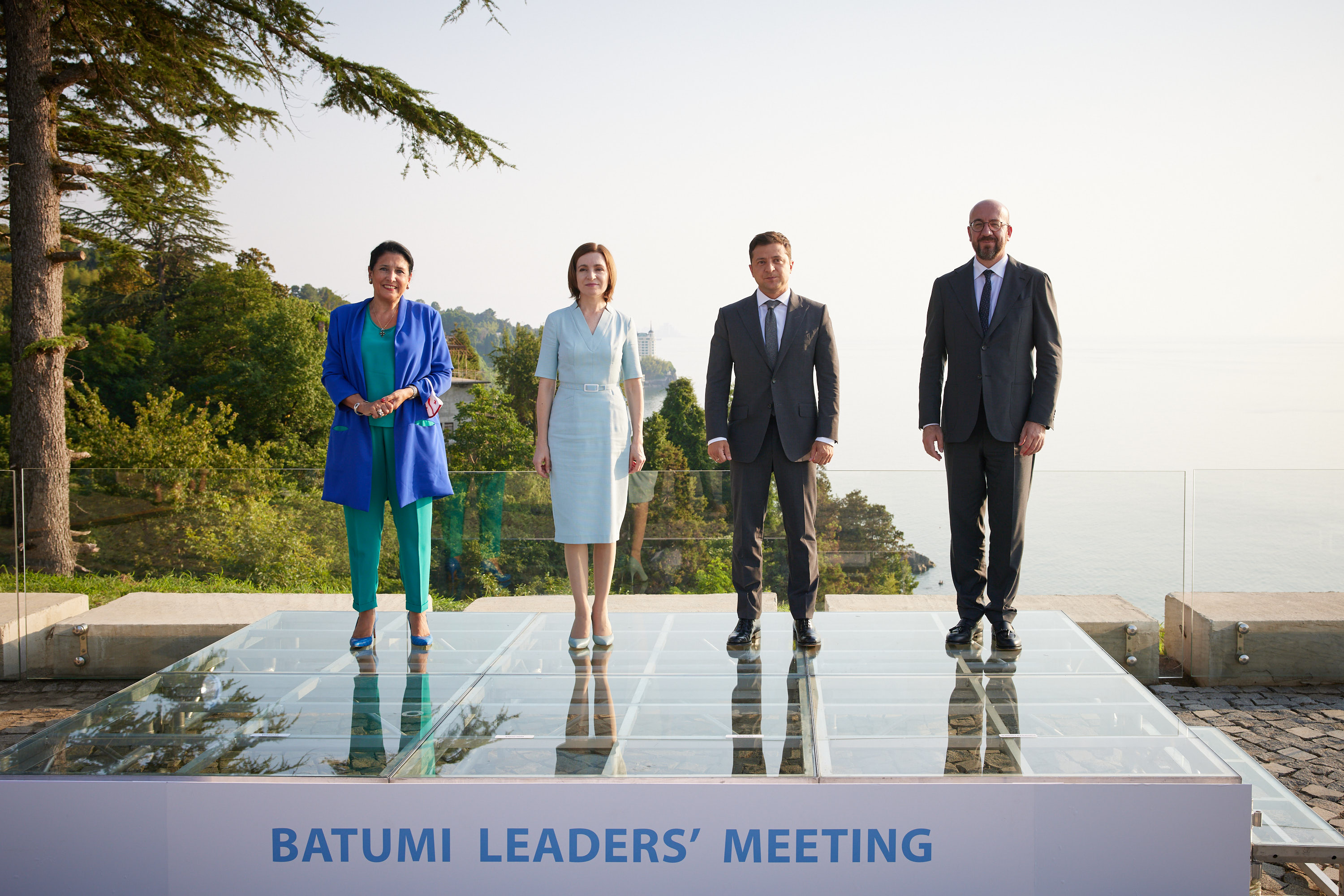
Zelenskyy at the Batumi International Conference with Georgian president Salomé Zourabichvili, Moldovan president Maia Sandu and European Council president Charles Michel, 19 July 2021

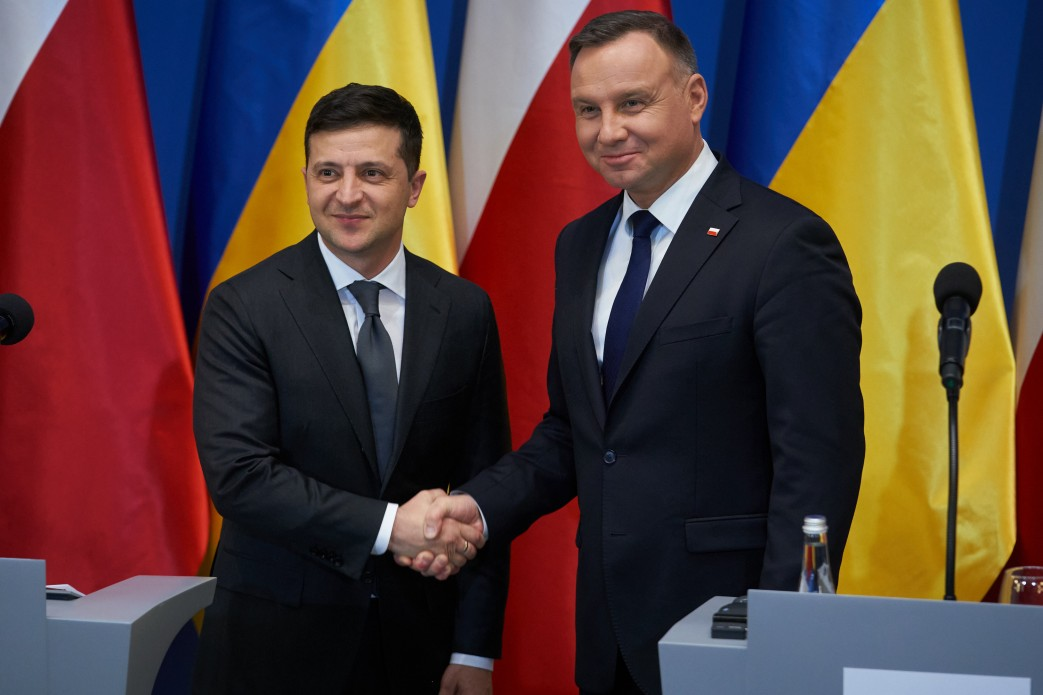
Zelenskyy meets Polish president Andrzej Duda during an official visit to Poland, 26 January 2020

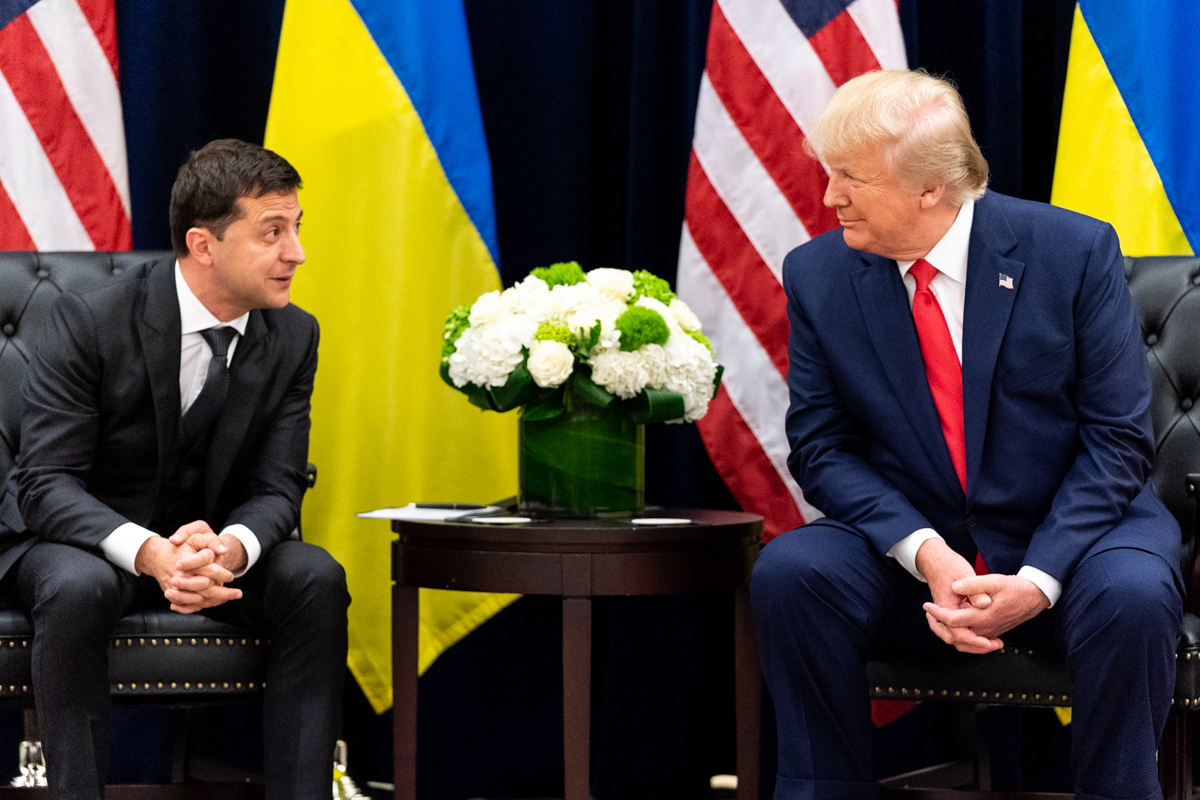
Zelenskyy and US president Donald Trump, September 2019

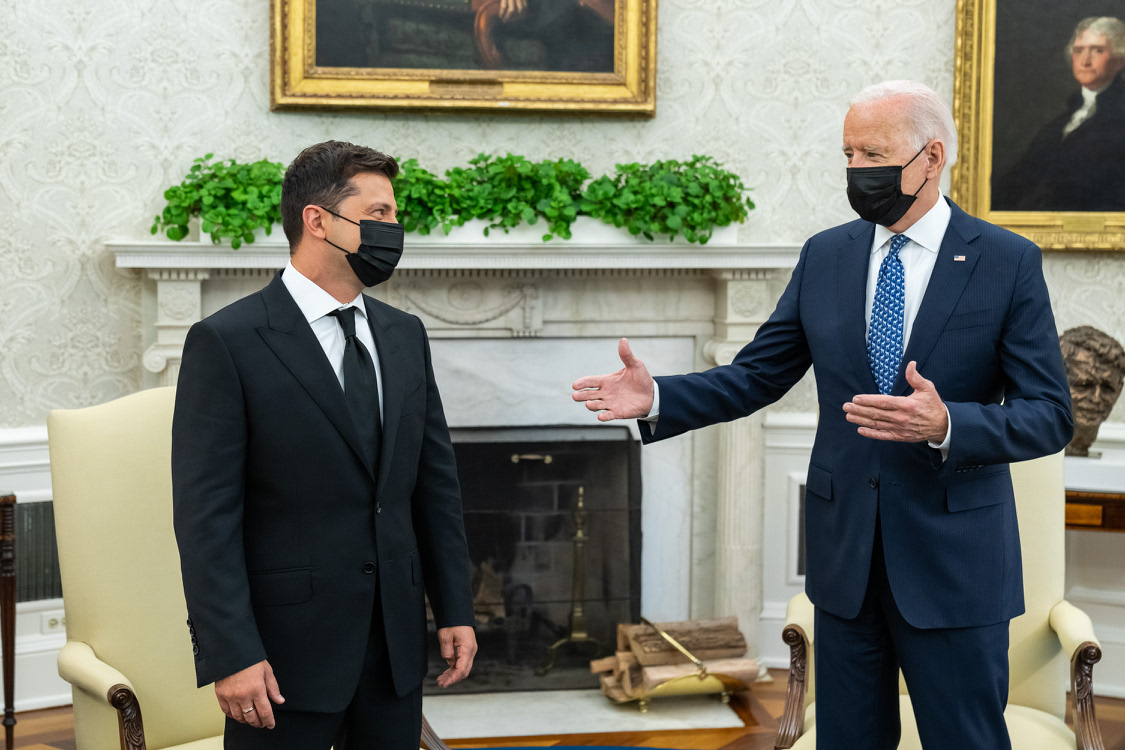
Zelenskyy and US president Joe Biden, September 2021

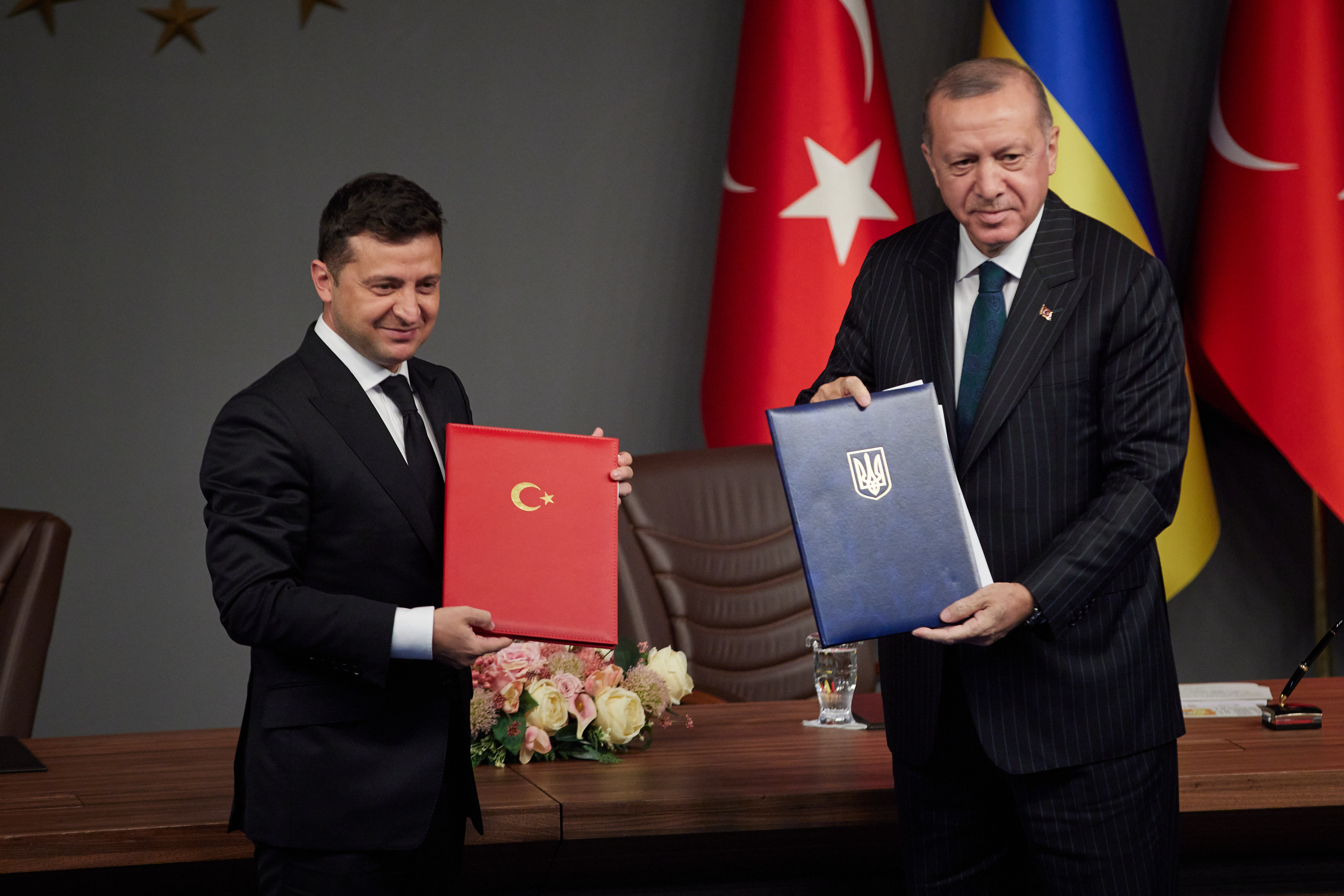
Zelenskyy and Turkish president Recep Tayyip Erdoğan in October 2020

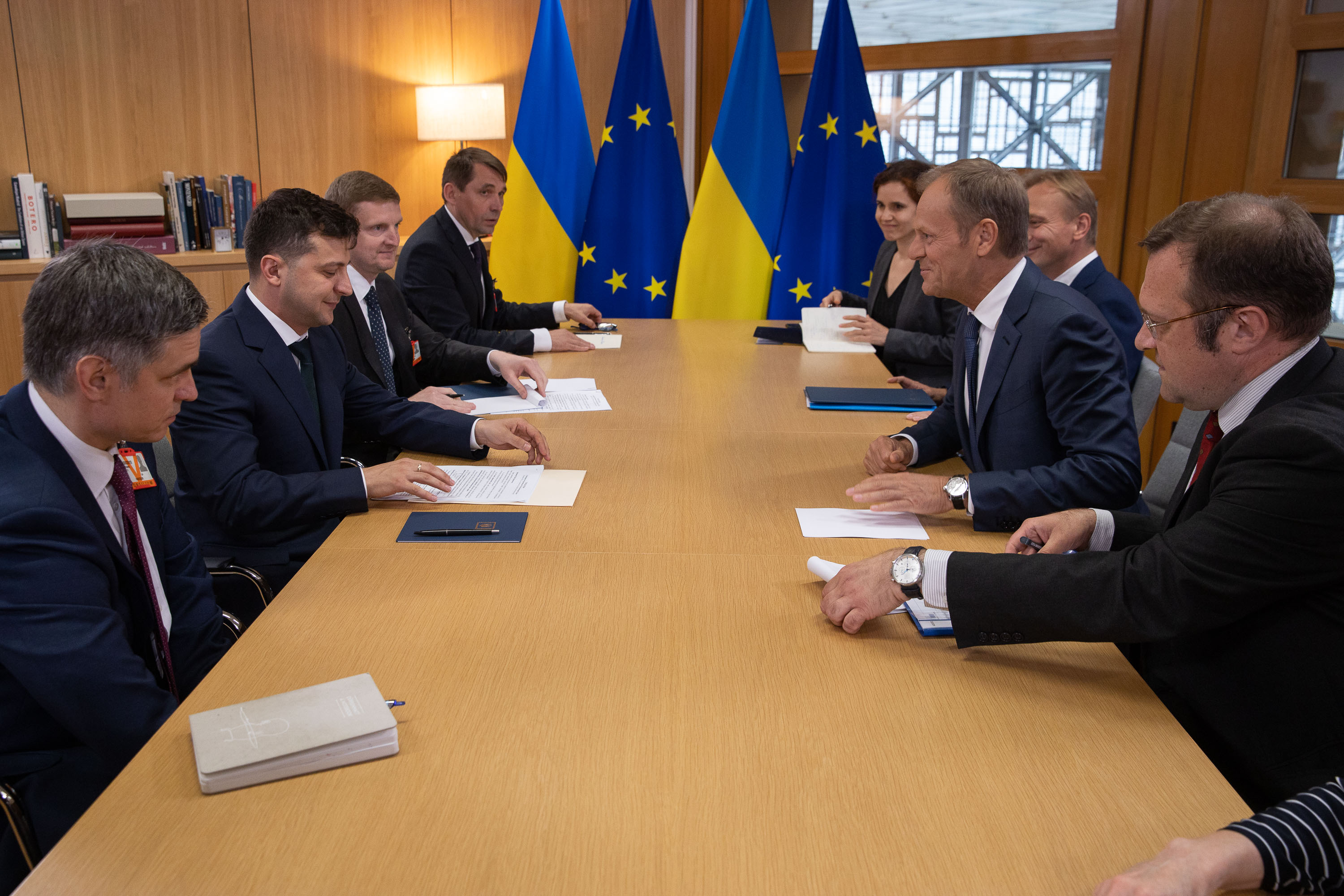
Zelenskyy with President of the European Council, Donald Tusk, 2019

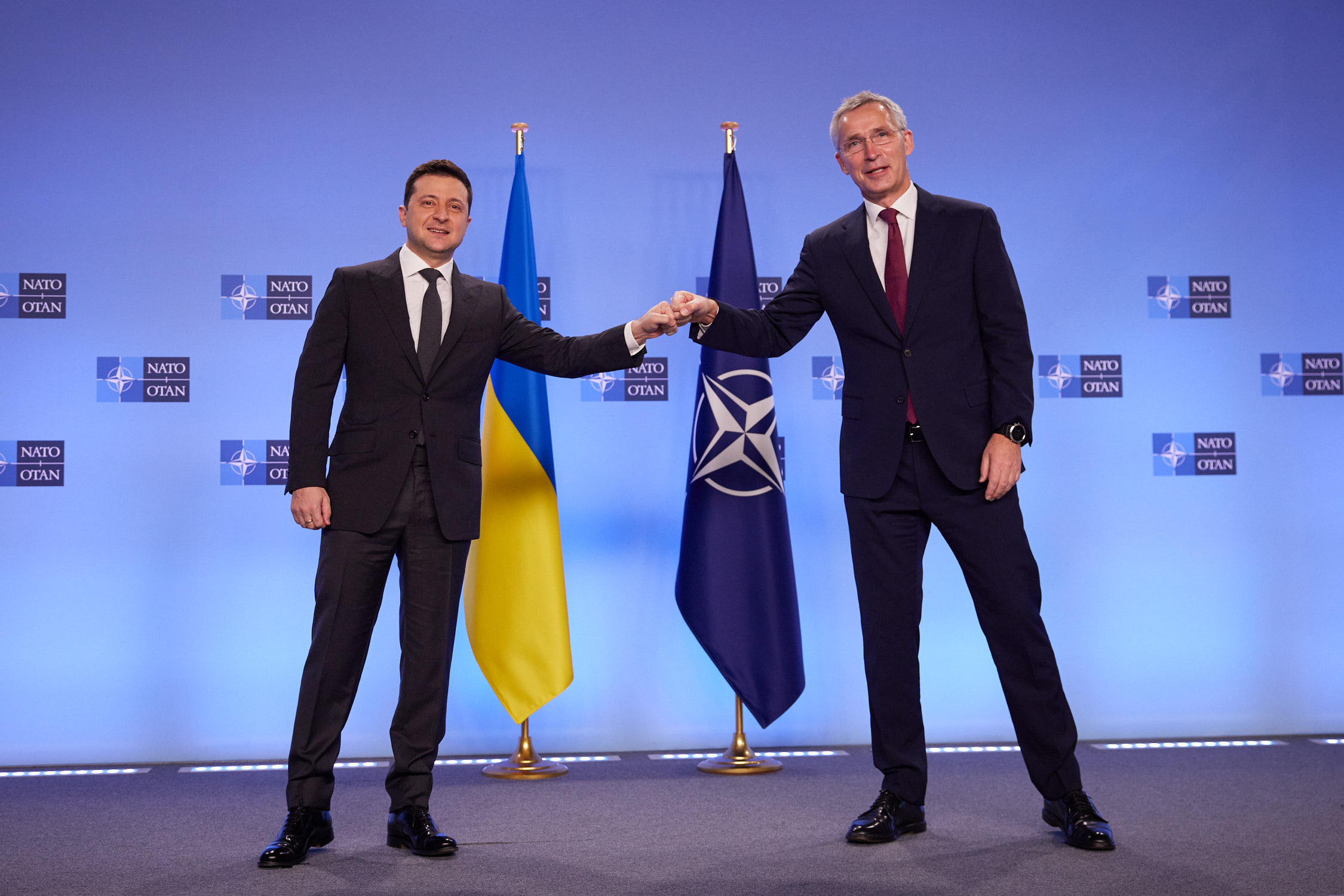
Zelenskyy with NATO Secretary-General Jens Stoltenberg, 2019

Zelenskyy's first official trip abroad as president was to Brussels in June 2019, where he met with EU and NATO officials.

In August 2019, Zelenskyy promised to lift the moratorium on exhuming Polish mass graves in Ukraine after the previous Ukrainian government banned the Polish side from carrying out any exhumations of Polish victims of the Ukrainian Insurgent Army-perpetrated Volhynian massacres, following the removal of a memorial to the Ukrainian Insurgent Army in Hruszowice, southeastern Poland.

In September 2019, it was reported that U.S. president Trump had allegedly blocked payment of a congressionally mandated $400-million military aid package to Ukraine to pressure Zelenskyy during a July phone call between the two presidents to investigate alleged wrongdoing by Joe Biden and his son Hunter Biden, who took a board seat on Ukrainian natural gas company Burisma Holdings. This report was the catalyst for the Trump–Ukraine scandal and the impeachment inquiry against Donald Trump. Zelenskyy has denied that he was pressured by Trump and declared that "he does not want to interfere in a foreign election."

On a trip to the United States in September 2021, Zelenskyy engaged in talks and commitments with U.S. president Joe Biden, Secretary of Defense Lloyd Austin, Secretary of Energy Jennifer Granholm, and Secretary of State Antony Blinken. President Zelenskyy and First Lady Olena Zelenska also took part in the opening of the Ukrainian House in Washington, D.C. On the same trip, he met with Apple CEO Tim Cook and with Ukrainians in senior positions at Silicon Valley tech companies, and spoke at Stanford University. While Zelenskyy was still in the U.S., just after delivering a speech at the United Nations, an assassination attempt was made in Ukraine on Serhiy Shefir, his closest aide. Shefir was unhurt in the attack, although his driver was hospitalised with three bullet wounds.

==== Prelude to the 2022 Russian invasion ====
In April 2021, in response to Russian military build-up at the Ukrainian borders, Zelenskyy spoke to American president Joe Biden and urged NATO members to speed up Ukraine's request for membership.

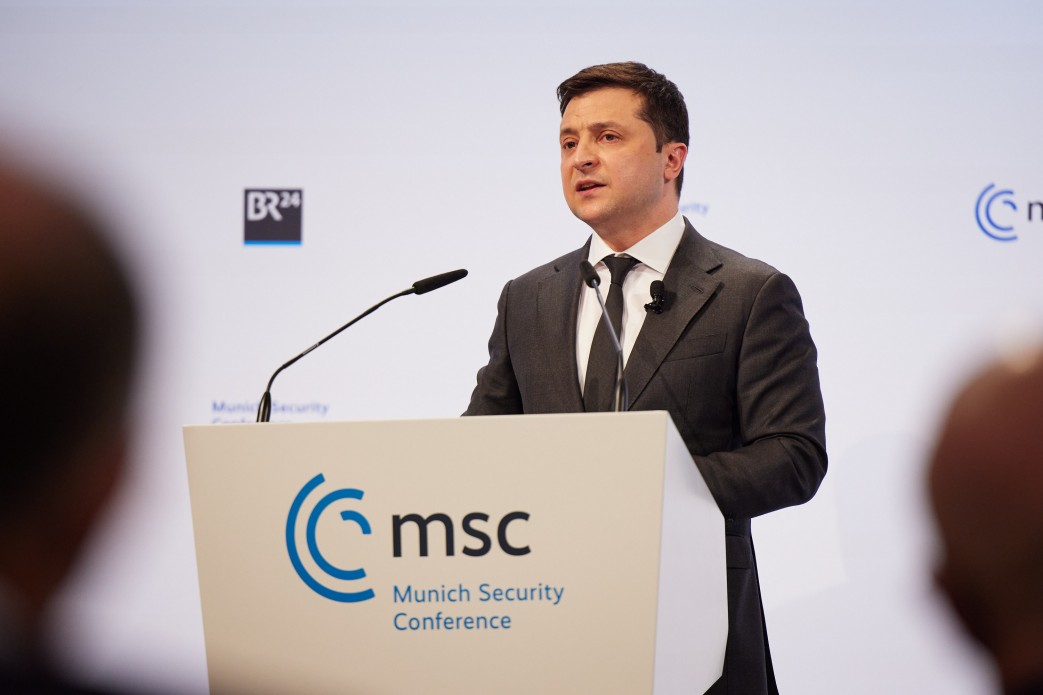
Zelenskyy at the 58th Munich Security Conference in February 2022

On 26 November 2021, Zelenskyy accused Russia and Ukrainian oligarch Rinat Akhmetov of backing a plan to overthrow his government. Russia denied any involvement in a coup plot and Akhmetov said in a statement that "the information made public by Volodymyr Zelenskiy about attempts to draw me into some kind of coup is an absolute lie. I am outraged by the spread of this lie, no matter what the president's motives are." In December 2021, Zelenskyy called for preemptive action against Russia. On 19 January 2022, Zelenskyy said in a video message that the country's citizens should not panic and appealed to the media to be "methods of mass information and not mass hysteria." On 28 January, Zelenskyy called on the West not to create a "panic" in his country over a potential Russian invasion, adding that constant warnings of an "imminent" threat of invasion are putting the economy of Ukraine at risk. Zelenskyy said that "we do not see a bigger escalation" than in early 2021 when Russia's military build-up started. Zelenskyy and U.S. president Joe Biden disagreed on how imminent the threat was.

On 19 February, as worries of a Russian invasion of Ukraine grew, Zelenskyy warned the Munich Security Conference that Western nations should abandon their "appeasement" attitude toward Moscow. "Ukraine has been granted security assurances in exchange for giving up the world's third-largest nuclear arsenal. We don't have any firearms. And there's no security... But we have a right to urge a transformation from an appeasement policy to one that ensures security and peace," he stated.

=== Since the 2022 Russian invasion ===
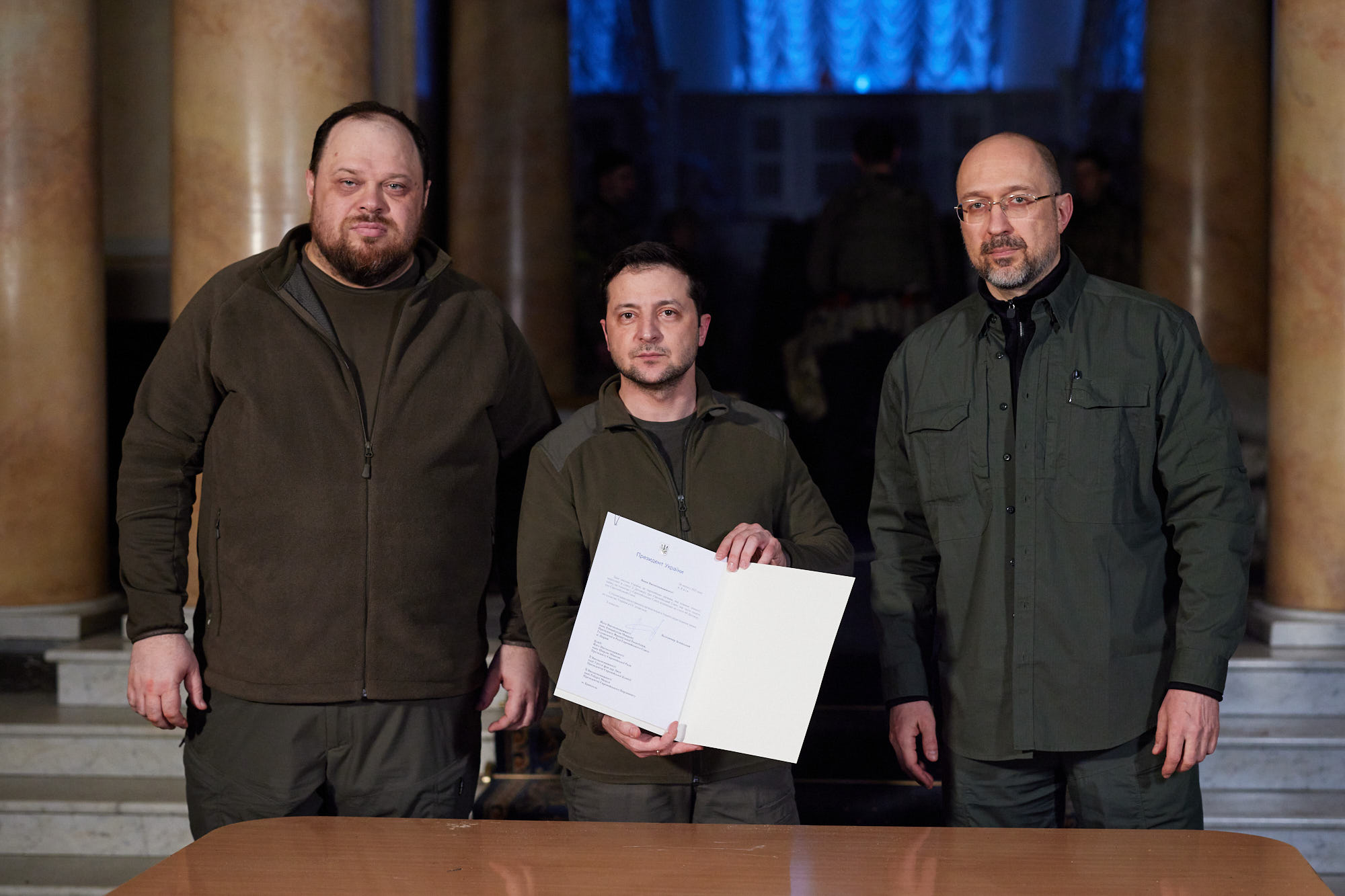
Verkhovna Rada chairman Ruslan Stefanchuk, Ukrainian President Volodymyr Zelenskyy and Ukrainian Prime Minister Denys Shmyhal after signing of the application for membership in the European Union during the war on 28 February 2022

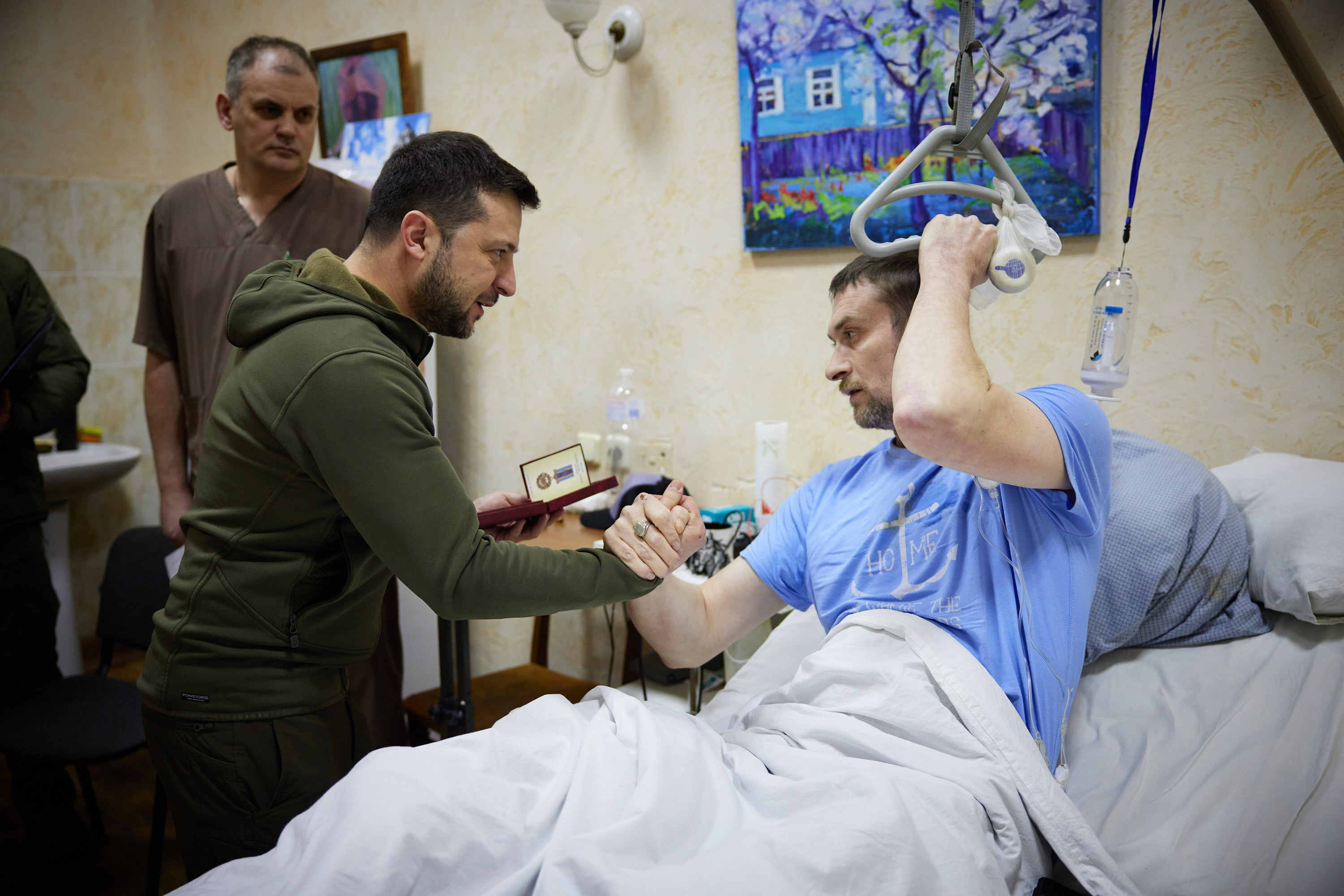
President Volodymyr Zelenskyy visiting a military hospital for soldiers fighting in the Kyiv Oblast, 13 March

==== First phase of the invasion ====
In the early hours of 24 February, shortly before the start of the Russian invasion, Zelenskyy recorded an address to the citizens of both Ukraine and Russia. He disputed claims of the Russian government about the presence of neo-Nazis in the Ukrainian government and stated that he had no intention of attacking the Donbas region while highlighting his connections to the area. In part of the address, he spoke in Russian to the people of Russia, appealing to them to pressure their leadership to prevent war:

Who will suffer the most from this? People. Who does not want this more than anyone? People. Who can prevent this? People.

Are these people present among you? I am sure there are. Public figures, journalists, musicians, actors, athletes, scientists, doctors, bloggers, stand-up comedians, Tik-Tokers and many more. Regular people. Regular, normal people. Men, women, the elderly, children, fathers, and most importantly, mothers. Just like people in Ukraine. Just like the authorities in Ukraine, no matter how much they try to convince you otherwise.

I know that they will not show this appeal of mine on Russian television. But the citizens of Russia must see it. They must know the truth. And the truth is that this needs to stop before it is too late. And if the Russian leadership does not want to sit down at the table with us for the sake of peace, then perhaps, they will sit down at the table with you.

Do Russians want war? I would very much like to answer this question. But the answer depends only on you, the citizens of the Russian Federation.

The speech was widely described as "emotional" and "astonishing."

On the morning of 24 February, Putin announced that Russia was initiating a "special military operation" in the Donbas. Russian missiles struck a number of military targets in Ukraine, and Zelenskyy declared martial law. Zelenskyy also announced that diplomatic relations with Russia were being severed, effective immediately. Later in the day, he announced general mobilisation. On 25 February, Zelenskyy said that despite Russia's claim that it was targeting only military sites, civilian sites were also being hit. In an early morning address that day, Zelenskyy said that his intelligence services had identified him as Russia's top target, but that he would remain in Kyiv and his family would stay in the country. "They want to destroy Ukraine politically by destroying the head of state," he said.

In the early hours of 26 February, during the most significant assault by Russian troops on the capital of Kyiv, the United States government and Turkish president Recep Tayyip Erdoğan urged Zelenskyy to evacuate to a safer location, and both offered assistance for such an effort. Zelenskyy turned down both offers and opted to remain in Kyiv with its defence forces, saying that "the fight is here [in Kyiv]; I need ammunition, not a ride."

More than 90% of Ukrainians supported the actions of Zelenskyy, including more than 90% in western and central Ukraine and more than 80% in Russian-speaking regions in eastern and southern Ukraine. A Pew Research Center poll found that 72% of Americans had confidence in Zelenskyy's handling of international affairs.

Since the start of the invasion, Zelenskyy has reportedly been the target of more than a dozen assassination attempts; three were prevented by tips from Russian FSB employees who opposed the invasion. Two of those attempts were carried out by the Wagner Group, a Russian paramilitary force, and the third by the Kadyrovites, the personal guard of Chechen leader Ramzan Kadyrov. While speaking about Ukrainian civilians who were killed by Russian forces, Zelenskyy said:

We will not forgive. We will not forget. We will punish everyone who committed atrocities in this war... We will find every scum who was shelling our cities, our people, who was shooting the missiles, who was giving orders. You will not have a quiet place on this earth – except for a grave.

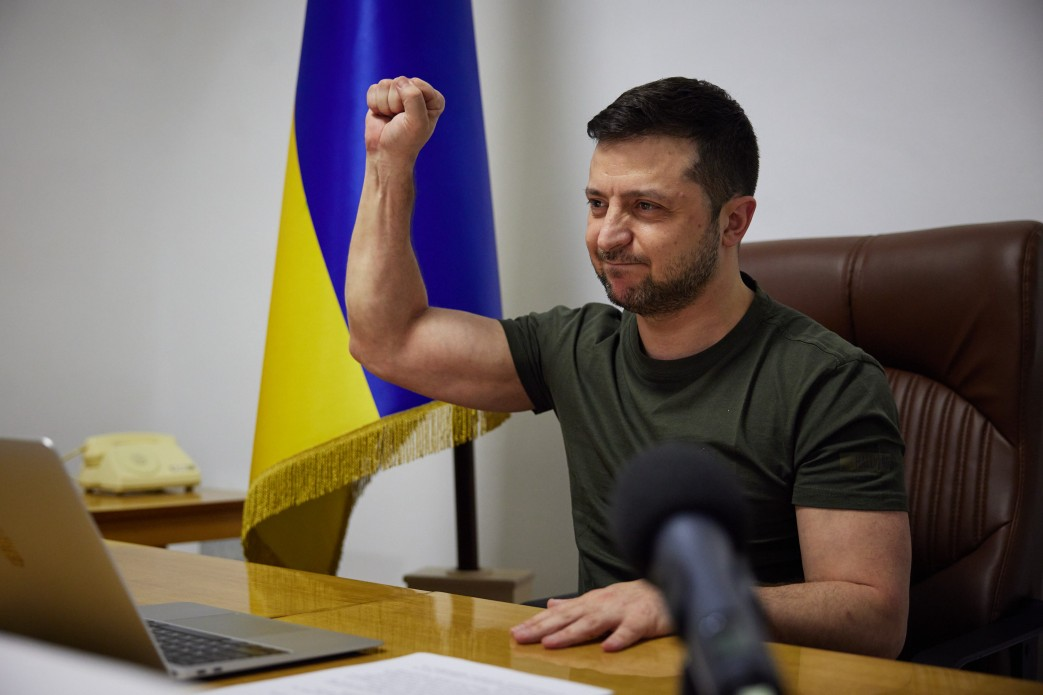
Zelenskyy giving a video address to the United Kingdom's parliament on 8 March 2022

Zelenskyy repeatedly called for direct talks with Putin, saying: "Good Lord, what do you want? Leave our land. If you don't want to leave now, sit down with me at the negotiating table. But not from 30 meters away, like with Macron and Scholz. I don't bite." Zelenskyy said he was "99.9% sure" that Putin thought the Ukrainians would welcome the invading forces with "flowers and smiles."

On 7 March 2022, as a condition for ending the invasion, the Kremlin demanded Ukraine's neutrality; recognition of Crimea, which had been annexed by Russia, as Russian territory; and recognition of the self-proclaimed separatist republics of Donetsk and Luhansk as independent states. On 8 March, Zelenskyy expressed willingness to discuss Putin's demands. Zelenskyy said he was ready for dialogue, but "not for capitulation." He proposed a new collective security agreement for Ukraine with the United States, Turkey, France, Germany as an alternative to the country joining NATO. Zelenskyy's Servant of the People party said that Ukraine would not give up its claims on Crimea, Donetsk and Luhansk. However, Zelenskyy said that Ukraine was considering giving the Russian language protected minority status.

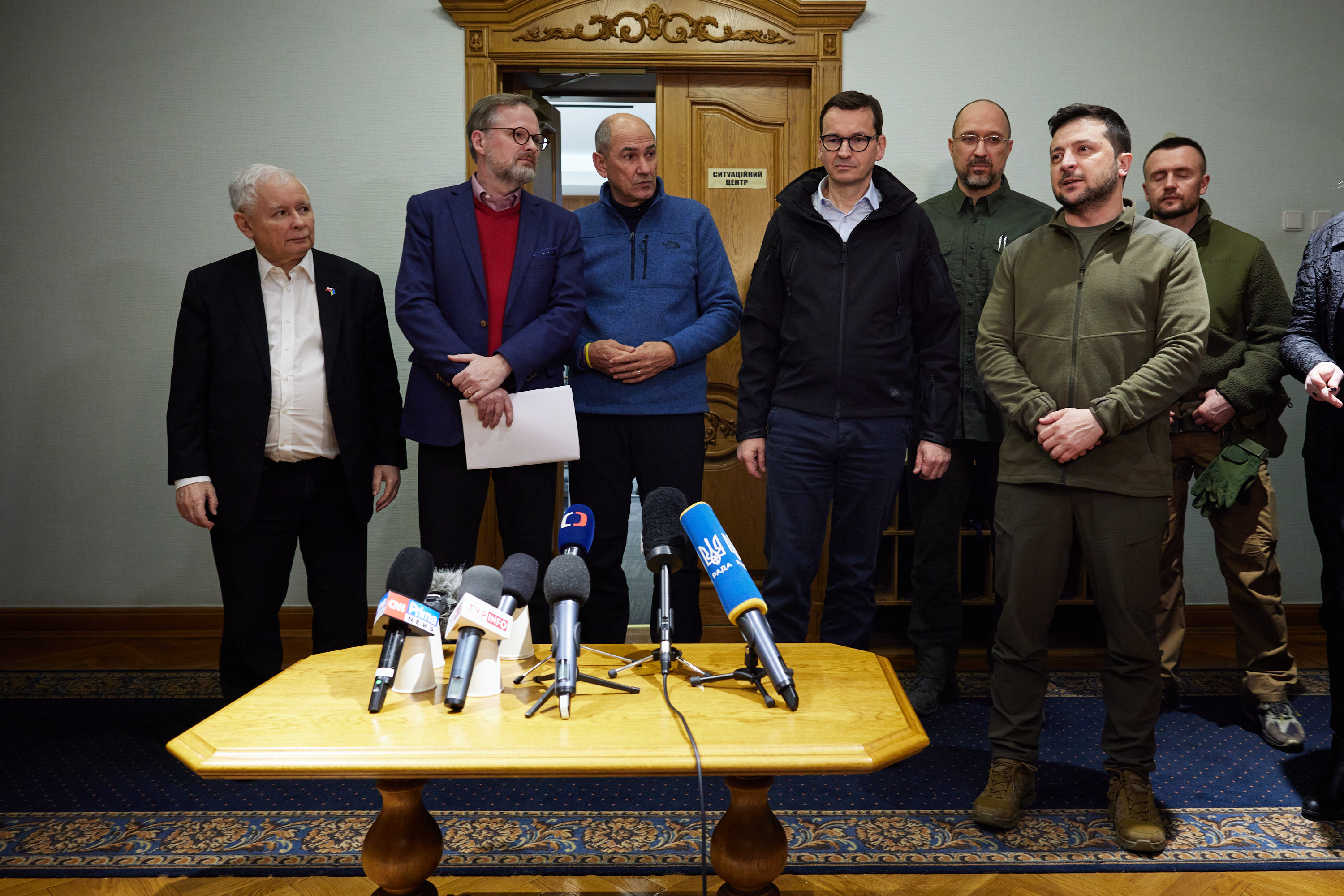
Zelenskyy with Polish Prime Minister Mateusz Morawiecki, Czech Prime Minister Petr Fiala, Slovenian Prime Minister Janez Janša and Deputy Prime Minister of Poland Jarosław Kaczyński, Kyiv, 15 March

On 15 March 2022, Polish Prime Minister Mateusz Morawiecki, together with Czech Prime Minister Petr Fiala and Slovenian Prime Minister Janez Janša, visited Kyiv to meet with Zelenskyy in a display of support for Ukraine. On 16 March 2022, a deepfake appeared online of Zelenskyy calling on Ukrainian citizens to surrender to Russia. The attack was largely deemed to have failed at its intended goal. The video is considered to be the first use of deepfake technology in a global-scale disinformation attack.

Zelenskyy has made an effort to rally the governments of Western nations to isolate Russia. He has made numerous addresses to the legislatures of the EU, UK, Poland, Australia, Canada, US, Germany, Israel, Italy, Japan, the Netherlands, Romania, and the Nordic countries.

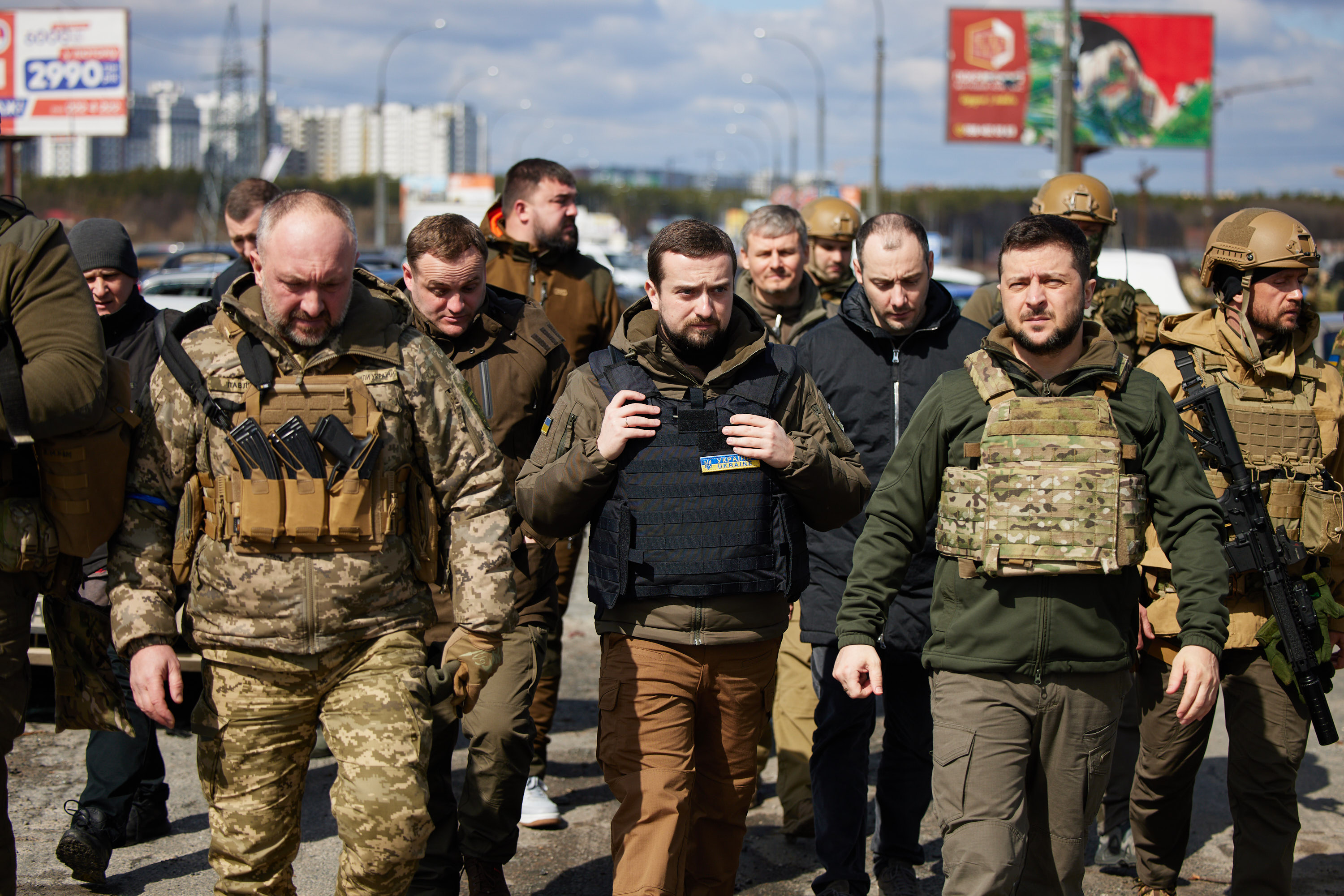
Zelenskyy in the Kyiv Oblast following the recapture of the region by Ukraine, 4 April

On 23 March, Zelenskyy was calling on Russians to emigrate from Russia so as not to finance the war in Ukraine with their taxes. In March 2022, Zelenskyy supported the suspension of 11 Ukrainian political parties with ties to Russia: the Socialist Party of Ukraine, Derzhava, Left Opposition, Nashi, Opposition Bloc, Opposition Platform — For Life, Party of Shariy, Progressive Socialist Party of Ukraine, Union of Leftists, and the Volodymyr Saldo Bloc. The Communist Party of Ukraine, another pro-Russia party, had already been banned in 2015 because of its support to the Donbas separatists. Zelenskyy also supported consolidating all TV news stations into a single 24-hour news broadcast run by the Ukrainian state during martial law.

In May 2022, Zelenskyy said that Ukrainian men of conscription age had a duty to remain in Ukraine. As Zelenskyy ordered a general military mobilisation in February 2022, he also banned men aged 18 to 60 from leaving Ukraine.

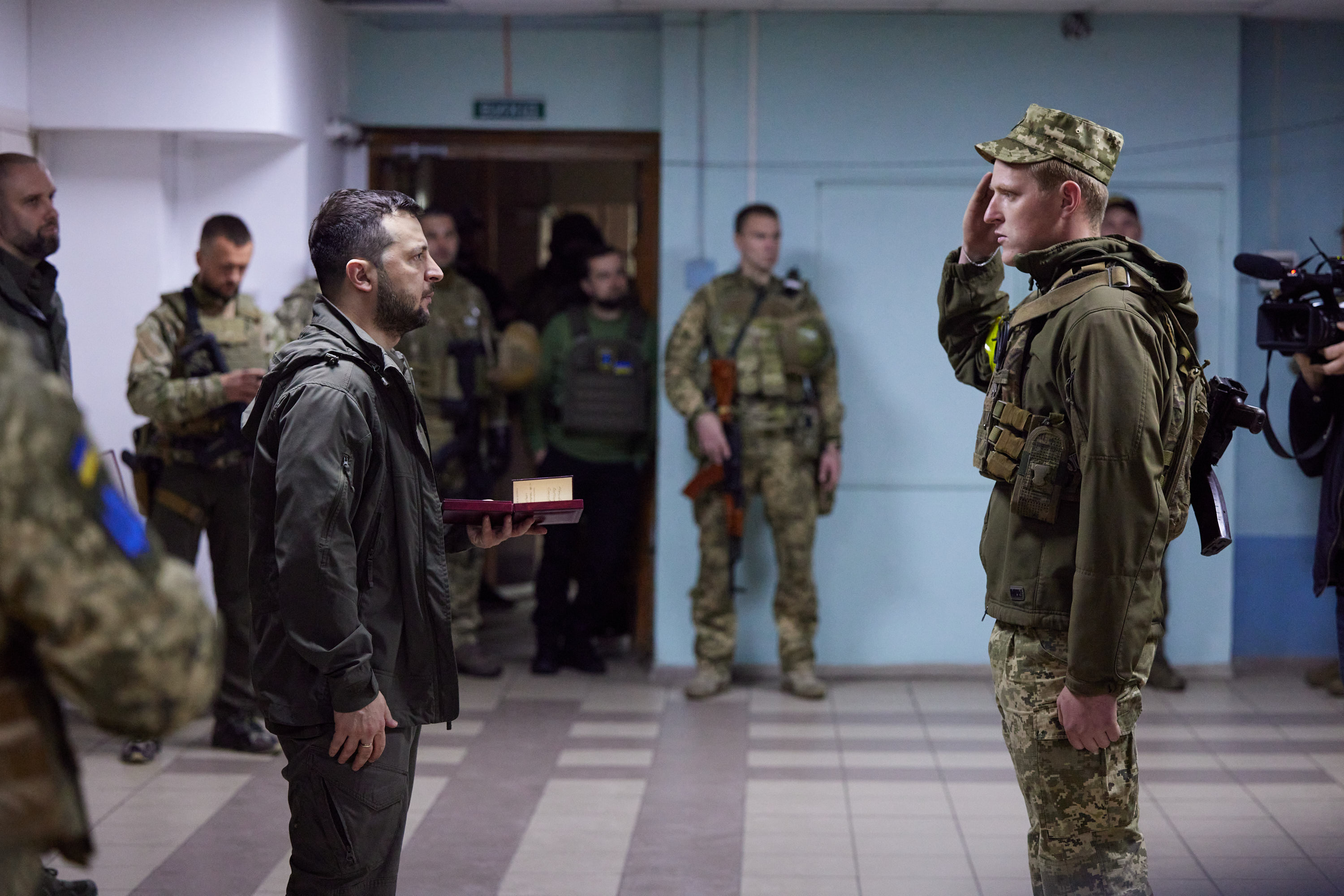
Zelenskyy awarding a soldier near the front line in the Kharkiv Oblast, 29 May

On 25 May 2022, Zelenskyy denounced suggestions by former US diplomat Henry Kissinger that Ukraine should cede control of Crimea and Donbas to Russia in exchange for peace. He said that Ukraine would not agree to cease fire until Russia agreed to return Crimea and the Donbas region to Ukraine, and that "Ukraine will fight until it regains all its territories". However, he later said he did not believe that all the land seized by Russia since 2014 could be liberated by force, "If we decide to go that way, we will lose hundreds of thousands of people."

On 30 May 2022, Zelenskyy criticised EU leaders for being too soft on Russia and asked, "Why can Russia still earn almost a billion euros a day by selling energy?" The study published by the Centre for Research on Energy and Clean Air (CREA) calculates that the EU paid Russia about €56 billion for fossil fuel deliveries in the three months following the start of Russia's invasion.

On 20 June 2022, Zelenskyy addressed African Union (AU) representatives via videoconference. He invited African leaders to a virtual meeting, but only four of them attended. On 20 July 2022, South America's Mercosur trade bloc refused Zelenskyy's request to speak at the trade bloc's summit in Paraguay.

==== Ukrainian counteroffensives and Russian annexations ====
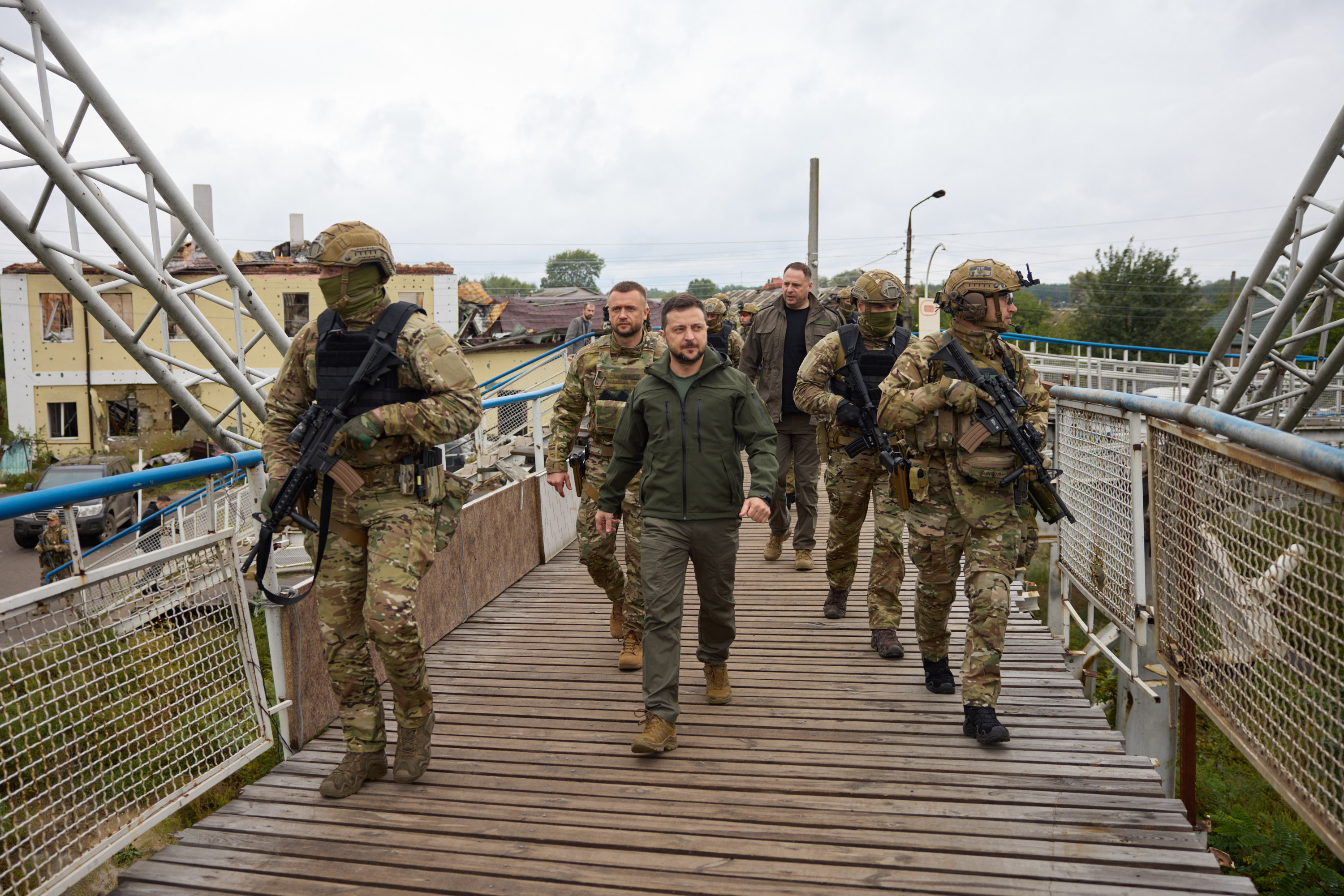
Zelenskyy near the frontline in the Kharkiv counteroffensive, 14 September 2022

Speaking about the 2022 Russian mobilisation, Zelenskyy called on Russians to not submit to "criminal mobilisation", saying: "Russian commanders do not care about the lives of Russians – they just need to replenish the empty spaces left" by killed and wounded Russian soldiers.

Following Putin's announcement of Russia annexing four regions of Ukrainian territory it had seized during its invasion, Zelenskyy announced that Ukraine would not hold peace talks with Russia while Putin was president.

On 25 September 2022, Zelenskyy said that Putin's threats to use nuclear weapons "could be a reality." He added that Putin "wants to scare the whole world" with nuclear blackmail. He also said that Putin is aware that the "world will never forgive" a Russian nuclear strike. When asked what kind of relationship Ukrainians and Ukraine will have with Russia after the war, Zelenskyy replied that "They took too many people, too many lives. The society will not forgive them," adding that "It will be the choice of our society whether to talk to them, or not to talk at all, and for how many years, tens of years or more."

On 21 December 2022, Zelenskyy visited the United States on his first foreign trip since the war began. He met with President Joe Biden and addressed Congress delivering his full speech in English. The United States announced they would supply Patriot missiles to Ukraine as had been requested.

==== 2023 ====
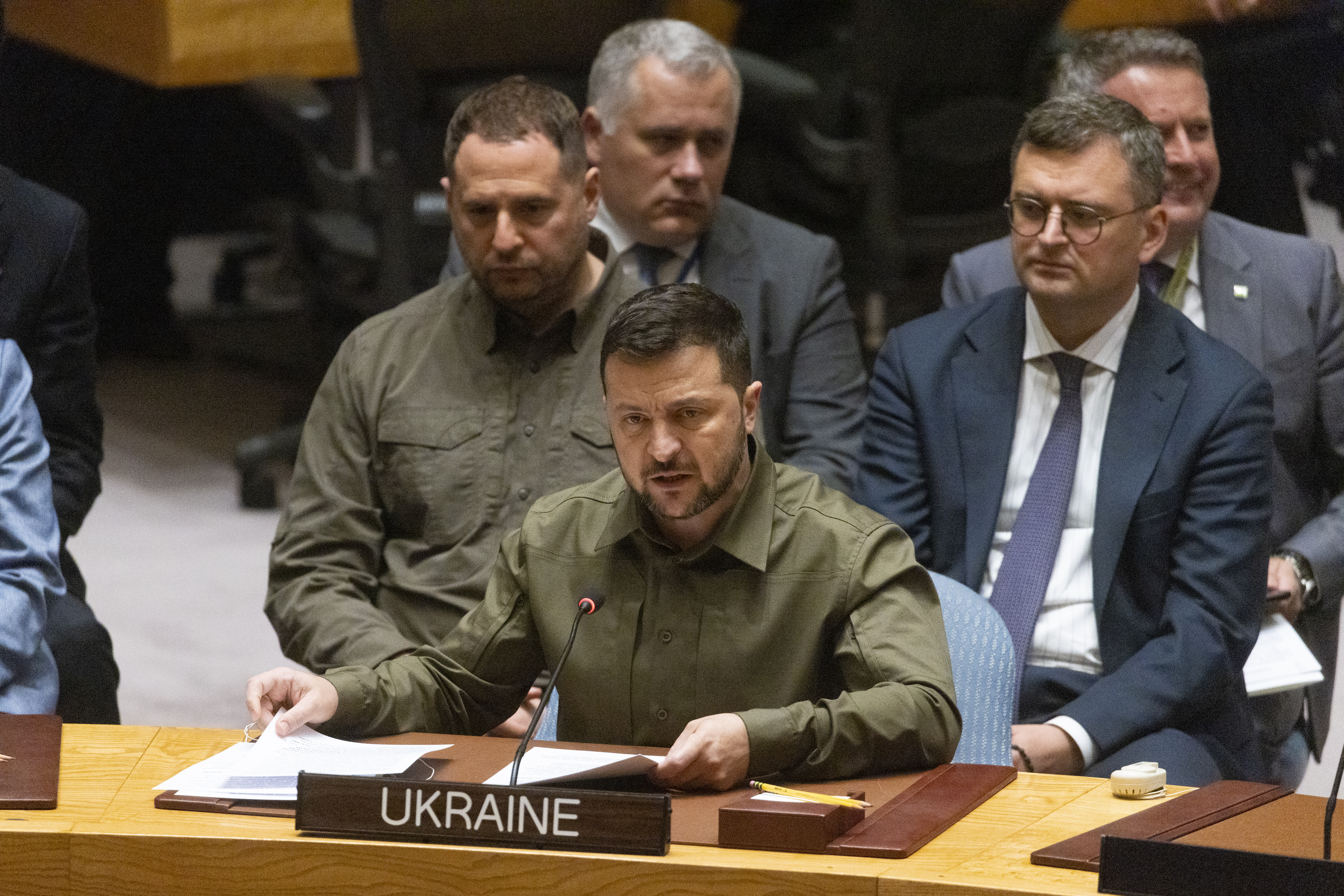
Zelenskyy at the UN Security Council in New York City on 20 September 2023

In early 2023, Zelenskyy signed a new law declaring that desertion, or "failure to report for duty without a valid reason," would result in up to 12 years in prison. Over a year later in late 2024, the Verkhovna Rada passed bills decriminalising soldiers' first instance of desertion or absence without leave if they returned to their duty station, and allowing these soldiers to return to military service.

In May 2023, he visited the International Criminal Court in The Hague and said he would like to see Putin stand trial for war crimes committed during the war in Ukraine, including the crime of aggression.

By 1 June the Battle of Bakhmut had been decided in Russia's favour.

On 19 September 2023, in a speech to the UN General Assembly, Zelenskyy called on neutral countries in Latin America, Africa and Asia to abandon their neutrality and support Ukraine. In October 2023, after the Hroza missile attack, he criticised countries supporting Russia, saying "all those who help Russia circumvent sanctions are criminals."

==== 2024 ====
On 8 February 2024 Zelenskyy decommissioned General Valery Zaluzhny as Commander-in-Chief of the Ukrainian Armed Forces, and promoted General Oleksandr Syrskyi in his stead. On 17 February Syrskyi said Ukrainian forces were withdrawing from Avdiivka to avoid encirclement.

On 25 June 2024 Zelenskyy decommissioned Lt. Gen. Yuriy Sodol, who had been promoted in February to Syrskyi's now-vacant position. He installed Brig. Gen. Andriy Hnatov to replace Sodol.

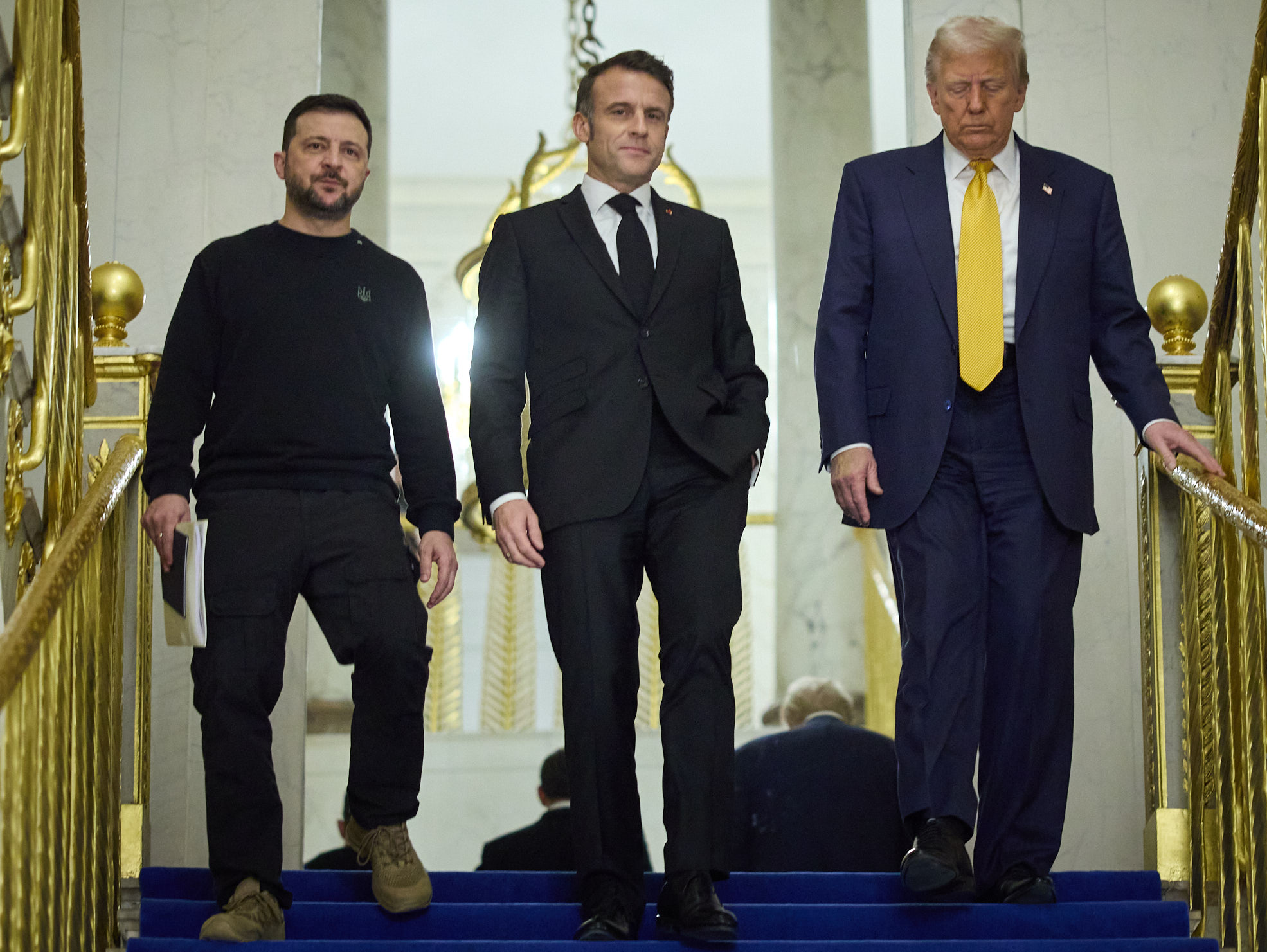
Zelenskyy with French President Emmanuel Macron and U.S. President-elect Donald Trump in Paris on 7 December 2024

In April 2024, Zelenskyy signed a new mobilisation law to increase the number of troops. He also signed into law a measure lowering Ukraine's army mobilisation age from 27 to 25.

In June 2024, Zelenskyy said that China's support for Russia would prolong the war in Ukraine. According to Zelenskyy, Russia used Chinese diplomats to undermine the Ukraine peace summit in Switzerland.

In July 2024, Zelenskyy criticised Narendra Modi's meeting with Putin on the same day that Russian missile strikes hit the children's hospital Okhmatdyt in Kyiv, saying "It is a huge disappointment and a devastating blow to peace efforts to see the leader of the world's largest democracy hug the world's most bloody criminal in Moscow on such a day."

On 30 August 2024, Zelenskyy decommissioned Lt Gen Mykola Oleshchuk, who had headed the Ukrainian Air Force since 2021, shortly after the death of F-16 pilot Col Oleksiy Mes during a Russian missile attack. Politician Maryana Bezuhla claimed the pilot's jet had been shot down by the friendly fire of an anti-aircraft missile, and the death is under investigation. Zelenskyy did not specify a reason for the dismissal, but said "we must...take care of all our warriors." Zelenskyy also said: "I have decided to replace the commander of the Air Forces... I am eternally grateful to all our military pilots," the next day after the pilot's death.

In October 2024, Zelenskyy unveiled the Victory Plan for Ukraine. The plan included five points: one geopolitical, two military, one economic, and one related to national defence and safety.

In December 2024, Zelenskyy resisted pressure from the Biden administration to lower the conscription age to 18 to replace Ukraine's battlefield losses. In February 2025, he said that Ukraine would introduce special military contracts for volunteers aged 18 to 24.

On 4 September 2024, most of the Shmyhal Government cabinet tendered their resignations while Zelenskyy considered his reshuffle.

==== 2025 ====
===== 2025 United States Oval Office meeting =====
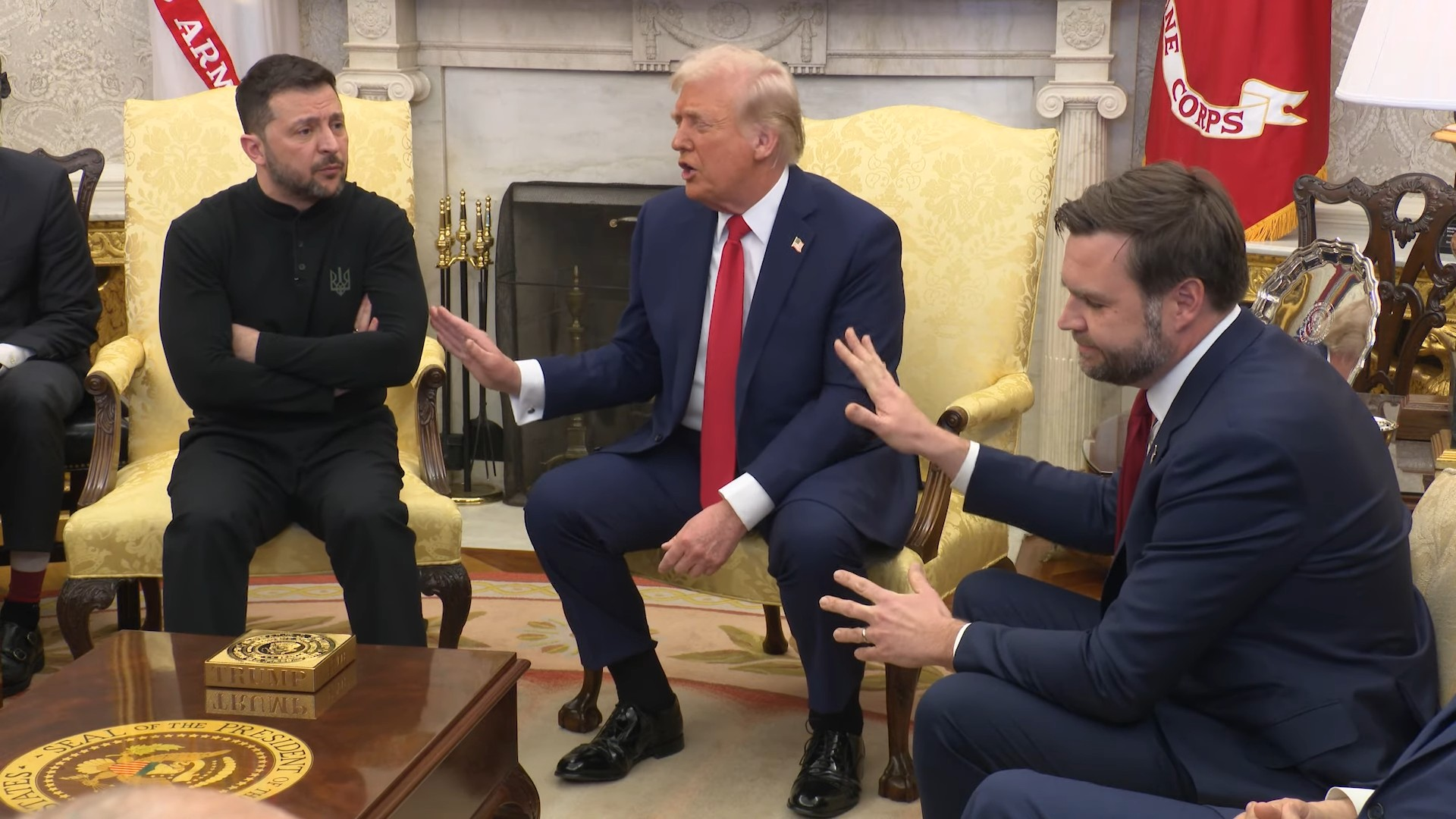
Donald Trump and JD Vance arguing with Zelenskyy in the Oval Office

In February 2025, Zelenskyy met with U.S. President Trump at the White House to discuss a proposed agreement which would give the United States the right to extract rare minerals from Ukrainian soil. The meeting soon turned into a heated exchange with Trump and Vice President JD Vance against Zelenskyy. The planned lunch, discussions, and signing were all cancelled and Zelenskyy was evicted from the White House.

In the aftermath of the meeting, the Trump administration suspended the provision of intelligence and military aid to Ukraine for around a week. The provision of aid to Ukraine was resumed after Zelenskyy agreed to an unconditional 30-day ceasefire, contingent on Russian approval (as Russia rejected the proposal, the ceasefire did not actually materialise).

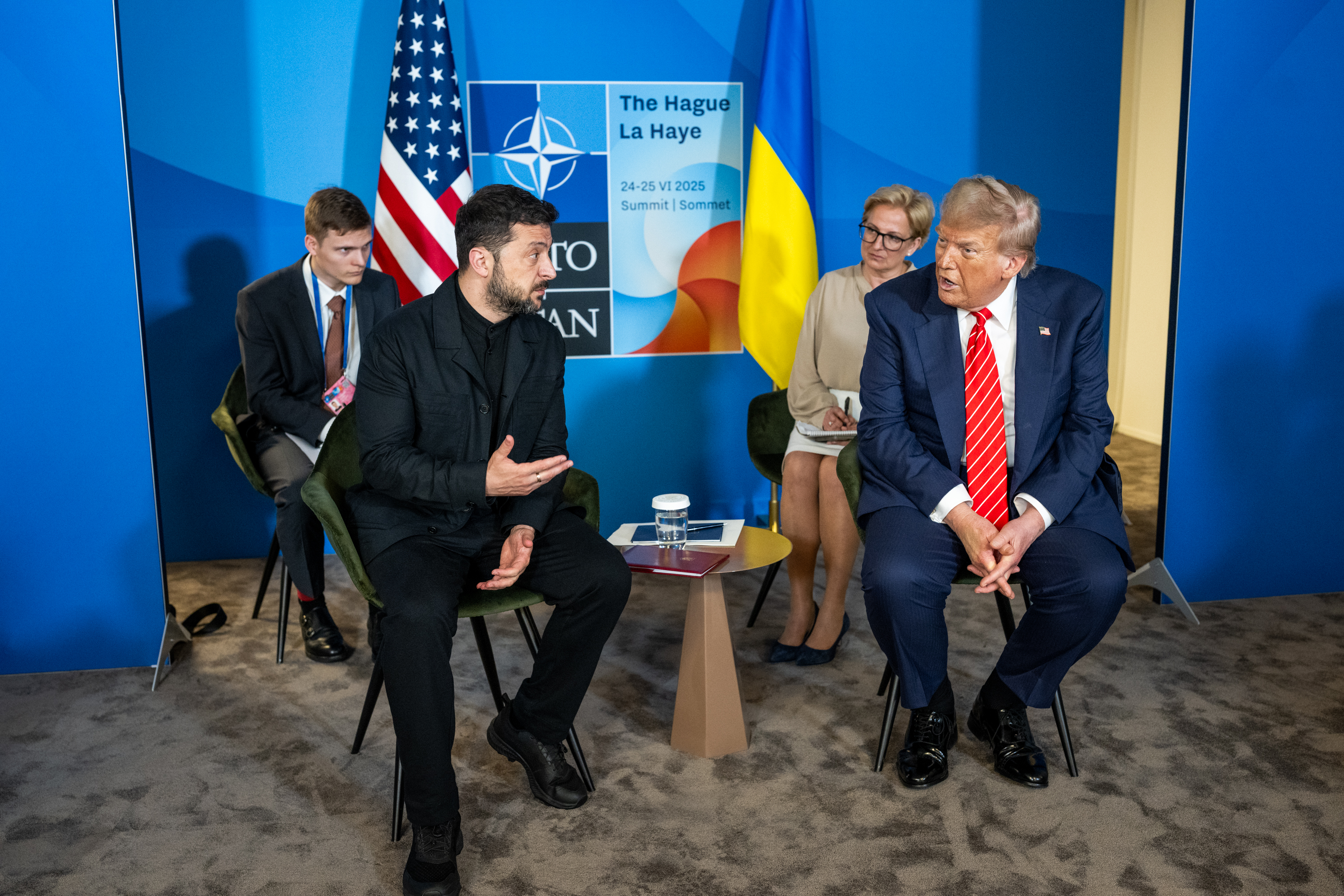
Zelenskyy and U.S. President Donald Trump at NATO summit in The Hague, 25 June 2025

In June 2025, after talks with Zelenskyy at The Hague NATO summit, Trump said he was considering sending more Patriot missile batteries to Ukraine to protect Kyiv from Russian attacks.

===== 2025 anti-corruption protests =====
On 22 July 2025, despite calls to veto, Zelenskyy signed a controversial law that removed independence from two Ukrainian anti-corruption bodies, the National Anti-Corruption Bureau of Ukraine (NABU) and Specialised Anti-Corruption Prosecutor's Office (SAPO), and gave more power to the government's Prosecutor General, Zelenskyy loyalist Ruslan Kravchenko. Critics of the law have said it may hurt Ukraine's efforts to join the European Union, while EU officials have called the law a "step back".

After widespread protest across multiple cities, Zelenskyy submitted a new draft law aimed at restoring the independence of NABU and SAPO. He stated the new bill would protect the agencies from Russian influence while preserving their independence, though no details were given. According to NABU, the proposal restores both bodies' full powers and safeguards. The new bill was adopted by parliament and signed by Zelenskyy on 31 July 2025; Zelenskyy said it was "very important that the state listens to public opinion".

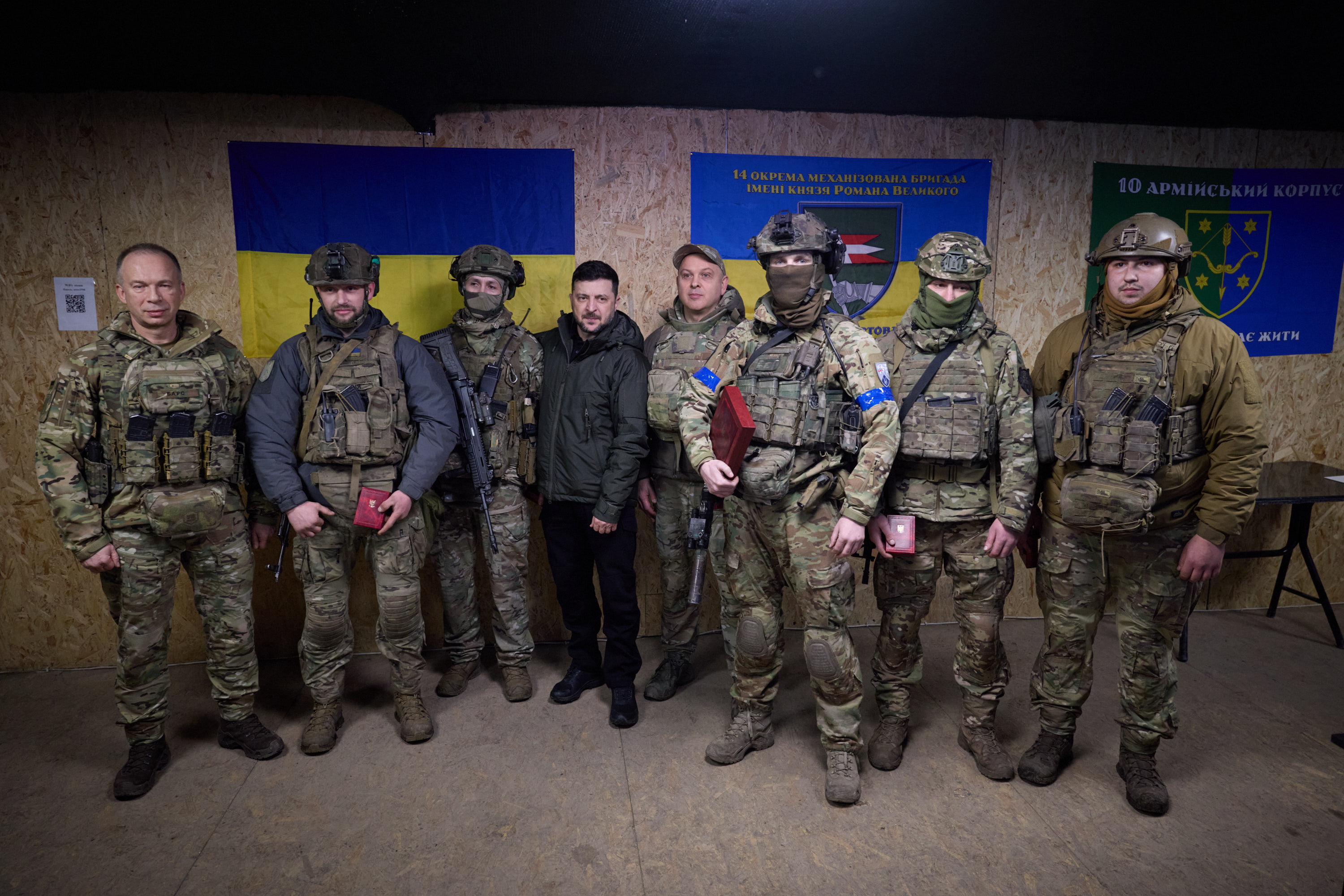
Zelenskyy and Commander-in-Chief Oleksandr Syrskyi with members of the 14th Mechanized Brigade on the Kupiansk front, 12 December 2025

In October 2025, Zelenskyy welcomed US sanctions against Russia's largest oil companies Rosneft and Lukoil.

In an interview published on 25 September, Zelenskyy suggested he would not seek a second term after the war ends. On 15 December 2025, he said in an interview with ZDF that he would run if the next election was held during the war, but was unsure if he would run in peacetime.

==== 2026 ====
In January 2026, Zelenskyy voiced strong support for the anti-government protests in Iran, describing them as an 'uprising' and calling on the international community to help the Iranian people achieve regime change. Speaking at the World Economic Forum in Davos, Zelenskyy criticised the international community for "standing aside" while the protests were "drowned in blood".

In April 2026, Zelenskyy met with German Chancellor Friedrich Merz in Berlin to sign a $4.7 billion bilateral defence partnership agreement. The pact focused on drone co-production, missile deliveries, and battlefield data sharing. During the meeting, Zelenskyy also addressed personnel shortages in Ukraine, saying that the country faced an estimated 200,000 military desertions and two million draft-dodgers. He noted the need for military personnel rotations and called for the return of mobilisation-age men who had, according to Zelenskyy, left Ukraine illegally. Merz said that Germany would cooperate with Ukraine to restrict the asylum process for military-age Ukrainian men and facilitate their repatriation.

==== Calls for ceasefire and peace talks ====
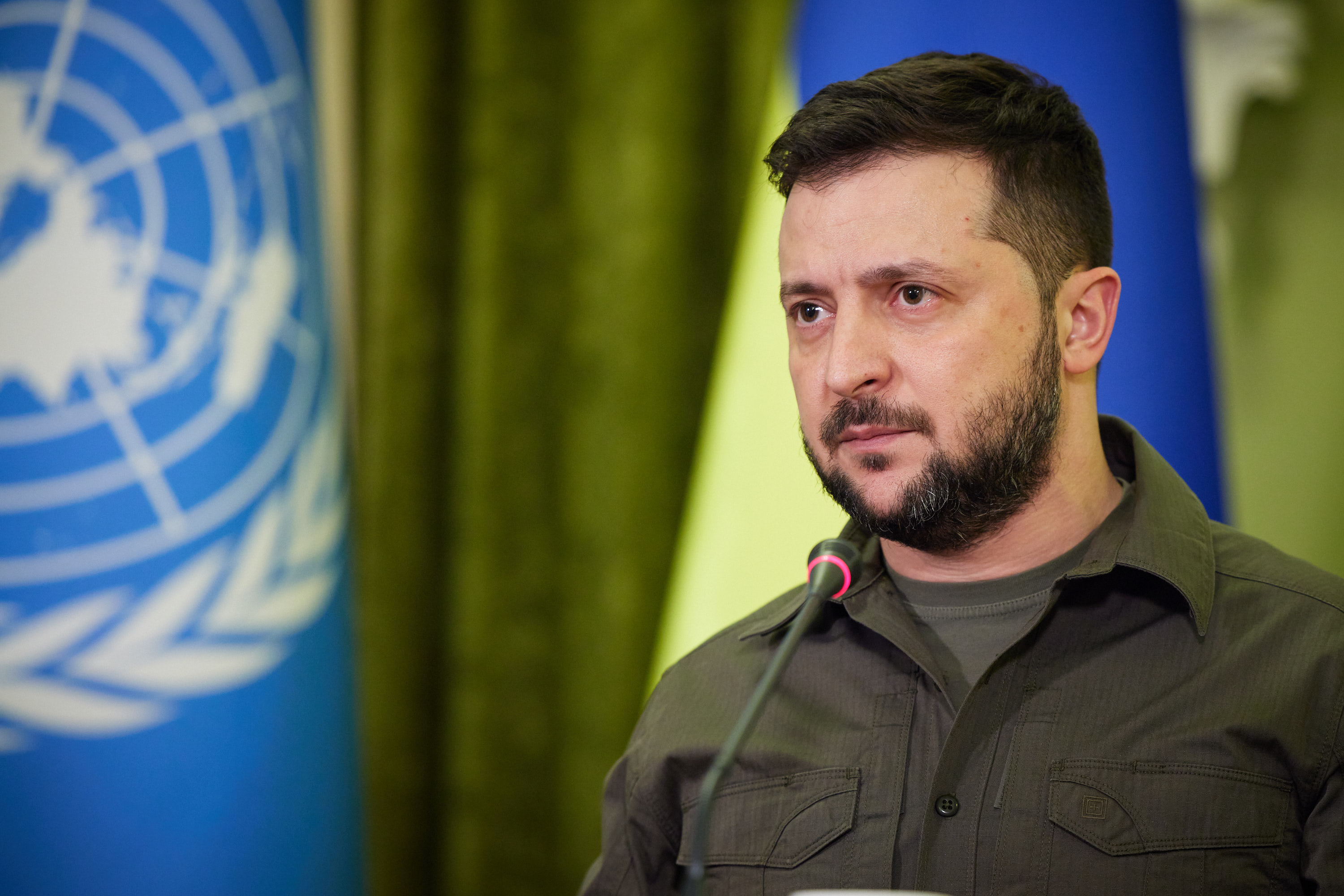
Zelenskyy at a meeting with the UN Secretary-General, April 2022

At the beginning of Russia's invasion, Zelenskyy said he was "ready for dialogue" but not "capitulation", and repeatedly called for direct talks with Putin. On 3 March 2022, he called for Putin to "sit down with me at the negotiating table. But not from 30 meters away, like with Macron and Scholz. I don't bite. What are you afraid of?". This was referring to the long table Putin uses for meetings.

During the early negotiations in March 2022, Zelenskyy said his priorities were to stop the invasion, protect Ukraine's sovereignty, and for Ukraine to be given "real" security guarantees to prevent further Russian aggression. In an interview with Russian journalists on 27 March 2022, Zelenskyy said he was willing to discuss Ukraine becoming a neutral country, in exchange for security guarantees, and that he was willing to negotiate the status of Russian-occupied Crimea and the Donbas. He said there could be no peace deal without a ceasefire and Russian troop withdrawal. Russia's media watchdog Roskomnadzor ordered Russian media not to publish the interview.

As the talks in Istanbul stalled, Zelenskyy tried to break the deadlock by proposing two separate treaties: an agreement on security guarantees "from those who are prepared to give such security guarantees", and another bilateral agreement between Ukraine and Russia. Several countries had shown willingness to become guarantors of Ukraine's security, but none had committed. Zelenskyy said "Moscow would like to have one treaty that would resolve all the issues. However, not everyone sees themselves at the table with Russia. ... people are saying, sorry, we have seen what happened in Bucha, circumstances change".

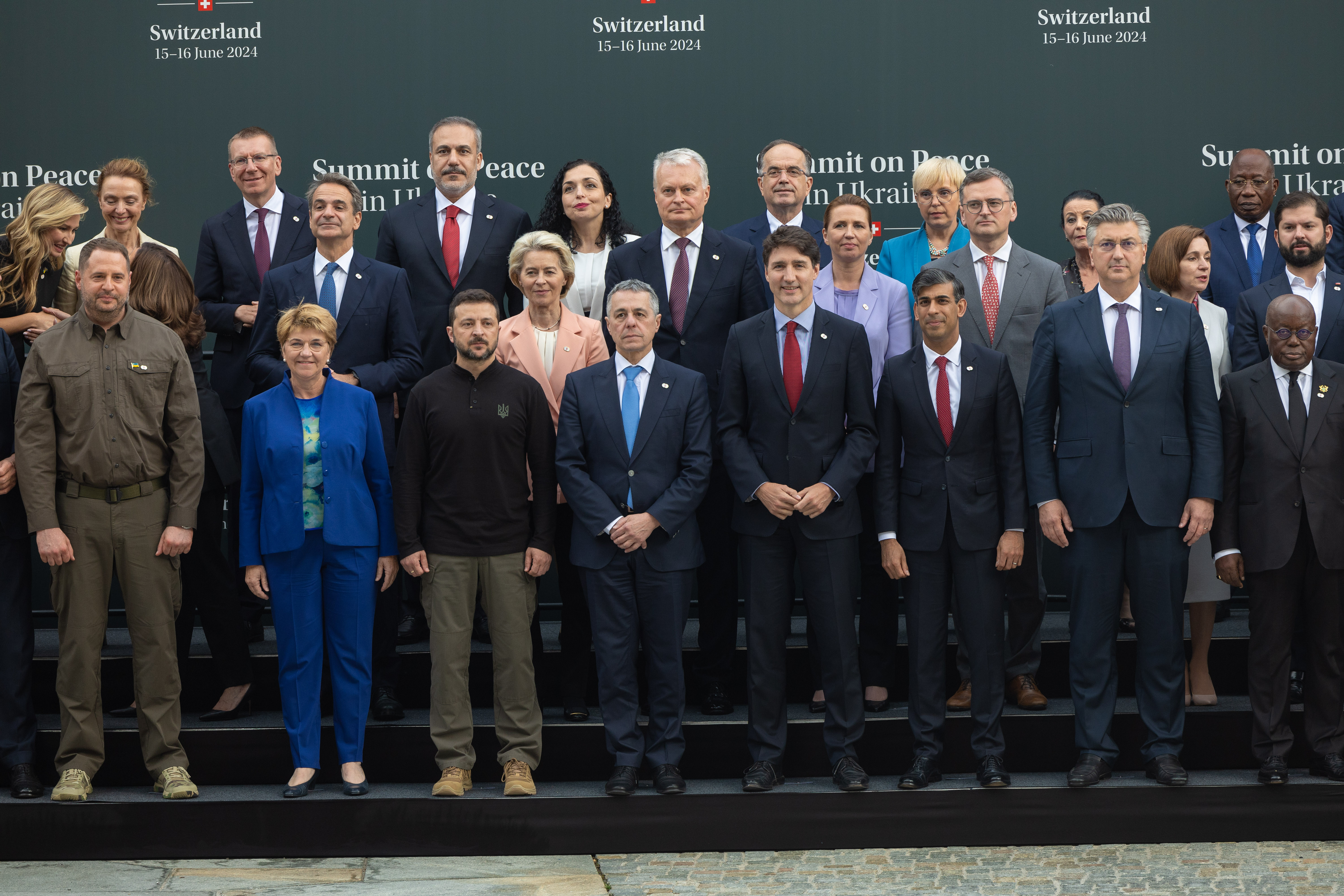
Zelenskyy and other world leaders at the June 2024 Ukraine peace summit

In November 2022, Zelenskyy proposed a 10-point peace plan. The key points were:

- A ceasefire and withdrawal of Russian military forces from Ukraine
- Release of prisoners and return of Ukrainian children deported to Russia
- Protection and restoration of Ukraine's energy infrastructure
- Prosecution of Russian war crimes
- Security guarantees for Ukraine to prevent future aggression

Russia rejected Zelenskyy's peace plan and reiterated that it would not give up any territory it has taken by force.

Zelenskyy accepted a proposal for a 30-day unconditional ceasefire in March 2025, which was supported by the US and European allies. Russia repeatedly rejected the ceasefire proposal and set out numerous conditions for halting its war. On 1 June 2025, Zelenskyy said:

We offered the Russians a ceasefire. Since March 11, the U.S. proposal for a full and unconditional ceasefire has been on the table. It was the Russians who chose to continue the war – even under conditions where the entire world is calling for an end to the killing. And pressure is truly needed – pressure on Russia that should bring it back to reality. Pressure through sanctions. Pressure from our forces. Pressure through diplomacy.

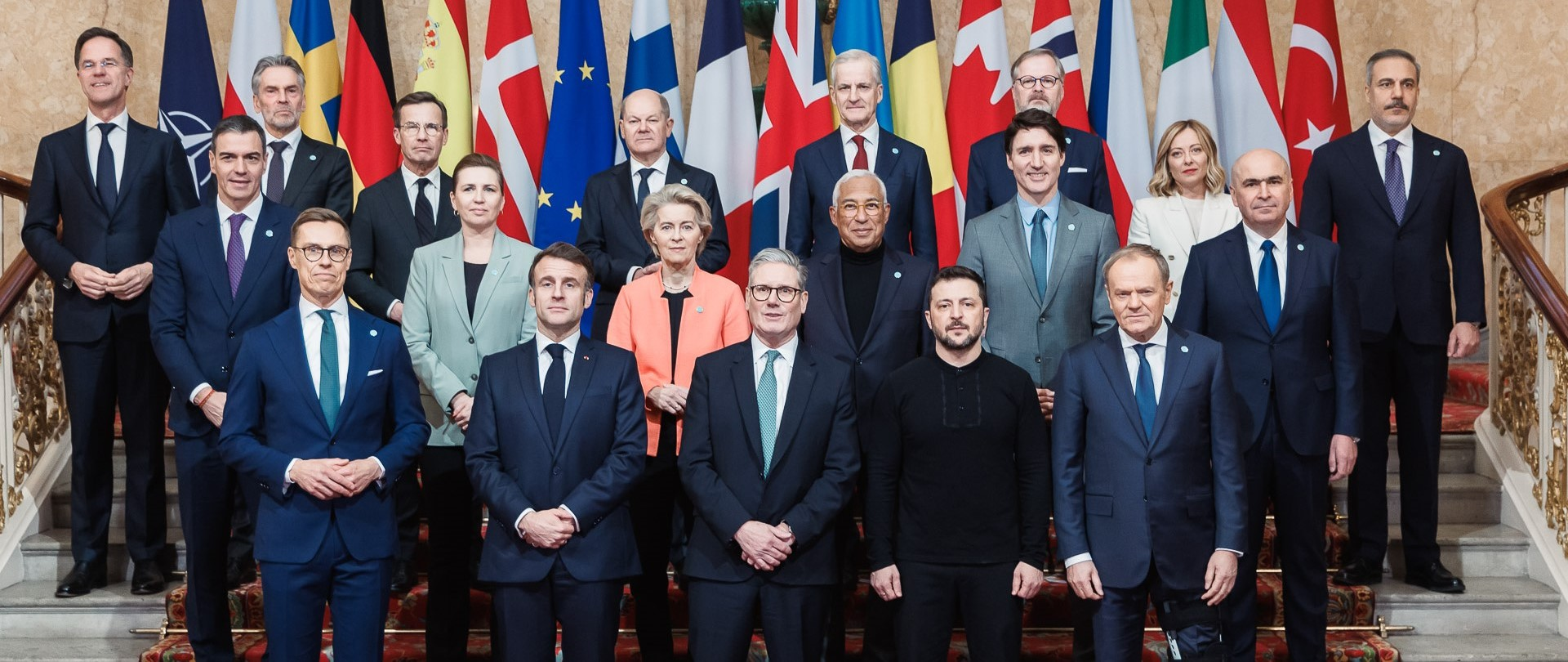
Zelenskyy and other leaders at the 2025 London Summit on Ukraine

On 15 May 2025, Russian and Ukrainian delegations held direct talks in Istanbul, for the first time since early 2022. Zelenskyy arrived in Turkey several days before and said he was ready for face-to-face talks with Putin. Zelenskyy said "There is no point in prolonging the killings. And I will be waiting for Putin in Turkiye ... I hope that this time the Russians will not look for excuses". He also called for a ceasefire as a first step in negotiations. Putin rejected the call for a ceasefire and turned down Zelenskyy's invitation. The Russians would not compromise on their "maximalist" demands, and the talks failed.

The US and Russia were due to hold a peace summit in Budapest, Hungary, in October 2025. US president Trump suggested that he would meet Putin and Zelenskyy separately at the summit. Zelenskyy said he was willing to go to the summit and talk directly with Putin, asking "how can there be deals about us without us?". Trump cancelled the summit, due to the Russians' refusal to compromise on their maximalist demands.

Zelenskyy travelled to Turkey again in November 2025 in a bid to revive negotiations with Russia on ending the war. However, Russian representatives declined to attend.

In November 2025, US president Trump adopted a 28-point peace plan, interpreted as broadly pro-Russian, and according to The Insider, at its core a recycled Russian document substantially written by Kirill Dmitriev. In late December 2025, Zelenskyy, his representatives, along with European allies and the US then produced revised versions of the peace plan, but these were rejected by the Russians.

In May 2026, Russia demanded a 48-hour ceasefire so that it could mark Victory Day on 9 May. The Russian defence ministry threatened a "massive missile strike on the centre of Kyiv" if its truce demand was not met. In response, Zelenskyy announced an unlimited ceasefire from 6 May, saying Ukraine would observe the ceasefire for as long as Russia did. However, Russia continued attacking Ukraine. Zelenskyy said:

They want Ukraine's permission to hold their parade – so they can safely take to the square for an hour once a year, and then go back to killing our people and waging war. The Russians are already talking about strikes after May 9. A strange and certainly twisted logic from the Russian leadership.

== Political views ==
=== Economic issues ===
In a June 2019 interview with BIHUS info, a representative of the president of Ukraine at the Cabinet of Ministers, Andriy Herus stated that Zelenskyy had never promised to lower communal tariffs, but that a campaign video in which Zelenskyy stated that the price of natural gas in Ukraine could fall by 20–30% or maybe more was not a direct promise but actually "half-hinting" and "joking". Zelenskyy's election manifesto mentioned tariffs only once – that money raised from a capital amnesty would go towards "lowering the tariff burden on low-income citizens".

=== Foreign policy ===
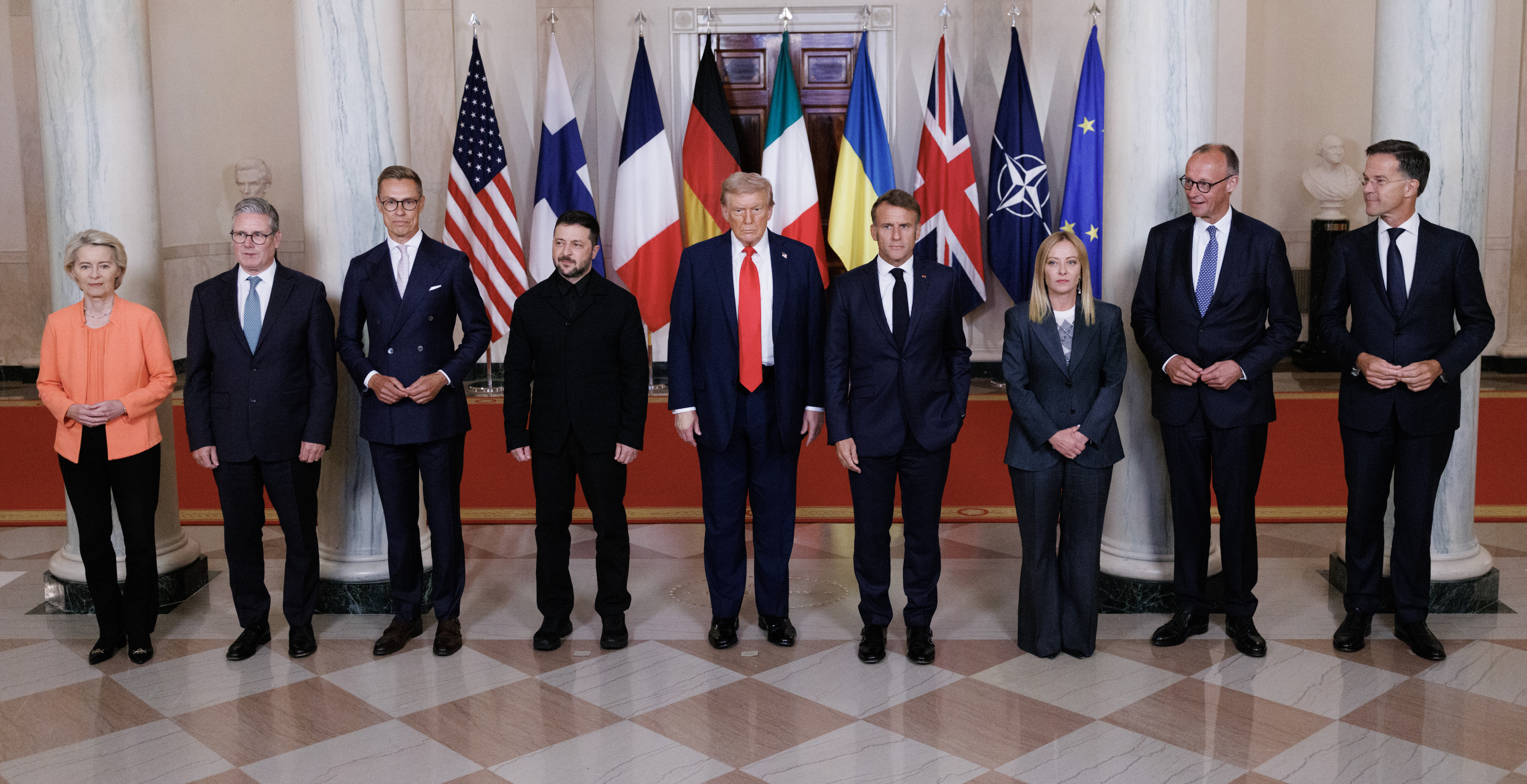
Zelenskyy with world leaders who attended the August 2025 White House multilateral meeting on Ukraine

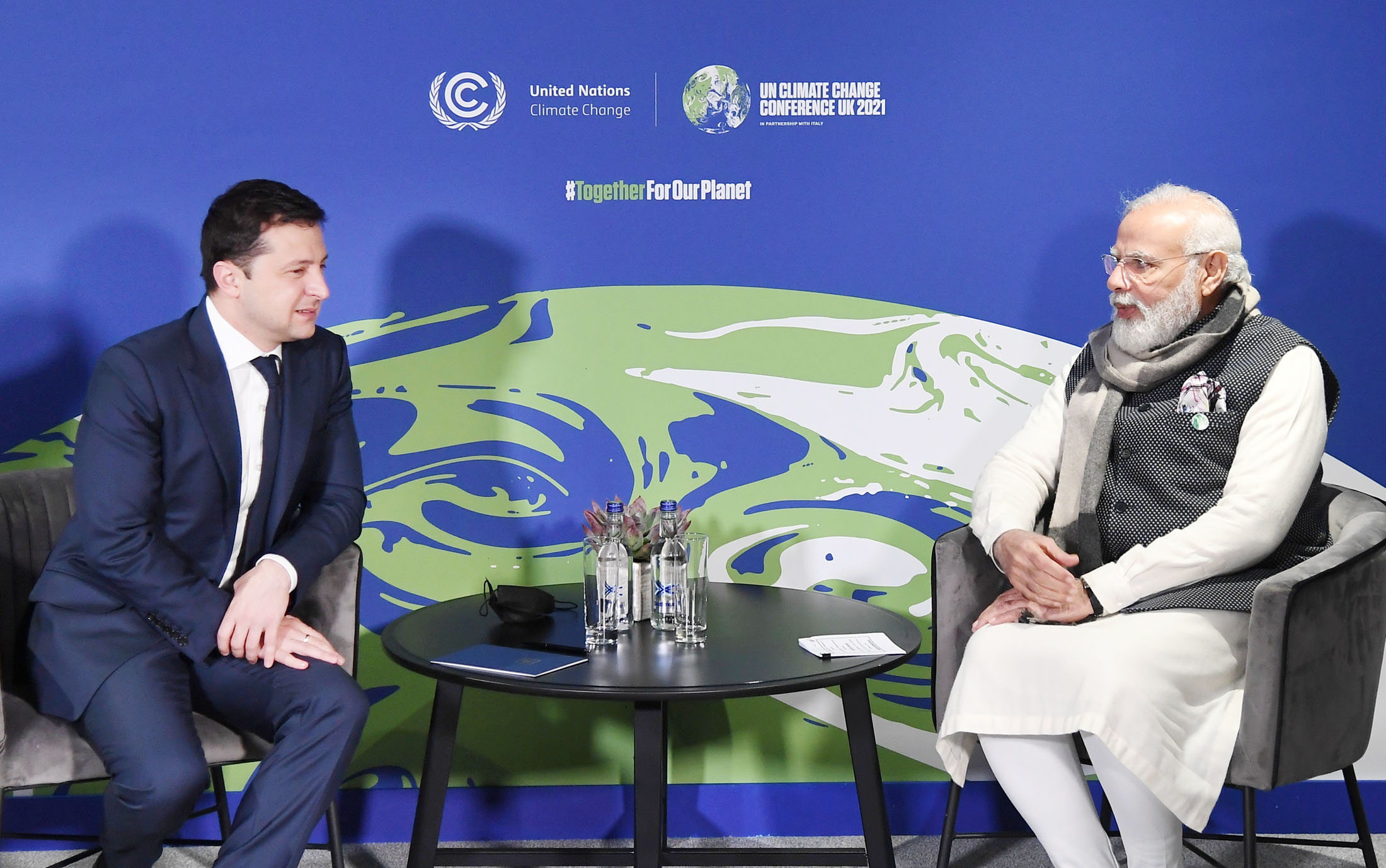
Zelenskyy and Indian Prime Minister Narendra Modi at the COP26 climate summit in Glasgow, November 2021

During his presidential campaign, Zelenskyy said that he supported Ukraine's joining the EU and NATO, but he said Ukrainian voters should decide on the country's membership of these two organisations in referendums. At the same time, he believed that the Ukrainian people had already chosen "eurointegration". Zelenskyy's electoral programme stated that Ukrainian NATO membership is "the choice of the Maidan and the course that is enshrined in the Constitution, in addition, it is an instrument for strengthening our defence". The programme stated that Ukraine should aim to apply for a NATO Membership Action Plan and apply for EU membership in 2024. During his election campaign, Zelenskyy said that he wanted to build "a strong, powerful, free Ukraine, which is not the younger sister of Russia, which is not a corrupt partner of Europe, but our independent Ukraine."

In February 2022, four days into the Russian invasion, he signed an application for Ukraine to join the EU. In September 2022, he signed the application for Ukraine to join NATO, after Russia proclaimed it had annexed the country's southeast. There is a lengthy process for joining both organisations.

Regarding China, Zelenskyy had tried to position Ukraine as a neutral party in the political and trade tensions between China and the United States. In January 2021, Zelenskyy said in an interview with Axios that he does not see China as a geopolitical threat and that he does not agree with the US assertions that it represents one. After the Russian invasion, in May 2022, Zelenskyy said he was satisfied with China's policy of staying away from the conflict. Zelenskyy says that China has the economic leverage to pressure Putin to end the war—"without China, Putin's Russia is nothing"—but says China had too often been silent instead of acting for peace.

Zelenskyy criticised Israel for refusing to sanction Russia over its invasion of Ukraine and refusing to give Ukraine defensive weaponry. Zelenskyy condemned Hamas' 7 October 2023 attack on Israel, and said Israel had a right to self-defence. As the Gaza war continued, Zelenskyy affirmed Ukraine's recognition of the State of Palestine and support for a two-state solution; called for international law to be followed; and expressed Ukraine's readiness to send humanitarian aid to Gaza and desire to prevent civilian suffering. In 2024, Ukraine sent 7,000 tons of wheat flour to the Palestinian territories, under the Grain From Ukraine programme launched by Zelenskyy. In 2026, Zelenskyy threatened to sanction Israel for buying large shipments of stolen Ukrainian wheat from Russia.

Zelenskyy spoke in support of Azerbaijan during the Second Nagorno-Karabakh War over the disputed region of Nagorno-Karabakh. He said in October 2020, "We support Azerbaijan's territorial integrity and sovereignty just as Azerbaijan always supports our territorial integrity and sovereignty".

==== Policy toward Russia and Donbas separatists ====
Zelenskyy supported the Euromaidan movement in late 2013 and early 2014. During the war in Donbas, he actively supported the Ukrainian army. Zelenskyy helped fund a volunteer battalion fighting in Donbas. In a 2014 interview with Komsomolskaya Pravda v Ukraine, Zelenskyy said that he would have liked to pay a visit to Crimea, but would avoid it because "armed people are there." In August 2014, Zelenskyy performed for Ukrainian troops in Mariupol and later his studio donated ₴1 million to the Ukrainian army. Regarding the 2014 Russian annexation of Crimea, Zelenskyy said that it might only be possible to return Crimea to Ukrainian control only after a regime change in Russia.

In an interview in December 2018 with Ukrainska Pravda, Zelenskyy stated that as president he would try to end the ongoing war in Donbas by negotiating with Russia. As he considered the leaders of the Donetsk People's Republic and the Luhansk People's Republic (DPR and LPR) to be Russia's "puppets," it would "make no sense to speak with them." He did not rule out holding a referendum on the issue. In an interview published three days before the 2019 presidential election (on 21 April), Zelenskyy stated that he was against granting the Donbas region "special status." In the interview he also said that if he were elected president he would not sign a law on amnesty for the militants of the DPR and LPR.

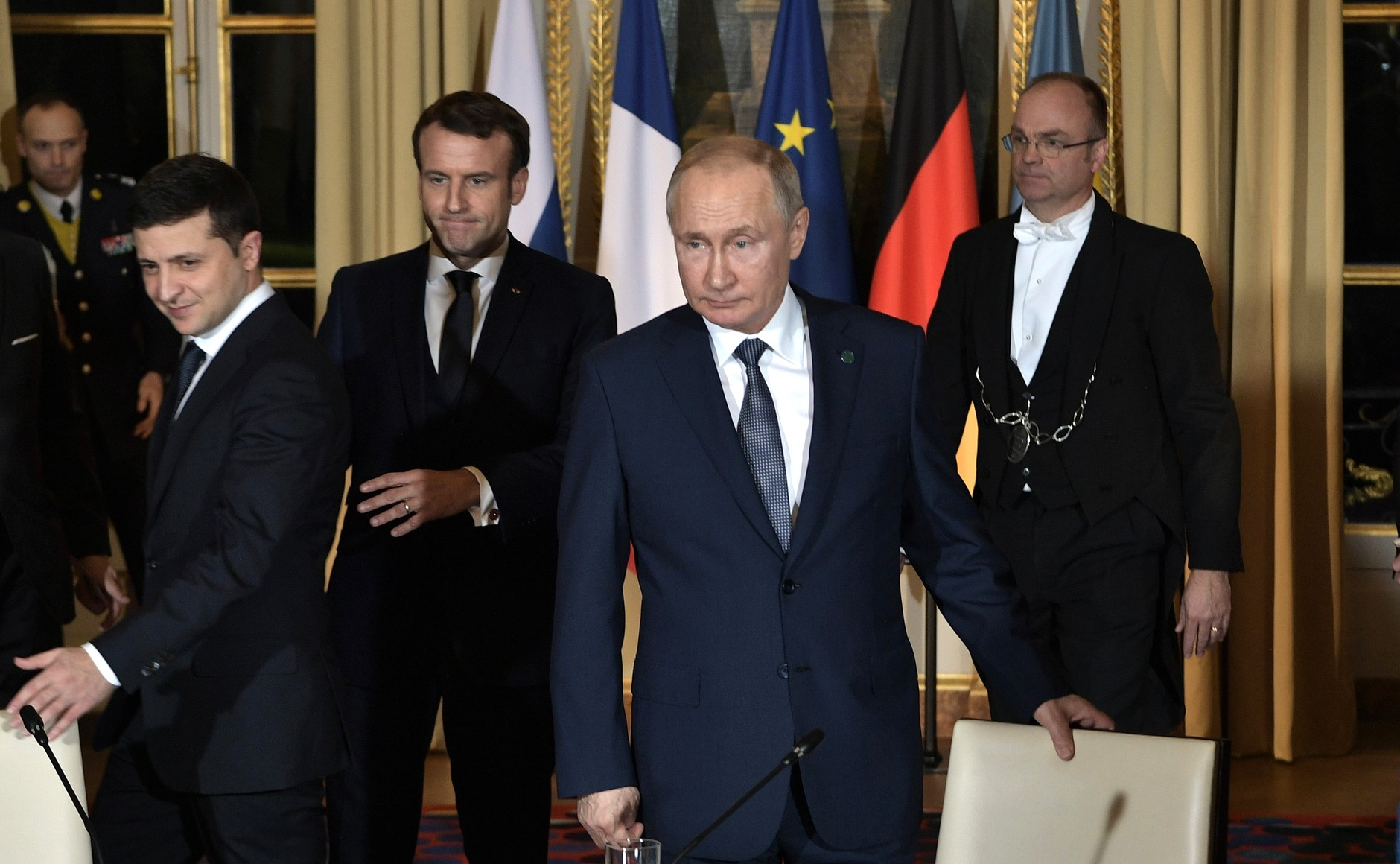
Zelenskyy, French president Emmanuel Macron and Russian president Vladimir Putin meeting in Paris on 9 December 2019 in the "Normandy Format" aimed at ending the war in Donbas

In response to suggestions to the contrary, he stated in April 2019 that he regarded Putin "as an enemy." On 2 May 2019, Zelenskyy wrote on Facebook that "the border is the only thing Russia and Ukraine have in common."

Zelenskyy opposed the Nord Stream 2 natural gas pipeline between Russia and Germany, calling it "a dangerous weapon, not only for Ukraine but for the whole of Europe."

=== Government reform ===
During the 2019 presidential campaign, Zelenskyy promised bills to fight corruption, including removal of immunity from the president, members of the Verkhovna Rada (Ukraine's national parliament) and judges, a law about impeachment, reform of election laws, and providing efficient trial by jury. He promised to bring the salary for military personnel "to the level of NATO standards."

Although Zelenskyy had earlier stated that he preferred elections with open list election ballots (such as in his inauguration speech), after he called the snap 2019 Ukrainian parliamentary election, his draft law "On amendments to some laws of Ukraine in connection with the change of the electoral system for the election of people's deputies" proposed to hold the election with closed lists because the 60-day term to the snap election did not "leave any chances for the introduction of this system." However, this bill was rejected by parliament.

=== Social issues ===
In 2014, Zelenskyy said he opposed targeting the Russian language in Ukraine and banning artists for their political opinions (such as those viewed by the Government as anti-Ukrainian). As a presidential candidate in April 2019, he stated that he was not against a Ukrainian language quota (on radio and TV), although he noted the quotas could be tweaked. He also said that Russian artists "who have turned into (anti-Ukrainian) politicians" should remain banned from entering Ukraine.

In October 2019, during his record 14-hour press conference, Zelenskyy was interrupted by a homophobic heckler and responded with irritation that he would not say anything negative about the LGBTQ community, because "we all live in an open society where each one can choose the language they speak, their ethnicity and [sexual] orientation. Leave those finally at peace, for God’s sake!" In response to an August 2022 petition demanding equal rights for same-sex couples, Zelenskyy affirmed that democracies were measured by how they ensure equal rights for all citizens, that "all people are free and equal in their dignity and rights", and that the family "consists of persons who live together, are connected by common life, have mutual rights and obligations"; he asked the Prime Minister of Ukraine to review civil partnerships for same-sex couples and called this "part of the work on establishing and ensuring human rights and freedoms". However, he said that same-sex marriage could not be introduced during wartime as this would require amending the Constitution of Ukraine, which defines marriage as "based on the free consent of a woman and a man", and the Constitution cannot be changed during martial law. Civil rights organisations such as Kyiv Pride praised the statement, though Holos MP Inna Sovsun criticised the lack of details about legal proposals for civil partnerships.

On 2 December 2022, Zelenskyy said his administration would enter a bill in the Verkhovna Rada that would ban "religious organizations affiliated with centers of influence in the Russian Federation", referring to the Ukrainian Orthodox Church (Moscow Patriarchate) (UOC-MP), from operating in Ukraine. The bill was passed by parliament and signed by Zelenskyy in August 2024, after opposition parties protested the bill's delay. The law treats each parish individually and gives it nine months to cut ties with the UOC-MP, following which a special commission will inspect individual parishes and file lawsuits against non-compliant ones; the court can then decide on a ban in each case.

In 2024, Zelenskyy said he would sign a law introducing civil partnerships in Ukraine if parliament passed it; however, that law remains stalled in parliament as of 2026.

In June 2026, Oleksandr Demenko, a veteran of Mariupol and head of the non-governmental organisation LGBT Military for Equal Rights, asked Zelenskyy during a cultural event whether Ukraine needed cultural products that would increase tolerance and normalise the LGBT community in Ukraine. In response, Zelenskyy spoke in favour of open public dialogue about LGBT rights in Ukraine: "I believe we need to speak openly with society about everything, and that is absolutely normal. We are all here with you, we are defending the state, we are equal and we have absolutely equal rights — regardless of any, I don’t know, prejudices of people from the 15th century. You and I are modern people."

== Public image and assessments ==
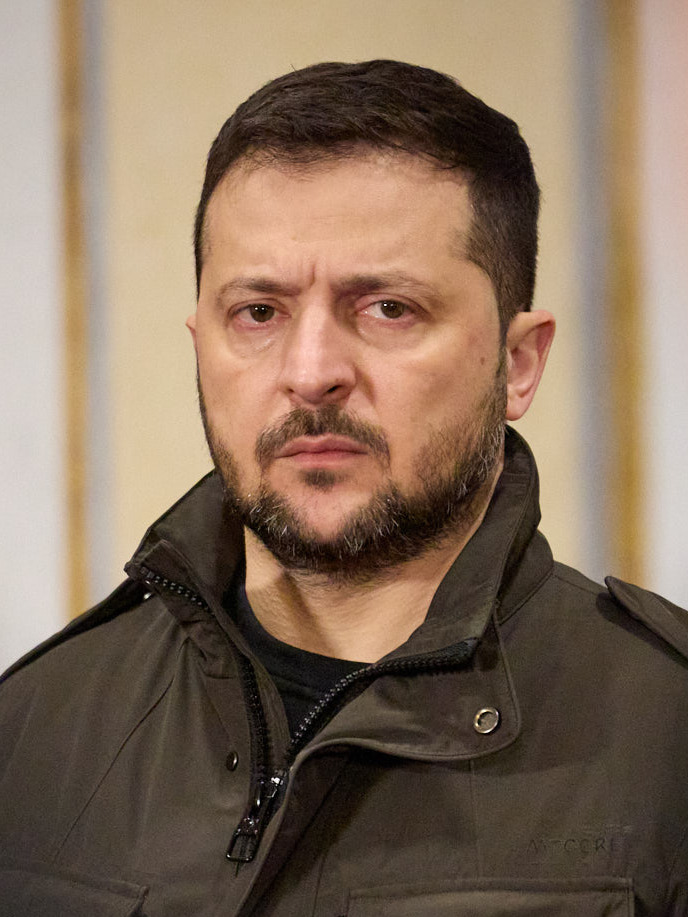
Zelenskyy on Holodomor Memorial Day in Dormition Cathedral, Kyiv Pechersk Lavra, 2023

A poll in May 2021 by the Rating Group gave Zelenskyy the highest trust rating out of all Ukrainian presidents, and ranked him as the second-best president after Leonid Kuchma.

Zelenskyy has gained worldwide recognition as the wartime leader of Ukraine during the Russian invasion; historian Andrew Roberts compared him to Winston Churchill. Harvard Political Review said that Zelenskyy "has harnessed the power of social media to become history's first truly online wartime leader, bypassing traditional gatekeepers as he uses the internet to reach out to the people." He has been described as a national hero or a "global hero" by many commentators, including publications such as The Hill, Deutsche Welle, Der Spiegel and USA Today. BBC News and The Guardian have reported that his response to the invasion has received praise even from previous critics.

In October 2022, a Rating Group poll ranked Zelenskyy the second most outstanding Ukrainian of all time, behind Taras Shevchenko. The same poll in August 2026 ranked him the fifth most outstanding Ukrainian of all time.

Zelenskyy's presidency has faced domestic and international criticism over media restrictions, the centralisation of power during wartime, and corruption allegations involving figures close to his administration. In February 2021, Zelenskyy imposed sanctions on several opposition-supporting television and media companies, which his government accused of being financed by Moscow and linked to pro-Russian politician Viktor Medvedchuk. The measure was supported by some Western partners as a response to Russian influence, but the United Nations human rights office later said that Ukraine's closure of television channels and online media outlets was "not in line with international human rights law".

During the Russian invasion, martial law postponed elections and restricted political activity, media operations, freedom of movement and public assembly. The Associated Press described this as a wartime paradox in which Ukraine, while defending itself as a democracy, had suspended or limited some democratic norms. Reuters reported in April 2025 that opposition politicians, including former president Petro Poroshenko, had begun to accuse Zelenskyy of using martial law to strengthen presidential power, although Poroshenko's party largely supported extending martial law because of continuing Russian attacks.

Zelenskyy's anti-corruption record has also been scrutinised. Reuters reported in 2023 that political opponents and anti-corruption campaigners had accused powerful figures of shielding deputy presidential chief of staff Oleh Tatarov from prosecution; Tatarov denied wrongdoing, and a case against him had been closed on procedural grounds.

In 2026, Reuters reported that a corruption investigation had reached Zelenskyy's inner circle after former chief of staff Andriy Yermak was named as a suspect in an alleged $10.5 million money-laundering scheme. Zelenskyy was not named in the investigation, and Ukraine's anti-corruption bureau said he was not a subject of any probe. Reuters described the case as a potential longer-term reputational risk for Zelenskyy, while noting that some lawmakers saw the investigation as evidence that Ukraine's anti-corruption institutions remained functional.

== Personal life ==
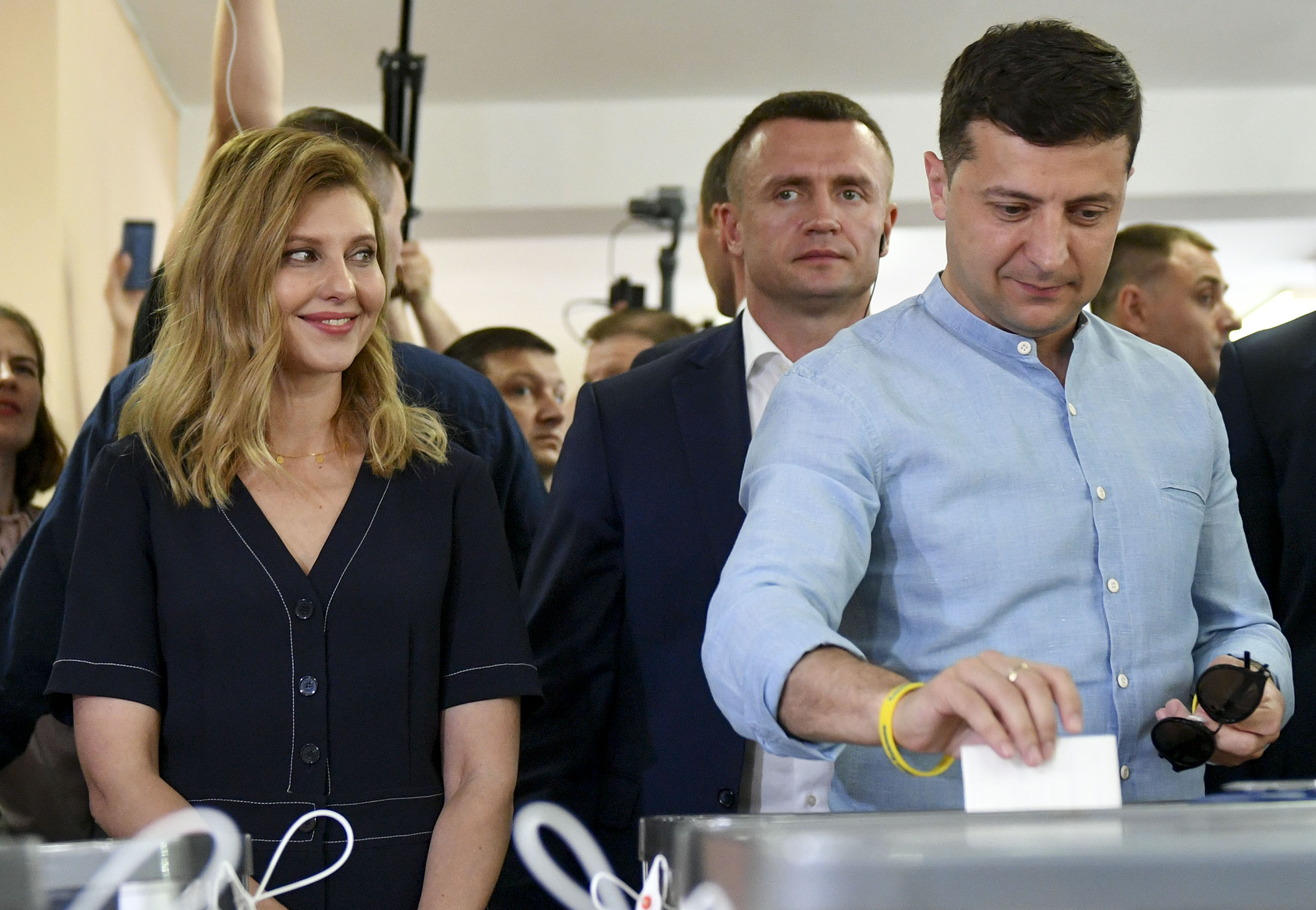
Zelenskyy with his wife Olena voting in the 2019 parliamentary election

In September 2003, Zelenskyy married Olena Kiyashko, with whom he had attended school and university. Kiyashko worked as a scriptwriter at Kvartal 95. The couple has two children: their first, daughter Oleksandra, was born in July 2004, and their second, son Kyrylo, in January 2013. In Zelenskyy's 2014 film 8 New Dates, their daughter played Sasha, the daughter of the protagonist. In 2016, she participated in the show Make the Comedian Laugh: Kids and won ₴50,000. The family, which lives in Kyiv, has two dogs, a cat, a parrot, and a guinea pig.

Zelenskyy's assets were worth about ₴37 million (about US$1.5 million) in 2018.

Zelenskyy's first language is Russian. He became fluent in Ukrainian later in life; he hired a tutor to improve his Ukrainian in 2017, and said in November 2019 after becoming president that he would like to improve his Ukrainian further. He also speaks English, and observers have noted that his command of English has improved during the full-scale war.

== Achievements, awards, and recognition ==
=== Teletriumph Awards ===
The Teletriumph Awards are the national television awards of Ukraine. Zelenskyy has won this award over 30 times, in multiple categories, in multiple years. However, Teletriumph 2018 remains the most recent award year; the awards were cancelled in 2019 due to reorganisational efforts, and again the following year due to COVID-19. In 2021, Zelenskyy served on the "Expert Council" of the Ukrainian Television Academy (UTVA), to oversee the restructuring efforts of the awards and the discussions for a new nomination process. As the television academy was finalising its award nominations for 2022, Russia invaded Ukraine. The awards are not considered permanently cancelled, but indefinitely suspended.

Year	Nominee	Category	Result	Ref.
2016	Servant of the People (Kvartal 95 Studio)	Best Feature Series	Winner	
2016	Production team for Servant of the People	Best Producer of a TV Series/Film	Winner	
2016	Screenwriting team for Evening Quarter	Best Screenwriter of a TV series	Winner	
2015	Volodymyr Zelenskyy for Evening Quarter	Best Host of entertainment programme	Winner	
2013	Volodymyr Zelenskyy for Evening Quarter	Best host of an entertainment programme	Winner	
2013	Production group of Fairytale Rus (Skazochnaya Rus)	Best producer (production group) of a television programme	Winner	
2013	Scriptwriting team of Evening Quarter	Best screenwriter (screenwriting group) of a television programme	Winner	
2011	Production team for Matchmakers 4	Best producer of a television series	Nominee	
2011	Screenwriting team for Evening Quarter	Best screenwriter of a TV programme	Nominee	
2012	Volodymyr Zelenskyy and Valeriy Zhidkov for Evening Quarter	Best host of an entertainment programme	Winner	
2012	Scriptwriting team of Evening Quarter	Best screenwriter (screenwriting group) of a television programme	Winner	
2010	Screenwriting team of Svaty	Best screenwriter of a television programme	Winner	
2010	Production group of Svaty	Best producer (production group) of a television film/series	Winner	

=== Awards and decorations ===
In 2022, British newspaper Financial Times and US magazine Time both selected Zelenskyy as Person of the Year.

- Ukraine: Honorary Diploma of the Cabinet of Ministers of Ukraine (2003)
- Belarus (in exile): Cross of Good Neighbourhood of the Democratic Belarus (2026)
- Czech Republic: Grand Cross with Collar of the Order of the White Lion (2022)
- Estonia: Order of the Tallinn Coat of Arms (2022)
- European Union: Distinguished member of the European Order of Merit (2026)
- Finland: Grand Cross of the Order of the White Rose of Finland with Collar (2025)
- France: Grand Cross of the Order of the Legion of Honour (2023)
- Germany:
  - Boris Nemtsov Prize (2022)
  - Charlemagne Prize (2023)
- Latvia: Member 1st Class of the Order of Viesturs (2022)
- Lithuania: Order of Vytautas the Great with the Golden Chain (2022)
- Moldova: Order of the Republic (2026)
- Poland:
  - Jan Karski Eagle Award (2022)
- Portugal: Grand Collar of the Order of Liberty (2023)
- Slovakia:
  - State Award of Alexander Dubček (2022)
  - Member 1st Class of the Order of the White Double Cross (2024)
- United Kingdom: Sir Winston Churchill Leadership Award (2022)
- United States:
  - Ronald Reagan Freedom Award (2022)
  - John F. Kennedy Profile in Courage Award (2022)
  - Philadelphia Liberty Medal (2022)
  - Ripple of Hope Award (2022)
  - Golden Plate Award (2024)
  - Four Freedoms Award (2026)

==== Revoked awards ====
- Poland:
  - Knight of the Order of the White Eagle (2023–2026) — revoked after Zelenskyy gave the honorary name "Heroes of the UPA" to an army unit, on soldiers' request. The Ukrainian Insurgent Army (UPA) were responsible for the massacres of Poles in Volhynia and Eastern Galicia.

=== Species named after Zelenskyy ===
Ausichicrinites zelenskyyi, an extinct species of feather star described on 20 July 2022 by a group of Polish palaeontologists, is named after Zelenskyy "for his courage and bravery in defending free Ukraine."

=== Other media ===
In 2023, American country music singer Brad Paisley released a song titled "Same Here", which features Zelenskyy in a spoken-word interlude.

== Selected filmography ==
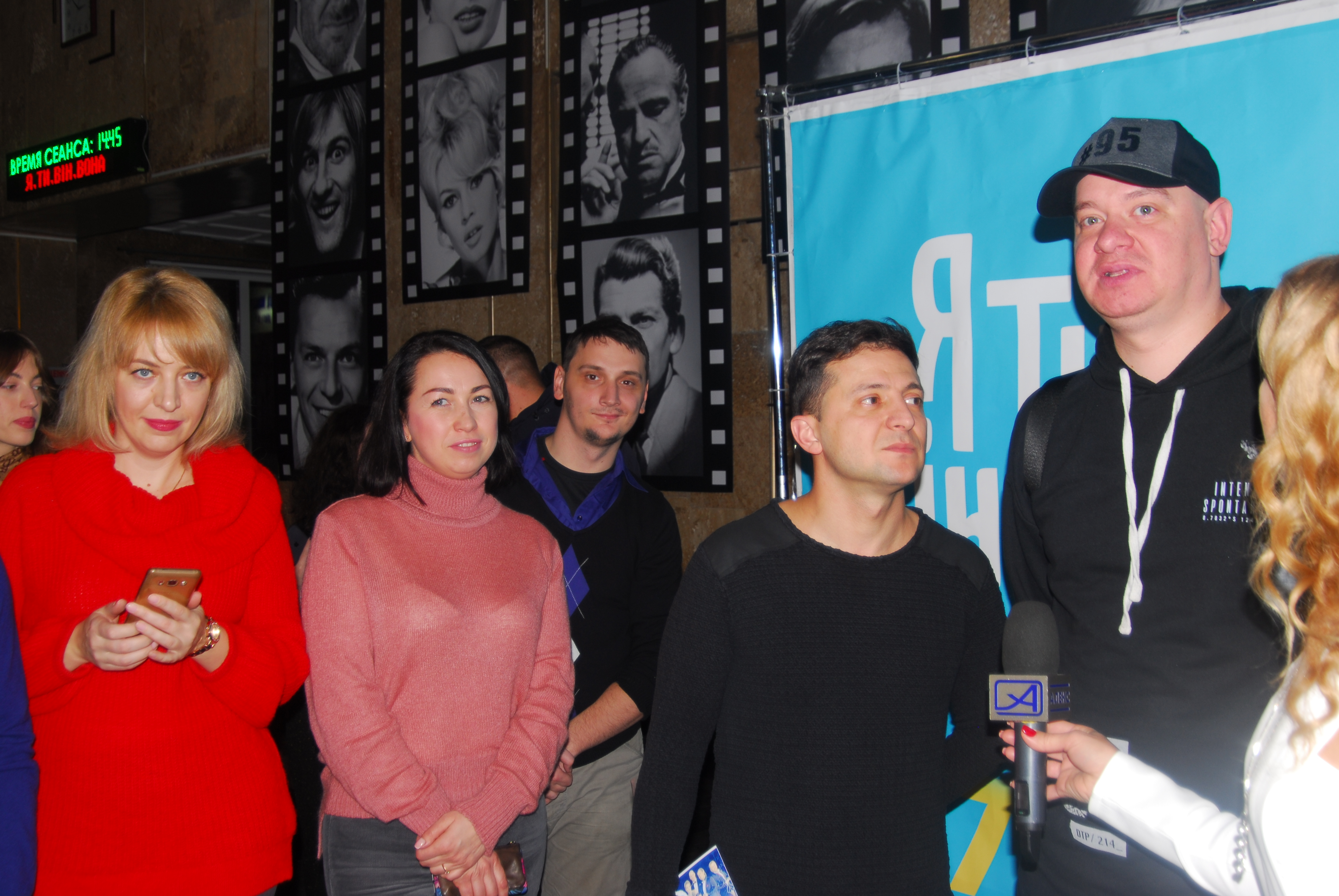
Zelenskyy (second from right) at the film premiere of I, You, He, She in 2018

=== Films ===
Year	Title	Role	Notes
2004	Three Musketeers	d'Artagnan	Also writer
2008	Horton Hears a Who!	Mayor Ned McDodd	Voice; Ukrainian dub
2009	Love in the Big City	Igor	
2010	Love in the Big City 2	Igor	
2011	Office Romance. Our Time	Anatoly Efremovich Novoseltsev	
2012	Rzhevsky Versus Napoleon	Napoleon	
2012	8 First Dates	Nikita Sokolov	
2014	Love in Vegas	Igor Zelenskyy	
2014	Paddington	Paddington Bear	Voice; Ukrainian dub
2015	8 New Dates	Nikita Andreevich Sokolov	
2016	8 Best Dates	Nikita Andreevich Sokolov	
2016	Servant of the People 2	Vasyl Petrovych Holoborodko	
2016	The Angry Birds Movie	Red	Voice; Ukrainian dub
2017	Paddington 2	Paddington Bear	Voice; Ukrainian dub
2018	I, You, He, She	Maksym Tkachenko	
2023	Superpower	himself; short interviews with Sean Penn	Documentary
2024	Turn in the Wound	himself; documentary film by Abel Ferrara	Documentary

=== Television shows and appearances ===
Year	Title	Role	Notes
2006	Dancing with the Stars (Ukraine)		as contestant
2008–2012	Svaty ("In-Laws")		as producer
Multiple	Teletriumph Awards	Award winner, host	Earned this award multiple times prior to 2022
2015–2019	Servant of the People	Vasyl Petrovych Holoborodko	
2022	64th Annual Grammy Awards	Guest appearance	Special message, as President of Ukraine
2023	12th NFL Honors	Guest appearance	Special message, as President of Ukraine

== Publications ==
- Zelensky, Volodymyr (2022). A Message From Ukraine: Speeches, 2019–2022. London: Hutchinson Heinemann. ISBN 978-1-5291-5354-5. OCLC 1374537388. A collection of sixteen of Zelenskyy's speeches.

== Notes ==
Political offices
Preceded by Petro Poroshenko	President of Ukraine; 2019–present	Incumbent
Party political offices
Preceded by Office established	De facto leader of Servant of the People; 2019–present	Incumbent
