= Me. You. He. She =

2018 film by Volodymyr Zelenskyy and David Dodson

- Theatrical release poster
- Directed by: Volodymyr Zelenskyy, David Dodson
- Written by: Evgeniy Burgela, David Dodson, Dmitriy Grigorenko, Andrey Ilkov, Yuriy Mikulenko, Aleksandr Shchur, Andrey Yakovlev, Volodymyr Zelenskyy, Aleksey Zhilenkov, Stanislav Zubritskiy
- Produced by: Boris Shefir; Serhiy Shefir; Andrey Yakovlev; Volodymyr Zelenskyy
- Starring: Anastasiya Korotkaya; Volodymyr Zelenskyy; Yevhen Koshovy; Nadiya Dorofeeva
- Cinematography: KinoKvartal
- Production companies: Kvartal 95 Studio, Ukrainian State Film Agency (supported by)
- Distributed by: B&H Film Distribution Company (Ukraine)
- Release date: December 27, 2018
- Running time: 90 minutes
- Country: Ukraine
- Languages: Russian, Ukrainian (dubbed)
- Box office: $2.7 million.

Me. You. He. She (Russian: «Я, ты, он, она», romanized: Ya, ty, on, ona; Ukrainian: «Я, ти, він, вона», romanized: Ya, ty, vin, vona) is a 2018 Ukrainian romantic comedy directed by Volodymyr Zelenskyy and David Dodson. The film stars Anastasiya Korotka and Volodymyr Zelenskyy. It was produced by the creative association Kvartal 95 Studio.

== Plot ==
Maxim and Yana have been married for 10 years. However, when prospects appear on the horizon, the couple decides to divorce. However, the court, not having heard 'legitimate' reasons for the divorce, according to the legislation of Ukraine, gives the spouses a month for reconciliation. The husband and wife decide during this time to explore their most daring dreams and fantasies that they had refused themselves for ten years of marriage.

== Cast ==
In the main roles were Yevhen Koshovyi, Nastya Korotka, Nadia Dorofeeva and Volodymyr Zelenskyy. Further roles were cast with the actors Stas Baklan, Olga Sumska, Sergei Babkin, Yuriy Tkach and Olga Polyakova.

Role	Actor
Maxim Tkachenko	Volodymyr Zelenskyy
Yana Tkachenko	Anastasiya Korotka
Borys	Yevhen Koshovyi
Lyena	Dorofeeva
Neighbour	Stanislav Boklan
Neighbour	Olha Sumska
Judge	Tamara Yatsenko
Judge's assistant	Boris Knizhenko
Real Estate Agent	Daryna Trehubova
Bully #1	Sergey Babkin
Bully #2	Sergey Bibilov
Senior doctor	Aleksandr Ignatusha
Leader of "fights without rules"	Oleksandr Pikalov
Yana's father	Yuriy Vysotsky
Yana's grandfather	Valeriy Sheptekita
Yana's mother	Nadiya Kondratovska
Yana's sister	Vira Kobzar
Seryoga	Yuriy Tkach
Court security guard	Maxim Pankiv
The guy at McDonald's	Alexander Nevzorov
Zhorik	Danilo Oskin
Neighbour	Olena Kravets

== Production ==
The film was originally shot in Russian and later dubbed into Ukrainian. During the premiere press conference of the producers, Volodymyr Zelenskyy assured journalists that "initially the script of the film was written in Ukrainian" and only "later it had to be translated into Russian for Lithuanian actress Agnė Grudytė who was to play the lead role of Yana and who did not speak Ukrainian". At the last minute, Grudytė refused to participate in the film. The role of Yana was then cast with Ukrainian actress Anastasiya Korotkaya, but the movie was still produced in Russian. Filming took place in late summer 2018 in the Ukrainian cities of Kyiv and Lviv.

== Budget ==
The project became one of the winners of the 10th State Cinema Competition. The total cost of the film was set at ₴36.9 million (approx. US$1.3 million). The film was shot with the support of the State Cinema and 49% of the film's budget was financed by the state.

== Release ==
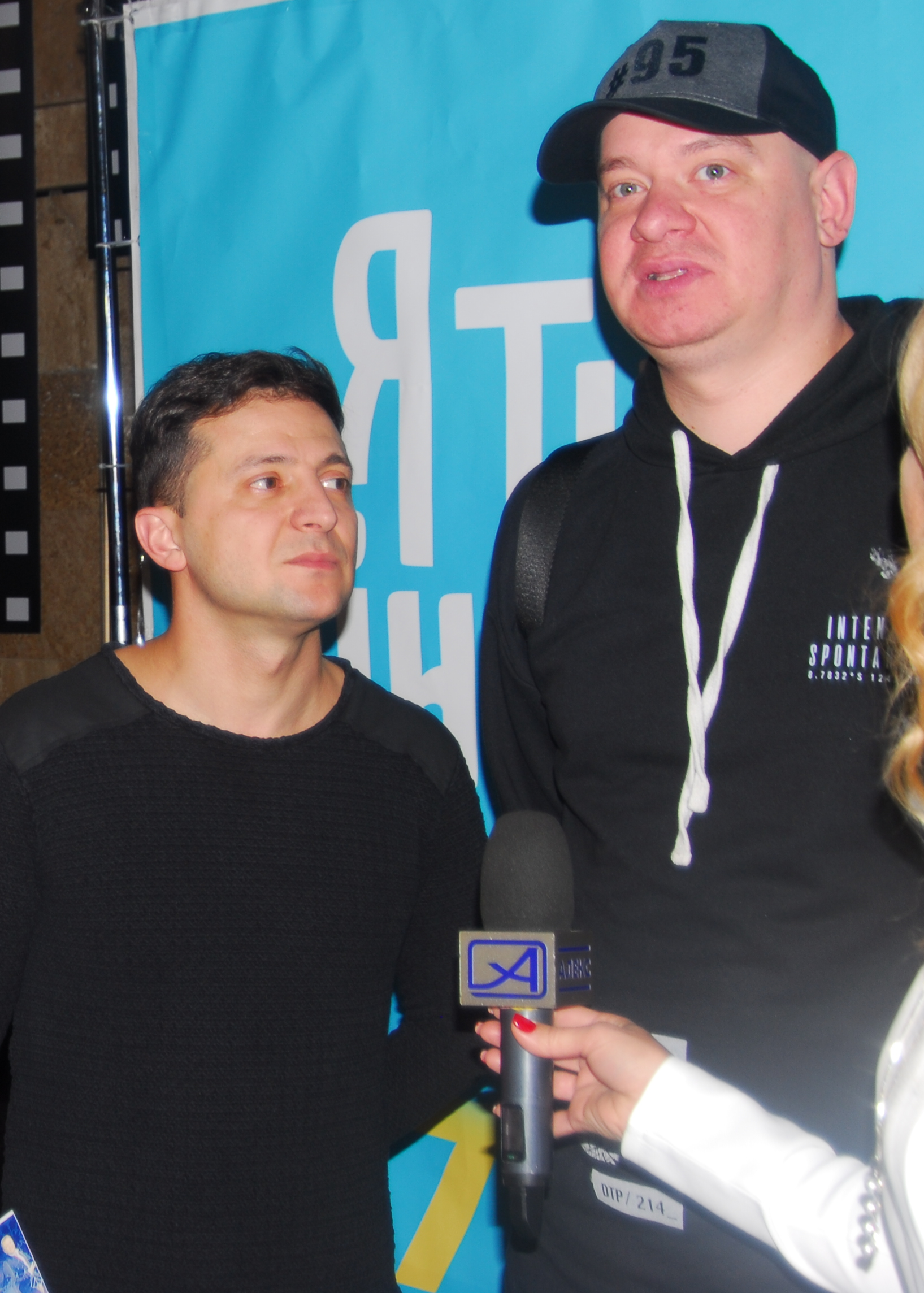
Yevhen Koshovyi and Volodymyr Zelenskyy at the premiere of the film

The film premiered in Ukraine on December 27, 2018, and achieved a record in the collection of Ukrainian films, raising more than ₴71 million (approx. US$2.5 million). The film was watched by almost 800,000 viewers and was also released abroad. In Kazakhstan the tape was released on January 10, 2019, in Latvia on January 11, 2019, under the title "Es, tu, viņš, viņa", in Lithuania on January 11, 2019, under the title "Aš, tu, jis ir ji" and in Estonia on January 18, 2019, under the title "Lahuta, et armastada".

In March 2019, the film became available with Ukrainian dubbing on the VOD platform Megogo. Later, on April 17, the premiere of the film with Ukrainian dubbing took place on television on the 1 + 1 TV channel. After that, on April 18, 2019, the creators released a film with Ukrainian dubbing in the public domain on the platform "1 + 1 video".

== Reviews ==
The film received negative reviews from some Ukrainian viewers and critics due to the fact that, contrary to the promises of the head of Kvartal 95 Studio, Volodymyr Zelenskyy, the film was shot not in Ukrainian but in Russian, and dubbed into Ukrainian only in post-production.
