= Quarter 95 =

Quarter 95, 95th Quarter, or Kvartal 95 may refer to:

- Quarter 95, a public square in Kryvyi Rih, Ukraine
- Kvartal 95 Studio, a television entertainment production company, Ukraine
- Kvartal 95 (KVN), a KVN team, Kryvyi Rih, Ukraine
