= Alexander Pikalov =

Alexander Pikalov may refer to:

- Oleksandr Pikalov, a Ukrainian comedian from Kvartal 95 Studio
- Oleksandr Pikalov (footballer), a Ukrainian football player who scored goals in the 1992 Ukrainian Transitional League
- Alexander Pikalov (swimmer), a Russian Paralympic swimmer
