= Servant of the People (2015 TV series) =

Ukrainian television series

- Genre: Political satire Comedy
- Created by: Volodymyr Zelenskyy
- Starring: Volodymyr Zelenskyy; Stanislav Boklan; Olena Kravets; Jury Krapov; Mykhailo Fatalov; Oleksandr Pikalov; Yevhen Koshovyi; Viktor Saraykin; Natalia Sumska; Kateryna Kisten
- Theme music composer: Dmytro Shurov
- Composer: Andriy Kiryuschenko
- Country of origin: Ukraine
- Original languages: Russian; Ukrainian
- No. of seasons: 3
- No. of episodes: 51

Production
- Executive producer: Volodymyr Zelenskyy
- Producers: Volodymyr Zelenskyy; Andriy Yakovlev; Boris Schefir; Aleksey Kiryushenko
- Production locations: Kyiv, Ukraine
- Running time: 40–90 minutes
- Production company: Kvartal 95

Original release
- Network: 1+1
- Release: 16 November 2015 – 28 March 2019

Servant of the People (Note: Ukrainian: Слуга Народу, romanized: Sluha Narodu, IPA: [sɫuˈɦɑ nɐˈrɔdʊ]) is a Ukrainian political satire comedy series created and produced by Volodymyr Zelenskyy. Zelenskyy stars as Vasyl Petrovych Holoborodko, a high school history teacher in his thirties, who was unexpectedly elected president of Ukraine after finding instant fame when a student recorded a video of him delivering a profane rant against government corruption in his country and uploaded it to the internet. The series ran for three seasons between 2015 and 2019, and a film adaptation was released in 2016. The series was produced by Kvartal 95, a studio founded by Zelenskyy.

In 2018, the studio became involved in Ukrainian politics when a political party of the same name as the show was registered. While this was initially done to prevent others from using the name for "cynical political purposes", it quickly became active in Ukrainian politics, with Zelenskyy running as its candidate in the real-life 2019 Ukrainian presidential election against the incumbent Petro Poroshenko. Zelenskyy was elected president following a landslide victory in the second round election, winning 73% of the vote. He was sworn in as the president of Ukraine on 20 May 2019.

== Plot ==
Vasyl Petrovych Holoborodko (played by Volodymyr Zelenskyy) is a high school history teacher who rises to political prominence after a video of his outburst against government corruption goes viral. Without his knowledge, his students organize a crowdfunding campaign that secures his candidacy in Ukraine's presidential election, resulting in his victory.

Upon taking office, he is unprepared for the demands of political power. He rejects the traditional privileges of his position, choosing to live modestly and continuing to travel utilizing various forms of public transport. He works with a small team of initially skeptical but gradually loyal advisers to push reforms.

As President, Holoborodko confronts systemic corruption and oligarchic influence. He dismisses bodyguards, declines bribes, and objects when his family tries to exploit his new position for personal gain. He also exposes a corrupt prime minister by revealing a black ledger detailing insider transactions during a televised debate. Dream sequences and hallucinations of historical figures such as Abraham Lincoln and Che Guevara guide him on his journey.

Later seasons develop into ensemble narratives, showing Holoborodko and his cabinet navigating bureaucratic resistance, securing IMF support, and passing legislation against corruption.

== Cast and characters ==
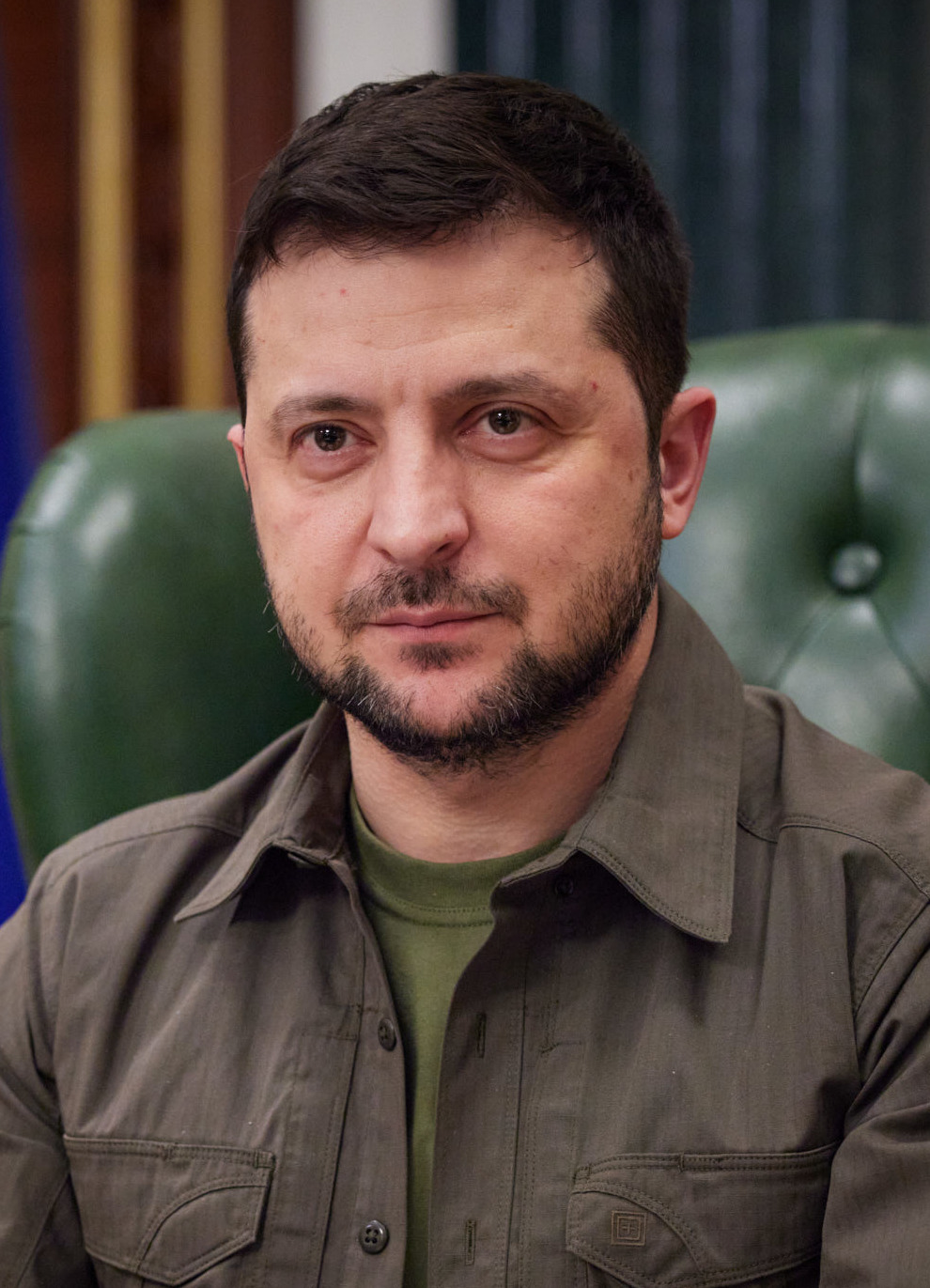
Volodymyr Zelenskyy, the current President of Ukraine, portrayed President Vasyl Holoborodko and Grisha in the series

| Actors | Role(s) | Note | Seasons | | |
| Actors | Role(s) | Note | 1 (2015) | 2 (2017) | 3 (2019) |
|---|---|---|---|---|---|
| Volodymyr Zelenskyy | Vasyl Petrovych Holoborodko, Grisha | A high school history teacher in his thirties who is unexpectedly elected president of Ukraine following a rant against government corruption in his country being secretly filmed by one of his students and going viral. Zelenskyy also portrays Grisha, a government employee who underwent plastic surgery to serve as Holoborodko's body double. | Main | Main | Main |
| Stanislav Boklan | Yuriy Ivanovych Chuiko | A corrupt politician who serves as the prime minister of Ukraine and is later exposed as an ally of the oligarchs | Main | Main | Main |
| Yevhen Koshovyi | Serhiy Viktorovych Mukhin | The minister of foreign affairs of Ukraine and a former actor | Main | Main | Main |
| Olena Kravets | Olha Yuriyivna Mishchenko | Vasyl's ex-wife; the director of the National Bank of Ukraine and later acting Prime Minister | Main | Main | Main |
| Yury Krapov | Mykhaylo Ivanovych Sanin | The minister of fiscal affairs of Ukraine. | Main | Main | Main |
| Mykhailo Fatalov | Mikhail Ashotovich Tasunyan | The head of the Security Service of Ukraine (SBU) | Main | Main | Main |
| Oleksandr Pikalov | Ivan Andriyovych Skoryk | The minister of defence of Ukraine and a former navy captain | Main | Main | Main |
| Viktor Saraykin | Petro Vasylyovych Holoborodko | Vasyl's father | Main | Main | Main |
| Kateryna Kisten | Svitlana Petrivna Sakhno | Vasyl's sister and briefly first deputy of the Ukrainian tax service | Main | Main | Main |
| Nataliya Sumska | Mariya Stefanivna Holoborodko | Vasyl's mother | Main | Minor | |
| Olha Zhukovtsova-Kyiashko | Oksana Skovoroda | Mukhin's secretary | Minor | Main | Main |
| Heorhiy Povolotskyy | Tolya | The Chief of Security and a bodyguard in Vasyl's security detail, dismissed after Vasyl decides his security is excessive | Minor | Main | Main |
| Dmytro Surzhykov | Dmytro Vasylyovych Surikov | Prime Minister of Ukraine, former chairman of the supervisory board of the National Bank | Minor | Main | Main |
| Halyna Bezruk (Season 1); Anastasia Chepelyuk (Season 2) | Anna Mykhailivna | The General Adviser to the President, formerly from the Development Department, and Vasyl's mistress, who is later exposed as an ally of the oligarchs | | | |
| Anna Koshmal | Natasha Sakhno | The President's niece | | | |
| Valentyna Ishchenko | Bella Rudolfivna | The President's secretary | | | |
| Stepan Kazanin | Speechwriter | The President's assistant/speechwriter | | | |

=== Minor roles ===
| Actor / actress | Role | Note |
|---|---|---|
| Oleksiy Kiryushchenko | Serhiy Pavlovych | Former president |
| Tetyana Pechonkina | Nina Yehorivna Tretyak | Vasyl's teacher in school, briefly head of the SBU |
| Yuriy Hrebelnyk | Plato | |
| Oleksiy Vertinsky | Sergey Susseldorf | Designer (Episode 5) / Louis XVI (Episode 20) |
| Oleh Maslennykov | Oligarch | Oligarch |
| Olena Bondareva-Repina | Raisa Andriivna | School principal |
| Oleksiy Smolka | Serhiy Leonidovych Karasyuk | Leader of a faction |
| Anastasiya Karpenko | Yana Klymenko | Opposition journalist |
| Mykhailo August | Andriy Volodymyrovych Yakovlev | Minister of Culture |
| Danilo Oskin | Mykhailo Semenovych | Oligarch |
| Vitaliy Ivanchenko | Vitalii Romanchenko | MP from the Dobrobut faction |
| Rinat Khabibulin | Dima | Vasyl's son |
| Oleksandr Danylchenko | Nikolay Pavlovych Pylypenko | Chief of the Housing and Maintenance Office (ZhEK) |
| Alexander Ignatusha | Judge/Monk Sebastian | Judge/Monk |
| Nazar Zadniprovskyy | Nazar Dobryvechir | Mayor of Zaporizhzhia |
| Andriy Romaniy | | Political talk show host |
| Dmytro Melenevsky | | Karasyuk's bodyguard |
| Andriy Danylko | Verka Serduchka | Ukrainian pop singer |
| Darya Pitsul | | Journalist |

== Episodes ==
=== Series overview ===
| Season | Episodes | Originally released | |
| Season | Episodes | First released | Last released |
|---|---|---|---|
| 1 | 24 | November 16, 2015 | December 9, 2015 |
| 2 | 24 | October 23, 2017 | November 16, 2017 |
| 3 | 3 | March 27, 2019 | March 28, 2019 |

=== Season 1 ===
| No. overall | No. in season | Original release date |
|---|---|---|
| 1 | 1 | November 16, 2015 |
| 2 | 2 | November 16, 2015 |
History teacher Vasyl Petrovich Holoborodko is informed that he has been elected president of Ukraine. The episode switches between his first days as president and flashbacks to the events which led to his election. After one of his students filmed and uploaded Vasyl's profanity-filled rant to YouTube, a crowdfunded campaign raised enough money for him to run for president.
| 3 | 3 | November 17, 2015 |
Waking up as president of Ukraine, Holoborodko sees his family members begin to serve him. His sister does not know that he is the new president of Ukraine. Meanwhile, the oligarchs begin collecting information about Vasyl Holoborodko.
| 4 | 4 | November 17, 2015 |
Vasyl prepares for the inauguration. He is assisted by a speechwriter. The ex-boyfriend of Vasyl's niece returns to her along with his family. He wants to restart their relationship since she is now a relative of the president.
| 5 | 5 | November 18, 2015 |
The president's first day at work begins with a trip to work in a minibus. The prime minister also goes with him. Vasyl's father makes several expensive purchases.
| 6 | 6 | November 18, 2015 |
Vasyl's family renovates their apartment for free and dreams of moving to Mezhyhirya. Holoborodko meets with officials and visits the Verkhovna Rada. He imagines the ghost of Che Guevara, who calls for radical measures.
| 7 | 7 | November 19, 2015 |
By the order of Vasyl, all deputies must leave the city center and move to work in buildings on the outskirts of the capital. Officials are also directed to come to work on bicycles instead of in expensive cars.
| 8 | 8 | November 19, 2015 |
Holding an open competition for ministerial positions turns out to be a big mistake. Vasyl decides to offer positions to trusted people whom he knows personally. However, it is uncertain whether the deputies will support their candidacies.
| 9 | 9 | November 23, 2015 |
Ministers of Holoborodko's team have a difficult first working day. Many in the Cabinet want to frame them. The worst affected is the head of the Security Service of Ukraine, who has a chemical substance poured in her tea.
| 10 | 10 | November 23, 2015 |
Holoborodko is shocked by what happens to the head of the SBU and intends to figure it all out. Meanwhile, his team receives eye-catching offers from the "strong people". The oligarchs are trying to bribe the ministers behind the president's back.
| 11 | 11 | November 24, 2015 |
Vasyl's ministers decide to take the bribes, and some ask for more money. At the same time, the prime minister is happy to connect profits from farmers, but the state employees get what is left.
| 12 | 12 | November 24, 2015 |
Holoborodko introduces tax reforms which include an interest rate cut, as well as a simplified tax payment scheme. In order to explain his intentions to the people, the president wants to use the resources of the Ministry of Culture. He asks to shoot a commercial, which will show all the advantages of the reform.
| 13 | 13 | November 25, 2015 |
Holoborodko's tax reforms affect his family—namely his father. Meanwhile, the head of the Fiscal Service begins to investigate officials. He finds out that all of their income is illegally registered to family members and spouses.
| 14 | 14 | November 25, 2015 |
Thanks to Anatoliy's wife's agreements, the president decides to use the services of a security guard. The head of the fiscal service speaks with the relatives of the wealthiest officials. This leads to a high-profile case and forces the oligarchs to move.
| 15 | 15 | November 26, 2015 |
The president's sister is trying to get into the Cabinet and take a high position, but the ministers refuse to accept her to their departments. When some funds appear in the budget, Holoborodko decides to allow them to repair Kyiv's roads.
| 16 | 16 | November 26, 2015 |
All the failures of the president and his team are leaked to the media. One call causes a storm of dissatisfied people. Trained people that do not want to lose their seats begin working on this crisis of public perception.
| 17 | 17 | November 30, 2015 |
Having launched several reforms, Holoborodko declares war on the oligarchs. The president is now under surveillance, as subordinates of the oligarchs attempt to find any potential scandals in the life of the president in an attempt to humiliate and compromise him; however, they have little success.
| 18 | 18 | December 1, 2015 |
There are difficulties in finding a decent person for the post of head of the State Agency of Automobile Roads of Ukraine. For years it was occupied by people that plundered one of the most important structures in the state's apparatus. Holoborodko is fed up by this.
| 19 | 19 | December 2, 2015 |
Holoborodko tries everything to eradicate corruption. He receives a call from German chancellor Angela Merkel, who tells him his nation has been accepted into the European Union. She then corrects herself, saying that this message had actually been meant for the president of Montenegro.
| 20 | 20 | December 3, 2015 |
The president suggests that the "strong ones of this world" file real tax returns with the right number of zeros. Holoborodko continues to press the oligarchs, making them go rabid. The caste of oligarchs tries to influence Holoborodko in every possible way, but he doesn't give up.
| 21 | 21 | December 7, 2015 |
Holoborodko's reforms are unpopular not only with the people, but also with the "three whales" who are trying to take power. They try to negotiate with the newly minted president, but nothing happens.
| 22 | 22 | December 8, 2015 |
The president needs to repay his debts to the IMF. He resorts to unpopular measures—tough reform. These policies sow panic among the people.
| 23 | 23 | December 9, 2015 |
The president, as a guest on a political talk show, talks about reforming Ukraine's judicial system. With Holoborodko's submission, the former head of the Sanitary and Epidemiological Station of Kyiv conducts an audit right at home. They show the wonderful life that the official leads with his family.
| 24 | 24 | December 9, 2015 |
The end of the first 100 days of Holoborodko's presidency arrives. His actions lead to progress, and changes in government become noticeable. The president was able to identify those problems and carry out reforms. Anatoliy saves the president from an assassination attempt. He and his family, minister friends, and lover Anna Mikhailovna have a family dinner.

=== Season 2: From Love to Impeachment ===
| No. overall | No. in season | Original release date |
|---|---|---|
| 25 | 1 | October 23, 2017 |
| 26 | 2 | October 23, 2017 |
Holoborodko wakes up in a cold sweat after dreaming he was betrayed by his best friends. After recovering a little, he quickly calms down, telling himself that it is just a dream, but in reality it is the president's birthday. Watching the news, Holoborodko suddenly realizes that there will be no festivities, because there was a coup d'état in the country. This turns out to be a prank by his friends.
| 27 | 3 | October 24, 2017 |
After the president's unforgettable birthday, all his friends gather for an important meeting in his office. On the agenda: the lack of evidence against Yurii Ivanovich, as banks in all countries in which he withdrew money refuse to cooperate with the investigation. Suddenly, the meeting is interrupted by the visit of Yurii Ivanovich himself, who was brought to Holoborodko's office for an investigative experiment.
| 28 | 4 | October 24, 2017 |
The day comes when visa-free travel is approved for Ukrainian citizens and the president is initially most pleased with the news. However, leaving home in the morning, Vasily does not see a soul and soon realizes that all Ukrainians have left their homeland in search of a better fate in the West, and only he remains as a true patriot of his country. This turns out to be a vision of what the president worries could become of Ukraine.
| 29 | 5 | October 25, 2017 |
After the meeting of the Cabinet of Ministers, the president realizes that the time has come for change, and goes to the Department of Development, which has long had a plan "to realize the dream of a successful and self-sufficient Ukraine". Simultaneously, the trial of Yurii Ivanovich continues, and an incorruptible judge will announce his verdict.
| 30 | 6 | October 25, 2017 |
It is a historic day for the Ukraine, as the parliament must vote for a new prime minister. Since the oligarchs cannot decide on a single candidate for the post, they launch a series of stories about the president and his entourage on TV, so that he does not get ahead of his candidate.
| 31 | 7 | October 26, 2017 |
The global crisis has affected the IMF, so only one country in Eastern Europe will receive a loan: Ukraine or Greece. But to do so, the countries must show their tough stance on corruption. The Greeks decide to imprison their oligarchs. Since Ukraine needed a higher profile figure, the local oligarchs decide to arrest their most corrupt official, who turns out to be the former president.
| 32 | 8 | October 26, 2017 |
In order to receive a loan from the IMF, Ukraine must fulfill the mandatory conditions and adopt a whole package of anti-corruption laws, for which Verkhovna Rada deputies refuse to vote. The president has only two days to persuade deputies to vote for the necessary laws for the country.
| 33 | 9 | October 30, 2017 |
After the president's visit to Yurii Ivanovich in "places not so far away", Holoborodko makes a proposal so that the former prime minister cannot refuse and agrees to testify against the oligarchs in court.
| 34 | 10 | October 30, 2017 |
A delegation from the IMF arrives in Lviv to sign a final loan agreement. The Rada voted for the necessary laws for Ukraine, and all that is left is the personal presence of the president, who decides not to go to Lviv.
| 35 | 11 | October 31, 2017 |
To quarrel with the oligarchs and get the coveted loan, Holoborodko goes to Kharkiv to meet the governor to persuade him to change Roizman's bank to Mamatov's bank. The meeting does not yield the desired result, and the president again goes to Yurii Ivanovich, who has a contingency plan.
| 36 | 12 | October 31, 2017 |
Instead of the promised visit to Sumy, the president goes to Zaporizhzhia and reveals a number of corruption schemes to the press, after which he thanks journalist Serhiy Biryukov, who works for Roizman. The oligarchs understand that all these events are not accidental, and promise to arrange a "warm welcome" to Vasily Petrovich in Zaporizhzhia.
| 37 | 13 | November 1, 2017 |
Holoborodko continues to reveal the schemes of the oligarchs, creating new problems for them. They "bite" each other, revoking the license of one of the TV channels and causing the failure of privatized mobile operators and banking systems. Ukraine falls into a global crisis, but turns out to be a dream. Titushky—incited by Mamatov—chases the president and Chuiko throughoit Zaporizhzhia. During the chase, Holoborodko and Chuiko change into the costumes of Verka Serduchka and his group and Holoborodko throws cakes at the pursuers.
| 38 | 14 | November 1, 2017 |
Yurii Ivanovich finds his long-awaited freedom by fulfilling his obligations to the president. Holoborodko meets with the IMF delegation in Lviv to accept its demands, but when he hears what the commission is demanding from Ukraine, the latter is told to "go to hell", causing international controversy.
| 39 | 15 | November 2, 2017 |
Due to the president's insults, the IMF refuses to give the 15 billion dollar loan, and Ukraine risks its reputation on the international stage. To overcome the crisis, the president proposes his man for the post of prime minister, while lightly blackmailing the main figures of the Verkhovna Rada.
| 40 | 16 | November 2, 2017 |
The oligarchs want to get rid of the unwanted president as soon as possible and with the fewest losses for themselves. At the general council, they decide to arrange an impeachment for Holoborodko by searching for Yurii Ivanovich. The president strikes back and the special services arrest Roizman.
| 41 | 17 | November 6, 2017 |
The president announces that he is resigning, and Dmytro Surikov becomes prime minister. The chairman of the SBU and the minister of Foreign Affairs also want to resign from office. Holoborodko's family tries to help him out of his depression. The pre-election struggle for the chair of the head of the country begins, and a man dressed up as a bee runs for president.
| 42 | 18 | November 7, 2017 |
The struggle for the presidency is in full swing, and the deputies are shooting election campaign videos. Holoborodko decides to go to the polls, but due to a lack of campaign funding, no bank will give a loan of two million hryvnias.
| 43 | 19 | November 8, 2017 |
The new race has just begun, and the situation for Holoborod'ko is already quite difficult because he does not have the popular support he had before, and according to the results of the polls, he is sitting in last place. Vasily Petrovich understands that he cannot do well without the help of a good political strategist, for whom he would need to allocate at least one million dollars. But where can he get one?
| 44 | 20 | November 9, 2017 |
Nestor Dyachenko is a candidate who believes only in God, and the oligarchs cannot understand who sponsors him. The struggle amongst the candidates also begins at a religious level. Meanwhile, Holoborodko shoots another commercial and prepares for the debate. However, the money for the campaign suddenly disappears.
| 45 | 21 | November 13, 2017 |
Holoborodko has invested the money from the election campaign into an innovation – a pedestrian crossing with illumination. It turns out that this act raised him to first place. Nazar Dobryivecher plans to arrange a fight with Holoborodko, but Vasily does not appear at the debate, and the latter clings to Khodobyak, resulting in a fight. Holoborodko's act only goes to benefit.
| 46 | 22 | November 14, 2017 |
Surikov has found compromising material on the presidential candidates and wants to cooperate with Holoborodko. At the debate, Vasily exposes those who financed the campaigns of Karasyuk, Khudobyak, Dobryivecher, and Borisenko. The oligarchs look for new ways to lower Holoborodko's ratings. They nominate a new person for the job – a "common man from the people", Dr. Tyshchenko, to go against Holoborodko. Vasily is accused of being Nemchuk's project (with the help of a plot involving his body double Grisha).
| 47 | 23 | November 15, 2017 |
The oligarchs' scam uncovers. Mamatov is arrested on charges of plotting the murder of Holoborodko. Borisenko withdraws from the election in favor of Karasyuk. Surikov presents Nemchuk with a compromise on the latter, and as a result, Karasyuk also withdraws from the election, casting his votes in favor of Surikov. Surikov resumes negotiations with the IMF on a loan and succeeds, which wins the support of voters.
| 48 | 24 | November 16, 2017 |
Olya tries to find evidence on Surikov, but fails. Suddenly, Nemchuk comes to the rescue in this matter, throwing compromising information on the air about the terms of the deal with the IMF. Two days before the elections, a debate between Holoborod'ko and Surikov is planned to be held on the TV show "Dialoga". The latter is not at the debate, but his representative comes out – Yurii Ivanovich, who tells the truth about his salvation, thereby exposing Holoborodko as a criminal in the eyes of the public. He later admits that the former president was sympathetic to him, and explains to the audience the truth about what prompted Holoborodko to commit an official crime. According to the results of the elections, Surikov is leading with a result almost twice as high as the result of Holoborodko. But the people do not believe the results of the elections.

=== Season 3: Choice ===
| No. overall | No. in season | Original release date |
|---|---|---|
| 49 | 1 | March 27, 2019 |
The season begins 30 years into the future in a history lesson, where a young teacher tells his students how Holoborodko saved Ukraine from oligarchs and led it to prosperity. Vasyl Holoborodko is in prison, while Dmytro Surikov is in power. The new president is organizing a grandiose scam to buy coal from South Africa and flies to the Maldives. People, having learned about this, go to protests, but they are dispersed. Surikov's colleagues betray him. The "Milk Revolution" begins. Meanwhile, Holoborodko's friends and previous ministers are appealing to the EU to free Holoborodko.
| 50 | 2 | March 27, 2019 |
After the "Milk Revolution", Zhanna Borysenko becomes president of Ukraine, but her promises to both oligarchs and ordinary Ukrainians turn out to be false. After a series of Maidians, authorities eventually move to the "Military-Nationalist State" headed by Boryslav Kostyuk, but this also ends in failure. Each region of Ukraine becomes a separate quasi-state.
| 51 | 3 | March 28, 2019 |
Vasyl Holoborodko remains the only person who has proved the possibility of positive change. He is elected president again and must meet the expectations of the people. Holoborodko finds himself on the imaginary "court" of the former rulers of Ukraine, where he understands what he should do. But to do this, he would have to talk to the rulers of all 28 Ukrainian quasi-states. Ukraine eventually becomes a utopia: oligarchs are curbed by the sale of criminal cases against them at auctions; the language issue is resolved by simultaneous interpreters; regions are connected with "eternal" concrete roads. All Ukrainians share savings, making a huge pile of gold on Independence Square, which helps realize the dream of Ukraine of never becoming a third-world country again.

== Development ==
=== Production ===
- Concept: Volodymyr Zelenskyy, Andriy Yakovlev, Oleksiy Kiryushchenko, Serhiy Shefir, Borys Shefir
- Scriptwriters: Andriy Yakovlev, Oleksiy Kiryushchenko, Yuriy Kostyuk, Yuriy Mykulenko, Dmytro Hryhorenko, Mykhailo Savin, Dmytro Kozlov, Oleksandr Bragin
- Directed by: Oleksiy Kiryushchenko
- Cinematographer: Serhiy Koshel
- Production designer: Vadim Shinkaryov
- Composer: Andriy Kiryushchenko
- Soundtrack: Dmitry Shurov, Potap, and Nastya
- Make-up artist: Nina Kremeshna-Lavrinenko
- Costume designer: Veronika Yatsenko
- Executive producer: Victor Yarish
- Creative producer: Yuri Kostyuk
- Producers: Volodymyr Zelenskyy, Borys Shefir, Serhiy Shefir, Andriy Yakovlev, Oleksiy Kiryushchenko

== Release ==
Servant of the People originally aired on the 1+1 channel in Ukraine. with all episodes being posted for free on YouTube. Select countries would later receive the first season on Netflix in 2017. However, in 2021, Netflix lost licensing rights. In March 2022, following the Russian invasion of Ukraine, Netflix re-licensed the first season, and in May 2022, added the second and third seasons for over 33 countries. The Netflix release combines the first two episodes into one in both seasons one and two, resulting in 23 episodes instead of 24 for both seasons.

Belarusian TV channel Belarus-1 began broadcasting the show in evening prime time on November 11, 2019. The Russian channel TNT aired the pilot episode of the show's first series on December 11, 2019, claiming it did so as "a marketing move to raise awareness of the platform". TNT cut a scene from the episode in which president-elect Holoborod'ko asked if Russian President Vladimir Putin wore a Hublot watch, a joke referring to a well-known anti-Putin chant in Ukraine, and stopped airing the show after a day.

In the United States, HITN presents the series in a Spanish-language version. Jewish Life Television carries the series in its original Russian and Ukrainian languages, with English subtitles.

=== Sequels ===
A film adaptation of the series, Servant of the People 2, was released in 2016. The second season utilized footage from the film to expand on its plot and was released in 2017, bringing the movie into the series' main continuity.

== Impact ==
=== 2019 ===
Zelenskyy would later mirror his character's rise to political power by being elected President of Ukraine in 2019. After his victory was announced, Zelenskyy walked onto the stage at his campaign headquarters with the show's theme playing.

=== 2022 ===
In the wake of the 2022 Russian invasion of Ukraine and Zelenskyy's wartime leadership, the show's popularity received a notable boost. Broadcasting rights have been requested by various foreign companies. On March 16, Netflix announced that season 1 of the series would be available to US streamers again due to popular demand. On May 16, Netflix added the 2nd and 3rd seasons.

== Broadcasting rights ==
In 2022, Zelenskyy, serving as president during the Russian invasion of Ukraine, received international attention, which corresponded with increased interest in the series.

- Albania: Tring TV (14 March 2022 – ), TV Klan (19 April 2022 – )
- Australia: Special Broadcasting Service (28 February 2022 - 28 February 2023)
- Belarus: Belarus-1 (11 November 2019 – )
- Brazil: HBO Max
- Bulgaria: NOVA (18 April 2022 – )
- Canada: Vision TV (5 April 2022 – )
- Estonia: TV3 (5 April 2022 – ), TV3+ (1 April 2022 – )
- Finland: Yle
- France: ARTE (November 2021 on ARTE.tv, 8 April 2022 on ARTE), 6play from M6 (March 2022)
- Georgia: Not announced yet
- Germany: ARTE
- Greece: ANT1 (7 March 2022 – 12 April 2022) (Cancelled after Season 1 due to low ratings; low ratings existed since premiere)
- Hungary: RTL (20 March 2022 – 19 November 2022)
- Italy: La7 (4 April 2022 – )
- Kosovo: Kohavision (31 March 2022 – )
- Latin America: Netflix and HBO Max
- Latvia: TV3 (28 March 2022 – 6 May 2022)
- Lithuania: TV3 (21 March 2022 – ), TV6 (April 2022 – )
- Middle East: MBC
- Moldova: Jurnal TV
- North Macedonia: Kanal 5
- Portugal: Netflix
- Romania: Pro TV
- Russia: TNT (only the pilot episode), Kinopoisk
- Serbia: Nova S (21 September 2019 – )
- Slovakia: Markíza (28 March 2022), Dajto (2 April 2022 – )
- Slovenia: Voyo (17 April 2022 – )
- Spain: Telecinco (14 April 2022 – )
- Sweden: SVT
- Tunisia: Hannibal TV
- Turkey: Not announced yet
- Ukraine: 1+1
- United Kingdom: Channel 4 (6 March 2022 – 3 March 2025)
- United States: HITN - Spanish-language (April 2022), JLTV (19 September 2022 – )
- Vietnam: K+ (22 February 2022 – ), SCTN (04 September 2023 – )
- In some countries: Netflix

== Remakes ==
An American remake of Servant of the People was ordered by Hulu, with British writer Simon Farnaby involved in its development, but the show was later shelved. After the premiere of the original show, the rights to create a Poland-based remake were bought by Okil Khamidov; however, no film studios showed interest. In 2022, in the wake of the Russian invasion of Ukraine and Zelenskyy's wartime leadership, the popularity of the original show increased internationally, causing Polsat, a Polish television network, to express interest in the remake's creation and to begin its production. This show, also titled Servant of the People, premiered on 4 March 2023. It was created by Khamidov, directed by Khamidov and Maciej Bieliński, produced by Polot Media, and distributed by Polsat. It currently features one season of 24 episodes, with a second season in production. Khamidov sent the first episode of the series to Volodymyr Zelenskyy, who reportedly approved of it.

== See also ==
- Man of the Year (2006), American film with a similar concept, starring Robin Williams as a talk show host who is elected president following an offhanded remark.
- Welcome Mr. President (2013), Italian film with similar concept, starring Claudio Bisio as a librarian who is elected president due to a joke vote.
- Mudhalvan (1999) and Nayak: The Real Hero (2001), Indian political action films in which a TV journalist is challenged to take over the Chief Minister's job for a day.
