= Servant of the People 2 =

2016 Ukrainian film

- Theatrical release poster
- Directed by: Aleksey Kiryushchenko
- Based on: Servant of the People by Volodymyr Zelenskyy
- Produced by: Aleksey Kiryushchenko; Boris Shefir; Sergey Shefir; Andrey Yakovlev; Volodymyr Zelenskyy
- Starring: Volodymyr Zelenskyy; Yevhen Koshovyi; Stanislav Boklan; Anastasia Chepelyuk
- Cinematography: Alexander Glinchenko; Sergey Koshel (as Sergiy Koshel)
- Music by: Andrey Kirushenko
- Production company: Kvartal 95 Studio
- Distributed by: UFD
- Release date: December 23, 2016 (Ukraine)
- Running time: 100 minutes
- Country: Ukraine
- Languages: Russian; Ukrainian
- Box office: ₴23.7 million ($0.88 million USD) (Ukraine)

Servant of the People 2 (Ukrainian: «Слуга народу 2», romanized: Sluha narodu 2, Russian: «Слуга народа 2», romanized: Sluga naroda 2) is a 2016 Ukrainian political comedy film based on Volodymyr Zelenskyy's television series Servant of the People, produced and distributed by Kvartal 95 Studio, which also produced the series. The film was directed by Aleksey Kiryushchenko and stars Zelenskyy, who also served as a producer of the film, alongside Anastasia Chepelyuk and returning cast members Yevhen Koshovyi and Stanislav Boklan. Released between the first and second seasons of Servant of the People, the film follows the efforts of President Vasily Goloborodko (Zelenskyy) to overcome a group of adversarial oligarchs and pass political reforms in order to make Ukraine eligible for IMF financial aid.

Zelenskyy's role in both the TV series and the film is credited with helping him win the vote in the 2019 Ukrainian presidential election.

== Plot ==
President of Ukraine Vasily Petrovych Goloborodko's proposed reforms, a condition for Ukraine to receive a loan from the International Monetary Fund (IMF), are rejected by the Verkhovna Rada, the Ukrainian parliament. The oligarchs Mamatov, Nimchuk and Roizman, who control the parliamentary factions, offer to pass the reforms if they are able to appoint their puppet as prime minister, a deal which Vasily rejects. Vasily visits former prime minister Yuriy Ivanovich Chuiko, who was arrested on corruption charges two months earlier. Yuriy agrees to provide compromising information on the oligarchs in exchange for full amnesty.

The next day, Yuriy is moved out of prison when the prison van is attacked with a bomb. Vasily and Yuriy observe the latter's funeral in Kyiv from a distance. At the Potocki Palace in Lviv, foreign minister Serhiy Viktorovich Mukhin and his assistant Oksana receive the head of the IMF, where Vasily is due to lead negotiations. Yuriy proposes a plan to turn the oligarchs against each other, and tells Vasily his destination is Kharkiv. Serhiy and Oksana distract the head of the IMF.

Vasily is received by the corrupt governor, an associate of Roizman. Vasily pretends to be corrupt and pressures the governor to help Mamatov instead. However, when the governor offers Vasily bribes, he attacks the governor on television. Yuriy saves the situation by advising Vasily to replace the governor with Mamatov's man, causing a rift between the two oligarchs.

Vasily and Yuriy head to Zaporizhzhia, where Vasily reveals the corruption in the oblast and its connection to Mamatov in front of television cameras. While staying at a hotel, the two are attacked by thugs. Vasily and Yuriy disguise themselves by dressing in drag and leading the thugs on a car chase, then leaving on a yacht. With parliament getting ready to elect the prime minister the next day, Vasily learns from Yuriy that if the Verkhovna Rada fails to elect a prime minister within two months, he can dissolve it. He can threaten dissolution to force the parliament to vote for his reforms.

Vasily and Yuriy arrive at Odesa, where Vasily crashes the wedding of Nimchuk's daughter, causing the oligarchs' alliance to collapse. As a result, the Verkhovna Rada fails to elect a prime minister and passes the reforms. Yuriy leaves the country. Vasily arrives at Lviv. However, he finds the IMF terms intolerable, and tears up the agreement.

== Cast ==
- Volodymyr Zelenskyy as Vasily Petrovych Goloborodko, president of Ukraine
- Stanislav Boklan as Yuriy Ivanovich Chuiko, former prime minister
- Yevhen Koshovyi as Serhiy Viktorovich Mukhin, Minister of Foreign Affairs
- Olha Zhukovtsova as Oksana Skovoroda, Mukhin's assistant
- Heorhii Povolotskyy as Tolya, Goloborodko's bodyguard
- Mykhailo Fatalov as Mikhail Ashotovich Tasunyan, head of the Security Service of Ukraine
- Anastasia Chepelyuk as Anna Mikhailovna, Goloborodko's adviser and lover
- Serhii Kalantai as Otto Adelweinsteiner, head of the International Monetary Fund
- Volodymyr Horiansky as Rustem Ashotovych Mamatov, oligarch
- Yurii Hrebelnyk as Andriy Mykolayovych Nimchuk, oligarch
- Dmytro Lalienkov as Mykhailo Roizman, oligarch
- Verka Serduchka as himself

== Production ==
Servant of the People 2 was developed by the film studio Kvartal 95.

Filming began August 13, 2016 and was expected to last two and a half months, with 75 days slated for filming. Filming took place in Kyiv, Kharkiv, Zaporizhia, Odesa and Lviv.

The first day of filming took place at the Central Railway Station in Kyiv. A platform and passenger train were leased for the set. Ukrainian journalists were present at the event, and were invited not only to interview the cast and crew, but also to participate in the filming, playing themselves as the Ukrainian media who were there to interview Zelenskyy's character President Goloborodko.

Both filming of this film and filming of the series's second season were set to occur in the same period of time from between October 3 to 6 in Lviv. While at the announcement of the filming location there had been some threats of protest by activists who had previously accused the series of being Ukrainophobic due to the series's use of the Russian language, as well as both the film studio's and Zelenskyy's involvement in a parody of the Ukrainian government, ultimately there was no interference with the production.

== Release ==
Servant of the People 2 had its premiere in Kyiv on December 19, 2016, and then released widely in Ukraine on December 23, 2016. The film was released in Belarus on April 27, 2017, and was later screened at the Montreal World Film Festival on August 25, 2017.

The television premiere of the film in Ukraine was scheduled to coincide with the Independence Day of Ukraine, on August 24, 2017.

=== Box office ===
In Ukraine, Servant of the People 2 grossed ₴11.3 million ($420,000 USD) on its opening weekend, and has grossed ₴23.7 million ($880,000 USD) overall by the end of 2017.

== Accolades ==
Awards and Nominations
Award	Date of ceremony	Category	Nominee	Result	Ref
Golden Dzyga (Ukrainian Film Academy Awards)	April 20, 2017	Best Movie	Servant of the People 2	Nominated	
Golden Dzyga (Ukrainian Film Academy Awards)	April 20, 2017	Best Actor	Volodymyr Zelenskyy	Nominated	
Golden Dzyga (Ukrainian Film Academy Awards)	April 20, 2017	Best Supporting Actor	Yevhen Koshovyi	Nominated	
Chongqing Pioneer Art Film Festival	November, 2019	Best Foreign Film	Servant of the People 2	Won	
