= Danguolė Rasalaitė =

Lithuanian victim of human trafficking (1983–2000)

- Born: 19 May 1983; Telšiai, Lithuanian SSR, Soviet Union
- Died: 10 January 2000 (aged 16); Malmö, Sweden
- Other name: Kristina (what she called herself during her time in Sweden)
- Known for: Victim of human trafficking, inspiration for the film Lilya 4-ever

Danguolė Rasalaitė (19 May 1983 – 10 January 2000) was a Lithuanian girl who came to Sweden on November 17, 1999, with the belief she would work as a berry picker. However, she was forced into prostitution and held captive in Malmö, Sweden, where in 2000 she took her own life by jumping off of a bridge.

== Early life ==
Danguolė was born in Telšiai but grew up in the Šančiai district of Kaunas. She had an older sister, Jolanta. Her mother, Regina Rasalienė, worked as a shop assistant. Danguolė's father was convicted and sentenced to five years in prison. After that, Regina remarried for a short time, and Danguolė received the surname Rasalaitė from her stepfather.

In early 1997, Regina decided to move to the United States, where she planned to obtain a green card. To do so, she sold their house in Šančiai, and she and her daughter moved to the town of Žiežmariai, where they settled in a one-room apartment intended as temporary housing while waiting for the visa. During this period, Danguolė went to Germany to stay with her sister Jolanta, who was married to a German citizen. There, Danguolė studied at the Lithuanian Gymnasium in Hüttenfeld. Her sister and brother-in-law paid 700 German marks per month for her education.

Before moving to Germany, Danguolė was described as a rather modest girl who studied diligently at school. However, according to relatives, her behavior changed significantly in Germany: she began violating school discipline, which led to complaints from the school administration. As a result, Regina traveled to Germany and brought Danguolė back to Lithuania.

After obtaining a visa, Regina decided to move to the United States alone first, planning for Danguolė to join her after turning 16, when parental consent from Danguolė's father would no longer be required. After her mother’s departure, Danguolė lived for about a year and a half with her aunt Irena Marošienė, her husband Vidmantas, and their son Sergei in Žiežmariai. The family lived in a two-room apartment, which was very cramped, and Danguolė eventually returned to her former apartment.

Following her return from Germany, she struggled to adapt to a local school (Žiežmariai Gymnasium, where her aunt enrolled her) and eventually dropped out, despite her relatives' attempts to persuade her to complete at least nine grades. In October 1998, her relatives enrolled her in a vocational school. However, since Danguolė was living alone and could not be fully supervised, especially after her aunt later emigrated first to England and then to the United States, she soon dropped out again and began leading a chaotic lifestyle. She often did not spend nights at home; neighbors later recalled that she appeared only occasionally to change clothes.

Eventually, her relatives lost contact with her. Danguolė left Žiežmariai and lived with various partners in Kaišiadorys, where she later disappeared.

In the summer of 1999, Regina, by then married for the third time, this time to an American of Yugoslav origin, sent a letter to her daughter stating that she was finally ready to bring her to the United States. In response, Irena's husband wrote back saying that he was unable to locate his niece. Six months later, Danguolė was officially listed as missing.

In the autumn of 1999, Danguolė visited her friend Kristina Ašmenaitė with a young man and persuaded her to lend her passport, as Danguolė did not own one but needed one to go to Sweden. The young man was Danguolė's new boyfriend, who promised her a job on a vegetable farm in Malmö, Sweden.

== In Sweden ==
On November 17, 1999, Danguolė flew to Kristianstad using Kristina Ašmenaitė's passport. She was met there and taken to an apartment in Arlöv. Her passport was taken away, and she was told that she had to repay the cost of her flight, 20,000 Swedish kronor (approximately 2,410 USD at the time) through prostitution.

Her sexual exploitation was accompanied by beatings in cases of disobedience. The apartment was kept locked at all times, and clients were given a key in advance when they arrived. After working in prostitution for a month, Danguolė managed to escape from the apartment through a window and fled to Malmö where she met a man from Skopje, Macedonia who offered her accommodation. During the evening of January 6, 2000, she was gang raped by this man and a group of his friends.

Later that same day, Danguolė was found critically injured on the E22 highway beneath the Krusegatan overpass. The police classified the incident as a suicide, although no witnesses to the jump were found. She was taken to hospital unconscious and died from her injuries on 10 January 2000. She never regained consciousness.

== Aftermath ==
Rasalaitė possessed no passport or other identification, but the police found a piece of paper with two handwritten telephone numbers in one of her pockets. The numbers helped Malmö police find the apartment in Arlöv where she had been confined. Rasalaitė's belongings and three farewell letters to her friends in Lithuania were found in the apartment. The letters indicated she had been betrayed by a man referred to as "the Russian". On April 6, the police questioned this man, Giedrius, who was later described in a radio documentary as being around 30 years old, around 6 ft 5 in (196 cm), muscular, and from Lithuania. On April 13, 2000, he fled Sweden for Lithuania. On May 31, 2000, Giedrius was reported as a suspect in pimping.

== Movie ==
Lukas Moodysson directed the Swedish movie Lilya 4-ever starring the Russian actress Oksana Akinshina, which is based on the fate of Danguolė Rasalaitė.
