= Akinshin =

Akinshin (masculine, Russian: Акиньшин) or Akinshina (feminine, Russian: Акиньшинa) is a patronymic Russian surname created from Russian: Аки́нф, Greek: Υάκινφος. Notable people with the surname include:

- Oksana Akinshina (born 1987), Russian actress
