= Bezruk =

Bezruk (Russian: Безрук) is a Ukrainian surname. People with the last name include:

- Dmytro Bezruk (born 1996), Ukrainian football goalkeeper
- Halyna Bezruk (born 1988), Ukrainian actress and singer
