= Artyom Bogucharsky =

Russian stage, film and television actor

- Born: Artyom Gennadyevich Bogucharsky; 14 August 1989 (age 36); Moscow, Russian SFSR, Soviet Union (present-day Moscow, Russia)
- Occupation: Actor
- Years active: 2002–present

Artyom Gennadyevich Bogucharsky (Russian: Артем Генна́дьевич Богучарский; born 14 August 1989) is a Russian stage, film and television actor who is perhaps best recalled internationally for his role in the 2002 drama, Lilya 4-ever.

== Career ==
Born in Moscow in 1989, he garnered his first role at age 12 as the doomed Volodya, the young friend of an abandoned teenage girl in the 2002 Lukas Moodysson-directed drama Lilya 4-ever. The film received positive reviews. It won five Guldbagge Awards including Best Film and Bogucharsky was nominated as Best Actor. It was nominated for Best Film and Best Actress at the European Film Awards. The film also won several awards from film festivals around the world, including Best Film at the Gijón International Film Festival and the Rouen Nordic Film Festival.

Following his role in Lilya 4-ever, Bogucharsky went on to appear in a number of Russian films and television series. He graduated from the Gnessin State Musical College as a clarinet player. After graduating from the M.S. Schepkin Higher Theatre School in Moscow in 2009, he began appearing in a number of stage roles.

== Selected filmography ==
Year	Title	Role	Notes
2002	Lilya 4-ever	Volodya	
2003-2007	Evlampiya Romanov. The Investigation is Conducted By an Amateur		
2003	Striped Summer	Asisiyay	Mini-series
2004	The Beginning of the Road		
2004-2013	Kulagin and Partners		TV series
2004	Lonely Heaven		TV series
2007–2013	Daddy's Daughters	Sobolev	TV series
2008-2010	Ranetki	Ivan	TV series
2008	Step by Step		TV series
2008	Well		Short film
2011	The Last Chord	Vanya Cherepanov	TV series
2017	Dinosaur		TV series
