= Stanislav Boklan =

Ukrainian actor

- Станіслав Боклан
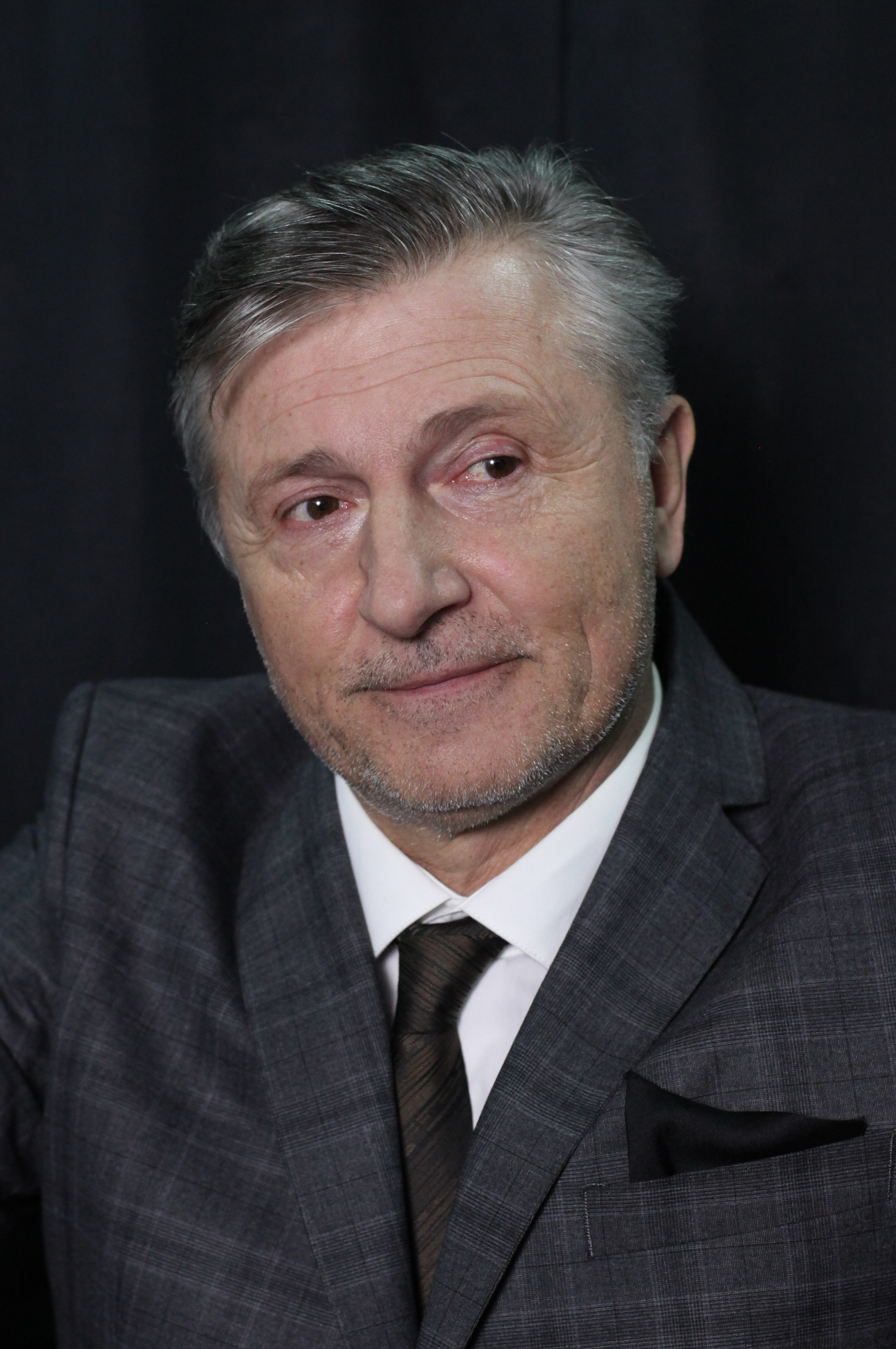
- Boklan in 2016
- Born: 12 January 1960 (age 66); Brusyliv, Zhytomyr Oblast, Ukrainian SSR, Soviet Union
- Education: Kyiv National I. K. Karpenko-Kary Theatre, Cinema and Television University
- Years active: 1984–present
- Spouse: Natalia Klenina

Stanislav Volodymyrovych Boklan (Ukrainian: Станіслав Володимирович Боклан, born 12 January 1960) is a Ukrainian theater and film actor. Some notable works include The Guide (2013), Battle for Sevastopol (2015), Servant of the People 2 (2016), and the television series Servant of the People (2015–2019).

== Early life ==
Boklan was born on January 12, 1960, in Brusyliv, Zhytomyr Oblast, Soviet Union. Boklan's family resided in Brusyliv until then moving to Kyiv, where he spent the majority of his childhood. After finishing school, Boklan became employed as a meter of electrical parameters in a micromodule at the Kristall plant.

Boklan initially failed the entrance exams when first applying for the Kyiv National I. K. Karpenko-Kary Theatre, Cinema and Television University but was advised to return again next year. In 1984, he graduated from the university.

== Career ==
After graduating, Boklan moved to Mariupol and joined the Donetsk Russian Drama Theater, which he remained part of for 10 years from 1984 to 1994. In the group, he both played a number of roles and wrote several songs for performances. Boklan then joined the Kyiv Academic Young Theatre in 1994. He stayed with the theater group until early 2020, then left the group for unknown reasons.

In 2014, he played Ivan Kocherga, a blind kobzar, in The Guide which was selected, although not nominated, as the Ukrainian entry for the Best Foreign Language Film at the 87th Academy Awards. It did, however, bring Boklan an award for best actor at the Odesa International Film Festival. In 2015, he starred as the Prime Minister of Ukraine Yuriy Ivanovych Chuiko for Kvartal 95 Studio's Servant of the People. He would go on to appear in all 3 seasons as a regular character. Also in 2015, he starred as the father of Major Lyudmila Pavlichenko in Battle of Sevastopol.

== Personal life ==
Stanislav has one younger brother, Mykola Boklan, who is also an actor.

While in the Kyiv Academic Young Theater, Boklan met Natalia Klenina who he later married. Klenina had married and had a son, Kirill Dumsky, before her marriage to Boklan. Dumsky today has 2 children and works as a Dj.

== Filmography ==
=== Television ===
Year	Title	Role	Notes
2002	Gadfly	James Barton	
2015–2019	Servant of the People	Yuriy Ivanovich Chuiko	Main role
2019	Krovnaya mest		
2019	A Mother's Heart		
2019	The Pleasure Principle	Jefremow	
2019	Semya na god	Maryna's father	
2019–2021	Papik	Ded	
2022	Marshall (Polkan)		
2024	December 31st Express	Mykola Ivanovych	

=== Film ===
List of voices in films
Year	Title	Role	Notes
1995	American Blues	Stas Baklan	Minor role
1995	Atentat: Osinnie vbyvstvo u Munkheni	S. Boklan	
1995	Reportazh	Steven Wright	
1995	Stracheni svitanki	Mikhaylo	
2000	The Undefeated	Kozak	
2002	Kukla	August Jardanov	
2005	Zhenskaya intuitsiya 2		
2006	Zvyozdniye kanikuly		
2006	Kaktus i Elena	Drozdov	
2013	The Guide	Ivan Kocherga	Main role
2015	Battle for Sevastopol	Otets Lyudmily	
2016	Servant of the People 2	Yuriy Ivanovich Chuiko	Main role
2019	Peredchuttya	Petro	
2021	Pulse	Coach	
2021	Nerealnyi KOPets	Petro Burundiak	

== State awards ==
- On 18 August 2006, Boklan would earn the Honored Artist of Ukraine award "for significant personal contribution to the socioeconomic and cultural development of the Ukrainian state, significant labor achievements and on the occasion of the 15th anniversary of Ukraine's independence".
- On 22 January 2016, Boklan would earn the People's Artist of Ukraine award "for significant personal contribution to state building, socio-economic, scientific and technical, cultural and educational development of the Ukrainian state, the consolidation of Ukrainian society, [and] many hard years of work".
- Order of Merit III class (September 10, 2021), for a significant personal contribution to the development of cinema, significant creative achievements, high professional skills and on the occasion of the Day of Ukrainian Cinema.
