= Žiežmariai =

- Town
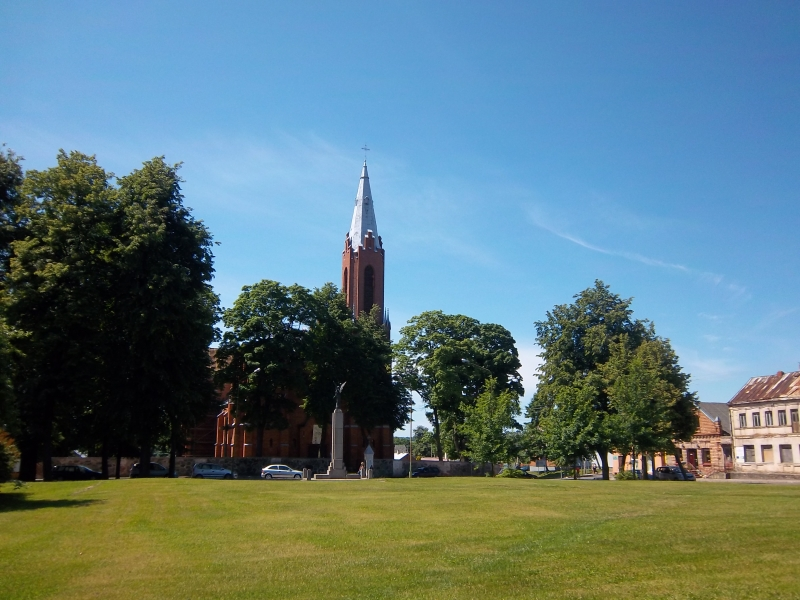

- Flag Coat of arms

- Location of Žiežmariai
- Coordinates: 54°48′0″N 24°27′0″E
- Country: Lithuania
- Ethnographic region: Aukštaitija
- County: Kaunas County
- Municipality: Kaišiadorys district municipality
- Eldership: Žiežmariai eldership
- Capital of: Žiežmariai eldership
- First mentioned: 1348
- Granted city rights: 1501

Population (2021)
  - Total: 3,078
- Time zone: UTC+2 (EET)
  - Summer (DST): UTC+3 (EEST)

Žiežmariai is a town in the Kaišiadorys district municipality, Lithuania. It is located 6 km (3.7 mi) south of Kaišiadorys. The center of Žiežmariai is a state-protected urbanistic monument.

== History ==
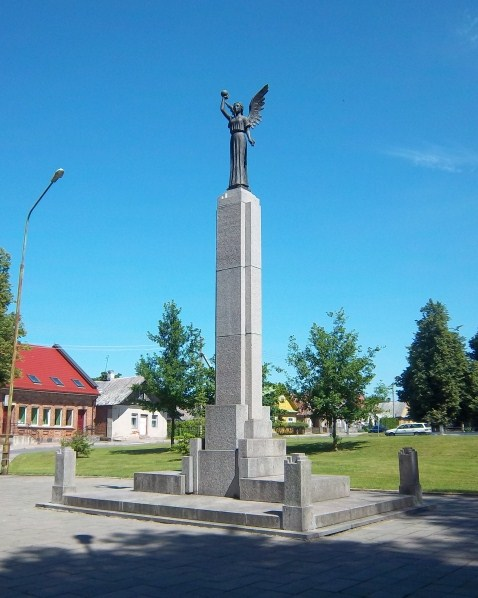
Freedom monument, built in 1932, demolished by Soviet occupants, rebuilt in 1991

Žiežmariai were mentioned for the first time in the 14th century in the Teutonic Die Littauischen Wegeberichte. In 1348 close to Žiežmariai by the river of Strėva, the Battle of Strėva between the Grand Ducal Lithuanian Army led by Algirdas and Kęstutis and the Teutonic Army took place.

Since 15th century Žiežmariai estate is known, in 1487 Žiežmariai town is mentioned. In 1508 or 1509 a Catcholic church was built, and the school was established in 1520. In 1576 and in 1791 Žiežmariai received Magdeburg rights and the coat of arms in 1792. During the 16th century Žiežmariai started to grow intensively due to their proximity to the road Vilnius-Kaunas. In 1580 the town suffered from fire two times. In the 18th century it was devastated by the Swedish army during the Great Northern War, plague epidemic started. In 1812, Žiežmariai was devastated by Napoleon's army during the French invasion of Russia.

In 1777 the parish school was reestablished which taught singing in Latin and Lithuanian.

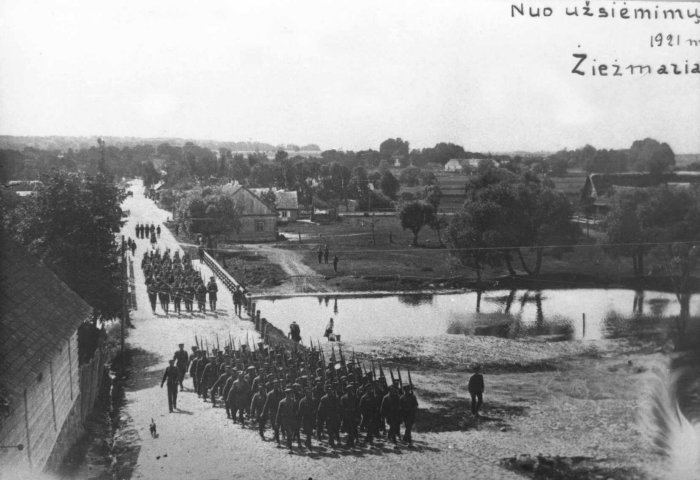
Lithuanian army returning after exercises in Žiežmariai 1921

During the Lithuanian Wars of Independence Lithuanian army stopped the advancing army of bolsheviks at the battle near Žiežmariai.

The Jewish population was important in the town since the 16th century and represented 50% of the total population before World War II. In 1941, hundreds of Jews from the city and from nearby villages of Kaisiadorys and Žasliai were murdered in mass executions perpetrated by an einsatzgruppen of Germans and local collaborators.

In 1941 and in 1948 Soviet occupation deported 20 inhabitants of Žiežmariai. Lithuanian partisans from the Didžioji Kova military district (The Great Fight partisan military district) were active in Žiežmariai district.

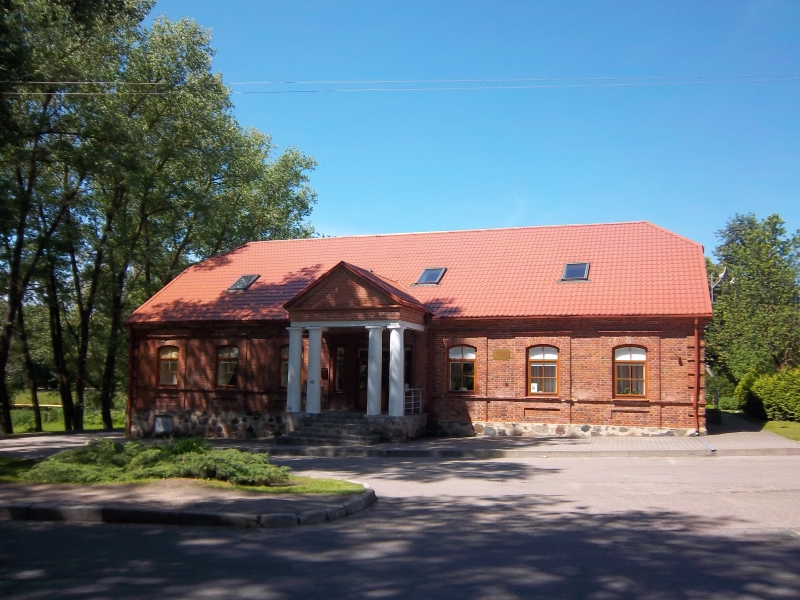
Žiežmariai cultural center

== Notable people ==
- Juozapotas Ignotas Lukaševičius (1789–1850), painter
- Kazys Morkūnas (1924–2014), stained glass artist
- Algimantas Aksomaitis (1936–2012), mathematician
- Vytautas Onaitis (1939–1968), poet
- Danguolė Rasalaitė (1983–2000), victim of human trafficking
