= 8 Best Dates =

2016 film by Maryus Vaysberg

- Theatrical release poster
- Directed by: Maryus Vaysberg
- Written by: Yuri Stukalin; Andrey Yakovlev; Mikhail Savin
- Produced by: Ekaterina Gordetskaya; Andrey Radko
- Starring: Vera Brezhneva; Volodymyr Zelenskyy; Vladimir Epifantsev; Yevhen Koshovyi
- Cinematography: Bruce Allan Green
- Music by: Bryan Carr
- Production company: Central Partnership
- Release date: March 3, 2016 (Russia)
- Running time: 100 minutes
- Countries: Russia; Ukraine
- Language: Russian
- Budget: $1 million
- Box office: $4,085,476

8 Best Dates (Russian: «8 лучших свиданий», romanized: 8 luchshikh svidaniy; Ukrainian: «8 кращих побачень», romanized: 8 krashchykh pobachen) is a 2016 Russian-Ukrainian romantic comedy directed by Maryus Vaysberg. It is a sequel to the 2015 film 8 New Dates. The film stars Vera Brezhneva and Volodymyr Zelenskyy. Initially, the film was planned to be released on December 31, 2015, but the date was later postponed.

== Plot ==
Having learned from the doctors that he has only a few weeks to live, Nikita makes the courageous decision to transfer his family and work to decent hands. An employee of the Ministry of Emergency Situations named Ilya becomes a candidate for a replacement, a decent man all around. Nikita makes every effort to “introduce” Ilya as soon as possible into his life and unexpectedly succeeds in this. Soon, Ilya becomes an excellent father for Nikita's children, an indispensable employee at the clinic and, most importantly, a very appealing man for Masha, Nikita's beautiful wife. However, the real test of this is only beginning, because Nikita soon realizes that the doctors were wrong, and in fact he will not die at all in the near future. Now he has to win back his place in the family and at work, and it turns out to be much more difficult than it seems at first glance.

== Cast ==
- Vera Brezhneva - Maria Igorevna (Masha)
- Volodymyr Zelenskyy - Nikita Andreevich Sokolov
- Vladimir Epifantsev - Ilya
- Yevhen Koshovyi - Senya, driver of the protagonist
- Sergey Kazanin - leader of the music competition
- Nino Kantaria
- Victor Schur
- Maria Gorban - Elena Vasilyevna, Secretary
