= Lilya 4-ever =

2002 Swedish tragedy film by Lukas Moodysson

- Theatrical release poster
- Swedish: Lilja 4-ever
- Directed by: Lukas Moodysson
- Written by: Lukas Moodysson
- Produced by: Lars Jönsson
- Starring: Oksana Akinshina; Artyom Bogucharsky; Elina Benenson; Lyubov Agapova; Liliya Shinkaryova; Pavel Ponomaryov; Tomasz Neuman
- Cinematography: Ulf Brantås
- Edited by: Michal Leszczylowski; Oleg Morgunov; Bernhard Winkler
- Music by: Nathan Larson
- Production companies: Memfis Film; Film i Väst; Sveriges Television; Zentropa Entertainments; Svenska Filminstitutet; Det Danske Filminstitut
- Distributed by: Sonet Film (Sweden); Sandrew Metronome (Denmark)
- Release dates: 23 August 2002 (Sweden); 27 September 2002 (Denmark)
- Running time: 109 minutes
- Countries: Sweden; Denmark
- Languages: Russian; Swedish; English; Polish
- Budget: 30 million SEK (USD$2.7 million)
- Box office: $1 million

Lilya 4-ever (Swedish: Lilja 4-ever) is a 2002 Swedish tragedy film, mostly spoken in Russian, written and directed by Lukas Moodysson which was released in Sweden on 23 August 2002. It depicts the tragic downward spiral of Lilja Michailova, played by Oksana Akinshina, a teenage girl in one of the post-Soviet republics (filmed in Estonia) whose mother abandons her to move to the United States. The story is loosely based on the true case of Danguolė Rasalaitė, and examines the issue of human trafficking and sexual slavery.

The film received positive reviews both in Sweden and abroad. It won five Guldbagge Awards including Best Film and was nominated for Best Film and Best Actress at the European Film Awards.

== Plot ==
The film begins with a girl running towards a motorway bridge. When the girl turns around, the film introduces the audience to Lilya Michailova, an adolescent girl who has recently been badly beaten. The film then reveals her past.

Lilya lives with her mother in a run-down apartment block in an unnamed former republic of the Soviet Union. Lilya's mother tells her they are emigrating to the United States with the mother's new boyfriend, but instead, she abandons Lilya in the care of her aunt while she and the boyfriend move to America. The aunt moves herself into the larger, nicer flat Lilya that her mother had lived in while forcing Lilya to move into a smaller, squalid apartment.

A subsequent succession of humiliations and miseries are heaped upon Lilya. Her best friend Natasha encourages her to join her in prostitution, but Lilya declines. When money is discovered in Natasha's possession, she lies and says the money belongs to Lilya, whose reputation is subsequently ruined in the community and at school. She ultimately has to become a prostitute to support herself.

Meanwhile, Lilya forms another close, protective friendship with a younger boy named Volodya, who is physically abused by his alcoholic single father. She buys Volodya a basketball, but his father punctures it with a pair of scissors. She then meets a young man, Andrei, who becomes her boyfriend and convinces her to move to Sweden, where he says she will have a better life. After arriving in Sweden, she is instead met by a pimp named Witek who takes her to a nearly empty apartment where he imprisons and rapes her. Lilya is then forced to perform sexual acts for a large number of clients.

Despondent over the departure of his only friend, Volodya commits suicide, his soul taking the form of an angel. In his new guise, Volodya comes to Lilya to watch over her and says being in heaven is really good but he wishes he'd stayed alive for longer. On Christmas Day, he transports Lilya to the roof of the apartment building where they lived and, deeply regretting having killed himself, gives her the world as a present, but Lilya rejects the gift because the world is cold and not that good. After an escape attempt, Lilya is violently beaten by her pimp, but she manages her escape when he forgets to lock the door to the apartment he imprisoned her in. Lilya panics when she sees a policewoman pull up outside a gas station (Witek had lied to her that if she tried to escape, the police would deport her back to her country and his partners would find and kill her there) and runs through the streets of Malmö before stopping on a bridge and crying tears of exhaustion and defeat. With the story arriving full circle to the scene at the beginning of the film, Lilya ignores Volodya's angel as he begs her to stop and jumps from the bridge overpass to her death.

The film's conclusion presents two different endings. One version shows Lilya being sent back in time after killing herself to when she made the decision to go to Sweden with Andrei. However, this time she rejects Andrei's offer, and she and Volodya are shown to presumably live happier lives. In the other version, Lilya and Volodya are both angels happily playing basketball on the roof of a tenement building.

== Cast ==
- Oksana Akinshina as Lilya Michailova
- Artyom Bogucharsky as Volodya
- Lyubov Agapova as Lilya's mother
- Liliya Shinkaryova as Anna, Lilya's aunt
- Elina Benenson as Natasha
- Pavel Ponomaryov as Andrei
- Tomasz Neuman as Witek
- Anastasiya Bedredinova as Neighbor
- Tõnu Kark as Sergei
- Nikolai Bentsler as Natasha's boyfriend
- Oleg Rogatchov as Natasha's dad

== Production ==
=== Writing and pre-production ===
The script was loosely based on the life of Danguolė Rasalaitė, a 16-year-old girl from Lithuania whose case had made headlines in Sweden in 2000. A male acquaintance helped Rasalaitė travel to Sweden with the promise of a job in Malmö. When she arrived, a man referred to as "the Russian," who would become her pimp, took her passport and told her she would have to repay him 20,000 SEK (US$2410 in 1999; $4660 today) for travel expenses and she was forced to prostitute herself for the next month. She escaped from the apartment where she was being held in the rough suburb of Arlöv, moved to Malmö and after three months, the day after she had been raped by her boyfriend and two other men, jumped from a bridge on 7 January 2000 and died three days later in hospital. Three letters she was carrying with her unravelled the story. The screenplay was originally supposed to be deeply religious, with Jesus being a prominent character, walking next to Lilja throughout the story. Moodysson wrote the script in Swedish and then had it translated into Russian.

Production was led by Moodysson's usual studio Memfis Film. Co-producers were Film i Väst, Sveriges Television, and Zentropa. Financial support was provided by the Swedish and Danish Film Institutes as well as Nordisk Film- & TV-Fond. The budget was 30 million SEK.

During the casting period, Moodysson and the crew interviewed "something like 1,000" young applicants for the leading roles. The actors had to improvise on a scenario where they had been grounded and were trying to convince their mother to let them go out. While Artyom Bogucharsky had no previous acting experience, Oksana Akinshina had already starred in Sergei Bodrov Jr.'s 2001 crime film Sisters. Moodysson has commented Akinshina as "[not] exactly what I had imagined. She is better than I imagined but different, somehow."

=== Filming and post-production ===
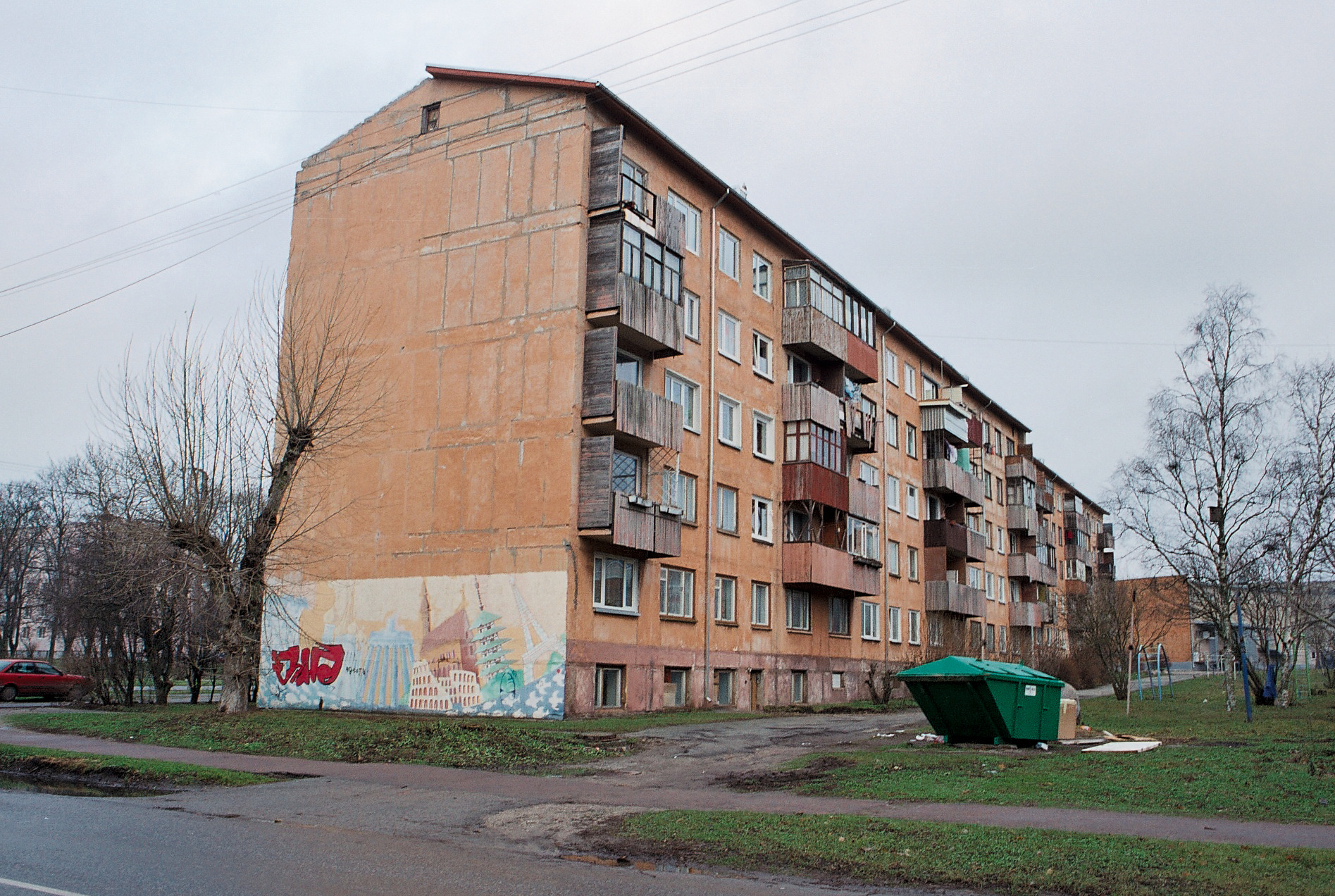
Paldiski in Estonia where the film was largely shot.

As Moodysson recalls, filming took "something like 40 days" to finish in total. Outdoor scenes set in the former Soviet Union were shot in Paldiski, Estonia, a former nuclear submarine training centre for the Soviet Navy. Swedish exteriors were filmed in Malmö and studio scenes in Trollhättan. Interpreters had to be present for the Russian actors to be able to understand Moodysson, who in turn had to direct based on emotional impression from the actors' intonation rather than the words. When the lines didn't sound well he would ask the actors to drop the script and improvise. One of the interpreters was Alexandra Dahlström, the star from Moodysson's debut feature Show Me Love. Dahlström, whose mother is of Russian descent, also served as assistant director, which the producers held as an advantage since she was the same age as the title character.

Director of photography was Ulf Brantås, who started his career as a cinematographer for Roy Andersson and had filmed both of Moodysson's previous feature films. Lilya 4-ever was shot with an Aaton XTR Prod on 16mm film which was later transferred to 35mm. Minimum lighting was used, mainly from practicals and whenever possible only sunlight. Locations were only sparsely rigged by the crew. A custom built rickshaw, made from the wheels of a mountain bike, was used for the long rearward-facing tracking shots. No correction filters were used though the stock was eventually graded in post-production in order to appear slightly warmer.

== Release ==
On 23 August 2002, Sonet Film released Lilja 4-ever in Swedish cinemas. Several festival appearances followed including Venice, Toronto, Vancouver, and London Film Festival. A limited release in the United States begun on 18 April 2003 through Newmarket Films. Metrodome released it on 25 April 2003 in the United Kingdom, where it opened in 13 theatres. The Australian premiere followed on 7 August the same year, distributed by Potential Films.

The film has also been utilised by humanitarian organisations, in information campaigns against human trafficking in various Eastern European countries. In Moldova, the International Organization for Migration received the distribution rights and organised screenings attended by 60,000 people, mostly young females but also members of the government.

== Reception ==
=== Critical response ===
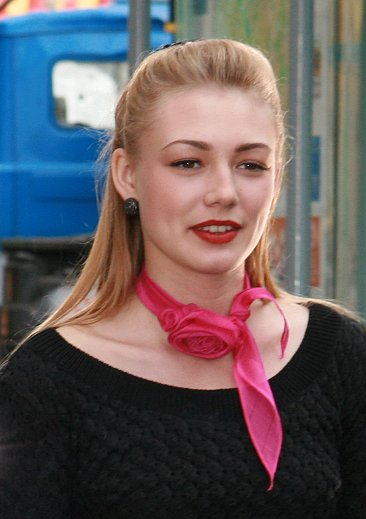
Oksana Akinshina's performance as the title character received universal critical and popular acclaim with reviews praising in particular, her naturalistic, subtle and nuanced approach to such a tragic character which helped the movie and Lilya feel even more realistic and sad without being purely manipulative tear-jerker or award-baiting flashy spectacle. It garnered her multiple European accolades and many consider to be one of the finest breakout performances by an young actress, as well, one of the best female acting of the 21st century.

Swedish critics were very positive to Lilja 4-ever upon its release with unanimous acclaim towards Oksana Akinshina's performance. Malena Janson started her review in Svenska Dagbladet by hailing Moodysson's ability to address different themes and emotional spectra, thereby escaping comparison between his pictures. Janson went on to compare the directing to Lars von Trier's Breaking the Waves and Dancer in the Dark, but found Lilja 4-ever to be superior: "What particularly distinguishes Moodysson's from von Trier's destruction tales and makes it so much more gruesome, are the ties to reality. While we're sitting in the movie theatre and delight and torment ourselves through this masterpiece, happens outside exactly what Lilja encounters perhaps only a few kilometres or miles away from us." The film was fairly successful at the Swedish box office, although significantly less so than Moodysson's previous films. Lilya 4-ever sold 270,000 tickets during the theatrical run, compared to 867,584 for Show Me Love and 882,000 for Together.

The film was embraced by most English-language critics as well. As of December 2023, it holds an 85% approval from 72 reviews listed at Rotten Tomatoes, with an average rating of 7.6/10. The consensus states: "A tragic, hard-hitting story about a teenager trapped in a life of prostitution." Metacritic gives a score of 83 out of 100, based on 26 critics, indicating "universal acclaim".

It was rated with four out of five stars by Michael Hayden in the British film magazine Empire, where he praised the performance by Oksana Akinshina and wrote that the film was "the darkest of fairy tales, complete with wicked aunts and guardian angels" while being "reminiscent of Ken Loach at his most socially aware". Manohla Dargis of the Los Angeles Times noted that the image of the girl lured into prostitution might be a cliché, but held the director's honest intention as an acceptable excuse: "Moodysson wants us to see that there's a real person under the platitudes". She also noted that while the story might be unpleasant to take part of, the discomfort is surpassed by the sheer quality of the film: "This isn't an easy film -- only a memorable one." A negative review came from Sight & Sound's Tony Rayns. Rayns dismissed the film as melodramatic and lacking in substance, while also criticizing the stylistic choice of the dream sequences, as well as the soundtrack's composition: "The most extreme case is [the] use of Rammstein's 'Mein Herz brennt', played at woofer-challenging volume over the opening and closing scenes. ... Even if we take the volume as a metaphor for the girl's wish to block out the world, it's absurd to imagine that Lilja would ever relate to or even listen to a Rammstein track in German. So the wall of sound comes from some 'higher' version of MTV, not from the character or story."

=== Awards and honors ===
Lilya 4-ever won several awards from film festivals around the world including Best Film at Gijón International Film Festival. Akinshina won the awards for Best Actress both in Gijón and at Rouen Nordic Film Festival. Ulf Brantås won the award for Best Cinematography at Zimbabwe International Film Festival and Moodysson for Best Director at Brasília International Film Festival.

The film was the big winner at the 2003 Guldbagge Awards where it received prizes for Best Film, Best Direction, Best Screenplay, Akinshina as Best Actress and Best Cinematography. Bogucharsky was also nominated for Best Actor. It was nominated for Best Film and Best Actress at the European Film Awards. It was Sweden's submission for the Academy Award for Best Foreign Language Film at the 75th Academy Awards, which sparked some controversy when the academy considered to deem it ineligible since the primary language is not Swedish. Eventually it was accepted, but failed to be nominated. In November 2009 the film magazine FLM published a list of the 10 best Swedish films of the decade as voted by 26 of the country's leading critics. Lilya 4-ever appeared as number three on the list, surpassed only by Involuntary and Songs from the Second Floor.

== See also ==
- List of submissions to the 75th Academy Awards for Best Foreign Language Film
- List of Swedish submissions for the Academy Award for Best Foreign Language Film
