= Timur Mindich =

Ukrainian-born entrepreneur (born 1979)

- Тімур Міндіч
- Born: 19 September 1979 (age 46); Dnipropetrovsk, Ukrainian SSR, Soviet Union
- Citizenship: Ukraine; Israel
- Occupations: Entrepreneur; film producer
- Known for: Co-owner of Kvartal 95 Studio
- Spouse: Kateryna Verber
- Children: 3

Timur Mykhailovych Mindich (Ukrainian: Тімур Михайлович Miндіч; born 19 September 1979) is a Ukrainian-Israeli entrepreneur, film producer and the co-owner of Kvartal 95 Studio.

He is also accused of being the "mastermind behind a $100 million embezzlement scheme involving top officials and Ukraine's state nuclear power company."

== Early life ==
Mindich was born on 19 September 1979 in Dnipropetrovsk (now Dnipro), Ukrainian SSR into a family of Jewish entrepreneurs. His father died in Israel in 2006.

== Career ==
Mindich has produced several films, including Shchurolyov (Rat Catcher) and Ukus volchytsi (Bite of the She-Wolf).

He is directly associated with the creative association Kvartal 95 Studio and is also linked to Ukrainian oligarch Ihor Kolomoyskyi, being a co-owner of the television channel Kvartal TV.

According to Kolomoyskyi, Mindich is the former fiancé of his daughter and his "business partner in some minor projects, such as development ones". Mindich is a business partner of Serhiy Shefir (former first assistant to President Volodymyr Zelenskyy) in Kvartal 95 LLC and the Cypriot company Green Family Ltd. Green Family Ltd owns Kvartal 95's film business in Russia.

== Personal life ==
He is married to Kateryna Verber, daughter of Alla Verber (d. 2019), who was the fashion director of Moscow's TsUM department store and vice president of the luxury goods company Mercury. The couple married in 2010 in Jerusalem, Israel. They have three children: daughters Michelle and Elizabeth, and a son, Michael.

== Investigations ==
On 4 June 2025, the High Anti-Corruption Court of Ukraine ordered the detention of Mindich's cousin Leonid, suspected of organizing a scheme to misappropriate ₴12.5 million and attempting to seize an additional ₴120 million from Kharkivoblenergo during the procurement of transformer equipment and measuring devices.

On 10 November 2025, NABU detectives searched the residence of Tymur Mindich.

=== Kinokit ===
According to an investigation by Bihus.Info, a legal advisor to Mindich's company became the owner of Kinokit, which between 2019 and 2025 received over ₴440 million in state contracts.

=== Fire Point ===
Mindich has also been linked to the company Fire Point, which is under NABU investigation over possible overpricing and supply irregularities in drone procurement for the Ministry of Defense.

MP Yaroslav Zheleznyak reported that Mindich had left Ukraine right before the NABU raid on his home on 10 November 2025, and said Mindich would either be in Austria or Israel. According to Times of Israel, Mindich had fled to Israel in 2025. According to Censor.net, Mindich was hiding in Austria as of 11 November 2025.
