= Moscow Zero =

- Movie Poster
- Directed by: María Lidón
- Written by: Adela Ibañez
- Produced by: Dolo Magan
- Starring: Vincent Gallo; Val Kilmer; Oksana Akinshina; Joaquim de Almeida
- Cinematography: Ricardo Aronovich
- Edited by: Elena Ruiz
- Music by: Javier Navarrete
- Production company: Valentia Pictures
- Distributed by: Sony Pictures
- Release date: May 20, 2006 (Cannes Film Festival)
- Running time: 82 minutes
- Countries: United States; United Kingdom; Spain; Russia
- Languages: English; Russian
- Box office: $85,455

Moscow Zero is a 2006 American horror film directed by María Lidón.

== Plot ==
An anthropologist called Sergei goes missing after researching a legend about the existence of demons and an entrance to Hell beneath Moscow. A rescue team led by his friend Owen, an American priest, searches for Sergei in the caves and catacombs beneath the city of Moscow which are inhabited by demons.

== Cast ==
Actor	Role
Vincent Gallo	Owen
Oksana Akinshina	Lyuba
Val Kilmer	Andrey
Sage Stallone	Vassily
Joaquim de Almeida	Yuri
Rade Šerbedžija	Sergei
Joss Ackland	Tolstoy
Julio Perillán	Alec Miller
