= RAZ 3 =

Ukrainian television channel

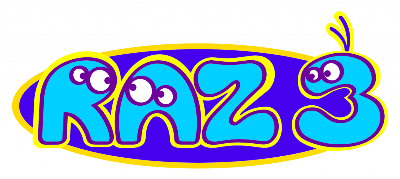
- Country: United States
- Broadcast area: Ukraine
- Headquarters: Wyoming

Programming
- Languages: Ukrainian; Russian
- Picture format: 16:9 (576i, SDTV)

Ownership
- Owner: Poverkhnost

History
- Launched: 8 August 2016
- Former names: Kvartal TV (2016—2026)

RAZ 3 is a Ukrainian entertainment television channel owned by Poverkhnost. Its licensee, Mriya Media Holdings, is registered in Sheridan, Wyoming.

Originally, it was known as Kvartal TV and was owned by Kvartal 95 Studio in association with 1+1 Media, who was responsible for its playout. On 1 September 2026, Poverkhnost took over and changed the identity.

== History and profile ==
In December 2015, it was announced that Film.ua Group and Kvartal 95 announced the joint creation of a television channel (Kvartal TV).

Broadcasts began on 8 August 2016 on subscription television operators. The channel was owned in an equal 50/50 split between Kvartal 95 and 1+1. Distribution and marketing of the channel are handled by 1+1 Media, while its management was shared between its two partners. It targets an audience within the 18-54 demographic, in cities with a population higher than 50,000 inhabitants, and launch programming drew upon repeats of Kvartal 95's productions. Plans for original content were already outlined, by investing all of the rent in the creation of such programs. Plans to buy third-party comedy series were also on the pipeline. At launch, it was made available on Viasat Ukraine (of which 1+1 Media is its owner), while negotiations with other providers began. If Kvartal TV was seen as a success, 1+1 Media would eventually start new pay-TV projects.

On 20 January 2017, the channel moved entirely to encrypted distribution, using the Verimatrix system. The decision made Kvartal TV more attractive to interested subscription television providers.

In the context of the Russian invasion of Ukraine, from 24 February 2022, all regular programs stopped, being replaced by the United News marathon. Regular broadcasts resumed on 5 June 2022, with all Russian-language content being dubbed in Ukrainian.

On 31 October 2023, 1+1 Media's Vision 2 (Віжн 2) license won the right to operate on the Ukrainian DVB-T2 network on the MX-7 multiplex. Subsequently on 23 September 2024, the license name — Vision 2+2 LLC (ТОВ «Віжн 2+2») — changed its name to Vision Kvartal TV (Віжн Квартал ТВ).

On 7 November 2024, the National Radio and Television Council reissued Vision Kvartal TV's license to operate on digital terrestrial television from Vision 2 (Віжн 2) to Kvartal TV. At the same time, the regulator canceled Kvartal TV LLC's satellite license, registering it again under the one used by Vision Kvartal TV LLC.

On September 1, 2026, Kvartal TV was taken over by Viktor Samoilenko's company "Poverkhnost+", renamed it to "RAZ 3" and ceased satellite broadcasting.
