= Yevhen Koshovyi =

Ukrainian actor (born 1983)

- Євген Кошовий
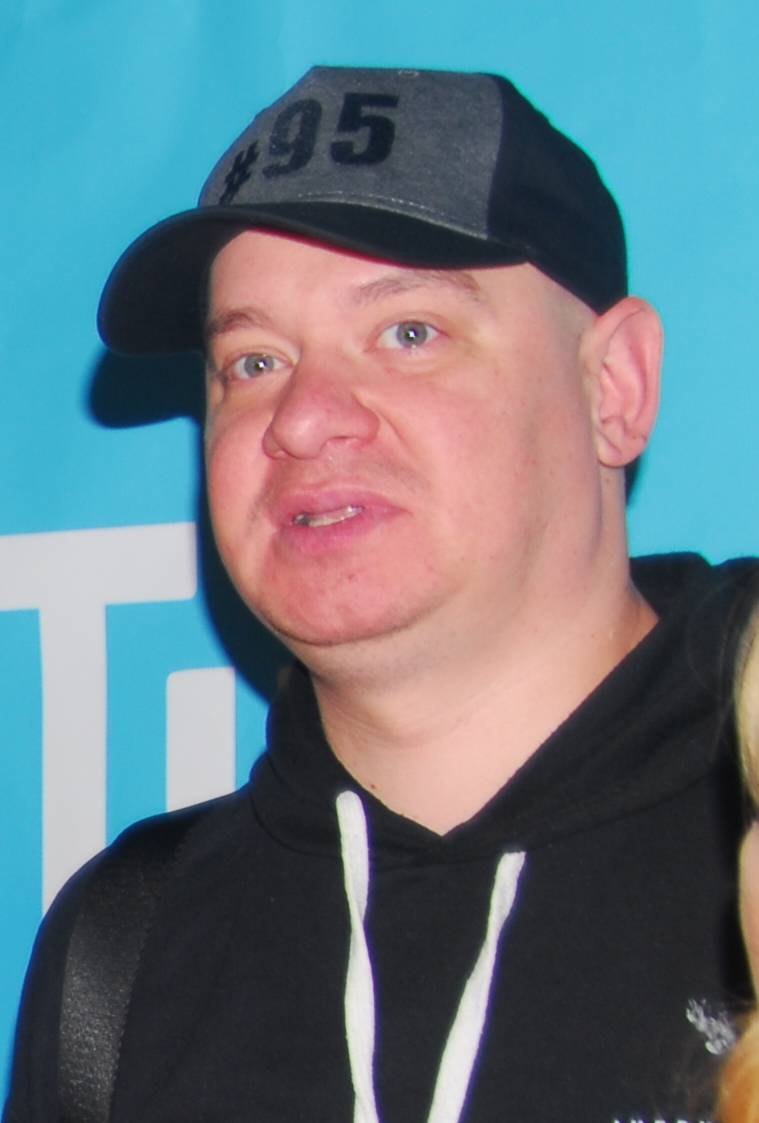
- Koshovyi at the premiere of the film Me. You. He. She (2018)
- Born: April 7, 1983 (age 43); Kivsharivka, Kharkiv Oblast, Ukrainian SSR, Soviet Union (now Ukraine)
- Citizenship: Ukraine
- Education: Luhansk Institute of Culture and Arts
- Children: 2
- Awards: Order of Merit

Yevhen Viktorovych Koshovyi (Ukrainian: Євген Вікторович Кошовий; born April 7, 1983) is a Ukrainian showman, TV presenter, and comic actor. In the past, he was a member of the KVN team "VaBank" from Luhansk (2000–2005). Since 2005, he has been a host of the show "Evening Kvartal". Since 2019, he has hosted the TV program "League of Laughter". Koshovyi is also known for being one of the closest friends of President Volodymyr Zelenskyy.

== Early life ==
Yevhen Koshovyi was born into the family of a factory worker and a kindergarten teacher in Kivsharivka, Kharkiv Oblast, Soviet Union (now Ukraine). In 1989, the family moved to Alchevsk in Luhansk Oblast. Koshovyi graduated from the Acting Faculty of Luhansk College of Culture. He graduated in absentia from the Director's Faculty of the Luhansk Institute of Culture and Arts. In addition, he studied at a music school to play the saxophone.

== Career ==
Koshovyi is the only member of Kvartal 95 Studio who is a professionally trained actor. He joined the KVN team "Who to Call" in his first year in university, and later also joined the Luhansk KVN team "VaBank". In 2004, Zelenskyy invited Koshovyi to join Kvartal 95 after VaBank took part in a Kvartal 95 project in Crimea.

He is the co-host of the morning Sunday entertainment program "Ukraine, get up!" on the TV channel "Inter". Since 2013, he has been the judge of the program "Make the Comedian Laugh". Since 2017, he has been a member of the jury of the "League of Laughter". In 2019, he became the host of the "League of Laughter", replacing Volodymyr Zelenskyy, who resigned after being elected president of Ukraine.

Koshovyi's nickname is "Lysyy" ("the bald one"), due to his bald head. However, he is not naturally bald, but has shaved his head since a KVN sketch in 2002 when his bald head became his trademark.

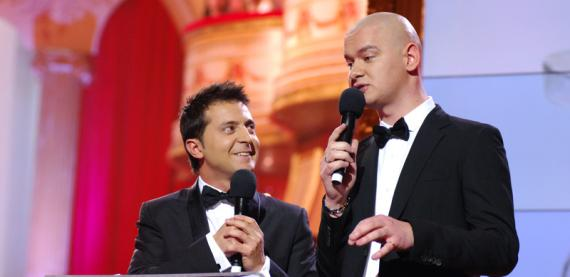
Volodymyr Zelenskyy (left) and Koshovyi (right) cohosting and opening Teletriumph 2011, the national television awards of Ukraine.

== Personal life ==
Koshovyi has been married since 2007 to his wife Kseniya, who is a dancer in Olena Kolyadenko's ballet "Freedom". They have two daughters, Varvara and Serafima.

President Volodymyr Zelenskyy mentioned Koshovyi in his 24 February 2022 speech to the Russian people just before the full-scale Russian invasion of Ukraine; rejecting claims that Ukraine would attack the Donbas, Zelenskyy asked "To shoot who? To bomb what? … Luhansk? The home of my best friend’s mother? The place where his father is buried?" This "best friend" was Koshovyi.

== Awards ==
In August 2022, Koshovyi received the Order of Merit (3rd class), together with fellow Kvartal 95 member Oleksandr Pikalov and others.

== Filmography ==
- 2006 – «Police Academy»
- 2007 – «A Very New Year Film/Night in the Museum» – Nostradamus
- 2008 – «Shoot, Immediately!» – administrator of the hotel
- 2009 – «Like Cossacks…» (musical, Yevhen)
- 2010 – «Love in the Big City 2» (gastarbeiter)
- 2011 – «Bayky Mytyaya» – Yevheniy, student
- 2011 – «Heavenly Families» – the dry one, zek
- 2011 – «Office Romance. Our Time» (Stepan, system administrator)
- 2012 – «Rzhevsky vs. Napoleon» (Levsha)
- 2012 – «That Same Carlson!» (teacher)
- 2012 – «8 First Dates» (taxi driver)
- 2014 – «Love in the Big City 3» – Nikolaichuk, private detective (works for detective agency "Shield and Sword")
- 2015 – «8 New Dates» – guest at the wedding
- 2015 – «Servant of the People» – Serhii Viktorovich Mukhin, minister of international affairs
- 2016 – «8 Best Dates» – «driver of the main hero»
- 2017 – «Servant of the People 2» – Serhii Viktorovich Mukhin, minister of international affairs
- 2018 – «Me. You. He. She» – Boris
