= December 31st Express =

2024 Ukrainian comedy film

- Потяг у 31 грудня
- Directed by: Oleg Borshchevskyi
- Produced by: Zoia Sochenko; Yurіy Horbunov
- Starring: Stanislav Boklan; Kateryna Kuznetsova; Artemii Yehorov
- Edited by: Volodimir Zapryahalov
- Production company: Prototip prodakshn
- Distributed by: Green Light Films; FILM.UA Distribution
- Release date: 1 January 2025
- Running time: 90 mins
- Country: Ukraine
- Language: Ukrainian
- Box office: ₴52,009,488

December 31st Express is a 2024 Ukrainian comedy film directed by Oleg Borshchevsky. It was written by Mykola Kutsyk, Yaroslav Sten, Bohdan Gatsylyak, and Kyrylo Tymchenko. According to the plot, a train ride on New Year's Eve unites the main characters of the comedy film. The film was produced distributed by the film company Film.UA.

== Plot ==
On New Year’s Eve, Mykola Ivanovych, a train conductor started his last journey before retirement from Kyiv to Lviv. But, his shift becomes chaotic when a group of eccentric passengers boards the train. As the train travels through the night, a lot of misunderstandings and arguments take place. Among the passengers are unusual people like a runaway bride, angry accountant and other unique personalities, each bringing their own problems and secrets, which upsets Ivanovych.

As the journey continues, delays and unexpected stops make matters worse, which increases the tension among the passengers. However, over time, they begin to interact with each other and shares their struggles and connects with each other.

By the end of the trip, the passengers come together and help each other to solve their problems.

== Cast ==
- Stanislav Boklan as Mykola Ivanovych
- Kateryna Kuznetsova as Tamara Petrynenko
- Artemii Yehorov as Oleksii Petrynenko
- Anastasia Ivaniuk as Solomiia
- Dmytro Pavko as Oleh
- Volodymyr Nikolaienko as Ihor
- Liliia Tsvelikova as Iryna
- Yurii Horbunov as Petrovych
- Valerii Shvets as Iryna's father
- Nataliia Koretska as Iryna's mother
- Mykhailo Khoma as Mykhailovych
- Lesia Nikitiuk as Yana
- Boris Johnson as himself

== Music ==
The film's music and original themes were composed by Klavdia Petrivna and Yaktak.

No.	Title	Lyrics	Length
1.	"Winter"	Klavdia Petrivna
2.	"Waiting at Home"	Yaktak

== Reception ==
=== Critical reception ===
Mykola Pidvezianyi, editor-in-chief of Glavkom described the movie as a good New Year's comedy for a mass audience.

According to film crtic Kyrylo Pyshchykov, the movie can described with the word "excessiveness". According to him, the movie shows a lot of advertising. He also said that there was no central idea to unify all the chaos. As a result, the only factor that unified all the chaos in this film was the train.

=== Box office ===
December 31st Express collected ₴52,009,488, with overall ticket sales of about 300,000. During its opening weekend, which began on 1 January 2025, December 31st Express grossed ₴17,029,114, with 100,924 tickets sold.
