= 95th Kvartal, Kryvyi Rih =

Neighbourhood in Kryvyi Rih, Ukraine

95th Quarter
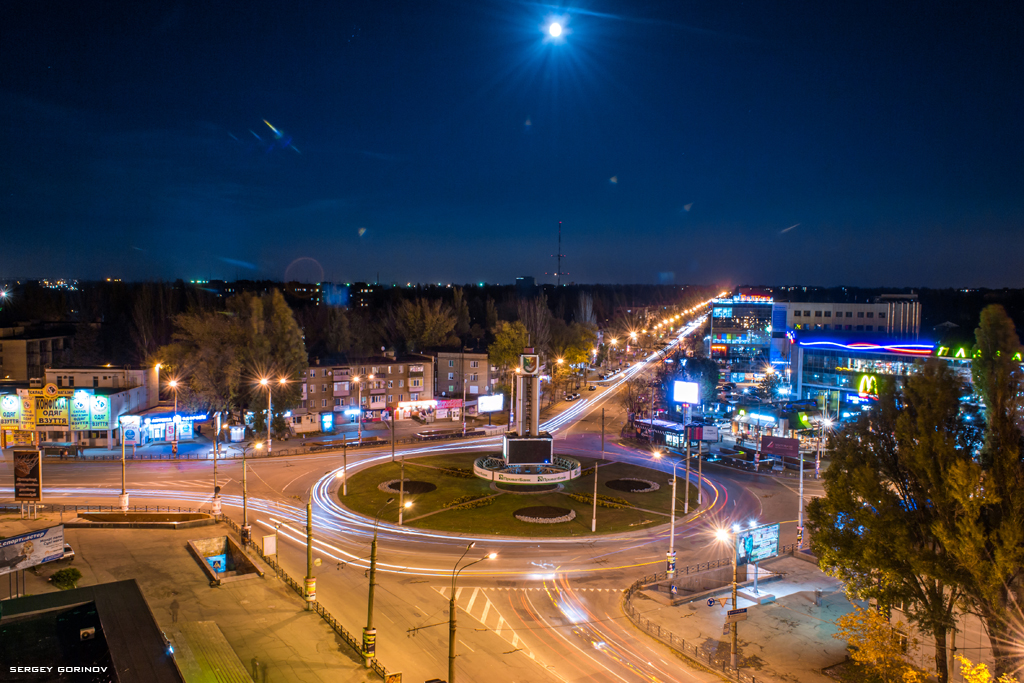
- Evening view of the 95th Quarter Square
- Interactive map of 95th Quarter
- Former name: Gorky square
- Area: Saksahansky District, Metallurgical District
- Location: Kryvyi Rih, Ukraine
- Nearest metro station: City Council; 1М 2М 3М 4М; Mudryona; 1М 2М 3М 4М
- Coordinates: 47°54′37″N 33°23′30″E

95th Quarter or 95th Kvartal (Ukrainian: 95 квартал) is a public square and also a residential neighborhood in downtown Kryvyi Rih, Ukraine. Its name literally means "quarter", in the way the city was divided during the post-war (World War II) Soviet period.

Nowadays, the neighborhood became famous in connection with the 6th president of Ukraine Volodymyr Zelenskyy — and his stage production Kvartal 95 Studio, which was named after it due to its proximity to all project participants (although the number "95" also had symbolic significance). With Zelenskyy becoming President of Ukraine and gaining increasing international fame, the name "95th Quarter" spread beyond Ukraine.

== Gallery ==
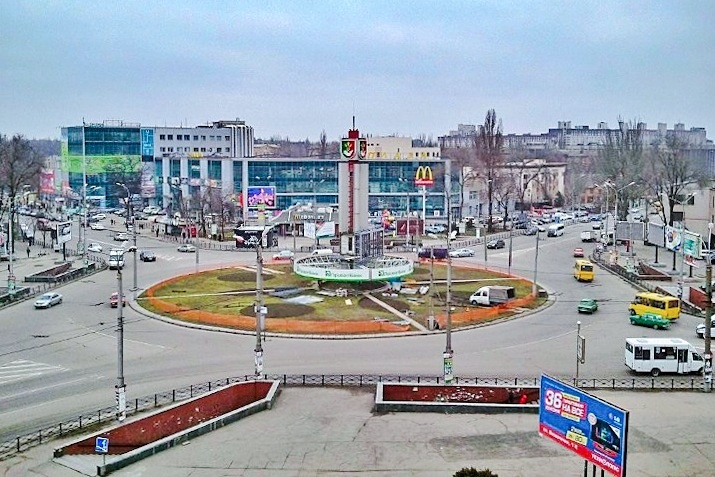
95th Quarter Square

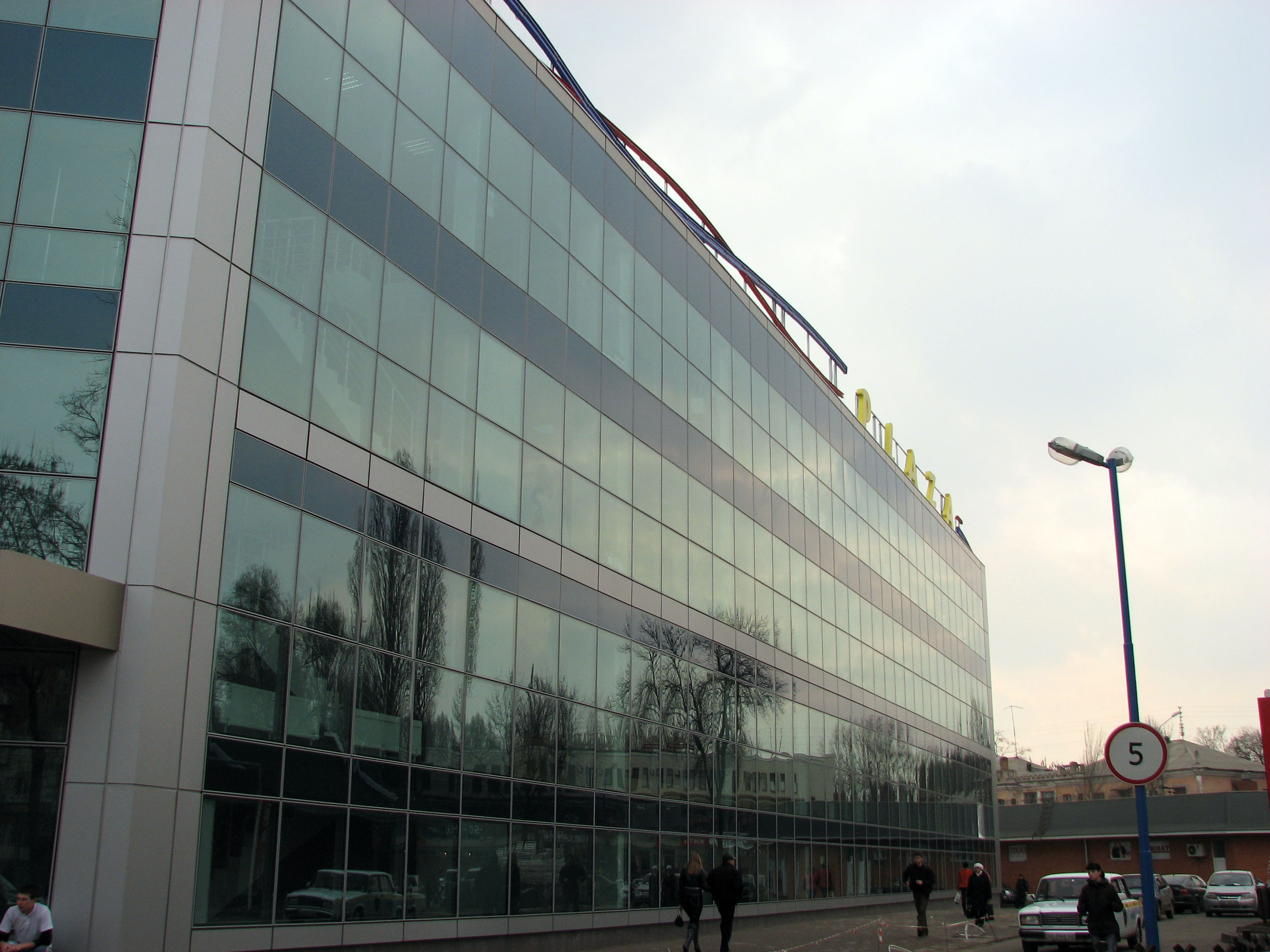
"Plaza" shopping mall

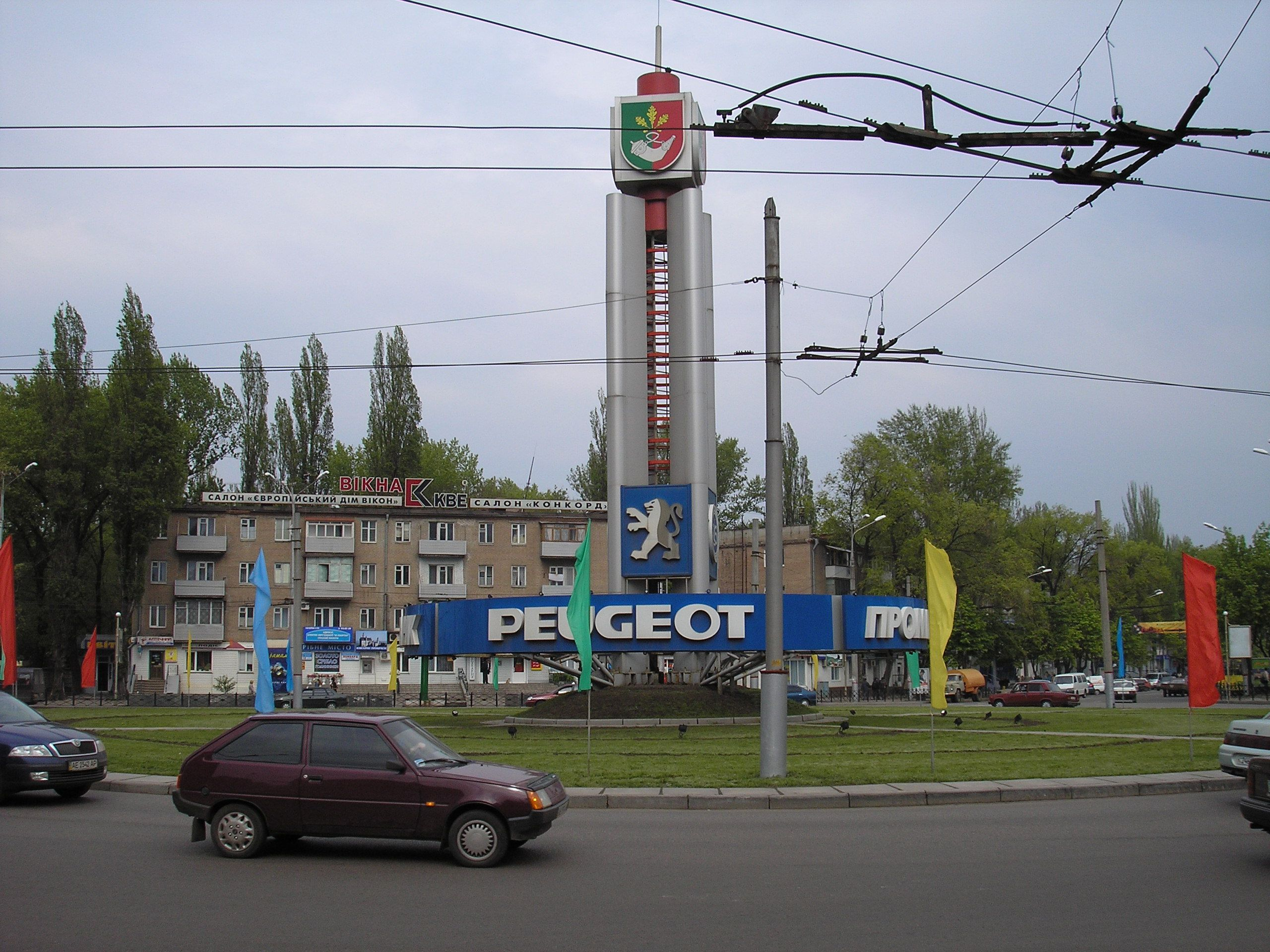
The 95th Quarter Square roundabout

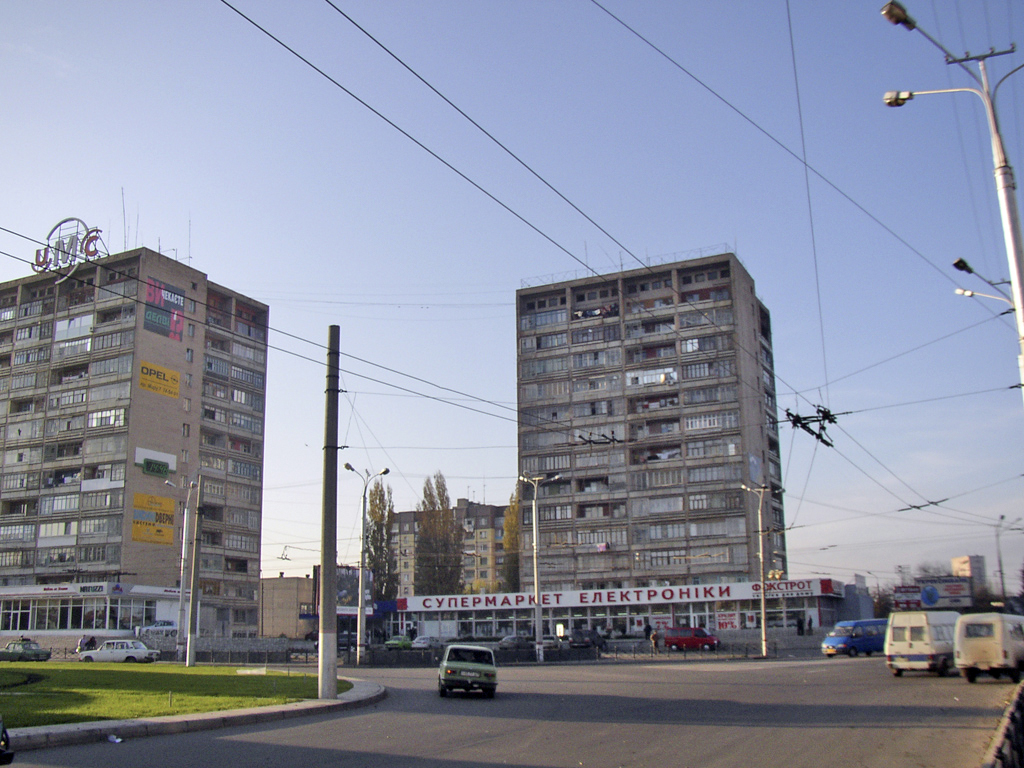
Soviet era residential buildings
(aka The Doctors' houses)
