= Oksana Akinshina =

Russian actress (born 1987)

- Оксана Акиньшина
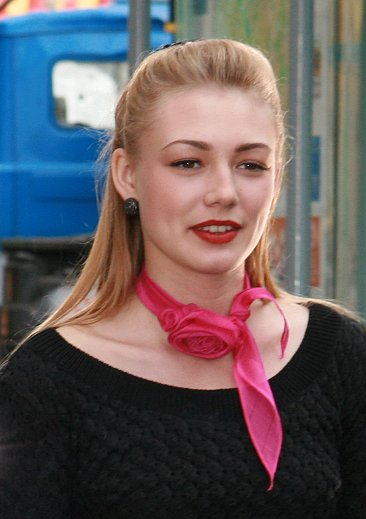
- Akinshina in 2007
- Born: Oksana Sergeevna Akinshina; 19 April 1987 (age 39); Leningrad, Russian SFSR, Soviet Union
- Occupation: Actress
- Years active: 2000–present
- Spouses: Dmitry Litvinov (m. 2007; div. 2010) Archil Gelovani (m. 2012; div. 2018) Danila Kozlovsky (m. 2026)
- Children: 4

Oksana Sergeevna Akinshina (Russian: Оксана Сергеевна Акиньшина; born 19 April 1987) is a Russian actress. She is known for her roles in the films Sisters (2001), Lilya 4-ever (2002), The Bourne Supremacy (2004), Hipsters (2008) and Sputnik (2020).

== Early life ==
Akinshina was born on 19 April 1987 in Saint-Petersburg, Russia. (Previously known in the USSR, Leningrad.) Her father is a car mechanic, and her mother is an accountant. She has a younger sister. At the time she landed the role in Lilya 4-ever (2002), Akinshina only spoke Russian and communicated with director Lukas Moodysson with the help of Alexandra Dahlström as her interpreter.

== Career ==
Starting acting at age 12, Akinshina was discovered by Sergei Bodrov Jr. and made her screen debut in the Russian crime film Sisters (2001), Bodrov's directorial debut.

Her second film, Lilya 4-Ever (2002), earned her a 2002 European Film Award nomination for Best Actress. She lost, however, to the eight actresses of the film 8 Women (2002). For her role in Lilya 4-Ever, she also received the award for Best Actress in Leading Role from the Guldbagge Awards.

Since then, Akinshina has acted in the films Het Zuiden—directed by Martin Koolhoven—and The Bourne Supremacy (2004)—directed by Paul Greengrass. In 2010, she starred in the television series Interns (TV series).

== Personal life ==
From 2007 to 2010, Akinshina was married to businessman Dmitry Litvinov, with whom she has a son (born 2009). In 2012, Akinshina married film producer Archil Gelovani, with whom she has two children, a son and a daughter. The couple separated in 2018. Danila Kozlovsky married Oksana, and they had a son in May 2026.

== Filmography ==
=== Film ===
Year	Title	Role	Notes
2001	Sisters	Svetlana "Sveta" Malakov	
2002	Lilya 4-ever	Lilya Michailova	
2002	In Motion	Ania	
2003	The Moth Games	Zoyka	
2003	Het zuiden	Zoya	
2004	The Bourne Supremacy	Irena Neski	
2006	Moscow Zero	Lyuba	
2006	Moscow Mission	Anna	
2007	Wolfhound	Knesinka Elen	
2008	Stilyagi	Polsza	
2008	Birds of Paradise	Katenyka	
2008	Number One Enemy	Katya	
2009	I Am	Nina	
2011	Vysotsky. Thank You For Being Alive	Tatiana Ivleva	
2012	8 First Dates	Vera Kazantseva	
2012	Wristcutters	Marina	
2012	Nowhere to hurry	Female Motorcyclist	
2015	8 New Dates	Vera Kazantseva	
2015	SOS, Ded Moroz, or all come true!	Olga	
2016	SuperBobrovy	Sveta Bobrova	
2016	Versus	Vera	
2016	Children's World		
2016	8 Best Dates	Vera Kazantseva	
2019	Quiet Comes the Dawn	Maria Konnova	
2020	Sputnik	Tatyana Yuryevna Klimova	
2020	Chernobyl: Abyss	Olga Savostina	

=== Television ===
Year	Title	Role	Notes
2003	Kamenskaya III: The Illusion of a Sin	Ira Terekhina	
2004	Women in the Game without Rules	Alka	
2005	Female Novel	Ksenia	
2006	Captain's Children	Polina Grinyova	
2010	Interns (TV series)	Darya	
2010	Blizzard	Varya	
2015	Loop Nesterov	Olga, Korolev's daughter	
2016	To each his own	Oksana	
2021–2023	Container	Sasha	
2022	The Telki	Lena	
2025	Konstantinopol	Ekaterina Dikova	

== Awards and nominations ==
Year	Award	Category	Nominated work	Result
2002	Bratislava International Film Festival Awards	Best Actress	Sisters	Won
2003	European Film Awards	Best Actress	Lilya 4-ever	Nominated
2003	Gijón International Film Festival Awards	Best Actress	Lilya 4-ever	Won
2003	Guldbagge Awards	Best Actress	Lilya 4-ever	Won
2003	Rouen Nordic Film Festival Awards	Best Actress	Lilya 4-ever	Won
2003	Stockholm Film Festival Awards	Best Actress	Lilya 4-ever	Won
2012	Nika Award	Best Actress	Vysotsky. Thank You For Being Alive	Nominated
