= Halyna Bezruk =

Ukrainian actress and singer (born 1988)

- Галина Безрук
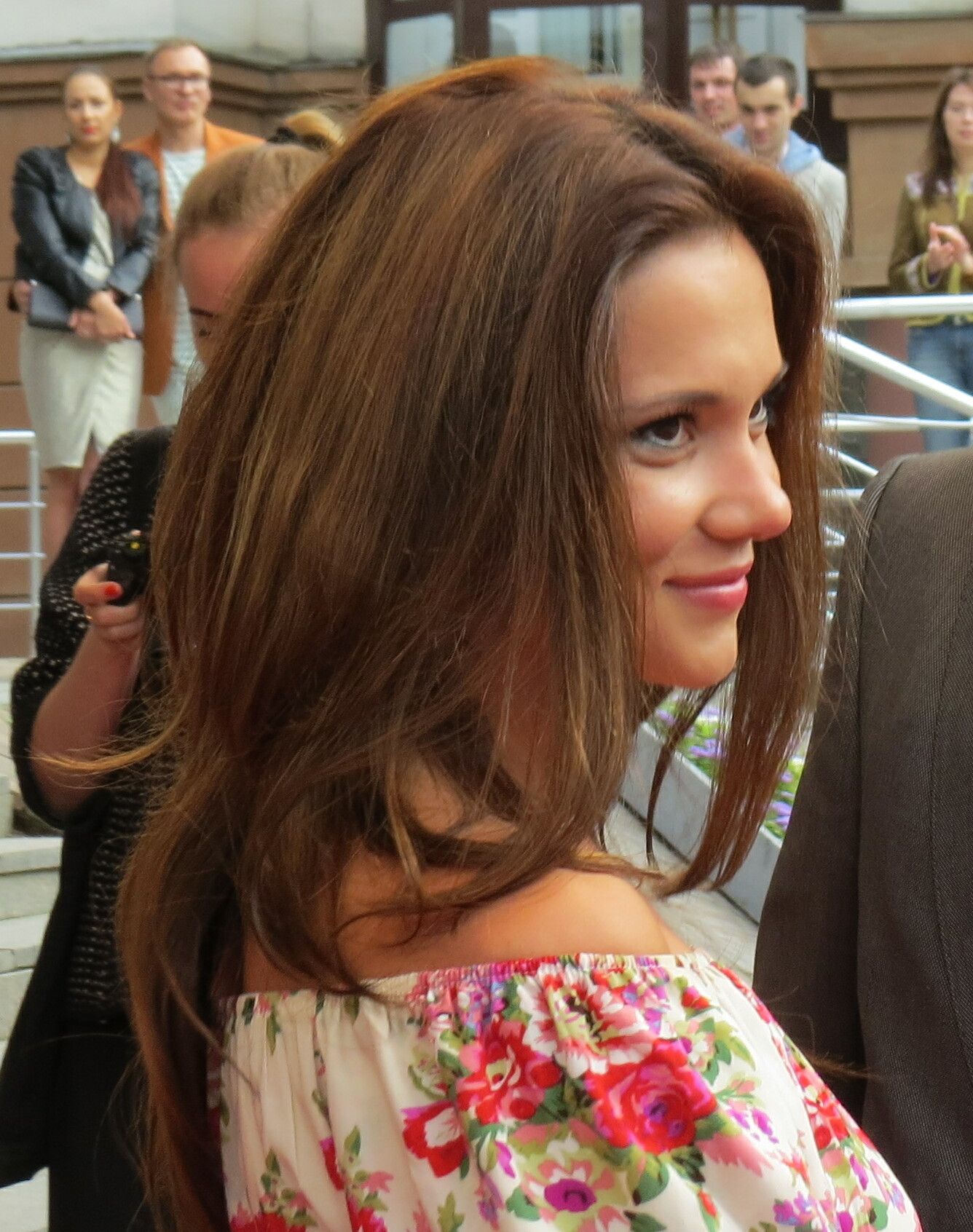
- Bezruk at Voices International Festival 2015 in Vologda.
- Born: Halyna Anatolyivna Bezruk; 1 March 1988 (age 38); Kramatorsk, Ukrainian SSR, Soviet Union
- Citizenship: Ukraine
- Occupations: Actress; singer
- Spouse: Artyom Alekseev

Halyna Anatolyivna Bezruk (Note: Ukrainian: Галина Анатоліївна Безрук, Russian: Галина Анатольевна Безрук (Galina Anatolyevna Bezruk)) (born 1 March 1988) is a Ukrainian actress and singer. In 2012, she became a finalist in the second season of the reality talent show Holos Krainy. Bezruk's mostly notable roles include the TV series Servant of the People, "The Last Muscovite" and "House of Happiness".

== Biography ==
Bezruk was born on 1 March 1988 in Kramatorsk.

At the age of 5, she started learning to play the violin at a music school, later became a member of a children's choir. At the age of 5, Bezruk danced in the "Zernyatka" collective under the direction of Olga Bibikova and in the "Bam-Buk" folk theater under the direction of Mykola Mitla. At the age of 17, she entered the acting department of the Kyiv National I. K. Karpenko-Kary Theatre, Cinema and Television University, which she successfully graduated in 2010 with the specialty "Announcer, TV presenter, film actor". During her student years, she made her debut on the theater stage at the Les Kurbas State Theater Arts Center.

Since 2015, Bezruk lives in Russia and is an actress of The Musical Theatre in Moscow.

== Personal life ==
On 11 August 2016, Bezruk married actor Artyom Alekseev, whom she met on the set of the TV series "While the Village Sleeps" in 2014. On 13 December, she gave birth to a daughter, Vasilisa.

Bezruk has refused to comment on the Russo-Ukrainian War due to fears she could face criminal prosecution by Russian authorities.
