= Oleksandr Pikalov =

Ukrainian actor

- Олександр Пікалов
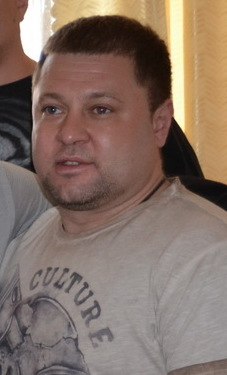
- Pikalov in 2016
- Born: January 30, 1976 (age 50); Kryvyi Rih, Ukrainian SSR, Soviet Union
- Education: Kryvyi Rih National University
- Children: 1
- Awards: Order of Merit

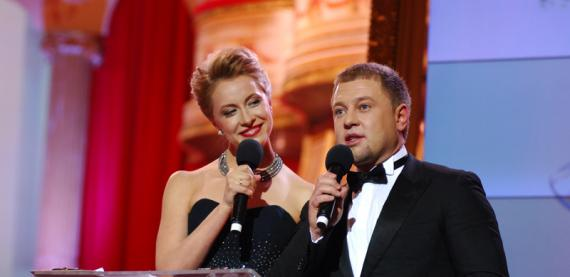
Olena Kravets (left) and Pikalov (right), Co-Presenters of Teletriumph 2011. The Teletriumph Awards are the national television awards of Ukraine.

Oleksandr Viktorovych Pikalov (Ukrainian: Олександр Вікторович Пікалов; born 30 January 1976) is a Ukrainian actor, comedian, and member of Kvartal 95 Studio.

== Biography ==
Pikalov was born in Kryvyi Rih, Ukraine on 30 January 1976, and studied engineering at Kryvyi Rih National University, but did not work as an engineer.

Pikalov is one of the founding members of Kvartal 95. He has participated in most Kvartal 95 projects, such as Servant of the People, Evening Kyiv, Evening Kvartal and others. He is also the art director of Women's Kvartal, a women's comedy show launched in 2018.

After the full-scale Russian invasion of Ukraine in 2022, Pikalov joined the National Guard of Ukraine. He also founded the "Charitable Fund of Oleksandr Pikalov" in August 2022 to assist children forced to evacuate from Mariupol due to the Russian invasion, and to provide social and educational support for other children in Ukraine. Together with the rest of Kvartal 95, he has continued to perform for soldiers during the full-scale invasion; the group has performed hundreds of times for the military.

== Personal life ==
Pikalov is divorced and has a son.

== Awards ==
In August 2022, Pikalov received the Order of Merit (3rd class), together with fellow Kvartal 95 member Yevhen Koshovyi and others.

== See also ==
- Volodymyr Zelenskyy
