= 8 New Dates =

2015 film by Maryus Vaysberg

- Theatrical release poster
- Directed by: Maryus Vaysberg
- Written by: Sergey Shefir, Boris Shefir, Andrey Yakovlev, Mikhail Savin, Dmitry Kozlov, Alexander Bragin, Yuri Kostyuk, Yuri Mikulenko, Dmitry Grigorenko
- Produced by: Ekaterina Gordetskaya; Andrey Radko; Mikhail Galustyan; Boris Shefir
- Starring: Oksana Akinshina; Volodymyr Zelenskyy; Polina Maksimova; Mikhail Galustyan
- Cinematography: Bruce Allan Green
- Music by: Bryan Carr
- Production company: Central Partnership
- Release date: January 1, 2015 (2015)
- Running time: 86 minutes
- Countries: Russia; Ukraine
- Language: Russian
- Budget: $2.3 million
- Box office: $7 456 577

8 New Dates (Russian: «8 новых свиданий», romanized: 8 novykh svidaniy; Ukrainian: «8 нових побачень», romanized: 8 novykh pobachen') is a 2015 Russian-Ukrainian romantic comedy directed by Maryus Vaysberg. It is a sequel to the 2012 film 8 First Dates. The film stars Oksana Akinshina and Volodymyr Zelenskyy.

== Plot ==
Vera and Nikita have been married for three years. In the midst of a quarrel, they exchange categorical opinions with each other about what constitutes as a "normal husband" and "good wife."

The next day they wake up each with their ideal partner in the same bed. Now each of them has their own better half: Nikita has a busty blonde (Polina Maksimova) who cooks well, and Vera has a caring husband-businessman (Mikhail Galustyan) who buys her favorite croissants for breakfast in the morning. Vera and Nikita end up having to choose whether to live with their new families, or to get back together again. As a result, the spouses understand that, despite the quarrels, their feelings for each other are strong, and they reconcile.

== Cast ==
- Oksana Akinshina – Vera Kazantseva
- Volodymyr Zelenskyy – Nikita Andreevich Sokolov
- Polina Maksimova – Kristina
- Mikhail Galustyan – Timur
- Victor Vasilyev – Lyosha
- Sabina Akhmedova – Karina
- Yevhen Koshovyi – wedding guest
- Natalia Iokhvidova – Nikita's secretary
- Natalia Ungard – mother-in-law
- Sergey Belyaev – father-in-law
