= Olena Kravets =

Ukrainian actor and comedian

- Олена Кравець
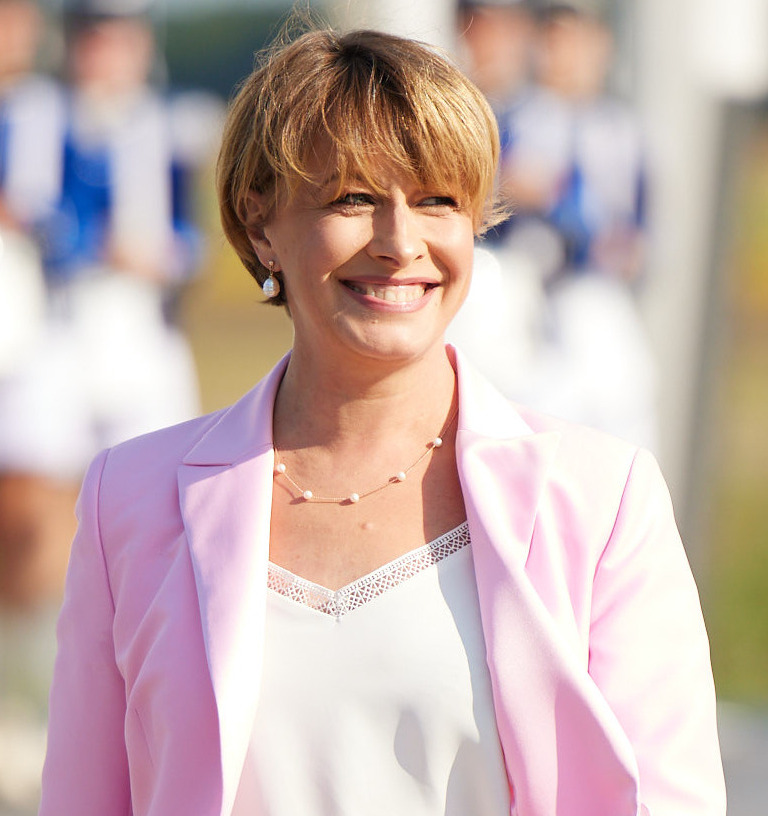
- Kravets in 2021
- Born: 1 January 1977 (age 49); Kryvyi Rih, Ukrainian SSR, Soviet Union
- Education: Kryvyi Rih Institute of Economics
- Years active: 1998–present
- Children: 3

Olena Yuriivna Kravets (Ukrainian: Олена Юріївна Кравець; born 1 January 1977) is a Ukrainian actress, producer and television host.

== Early life and career ==
Olena Maliashenko was born in Kryvyi Rih in Dnipropetrovsk Oblast. She is the only daughter of Yurii Viktorovych Maliashenko and Nadiia Fedorivna Maliashenko (a metallurgist and economist, respectively). She is best known internationally as the executive director of the Kvartal 95 Studio since 2000.

In late 2022, Kravets left Kvartal 95 after 25 years with the studio, for health reasons and to focus on other projects.

== Personal life ==
On 21 September 2002, she married the producer Serhii Kravets and adopted the surname of her husband. From this marriage, they have three children: Mariia, born on 24 February 2003, and twins Ivan and Kateryna, born on 15 August 2016.

On the occasion of her second pregnancy, Kravets launched her own line of specialized clothing for pregnant women under the name "OneSize by Lena Kravets".
