= Kvartal 95 Studio =

Ukrainian production company

Studio Kvartal 95
- Company type: Public
- Industry: Film; television
- Founded: 2003; 23 years ago
- Founders: Volodymyr Zelenskyy; Serhiy Shefir; Boris Shefir
- Headquarters: Kyiv
- Website: https://kvartal95.com/en/

Kvartal 95 Studio (Ukrainian: Сту́дія «Кварта́л-95», lit. 'Studio «Neighborhood-95»'; Russian: Сту́дия «Кварта́л-95») is a Ukrainian production company founded in 2003 by Volodymyr Zelenskyy alongside Serhiy Shefir and Boris Shefir. The company produces films and television shows in Russian and Ukrainian, as well as organising concerts.

== History ==
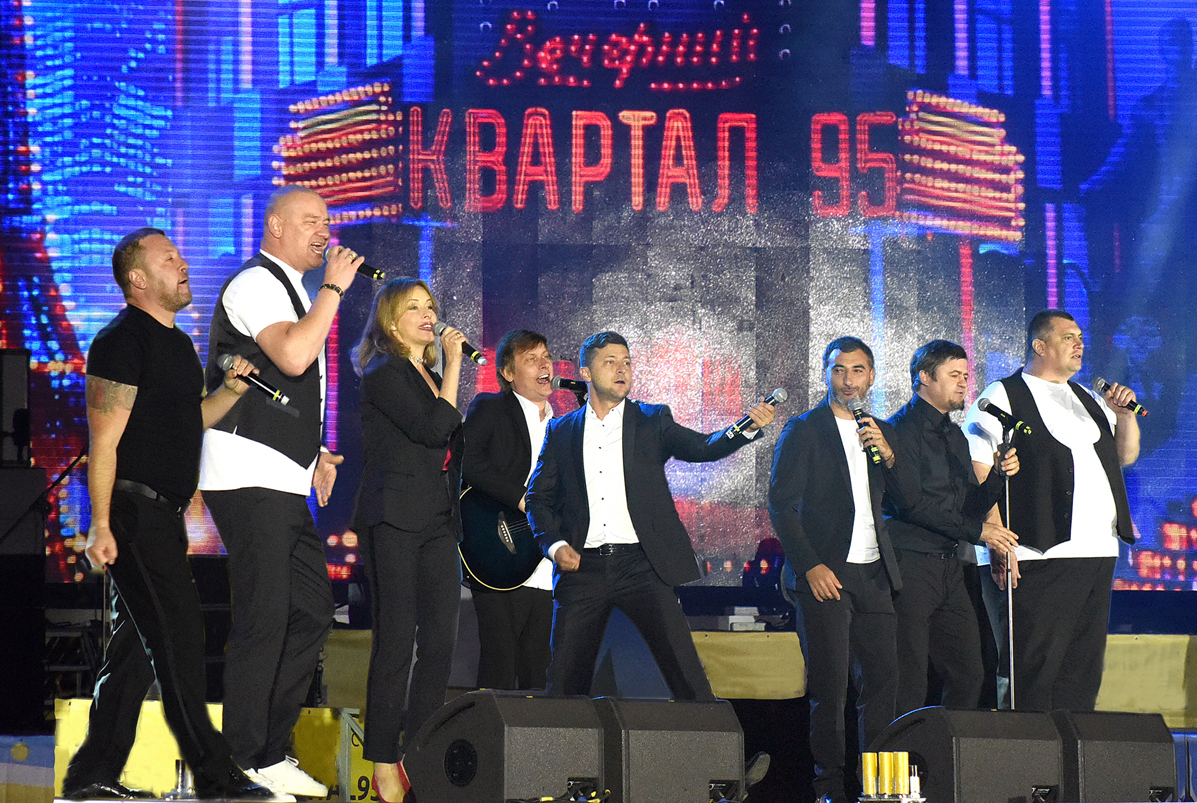
Vechirniy Kvartal (Evening Quarter), a comedy show produced by Kvartal 95

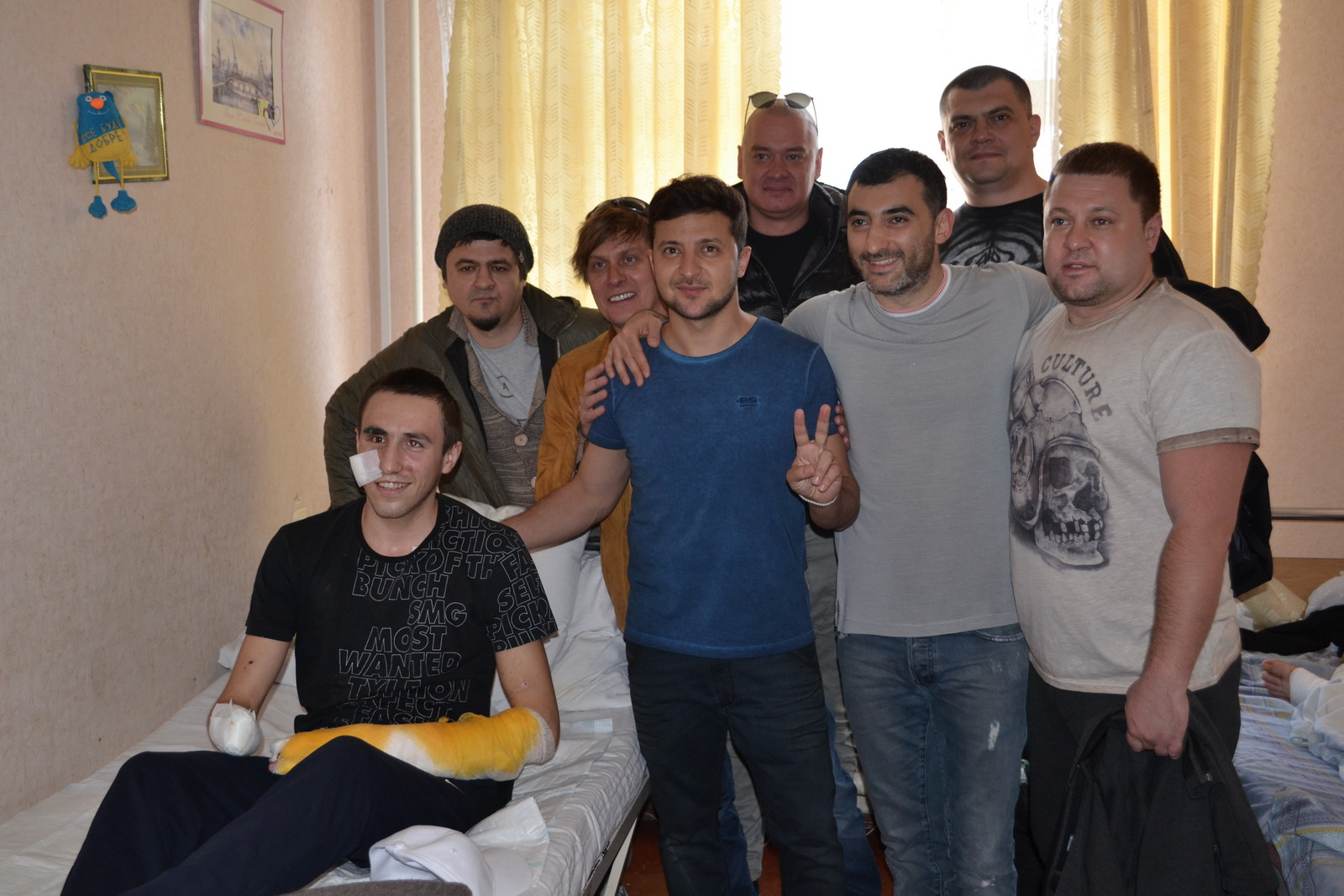
Kvartal 95 visiting wounded Ukrainian soldiers in Odesa in 2016

Kvartal 95 Studio was founded in 2003 on the basis of the KVN team Kvartal 95, which, in turn, is named after the 95th Kvartal, a neighborhood in Kryvyi Rih. Kvartal 95 KVN team was founded in 1997 while its official debut took place in 1998 at the KVN festival in Sochi. The studio as well as the KVN team was created by Volodymyr Zelenskyy, who ran in the 2019 Ukrainian presidential election, and was elected President of Ukraine.

According to Zelenskyy, the objective of the company is to "make the world a better place, a kinder and more joyful place with the help of those tools that we have, which are humor and creativity". It has produced such popular shows as Vechirniy Kvartal (English: Evening Neighbourhood), Svaty (The In-Laws), and Servant of the People. A television channel using its brand launched in 2016.

After Russia's 2014 annexation of Crimea, Kvartal 95 closed its office in Moscow and began shutting down business ties with Russia. By Zelenskyy's estimation, this reduced Kvartal 95's average revenue per hour of TV programming from $200,000 to $30,000. From 2014, Kvartal 95 also began visiting the war zone to perform for Ukrainian soldiers at the front in the Russo-Ukrainian War.

After Zelenskyy's inauguration, many leading figures of Kvartal 95 joined Zelenskyy's administration as Deputy Heads of the Presidential Administration of Ukraine, and one was appointed Deputy Head of the Ukrainian Secret Service.

== Members ==
The following is an incomplete list of current and former members of Kvartal 95.

=== Current members ===
- Yevhen Koshovyi
- Oleksandr Pikalov
- Stepan Kazanin
- Yuriy Velykyi
- Yuriy Tkach
- Yuriy Krapov
- Mika Fatalov
- Irina Soponaru
- Volodymyr Martynets

=== Co-owners ===
- Timur Mindich (former)—after Operation Midas uncovered the alleged involvement of Mindich in a major corruption scandal, Kvartal 95 registered a new legal entity without Mindich as an owner.
- Serhiy Shefir
- Iryna Pikalova
- Serhiy Kazanin
- Yevhen Koshovyi
- Yuriy Krapov
- Roman Marov
- Oleksandr Pikalov

=== Former members ===
- Volodymyr Zelenskyy
- Olena Kravets
- Denys Manshozov
